= Fred Wolf Films =

Animation studio

- Formerly: Murakami-Wolf Productions (1967–1978); Murakami-Wolf-Swenson (1978–1992)
- Industry: Animation
- Founded: 1967
- Founder: Jimmy T. Murakami; Fred Wolf
- Headquarters: Burbank, California, U.S. Dublin, Ireland
- Key people: Chairman & CEO: Fred Wolf
- Products: Television shows Feature films
- Website: http://www.fredwolffilms.com/

Fred Wolf Films is an American animation studio founded in 1967 by Fred Wolf and Jimmy T. Murakami. It was founded as MW (Murakami-Wolf) and later became known as Murakami-Wolf-Swenson (MWS) when Charles Swenson became a full partner in 1978. From 1989 to 2000, they also operated a subsidiary, Fred Wolf Films Dublin, located in Dublin, Ireland. It adopted its current name in 1992 following a reorganization.

The studio produced The Point, the first American animated special to air in prime time (on the ABC network in 1971). It was also responsible for Free to Be... You and Me, the Puff, the Magic Dragon specials, and television series such as Teenage Mutant Ninja Turtles, Toxic Crusaders, James Bond Jr., The New Adventures of Speed Racer, and Sarah Ferguson's Budgie the Little Helicopter.

== Film ==
- Catalina Caper (main titles only) (1967)
- The Box (Academy Award winner) (1967)
- The Magic Pear Tree (Academy Award nominee) (1968)
- 200 Motels (produced by; Charles Swenson - animation director) (1971)
- Down and Dirty Duck (produced by; Charles Swenson - director) (1974)
- The Mouse and His Child (1977)
- The Adventures of the American Rabbit (1986)
- Snow White and the Magic Mirror (1994)
- Young Pocahontas (1995)

== TV ==
TV films and specials

- The Point! (Murakami-Wolf Production; Fred Wolf - director) (1971), part of ABC Movie of the Week anthology series
- Free to Be... You and Me (select animated segments)
- Puff the Magic Dragon (1978)
  - Puff the Magic Dragon in the Land of the Living Lies (1979)
  - Puff and the Incredible Mr. Nobody (1982)
- The Little Rascals Christmas Special (1979)
- Strawberry Shortcake TV specials (1st and 3rd ones only)
- Thanksgiving in the Land of Oz (1980)
- Carlton Your Doorman (1980)
- Peter and the Magic Egg (1983)
- Mickey's 60th Birthday (1988)
- Rockin' Through the Decades (1990)
- Monster Bash (1992) (for USA Cartoon Express)

TV series

- Teenage Mutant Ninja Turtles (1987–1996)
- The Little Clowns of Happytown (1987–1988) (co-production with Marvel Productions)
- The Chipmunks (1988–1989) (eleven episodes from the sixth season)
- The California Raisin Show (1989)
- Barnyard Commandos (1990)
- Toxic Crusaders (1991) (co-production with Troma Entertainment)
- James Bond Jr. (1991–1992) (co-production with Danjaq and United Artists)
- The New Adventures of Speed Racer (1993–1994)

== Fred Wolf Films Dublin ==
TV

- Dino Babies (1994–1996)
- Budgie the Little Helicopter (1994–1996)
- The Fantastic Voyages of Sinbad the Sailor (1996–1998) (distributed by Warner Bros. International Television)
- The New Adventures of Zorro (1997–1998) (co-production with Harvest Entertainment, Zorro Productions, Inc. and Carrington Productions Incorporated, distributed by Warner Bros. International Television)
