= The Fantastic Voyages of Sinbad the Sailor =

Television series

- Written by: Doug Molitor
- Directed by: Gary Blatchford; Robert Hughes
- Voices of: Bob Bergen; Jim Cummings; Melissa Disney; Eric Jacklin; Robert Ridgely; Kath Soucie
- Countries of origin: United States; Ireland
- No. of episodes: 26

Production
- Executive producer: Fred Wolf
- Producers: Bill Wolf; Kara Vallow
- Production companies: Carrington Studios; WW Productions; Fred Wolf Films Dublin; Warner Bros. International Television

Original release
- Network: Syndication
- Release: 1996 – 1996

The Fantastic Voyages of Sinbad the Sailor is an American animated television series based on the Arabian Nights story of Sinbad the Sailor and produced by Fred Wolf Films. The series aired in syndication in 1996, with reruns aired beginning on February 2, 1998, on Cartoon Network.

== Plot ==
The series featured Sinbad as a teenager, with an exotic cat cub (Kulak) and a young boy (Hakeem) as constant companions.

== Cast ==
- Bob Bergen
- Jim Cummings
- Melissa Disney
- Eric Jacklin
- Robert Ridgely
- Kath Soucie
