= Dino Babies =

Children's animated television series

- Title poster
- Also known as: Dinobabies
- Genre: Cartoon
- Created by: Fred Wolf
- Written by: Ken Koonce; Michael Merton
- Directed by: Gary Blatchford; Bill Hutten (Season 1); John Kafka (Season 2); Tony Love; Russell Mooney (Season 2); Neal Warner (Season 1)
- Starring: Kathleen Barr; Matt Hill; Sam Khouth; Andrea Libman; Scott McNeil; Sarah Strange
- Theme music composer: Maxine Sellers; Dennis C. Brown
- Opening theme: "Dino Babies Having Fun"
- Ending theme: "Dino Babies Having Fun" (Instrumental)
- Composers: Peter Meisner; Maxine Sellers
- Countries of origin: Ireland; China (season 2)
- Original language: English
- No. of seasons: 2
- No. of episodes: 26 (52 segments)

Production
- Executive producer: Fred Wolf
- Producers: Fred Wolf; Kara Vallow
- Editor: Peter Grives
- Running time: 22–23 minutes
- Production companies: Fred Wolf Films Dublin; Shanghai Morning Sun Animation Company (season 2)

Original release
- Network: BBC One
- Release: 28 September 1994 – 2 May 1996

Dino Babies is a 1994–1996 children's animated television series about six baby dinosaurs who share stories and adventures.

== Production and airings ==
Originally produced between 1991 and 1994, Dino Babies first aired in the United Kingdom on the BBC's Children's BBC programming strand from 1994 to 1996. It comprised 26 20-minute double episodes. Dino Babies was broadcast in many countries around the world, but the show had little success in the United States. In 1996, however, the series was syndicated across the country by The Program Exchange; it also aired for a short time on what was then the Fox Family Channel in 1999.

The show had somewhat better success in Canada, where it aired on YTV from 1994 to 1999. It also aired in Ireland on RTÉ2 (as part of their children's block The Den), in Australia on both Max and Nickelodeon, in New Zealand on TVNZ 2, in the United Arab Emirates on Dubai 33 and the pan-regional STAR Plus, in Israel on Israeli Educational Television, in India on Zee TV (the series was dubbed into Hindi) and in Taiwan on STAR Chinese Channel.

== Overview ==
In every episode, the Dino Babies put their own imaginative spin on a classic tale, from "Dak and the Beanstalk" to "The Abominable Snowbaby". As fun as these flights of fancy were, they always had something important to say about the dinosaurs themselves and the world around them. By acting out classic tales, the dinosaurs learned valuable moral lessons.

== Characters ==
- Truman (voiced by Kathleen Barr) – The group's unofficial leader and storyteller, a bespectacled blue brainiac with a tuft of orange fur/feathers on his head.
- Franklin (voiced by Sarah Strange) – A timid, hesitant purple dinosaur. He occasionally shows signs of bravery.
- Marshall (voiced by Sam Vincent) – Franklin's little brother. A brown, diaper-wearing daredevil dinosaur. He sometimes gets upset due to being the smallest of the group, also known by the nickname "Marshy".
- LaBrea (voiced by Andrea Libman) – Marshall's best friend, and the only female Dino Baby. She is a headstrong purple dinosaur with blonde hair, wearing a hair accessory shaped like a bone. LaBrea often challenges Truman's authority, but is a good friend at heart, though occasionally grumpy and short-tempered.
- Stanley (voiced by Matt Hill) – A green dinosaur with red spots. He is a bragger who often runs into trouble. He also likes collecting rocks.
- Dak (voiced by Scott McNeil) – A blue, attention-starved pterosaur. While he often plays tricks on the group, they remain friends all the same.

== Episodes ==
=== Season 1 (1994) ===
In Season 1, each episode followed the same pattern: the first segment featured a story, while the second segment did not, with the exceptions being episodes four and five, where both segments featured a story, and episodes six, seven and nine, where the segments without a story came first, and the segments with a story came second.

Starting with the fourth episode, and continuing on for the remainder of the run of the series, most of the segments with a story and some of the segments without a story included one or two songs.

All transmission data is from the BBC Genome project.

This season was repeated on Fridays from 7 April through to 12 May 1995, except for Good Friday 14 April. It then began Monday and Friday repeats from Monday, 15 to Friday, 26 May 1995. It then switched to a reversal of the previous format from Friday 2 to Monday, 5 June 1995, before finishing its repeat run on two consecutive Fridays, 9 and 16 June 1995. All repeat transmissions were on BBC1 at 3:45 pm.

No.	Title	Original release date
1	"These Doors Are Made For Knockin' / The Raft"	28 September 1994 4:05 pm
These Doors Are Made For Knockin' – When the Dino Babies are trapped inside a cave by a saber-toothed wolf, Truman tells them a story of three Dino Babies who each thought the doors to their caves were the best.; Moral Lesson: Sometimes the least obvious choice is the best solution.: The Raft – Dak strands the Dino Babies on an island, so they make rafts to get back across the water. Only Stanley's raft works.; Moral Lesson: When strength doesn't succeed, skill often does.
2	"Dak and the Beanstalk / When Dinos Soar"	5 October 1994 3:55 pm
Dak and the Beanstalk – Truman has difficulty telling a story about a beanstalk, five adventurers captured by a giant and their escape. With support from the others, he finishes it.; Moral Lesson: What goes up must come down.: When Dinos Soar – The Dino Babies try to make Franklin fly to help him overcome his fear of heights. He finds out how to fly but Dak gets him to use it against his friends.; Moral Lesson: Don't give in to peer pressure.
3	"Goldisocks and the Three Dinobabies / Tree's A Crowd"	12 October 1994 3:55 pm
Goldisocks and the Three Dinobabies – LaBrea tells Marshall a story of Goldisocks who barges into the house of Three Dino Babies, while Truman, Stanley and Franklin are elsewhere.; Moral Lesson: Everyone is best at something, but no one is best at everything.: Tree's A Crowd – Dak finds the Dino Babies' tree cave which annoys the others especially when he pretends to have an injury.; Moral Lesson: Don't take advantage of other people.
4	"The Wizard of Ahhs / Some Like It Hot"	19 October 1994 3:55 pm
The Wizard of Ahhs – Truman tells a story of a Dino baby girl called Dorothy and her adventures in the land of Ahh.; Moral Lesson: There's no place like home. Song: The Awesome Wizard of Ahh.: Some Like It Hot – Truman tells a scary monster story, then the Dino Babies are met by a dragon baby named Puffy. They are against him at first but befriend him after finding him.; Moral Lesson: Don't judge others by their differences.
5	"A Big Little Problem / Snoring Beauty"	26 October 1994 4:10 pm
A Big Little Problem – Marshall stumbles into a land inhabited by little Punysaurs and, along with hearing a story of a little red hen, he becomes their ruler until the smallest of them makes the Punysaurs come to their senses.; Moral Lesson: Sometimes bigger isn't better.: Snoring Beauty – Marshall has trouble sleeping, so Truman tells him a story of a Princess put under a sleeping spell.; Moral Lesson: Resting is just as important as anything else. Songs: Franklin's Lullaby, I May Look Like a Frog.
6	"The Cloneheads / Robbing Hood"	2 November 1994 3:55 pm
The Cloneheads – A group of alien heads mimic the Dino Babies' features and want Truman for his stories, but nobody believes Truman when he tells them.; Moral Lesson: Sometimes things aren't what they appear to be. Song: When You Wish on a Falling Star.: Robbing Hood – In the middle of a bowling game, Truman tells a story about a hero named "Robbing Hood" who forms a band of Merry Men. Together they take back what the Sheriff of Rottingham taxed from the poor.; Moral Lesson: Heroes come in all forms. Song: I'm Known to all as Robbing Hood.
7	"Fuzzy Come Home / Crumby Trails To You"	9 November 1994 4:10 pm
Fuzzy Come Home – In the care of the Dino Babies, Fuzzy runs away. Stanley tries a substitute for Fuzzy, but Puffy helps find the real Fuzzy.; Moral Lesson: Sometimes the things we search for are often in the last place we think to look.: Crumby Trails To You – On a camping trip, Truman tells a story of Hansel and Gretel.; Moral Lesson: Knowing the right direction is important.
8	"A Tooth Fairy Tale / The Egg and Them"	16 November 1994 4:10 pm
A Tooth Fairy Tale – Marshall is upset by his wobbly tooth, so Truman tells him a story about Cindy and her missing tooth.; Moral Lesson: Change is not something to be scared of. Song: Dig, Dig, Dig.: The Egg and Them – Marshall finds an egg and Franklin hatches it into a baby T-Rex named Trixie. Trixie ensures her stay until she finds a mate.; Moral Lesson: Being a parent is a great responsibility. Song: Marshall's Lullaby.
9	"Look Before You Eek / Treasure Chest Island"	23 November 1994 4:10 pm
Look Before You Eek – The Dino Babies investigate an Earthshake and meet a trio of Gargoyles, Marshall being the only one to give them a chance to be friends.; Moral Lesson: Always give people a chance.: Treasure Chest Island – Truman tells the story of Jim Hawkins who finds a treasure map, but after finding the treasure, he refuses to share it with his friends, possibly influenced by the evil Long Dak Silver.; Moral Lesson: Sharing is important. Song: Steering Clear for the Treasure Chest that was lost in a Shipwreck.
10	"Franklinstein / Washed Up"	30 November 1994 4:10 pm
Franklinstein – While a Horny-face traps the Dino Babies in the tree cave, Truman tells the story of a glad scientist who creates a candy-loving monster.; Moral Lesson: Sometimes we may encounter something that seems scary, when really it turns out not to be. Song: Monster, Monster.: Washed Up – The other Dino Babies are shocked when Truman can't tell any more stories. In a surprising twist, the whole experience turns out to be Truman's dream.; Moral Lesson: Just because something happens in a dream, doesn't mean it happens in real life.
11	"The Soreheads and the Stone / LaBrea's Secret Garden"	7 December 1994 4:10 pm
The Soreheads and the Stone – Truman, with a little help from the other Dino Babies, tells a story of a group of knights who can't pick a leader.; Moral Lesson: Teamwork is the key to solving hard problems. Song: When We Pick our King.: LaBrea's Secret Garden – A meteor fragment crash lands and turns plants into monsters, which capture LaBrea, so the other Dino Babies mount a rescue attempt.; Moral Lesson: Always tell people where you are going.
12	"A Lad in a Lamp / Jurassic Ark"	14 December 1994 4:10 pm
A Lad in a Lamp – In Truman's latest story, a poor young boy finds a magic lamp and gets three wishes, but it isn't that simple.; Moral Lesson: Wishing the best for others is its own reward. Song: After All You've got Three Wishes.: Jurassic Ark – Franklin has the Dino Babies help him build an Ark when he mistakenly believes the island is in danger.; Moral Lesson: Don't jump to conclusions.
13	"Alice in Wonderfulland / The Abominable Snowbaby"	21 December 1994 4:10 pm
Alice in Wonderfulland – Truman helps LaBrea discover her imagination through the story of an unimaginative girl who finds herself in a strange land.; Moral Lesson: Everyone has their own strengths and weaknesses. Song: A Ditty is a Simple Song.: The Abominable Snowbaby – The Dino Babies stumble upon a baby Yeti, and Stanley finds himself in the clutches of its worried mother.; Moral Lesson: Helping others yields valuable rewards.

=== Season 2 (1996) ===
In Season 2, each episode followed the same pattern; both segments featured a story, with the exceptions of episodes sixteen and seventeen, where the first segments featured a story, and the second segments did not. During the original run of the season, the twenty-second episode was aired two weeks after the twenty-first instead of one week, due to coverage of the Grand National on 28 March 1996.

All transmission data is from the BBC Genome project.

No.	Title	Original release date
14	"Dakula / The Ugly Duckbill"	1 February 1996 3:45 pm
Dakula – While on a camp out, Truman tells the story of a pizza-eating vampire.; Moral Lesson: Sometimes, people aren't who we expect them to be. Song: That No Account, Account Dakula.: The Ugly Duckbill – Truman tells a story of how people are special no matter what they look like.; Moral Lesson: Just because something is different on the outside doesn't mean it is different on the inside. Song: I'm Different in the Way I Look.
15	"The Different Dragon / Cyranose"	8 February 1996 3:50 pm
The Different Dragon – After meeting their old friend Trixie, Truman tells the story of a dragon who was expected to be scary because of who he was.; Moral Lesson: You should like people for who they are, not who you'd like them to be. Song: I Live for Art and Life's Finer Things.: Cyranose – Truman tells a story about how a man was ashamed of his appearance, but had a good heart to make up for it.; Moral Lesson: It is what is on the inside that counts. Song: Rockane, Rockane.
16	"Peter Prank / Scarebusters"	15 February 1996 3:45 pm
Peter Prank – Truman tells a story of a boy who never wanted to go to school.; Moral Lesson: Education is as equally important as having fun.: Scarebusters – Franklin, trying to be brave, meets the Glowworms. Franklin's glowing makeover scares the Dino Babies, but he then introduces them to his new friends.; Moral Lesson: If you face your fears, you will have the courage to beat them. Song: It's Fun to be a Glowworm.
17	"A Nose for the Truth / Housepests"	22 February 1996 3:45 pm
A Nose for the Truth – Truman tells the story of Pinosio, the boy whose nose always grew when he told a lie.; Moral Lesson: Telling lies never solves anything.: Housepests – Various animals keep getting into the tree cave, causing the Dino Babies no end of problems.; Moral Lesson: Always make sure a plan is well thought through.
18	"Chrysanthemumbelina / Tantrum of the Opera"	29 February 1996 3:45 pm
Chrysanthemumbelina – LaBrea has a dream about a Dino girl who lives in a flower, and tells the other Dino Babies.; Moral Lesson: Sometimes big surprises come in small packages.: Tantrum of the Opera – Truman tells the story of a Phantom living underneath an opera house, who repeatedly tries to kidnap the star singer, Christine, because he hates opera. Coincidentally, he isn't the only one.; Moral Lesson: Everyone is entitled to their own opinion.
19	"Rapermzel / The Braggy Little Tailor"	7 March 1996 3:45 pm
Rapermzel – When LaBrea's mother gives her a bad haircut, she doesn't want the others to see. So Truman tells the story of a Princess whose hair grew to great lengths.; Moral Lesson: Don't be afraid of who you really are. Song: My Hair is so Golden and Long.: The Braggy Little Tailor – The other Dino Babies are tired of Stanley's bragging, so Truman tells the story of a tailor who thought he was the best at everything and got himself in big trouble.; Moral Lesson: Not only is bragging not very smart, but it can get you in trouble too. Song: I'm So Good at What I Do.
20	"The Selfish Ogre / Big Blanket Bedtime Story"	14 March 1996 3:45 pm
The Selfish Ogre – When LaBrea refuses to share her flowers with the others, Truman tells a story of an ogre who was extremely selfish.; Moral Lesson: By keeping joy from others, you keep it from yourself. Song: We Smell Something Sweet.: Big Blanket Bedtime Story – While watching a colony of ants, Truman tells a story about a shabby, humble Princess named Gorgia who tries to prove her worth to marry the prince.; Moral Lesson: Sometimes what seems like a bad decision is often the right one. Song: In That Ala Mode of Life.
21	"The Frog Bride / Mr. Dakyll And Dr. Hide"	21 March 1996 3:45 pm
The Frog Bride – Truman tells the story of a Dino girl who is turned into a frog by a wicked witch for stealing from her cherry orchard. The curse can only be broken if a Prince asks her to marry him.; Moral Lesson: Good things come when you least expect it. Song: I'll Find a Prince to Marry.: Mr. Dakyll And Dr. Hide – Truman tells a story about an ice-cream inventor who unwittingly invents a formula which unleashes his bad side.; Moral Lesson: There are always two sides to every person, just as there are always two sides to every story. Song: The Bad Humour Man.
22	"Goldfingers / The Starling and the Statue"	4 April 1996 3:50 pm
Goldfingers – Truman helps Stanley learn that you can have too much of a good thing through the story of King Midas.; Moral Lesson: Too much of a good thing isn't good. Song: I've Got the Golden Touch.: The Starling and the Statue – Truman tells the story of a starling who helps a talking statue, the Happy Prince, to make life better for his former subjects.; Moral Lesson: Only by sharing can you be truly happy. Song: How Can you keep Warm on a Cold and Gloomy Day.
23	"The Princess and the Pauper / The Dancing Princesses"	11 April 1996 3:50 pm
The Princess and the Pauper – Truman tells a story about a Princess who swapped places with a Pauper to experience a better life. Instead they are landed in the dungeon until the Princess clears everything up.; Moral Lesson: The grass isn't always greener on the other side of the fence. Song: If I were a Pauper, and If I were a Princess.: The Dancing Princesses – Truman tells the story of two Princesses who secretly sneak out each night, while he and the other Dino Babies look for Marshall's secret new friends.; Moral Lesson: Don't keep secrets from friends. Song: Where We Go, Nobody Knows.
24	"Oliver Twirp / The Snide Piper"	18 April 1996 3:50 pm
Oliver Twirp – Dak invites the other Dino Babies to a party, but they are not happy so he tells them a story of a boy who was harshly mistreated.; Moral Lesson: Appreciate others and they'll appreciate you. Song: We Sneak Around and Don't Get Caught.: The Snide Piper – When LaBrea breaks a promise to Franklin and Marshall, Truman tells her a story of how an entire town broke a promise to a piper.; Moral Lesson: There is a high price to pay for breaking a promise. Song: Would You Like to Get Rid of the Rats?.
25	"Beauty and the Beak / Ebegeezer Scrimp"	25 April 1996 3:50 pm
Beauty and the Beak – After LaBrea encounters a caterpillar, Truman tells a story of how people and things aren't always what they appear to be.; Moral Lesson: Don't judge a book by its cover. Song: I'd Like to Meet a Prince.: Ebegeezer Scrimp – Truman tries to teach Dak a lesson on selfishness with a story on Ebegeezer Scrimp and the Time Fairy.; Moral Lesson: Giving to others is better than giving to oneself. Song: There's A Lesson you Must Learn.
26	"The Emperor's New Robe / Mother Goose on the Loose"	2 May 1996 3:50 pm
The Emperor's New Robe – LaBrea makes friends with a snobbish Dino girl who thinks she is more special than everyone else, so Truman tells a story about an emperor who thought too much of himself as well.; Moral Lesson: Just be yourself if you want people to like you. Song: If You Make a New Robe for Me.: Mother Goose on the Loose – The other Dino Babies want to try telling stories, however, this causes Truman to think they don't like his stories anymore.; Moral Lesson: Sometimes it can be easy to misunderstand good intentions. Song: Old Mother Hubbard (Dino Babies version).
