= Mike, Lu & Og =

American animated television series

- Genre: Comedy; Adventure
- Created by: Mikhail Shindel; Mikhail Aldashin; Charles Swenson
- Voices of: Nika Futterman; Nancy Cartwright; Dee Bradley Baker; S. Scott Bullock; Corey Burton; Martin Rayner; Kath Soucie; Brian George
- Theme music composer: Igor Yuzov; Oleg Bernov
- Opening theme: "Mike, Lu & Og" by Red Elvises
- Composers: Igor Yuzov & Oleg Bernov (songs; season 1); Vladimir Horunzhy (songs; season 2); Vladimir Horunzhy (score)
- Country of origin: United States
- Original language: English
- No. of seasons: 2
- No. of episodes: 26 (52 segments)

Production
- Executive producer: Charles Swenson
- Producers: Artem Vasiliev; Igor Gelashvili; Vladimir Horunzhy
- Running time: 11 minutes
- Production company: Kinofilm

Original release
- Network: Cartoon Network
- Release: November 12, 1999 – May 27, 2001

Related
- What a Cartoon!

Mike, Lu & Og is an American animated television series created by Mikhail Shindel, Mikhail Aldashin, and Charles Swenson for Cartoon Network, and the 7th of the network's Cartoon Cartoons. The series follows a foreign exchange student from Manhattan named Mike, a self-appointed island princess named Lu, and a boy-genius named Og. The trio take part in various adventures as Mike and the island's natives share their customs with each other.

Before its cancellation, fifty-two eleven-minute episodes were produced by Mikhail Shindel's Kinofilm Animation in Los Angeles and animated by Mikhail Aldashin at Studio Pilot in Russia, featuring two stories per episode. The series features voice actors Nika Futterman as Mike, Nancy Cartwright as Lu, and Dee Bradley Baker as Og. Its distinctive visual style is similar to that of shows animated by Klasky Csupo, such as Rugrats, Aaahh!!! Real Monsters, Duckman, and early seasons of The Simpsons, due to its crudely drawn look; Swenson worked on Rugrats and Aaahh!!! Real Monsters prior to creating this series.

Reruns were broadcast on Boomerang from 2006 to 2011. On November 6, 2017, the series was added to Cartoon Network on Demand. as well as on Max in some regions.

== Characters ==
From left to right: Lu, Mike, and Og.

- Michelanne "Mike" Mazinsky (voiced by Nika Futterman) is an 11-year-old Manhattan-born girl who enjoys the features of the tropical island, but misses the life she had in New York and, as revealed in a particular instance, her school. Fortunately, Og is able to recreate many of the things that Mike misses most about the United States, at one instance creating a television.
- Lu Bellissimo Albonquetine (voiced by Nancy Cartwright) is a 10-year-old self-proclaimed princess of the island, Og's cousin and Alfred and Margery's niece. She is characterized by her loud and arrogant nature, and continually exploits Mike, Og, and her pet turtle, Lancelot. Og, being sagacious to a fault, frequently obliges to her will, even at the cost of her own well-being. Though she has a habit of tormenting everyone, she usually learns a lesson in humility by the end of each episode. Lu's unruly behavior is most likely a result of poor parenting on the part of her father, Wendell.
  - Lancelot is Lu's long-suffering pet turtle. She dresses him up in gaudy outfits, forces him to perform weird and dangerous stunts, and often makes him carry Lu on her back. For this reason, Lancelot is always running away from Lu, who keeps him on a leash. Despite this abuse, Lancelot tends to be the savior of Mike and the Islanders (especially Lu) when they are in trouble.
- Og Albonquetine (voiced by Dee Bradley Baker) is a 7-year-old raspy-voiced member of the Albonquetines, Lu's cousin and Wendell's nephew. He has a predisposition to scientific theory and discovery. His inventions-gone-awry help develop the plots of many episodes.
  - Mrs. Pig (voiced by Kath Soucie), Mr. Goat (voiced by Dee Bradley Baker), and Spiney Porcupine (voiced by Martin Rayner) are Og's pets, who are capable of speech and are well-learned in philosophy. Together, they form the Philosophical Society, discussing such "great thinkers" as Nietzsche, matters of existentialism, and the relevance of time.
- Wendell Albonquetine (voiced by S. Scott Bullock) is Lu's father and Alfred's brother, and the longtime Governor of the Island. Wendell is Og's uncle and Margery's brother-in-law. He is wiry, weak-willed, and is seemingly unable to control his daughter or deliver any sort of discipline to her.
- Alfred Albonquetine (voiced by Martin Rayner) is Og's father and Wendell's brother, and Margery's husband. Alfred is Lu's uncle. He is eccentric and charismatic, and also has a noticeable speech impediment preventing him from pronouncing his Rs. He fancies himself to be the island's hunter, using suction-cup arrows to persistently hunt a wombat named Woolly Wombat.
- Margery Albonquetine (voiced by Kath Soucie) is Og's mother and Alfred's wife, who fancies herself to be an artist and writer. Margery is Wendell's sister-in-law and Lu's aunt. Her arts including painting, sculpting, and cooking. In addition, Margery is the island's chef, preparing meals and tea for everyone on her side of the island, as well as preparing buffets and elaborate meals for special occasions. In writing, she is something of a historian. Throughout the series she is working on a book about the island's history titled "Cuzzlewits End".
- Old Queeks Albonquetine (voiced by Corey Burton) is the island elder and witch doctor whom the Islanders seek advice from. He is also seen to be able to perform a kind of magic, summoning dead spirits. He is often opposed to Mike's innovative ways, but sometimes gets caught up in modern crazes that hit the island. Queeks claims to be psychic and he claims to "know all and see all". Mike eventually learns that Queeks is not psychic and spies on the Islanders through a telescope. Even after Mike informs the Islanders about Old Queeks' telescope, they continue to believe that he is psychic.
- Pirates are three pirates living nearby are descended from the pirates who caused the islanders' ancestors to be shipwrecked in the first place, but were then shipwrecked themselves. Their leader is named Captain (voiced by Brian George), who has two wooden legs and two eye patches. Despite these handicaps, he seems to get around without any problems. The other two pirates are called First Mate (voiced by Martin Rayner) and Bos'n (voiced by Corey Burton). The pirates sometimes attempt to catch and eat Lancelot, but are always foiled by the three children.
- The Cuzzlewits are a clan who live on the other side of the island. Although they are shown to live in caves, one of their number, Hermione (voiced by Alison Larkin), a Cuzzlewit girl, is seen to be an extremely experienced thinker. She is accompanied by two Cuzzlewit boys, twin brothers Haggis and Baggis (voiced by Brian George and S. Scott Bullock), who constantly batter each other with clubs and appear to be dimwitted and rowdy. The elders of the Cuzzlewits and the Albonquetanians do not get along, hence their separation. Despite the adults' squabbles, Mike and Hermione become friends in "The Three Amigas".

== Production ==
Mike, Lu & Og premiered on Cartoon Network's animation shorts showcase World Premiere Toons as a seven-minute short on November 6, 1998. In January 1999, Cartoon Network announced that three new original series would premiere on the network: Courage the Cowardly Dog, Ed, Edd n Eddy, and Mike, Lu & Og. Mike, Lu & Og was set to premiere in November of that year with 13 episodes. According to Animation World Magazine, the series premiere date was set for November 12, 1999, and would be produced simultaneously at Pilot Studio in Moscow and Kinofilm in Los Angeles. Previews for Mike, Lu & Og were shown in American movie theaters before Pokémon: The First Movie. The series ran on Cartoon Network from November 12, 1999, to May 27, 2001, airing 26 half-hour episodes in total. A video game deal between Cartoon Network and Majesco featuring characters from the series was announced for the Nintendo Game Boy Advance handheld console in May 2002 but ultimately never released.

== Series overview ==
Season	Episodes	Originally released	
Season	Episodes	First released	Last released
Pilot		November 7, 1998	
1	13	November 12, 1999	April 21, 2000
2	13	January 7, 2001	May 27, 2001

== Episodes ==
This is a list of episodes from the animated series Mike, Lu & Og. The show ran for two seasons consisting of 13 episodes, each with two 11-minute segments.

=== Pilot (1998) ===
No.	Title	Directed by	Written by	Storyboarded by	Original release date
0	"Crash Lancelot"	Mikhail Aldashin	Charles Swenson	Mikhail Aldashin	November 7, 1998
Mike gets Og to build her a car to drive across the island. Lu gets a fancier model powered by a nuclear device that quickly goes out of control. Note: The pilot was originally aired as part of The What a Cartoon Show.

=== Season 1 (1999–2000) ===
No. overall	No. in season	Title	Directed by	Written by	Storyboarded by	Original air date	Prod. code
1a	1a	"Sultans of Swat"	Valery Konoplev and Slava Ushakov	Charles Swenson	Slava Ushakov, Valery Konoplev, and Oleg Kuzovkov	November 12, 1999	102a
Mike introduces baseball to the island.
1b	1b	"Tea for Three"	Elena Rogova	Charles Swenson	Elena Rogova	November 12, 1999	102b
The last teacup from the Good Ship Betty Anne goes missing. Mike tries to find out who stole it.
2a	2a	"The Tube"	Alexander Tatarsky	Charles Swenson	Eduard Kiritch, Natalia Chernishova, and Artur Kraus	November 19, 1999	101a
Og builds a television.
2b	2b	"Roller Madness"	Mikhail Tumelia	Charles Swenson	Vasiko Bedoshvili and Mikhail Tumelia	November 19, 1999	101b
Mike introduces everyone to roller skates.
3a	3a	"Losing Lancelot"	Valery Konoplev and Slava Ushakov	Charles Swenson	Slava Ushakov and Valery Konoplev	November 26, 1999	103a
Lancelot risks life and limb to get away from Lu.
3b	3b	"Buzz Cut"	Alexander Guriev	Charles Swenson	Sergey Merinov, Alexander Guriev, and Natalia Chernishova	November 26, 1999	103b
Og builds a helicopter.
4a	4a	"Elephant Walk"	Alexander Tatarsky	Charles Swenson	Eduard Kiritch, Vasiko Bedoshvili, and Andrey Sokolov	December 3, 1999	104a
Lu wants to ride an elephant while Mike and Og create an elephant wash.
4b	4b	"Palm Pet"	Mikhail Tumelia	Charles Swenson and Vera Duffy	Vasiko Bedoshvili, Artur Kraus, Andrey Sokolov, and Mikhail Tumelia	December 3, 1999	104b
Feeling lonely, Mike befriends a young palm tree.
5a	5a	"Yo, Ho, Who?"	Elena Rogova	Charles Swenson	Elena Rogova	December 10, 1999	105a
The trio visit a pirate-infested island called The Barnacle.
5b	5b	"A Boy's Game"	Alexander Guriev	Charles Swenson and Vera Duffy	Sergey Merinov, Alexander Guriev, and Natalia Chernishova	December 10, 1999	105b
Og creates a gaming platform that bears a striking resemblance to a Game Boy.
6a	6a	"Whole Lotta Shakin'"	Mikhail Tumelia	Charles Swenson, Michael Karnow, and Lance Khazei	Vasiko Bedoshvili, Artur Kraus, and Mikhail Tumelia	December 17, 1999	106a
The Albonquetanians are thrilled about the volcanic activity while Mike and Lancelot express their fear.
6b	6b	"The Mother of All; Marathons"	Alexander Tatarsky	Charles Swenson and Michael Karnow	Andrey Sokolov	December 17, 1999	106b
The Albonquetanians organize a marathon.
7a	7a	"Hot Couture"	Alexander Guriev	Charles Swenson	Sergey Merinov, Alexander Guriev, and Natalia Chernishova	January 7, 2000	107a
In search of a new wardrobe, Mike hosts a fashion show.
7b	7b	"Opposites Attack"	Mikhail Tumelia	Charles Swenson	Vasiko Bedoshvili and Mikhail Tumelia	January 7, 2000	107b
Og misses a Philosophical Society meeting while performing chores for his family and creates an army of rampaging robots that terrorizes the island after he stresses out with the work burden.
8a	8a	"Scopin' It Out"	Alexander Tatarsky	Charles Swenson and Vera Duffy	Eduard Kiritch and Andrey Sokolov	January 14, 2000	108a
Old Queeks convinces everyone that he's psychic after finding a missing Lancelot, but Mike is skeptical about his claims.
8b	8b	"The Good Ship Bad"	Mikhail Aldashin and Alexander Guriev	Charles Swenson	Sergey Merinov, Alexander Guriev, and Natalia Chernishova	January 14, 2000	108b
The trio explore an old pirate ship.
9a	9a	"High Rise"	Alexander Guriev	Charles Swenson	Sergey Merinov, Alexander Guriev, and Natalia Chernishova	January 21, 2000	109a
Mike introduces everyone to the idea of an apartment building.
9b	9b	"The Great Snipe Hunt"	Alexander Tatarsky	Charles Swenson, Susan Meyers, and Lance Khazei	Eduard Kiritch and Andrey Sokolov	January 21, 2000	109b
It's Og's seventh birthday, but very little goes his way including a hunting trip with Alfred that goes horribly wrong with his animal friends thinking Og has turned into a cold-blooded killer.
10a	10a	"Nobody's Nose"	Valery Konoplev	Charles Swenson and Susan Meyers	Valery Konoplev	November 24, 2000	112a
Mike is chosen to be The Nose for a springtime ritual.
10b	10b	"Scuba Doobie Doo"	Oleg Kuzovkov	Charles Swenson and Vera Duffy	Oleg Kuzovkov	November 24, 2000	112b
Everyone prepares for a visit from the flying mailman while Lu prepares for war against the "invader".
11a	11a	"Jujubombs"	Elena Rogova	Charles Swenson, Susan Meyers, and Lance Khazei	Elena Rogova	January 28, 2000	110a
Og makes jujubombs for Mike and Lu becomes addicted.
11b	11b	"Turtle Stew"	Mikhail Tumelia	Charles Swenson	Vasiko Bedoshvili and Mikhail Tumelia	January 28, 2000	110b
The pirates try to turn Lancelot into dinner.
12a	12a	"A Bicycle Built for Me"	Alexander Guriev	Charles Swenson and Susan Meyers	Sergey Merinov	April 14, 2000	111a
Og builds a 27 speed bicycle for Mike and Lu wants it all for herself.
12b	12b	"Crowded House"	Elena Rogova	Charles Swenson and Michael Karnow	Elena Rogova	April 14, 2000	111b
Mike gets Og to build a searchlight to attract a cruise ship filled with tourists, who prove to be nothing but trouble.
13a	13a	"High Camp"	Elena Rogova	Charles Swenson	Elena Rogova	April 21, 2000	113a
Og sets off to find a blue swallowtail butterfly and inadvertently invites Mike and Lu, while Lu tries to scare the daylights out of Mike and Og with the legend of the Wooly Mountain Elephant.
13b	13b	"Sneeze, Please"	Slava Ushakov	Charles Swenson, Vera Duffy, and Lance Khazei	Slava Ushakov	April 21, 2000	113b
Mike catches a cold after getting doused by ice water and Lu spreads it hoping it will get Mike off the island for good.

=== Season 2 (2001) ===
No. overall	No. in season	Title	Directed by	Written by	Storyboarded by	Original release date	Prod. code
14a	1a	"A Learning Experience"	Elena Rogova	Charles Swenson	Elena Rogova	January 7, 2001	201a
Mike attends her first day of school on the island and meets the Cuzzlewits.
14b	1b	"We the People"	Alexander Guriev	Susan Sherman; Susan Sherman and Mikhail Shindel (story)	Sergey Merinov and Alexander Guriev	January 7, 2001	201b
Mike and Wendell compete for the position of governor.
15a	2a	"Money"	Alexander Tatarsky	Michael Ryan; Michael Ryan and Vera Duffy (story)	Eduard Kiritch and Andrey Sokolov	January 14, 2001	202a
The Albonquetanians trade in clams and pigs for modern currency.
15b	2b	"Repeat After Me"	Mikhail Tumelia	Susan Sherman	Vasiko Bedoshvili and Mikhail Tumelia	January 14, 2001	202b
Wendell's bird, Skipper, gets Mike into a lot of trouble.
16a	3a	"Thanks, but No Thanks"	Valery Konoplev	Charles Swenson and Susan Sherman; Charles Swenson and Mikhail Shinden (story)	Valery Konoplev	January 21, 2001	203a
The pirates are starving, so Mike invites them over for an "All Foodstuff's Eve" dinner but under the condition that the Pirates dress as Mike's friends visiting from Manhattan.
16b	3b	"Hot Dog"	Oleg Kuzovkov	Vera Duffy	Oleg Kuzovkov	January 21, 2001	203b
Mike is sick of eating coconut-based meals, so Og creates a hot dog machine. Since everyone is more or less vegetarian, and the ingredients of the hotdog are vague, Og improvises causing a near riot with everybody who goes into a hot dog eating craze.
17a	4a	"That Sinking Feeling"	Elena Rogova	Michael Ryan; Michael Ryan and Vera Duffy (story)	Elena Rogova	February 4, 2001	204a
Wendell warns everyone that the island is sinking.
17b	4b	"Founder's Day"	Alexander Guriev	Susan Sherman	Sergey Merinov and Alexander Guriev	February 4, 2001	204b
The Albonquetanians celebrate the founding of their island with a musical play.
18a	5a	"Giant Steps"	Slava Ushakov	Michael Ryan	Slava Ushakov	February 18, 2001	205a
Mike and Lancelot must collect a piece of shell from the waga-waga bird, a piece of web from the geyser spider, and the eyetooth of the black shark to prevent a "Giant" from invading the island.
18b	5b	"Night of the Living Ancestors"	Alexander Tatarsky	Charles Swenson	Eduard Kiritch and Vasiko Bedoshvili	February 18, 2001	205b
Queeks, who was in a very angry mood, attempts to curse Mike, by bringing the island's ancestors back from the dead. Instead they take a liking to Mike and cause misery to the others on the island.
19a	6a	"For the Love of Mike"	Mikhail Tumelia	Vera Duffy, and Susan Sherman (story)	Andrey Sokolov and Mikhail Tumelia	March 4, 2001	206a
Haggis and Baggis declare their undying love for Mike.
19b	6b	"Sparks"	Alexander Guriev	Michael Ryan, and Mikhail Shindel (story)	Sergey Merinov and Alexander Guriev	March 4, 2001	206b
Mike is having trouble sleeping through all the darkness, so Og invents the lightbulb.
20a	7a	"Brave Sir Lancelot"	Elena Rogova	Susan Sherman	Elena Rogova	April 29, 2001	207a
Lancelot becomes covered in gold paint and worshipped by a tribe of land turtles.
20b	7b	"The Big Game"	Alexander Tatarsky	Charles Swenson; Charles Swenson and Michael Ryan (story)	Eduard Kiritch and Vasiko Bedoshvili	April 29, 2001	207b
Mike attempts to train an elephant named Abelard who has no confidence in himself in order to beat Lu and her elephant in a game of croquet/polo for the Lady Smythe Trophy.
21a	8a	"Flustering Footwear Flotsam"	Mikhail Tumelia	Vera Duffy, and Michael Ryan (story)	Andrey Sokolov and Mikhail Tumelia	May 6, 2001	208a
A intermodal container with a cargo-load of shoes washes up on the island and everyone goes crazy over them, while they just drive Queeks and Mike crazy.
21b	8b	"Fathers and Pies"	Alexander Guriev	Susan Sherman	Sergey Merinov and Alexander Guriev	May 6, 2001	208b
After a freak accident in Og's workshop, Margery and Alfred believe that Og's been turned into a pie, but Og doesn't turned because he's still alive.
22a	9a	"Queeks, Queeks, Who's; Got the Queeks?"	Alexander Tatarsky	Michael Ryan	Eduard Kiritch and Vasiko Bedoshvili	May 13, 2001	209a
The Cuzzlewits kidnap Queeks and Mike sets off to rescue him.
22b	9b	"Alfred, Lord of the Jungle"	Elena Rogova and Alexander Guriev	Vera Duffy	Elena Rogova	May 13, 2001	209b
A stereotypical North American documenter shows up on the island to film a documentary and winds up filming an action film starring Alfred.
23a	10a	"The King of Curtains"	Mikhail Tumelia	Susan Sherman	Andrey Sokolov and Mikhail Tumelia	May 20, 2001	210a
Lancelot and the Islanders find an old message in a bottle thinking it was from the king of England. A salesman named Bob Johnson, King of Curtains, arrives on the island to sell curtains instead.
23b	10b	"Margery the Duck"	Alexander Guriev	Susan Sherman	Sergey Merinov and Alexander Guriev	May 20, 2001	210b
Og's experiment accidentally hypnotizes Margery into thinking she's a duck.
24a	11a	"A Freudian Split"	Valery Konoplev	Charles Swenson; Mikhail Shindel and Susan Sherman (story)	Valery Konoplev	May 20, 2001	211a
Pig and Goat argue about peanut butter and jelly and Og gets caught in the middle. Mike suggests that they should have a debate, and it winds up as a free-for-all brawl.
24b	11b	"Fitness Fever"	Slava Ushakov	Michael Ryan, and Mikhail Shindel (story)	Slava Ushakov	May 20, 2001	211b
Wendell despairs over his weight gain and Mike offers to help him lose it. Wendell coins the term "Albonquetanian" in this episode.
25a	12a	"The Hunter and the Hunted"	Elena Rogova	Susan Sherman	Elena Rogova	May 27, 2001	212a
Alfred nails the wombat on the wombat's birthday and upsets him by doing a victory taunt. The wombat retaliates, discouraging Alfred from hunting. Mike acts like an envoy to have the two make up.
25b	12b	"To Serve Lu"	Alexander Tatarsky	Michael Ryan	Vasiko Bedoshvili and Eduard Kiritch	May 27, 2001	212b
Mike becomes Lu's slave when Lu tricks her into giving up her Action Guy comic book after losing a bet. Lancelot is off the hook, but feels guilty for it and tells Mike through pantomime of how Lu rigged the game in her favor.
26a	13a	"The Three Amigas"	Alexander Guriev	Vera Duffy; Vera Duffy and Susan Sherman (story)	Sergey Merinov and Alexander Guriev	May 27, 2001	213a
Lu is jealous of Mike and Hermione's newfound friendship and tries to ruin it.
26b	13b	"Sleeping Ugly"	Mikhail Tumelia	Charles Swenson	Andrey Sokolov and Mikhail Tumelia	May 27, 2001	213b
Miss Hortense the Sleeping Ugly Hag princess is accidentally awakened by Queeks' kiss causing total misery for Queeks.
