= The Adventures of the American Rabbit =

1986 film directed by Fred Wolf and Nobutaka Nishizawa

- Theatrical release poster
- Directed by: Fred Wolf; Nobutaka Nishizawa
- Written by: Norman Lenzer
- Based on: Characters by Stewart Moskowitz
- Produced by: Masaharu Etoh; Masahisa Saeki; John G. Marshall
- Starring: Bob Arbogast; Pat Fraley; Barry Gordon; Bob Holt; Lew Horn; Norman Lenzer; Ken Mars; John Mayer; Maitzi Morgan; Lorenzo Music; Laurie O'Brien; Hal Smith; Russi Taylor; Fred Wolf
- Cinematography: Isamu Tsuchida
- Music by: Mark Volman; Howard Kaylan; John Hoier
- Production companies: Toei Animation; Murakami-Wolf-Swenson Films Inc. Wolfkill Productions
- Distributed by: Clubhouse Pictures
- Release date: January 17, 1986 (United States)
- Running time: 82 minutes
- Countries: United States; Japan
- Language: English
- Box office: $1,268,443

The Adventures of the American Rabbit (released in the UK as simply The American Rabbit) is a 1986 animated film directed by Fred Wolf and Nobutaka Nishizawa. It was released by Clubhouse Pictures.

== Plot ==
The story begins just after the birth of Robert Rabbit (Barry Gordon). As his parents and friends welcome him into the world, a mysterious old rabbit who walks with a cane greets young Rob and disappears. The old rabbit shows up a few more times throughout Rob's childhood, always disappearing after making comments or inquiries about his talents and attitude. One day, when Rob's parents become endangered by a falling boulder, he sprints toward them and changes into a striped and star-spangled superhero on golden rollerskates. The old rabbit reappears and tells Rob that he is the American Rabbit, capable of changing into superhero form when he sprints and changing back to normal when he says his own name.

After his hometown turns out to be in a pocket dimension to which he can never return, Rob decides to try to keep his superpowers a secret and moves to the city. He finds a job as a piano player at the Panda Monium, a nightclub run by a panda named Teddy and a female rabbit named Bunny O'Hare. The club is harassed by a gang of jackals who run a Mafia-style protection racket. When Teddy refuses to buy insurance from them, they return on their motorcycles during a White Brothers show and wreck the club. Bunny and Teddy organize a march and rally the next day, and Walt (Kenneth Mars), the Jackals' well-dressed boss, orders them to ride their motorcycles in the march. They cause a distraction while Walt's buzzard destroys the cables that support the Golden Gate Bridge as the marchers are crossing it, but the American Rabbit stops the bridge from collapsing. Teddy then announces his plans to do a cross-country tour with the White Brothers, which will allow him to raise enough money to rebuild the Panda Monium.

An irritated Walt orders the Jackals to kidnap a gorilla (Lorenzo Music) named Ping Pong and turn him against the American Rabbit. They take him to a secret lair in the Grand Canyon and threaten to drown him unless he fights the American Rabbit for them, but Rob discovers that Ping Pong is missing. He sends Teddy, Bunny, and the White Brothers rafting down the river (not knowing it leads to a waterfall) and is captured by the Jackals, but manages to turn into the American Rabbit and rescue Ping Pong.

Rob and his friends then travel to New Orleans, where they plan to play at a couple of clubs. Walt and the Jackals trap them on a boat and set it on fire, but Rob becomes the American Rabbit and gets everybody off the boat before it explodes. Bunny is worried when she does not see Rob, but the American Rabbit promises to search for him and learn more about the fire. He follows Walt and the Jackals and overhears them talking about heading to New York, where their master plan is afoot. The American Rabbit dives back into the water, where he transforms back into Rob and swims to shore. He suggests that the tour group go to New York, where Teddy has some connections who can provide them with new instruments.

Meanwhile, Walt and the Jackals capture a chocolate-making moose and his son and rent the Statue of Liberty for a day. They rig it with dynamite, and Walt threatens to blow up the visiting public if they refuse to serve him. The American Rabbit discovers the dynamite, follows Walt's voice to his hiding place, and clobbers him. Walt's clothes are the only thing that remain; it is revealed that "Walt" is actually the buzzard, Vultor. Perching on the detonator for the dynamite, he forces the American Rabbit to fly around the Statue of Liberty and deliver an announcement to the public: Vultor and the Jackals are in total control of the city, those who oppose them will be killed, and those who obey them will be rewarded with chocolate. Greatly ashamed by his failure to defeat Vultor and protect the city, Rob fades from the public eye.

With the American Rabbit out of the picture, Vultor and the Jackals begin to enact their laws on New York. However, the people turn on the Jackals when they fail to keep their promises and maintain order, and Teddy, Bunny, Ping Pong, and the White Brothers free the moose and his son. Vultor curses the Jackals, dismissing them as traitors when they tell him how frustrated the people are, and swears to destroy the American Rabbit (and the city) with his doomsday switch.

Rob, still humiliated by his earlier defeat, catches a taxi and tells the driver that he is a failure. The taxi driver turns out to be the elderly rabbit from the beginning of the film, who offers Rob some advice: "You can't win 'em all, but you can make a power play of your own." Rob notices a poster for Niagara Falls, which spurs him back into action. He uses his powers to generate a force field, which stops the flow of the water that runs New York's hydroelectric turbines, cutting the power to the city and deactivating the doomsday switch. A furious Vultor faces the American Rabbit for a final showdown, but the Rabbit chases him into a blizzard and refuses his offer to join forces. Vultor makes one last attempt to kill the American Rabbit by diving at him, but misses and plunges to his death.

The American Rabbit returns as Rob to see his friends, and gets a kiss from Bunny O'Hare.

== Voice cast ==
- Barry Gordon as American Rabbit/Rob/Punk Jackal
- Laurie O'Brien as Bunny O'Hare
- Bob Arbogast as Teddy/Penguin 2
- Ken Mars as Walt/Vultor the Buzzard
- Pat Fraley as Tini Meeny/Rob's Father
- Russi Taylor as Rob's Mother/Lamb
- Bob Holt as Rotten Rodney, Jackal Biker Leader/Penguin 3 (final film role)
- Norm Lenzer as Brutal Bruno, Assistant Head Jackal
- Lorenzo Music as Ping Pong
- Hal Smith as Mentor/Mad Marvin, Sergeant-At-Arms Jackal/Too Loose
- John Mayer as Horrible Hugo, Road Captain Jackal/Penguin 1
- Lew Horn as Dip/Additional Voices
- Maitzi Morgan as Lady Pig/Old Woman Rabbit
- Fred Wolf as Fred Red

== Production ==
An American/Japanese co-production between Murakami-Wolf-Swenson (now Fred Wolf Films) and Toei Animation, The Adventures of the American Rabbit was based upon the poster character of the same name created by pop artist Stewart Moskowitz. The artist's characters were adopted as the mascots for many major Japanese companies, hence the film's backing by Japanese investors and the participation of the aforementioned Toei Animation. Legendary animator Shingo Araki was among the animation staff working on the film. The screenplay was written by Norman Lenzer, from the ABC television movie The Point!. It was co-directed by Fred Wolf and long-time Toei Animation director Nobutaka Nishizawa.

== Release and reception ==
The film was among the first to be released by Clubhouse Pictures, a division of independent distributor Atlantic Releasing, which specialized in children's entertainment. It was not well-received by critics or audiences through its original run. The film was released January 17, 1986 and grossed $291,126 during its opening weekend from 242 screens and ran for two months, grossing $1,268,443.

Charles Solomon of the Los Angeles Times said, "Both the writing and the animation in The Adventures of the American Rabbit are so inept that the viewer expects the governor to interrupt the film and declare the theater a disaster area!"

MGM Home Entertainment released American Rabbit on DVD in February 2005. It was presented in fullscreen (as opposed to its original widescreen release) and contained no extras.

== Sources ==
- Beck, Jerry (2005). The Animated Movie Guide. ISBN 1-55652-591-5. Chicago Reader Press. Retrieved April 7, 2007.
