= Going Bananas (film) =

- Directed by: Boaz Davidson
- Written by: Menahem Golan
- Produced by: Yoram Globus; Menahem Golan
- Starring: Dom DeLuise; Jimmie Walker; David Mendenhall; Deep Roy; Warren Berlinger; Herbert Lom
- Cinematography: Joseph Wein
- Edited by: Bruria Davidson; Natan Zahavi
- Music by: Pino Donaggio
- Production company: The Cannon Group
- Distributed by: Cannon Film Distributors
- Release dates: August 5, 1987 (France); February 12, 1988 (United States)
- Running time: 95 minutes
- Country: United States
- Language: English

Going Bananas is a 1987 American comedy film directed by Boaz Davidson and written by Menahem Golan. The film stars Dom DeLuise, Jimmie Walker, David Mendenhall, Deep Roy, Warren Berlinger and Herbert Lom. The film was released on February 12, 1988, by Cannon Film Distributors.

== Plot ==
A boy (David Mendenhall), his guardian (Dom DeLuise) and an African guide (Jimmie Walker) try to save a talking chimp called Bonzo from bad guys.

== Cast ==
- Dom DeLuise as Big Bad Joe Hopkins
- Jimmie Walker as Mozambo
- David Mendenhall as Ben McNamara
- Deep Roy as Bonzo
- Warren Berlinger as Palermo
- Herbert Lom as Captain Mackintosh
- Fats Dibeco as Sergeant Abdul
- Graham Armitage as Cake Waiter
- Mike Westcott as Robert Anderson

== Production ==
The role of Big Bad Joe Hopkins was advertised to be played by Bud Spencer before changed to Dom DeLuise. Directors considered were Menahem Golan and Sam Firstenberg.
