= Sarah Strange =

Canadian actress

Sarah Strange (born September 6, 1974) is a Canadian actress. She has worked in a variety of American and Canadian television and film projects, including Helen in the Canadian drama Da Vinci's Inquest and as the voice actress for the male half of Ranma Saotome in the first 64 episodes of Ranma 1/2 (as well as the movies and the OVAs) before she was replaced by Richard Ian Cox for the rest of the series.

== Life and career ==
Strange was born in Vancouver, British Columbia, the daughter of screenwriters Susan and Marc Strange (creators of The Beachcombers). She grew up in Canada's entertainment industry, and has appeared in comedic, dramatic, and science fiction projects on both big and small screens since graduating from high school.

In 1988, David Fincher directed her in the USA version of the music video for Shattered Dreams by Johnny Hates Jazz. She played the uncredited lead female in the black and white video.

Strange has since garnered multiple Gemini Award nominations for her acting, winning an award for her guest role in the Canadian series Neon Rider at 21. Strange is also known for playing the voice of boy-type Ranma Saotome for the OVAs, movies and first three seasons of the anime series Ranma ½ released from 1993 to 1998, however, she left after season 3 in order to focus on live action work. She played Jill Langston, the lead virologist in seasons 1 and 2 of the Canadian Science drama ReGenesis.

She also provided the voice of Franklin in Dinobabies and Rookie in Littlest Pet Shop.

Strange was among the cast of the ABC romantic comedy drama Men In Trees (2006—2008), on which she portrayed the town barmaid and a reconciling wife opposite Abraham Benrubi. She also appeared on ABC's Life As We Know It (2004—2005) in the recurring role of "Mia", the mother of Kelly Osbourne's character. She also reprised her role of Ganos Lal/Morgan le Fay in the direct to DVD movie Stargate: The Ark of Truth. Strange has also appeared on an episode of Sanctuary titled "Kush" as Dr. Allison Grant.

From 2013 to 2019, Strange had a regular co-starring role in the Garage Sale Mysteries franchise of made for television movies from Hallmark.

== Filmography ==
=== Film ===
Year	Title	Role	Notes
1994	Ranma ½: The Movie, Big Trouble in Nekonron, China	Ranma Saotome (voice)	English version
1994	Ranma ½: The Movie 2, Nihao My Concubine	Ranma Saotome (voice)	English version
1996	Ranma ½: One Grew Over the Kuno's Nest	Ranma Saotome (voice)	English version
1997	Dazzle the Dinosaur	Mother Maiasaura (voice)	Short
1997	Kitchen Party	Cynthia	
1999	Second Date	Diane	Short
2004	Dark Arc	Juxta / Lamia	
2004	Pursued	Petra Ghirov	
2005	White Noise	Jane	
2006	.45	Vic	
2008	Stargate: The Ark of Truth	Morgan Le Fay / Ganos Lal	Video
2009	Personal Effects	Janet	
2009	The Zero Sum	Leah Herzog	
2016	Kindergarten Cop 2	Miss Sinclaire	
2016	On the Farm	Elaine	
2024	Aurora Teagarden Mysteries: Death at the Diner	Lauren Walsh	

=== Television ===
Year	Title	Role	Notes
1992–1994	Neon Rider	Rose	2 episodes
1993–1998	Ranma ½	Ranma Saotome (voice)	Main role (Seasons 1-3, OVAs); English version
1993-1997	Madison	Carol Lemieux	Recurring role
1994	The X-Files	Kimberly	Episode: "Duane Barry"
1994–1995	Dino Babies	Franklin (voice)	Main role
1995	Littlest Pet Shop	Rookie (voice)	
1995	Deadlocked: Escape from Zone 14	Layla	TV film
1995	Mixed Blessings	Wanda	TV film
1995	The Outer Limits	Lisa	Episode: "Caught in the Act"
1996	The Outer Limits	Rachel Connors	Episode: "Falling Star"
1996	Sliders	Leah Greenfield	Episode: "Greatfellas"
1996	An Unexpected Family	Claudia	TV film
1996	Poltergeist: The Legacy	Tina	Episode: "The Crystal Scarab"
1997	Poltergeist: The Legacy	Suzy	Episode: "Fear"
1997	Millennium	Maura	Episode: "Force Majeure"
1997	The Adventures of Shirley Holmes	Leah Farrell	Episode: "The Case of the Singer's Secret"
1997	Unwed Father	Sherry	TV film
1998	The Outer Limits	Tara	Episode: "The Hunt"
1998	Poltergeist: The Legacy	Justine	2 episodes
1998	An Unexpected Life	Claudia	TV film
1998	First Wave	Henrietta / Hank	Episode: "Mata Hari"
1998	Cupid	Pierced Nose Girl	Episode: "Pilot"
1998	Welcome to Paradox	Dr. Newman	Episode: "All Our Sins Forgotten"
1998	Viper	Vicky Lee	Episode: "The Full Frankie"
1998–2005	Da Vinci's Inquest	Helen	Recurring role
1999	Foolish Heart	Barbara / Kate	
1999	Nothing Too Good for a Cowboy	Cora Bartlett	Episode: "Wild Horses"
2000	Level 9	Meredith	Episode: "It's Magic"
2001	The Chris Isaak Show	Lisa	Episode: "Hurricane"
2001	Ladies and the Champ	Jenny	TV film
2002	Dark Angel	Nurse Betty / Elizabeth Blanchard	Episode: "Harbor Lights"
2002	Jeremiah	Maggie	Episode: "Out of the Ashes"
2002	The Twilight Zone	Roxanne	Episode: "Gabe's Story"
2003	The Piano Man's Daughter	Alexandra Lamont	TV film
2004	The L Word	Annette Bishop	Episode: "Listen Up"
2004	Touching Evil	Laura Ames	Episode: "Memorial"
2004–2005	Life As We Know It	Mia Tynan	Recurring role
2004–2007	ReGenesis	Jill Langston	Main role
2005	The Newsroom	Susan Murdoch	Recurring role
2006	Stargate SG-1	Morgan Le Fay / Ganos Lal	Episode: "The Pegasus Project"
2006-2008	Men in Trees	Theresa Thomasson	Main role
2008	Sanctuary	Dr. Allison Grant	Episode: "Kush"
2008	The Triple Eight	Erica	Recurring role
2009	Murdoch Mysteries	Annie Oakley	Episode: "Mild Mild West"
2009	Hostile Makeover	Zoe Manville	TV film
2009	The Farm	Sheri Silva	TV film
2010	Life Unexpected	Dr. Rosner	2 episodes
2011	Endgame	Dr. Marcus	Episode: "I Killed Her"
2011	Call Me Fitz	Mommy	Episode: "F*cking Memories"
2012	The Pregnancy Project	Leann Strahle	TV film
2012	The Killing	Claire	Episode: "Numb"
2012–2013	Level Up	P.E. Teacher / Vice-Principal Elmhurst	Recurring role
2013	Garage Sale Mystery	Danielle	TV film
2014	Motive	Jennifer	Episode: "Pitfall"
2014	Honor Student	Erica	TV film
2014	Garage Sale Mystery: All That Glitters	Danielle	TV film
2015	Garage Sale Mystery: The Deadly Room	Danielle	TV film
2015	Garage Sale Mystery: The Wedding Dress	Danielle	TV film
2015	A Christmas Detour	Maxine Harper	TV film
2016	Garage Sale Mystery: Guilty Until Proven Innocent	Danielle	TV film
2016	Garage Sale Mystery: The Novel Murders	Danielle	TV film
2017	Garage Sale Mystery: The Art of Murder	Danielle	TV film
2019	A Summer Romance	Catherine Roberts	TV film
2019	Christmas at Dollywood	Gail	TV film
2020	Legends of Tomorrow	Lachesis	7 episodes
2020–2021	Snowpiercer	Suzanne	5 episodes
2020	Garage Sale Mysteries: Searched & Seized	Dani	TV film
2020	Loudermilk	Sarah	Episode: "There Goes My Baby"
2022	Caught in his Web	Renee	TV film
2022	Must Love Christmas	Fayanne Kanner	TV film
2024	Wild Cards	Kassandra	Episode: "An Accountant to Monete Cristo"
2024	Sight Unseen	Caitlin Stott	Episode: "Leo"
2024	Aurora Teagarden Mysteries: Death at the Diner	Lauren	TV film
2024	Curious Caterer: Forbidden Fruit	Nicola	TV film
2026	Tracker	Antonia Pateras	Episode: "To the Bone"
2026	Garage Sale Mysteries: Murder Takes the Stage	Dani	TV film
2026	Yaga	Alice	2 episodes
