= Puff and the Incredible Mr. Nobody =

1982 animated TV special

- Genre: Animation; Short; Family; Fantasy
- Teleplay by: Romeo Muller
- Story by: Romeo Muller
- Directed by: Fred Wolf
- Starring: Burgess Meredith; David Mendenhall; Diana Dumpis; Joan Gerber; Bob Holt; Billy Jayne; Hal Smith; Robert Ridgely
- Theme music composer: David Richard Cambell; Peter Yarrow
- Country of origin: United States
- Original language: English

Production
- Executive producers: Kevin Hunter; Robert L. Rosen
- Producers: Romeo Muller; Peter Yarrow
- Editor: Rich Harrison
- Running time: 24 minutes
- Production companies: My Company; Murakami Wolf Swenson

Original release
- Network: CBS
- Release: May 17, 1982

Puff and the Incredible Mr. Nobody is a 24-minute animated television special that first aired May 17, 1982 on CBS. The third in a series, it serves as a sequel to Puff the Magic Dragon (1978) and Puff the Magic Dragon in the Land of the Living Lies (1979), with Burgess Meredith returning as the voice of the title character. The special was produced by Fred Wolf Films and also featured the voice of David Mendenhall.

== Plot ==
Puff finds a young boy named Terry who has an overactive imagination, and who therefore has trouble making friends with other children. Instead he has an imaginary friend, a duck wearing a saucepan with a feather as a hat, named Mr. Nobody. When Terry's imagination starts to get him in trouble, Terry begins to blame Mr. Nobody for imagining the things that he has dreamed up, until he ceases to believe that he has any imagination of his own. Eventually, Mr. Nobody abandons him, and Puff must take Terry on a quest to find Mr. Nobody, teaching him along the way to embrace his creativity.

== Ratings ==
The TV short has a rating of 7.6/10 from 99 votes on IMDb.

== Voice cast ==
- Burgess Meredith as Puff
- David Mendenhall as Terry
- Joan Gerber as Mother/Teacher
- Bob Holt as Father
- Billy Jayne as Boy
- Diana Dumpis as Girl
- Hal Smith as Professor Katzendorfer/Bust/World
- Robert Ridgely as Mr. Nobody/Guard
