= David Mendenhall =

American actor (born 1971)

- Born: Oceanside, California, U.S.
- Education: California State University, San Bernardino; University of Southern California; Southwestern Law School
- Occupation: Actor
- Years active: 1980–present

David Mendenhall is an American actor. He is best known for his roles in the movie Over the Top, and the television series The Transformers and The Berenstain Bears.

== Early life and acting career ==
Mendenhall was born in Oceanside, California. He has a younger sister, Marissa. Mendenhall began his acting career at the age of four. In 1980, he started on General Hospital when he was eight years old, portraying Mike Webber on the soap opera. He remained with the series until 1986. During that time, Mendenhall started acting in feature films. Mendenhall made his film debut in the 1983 space Western, Space Raiders, produced by Roger Corman. Notable television appearances during the 80s also included playing Elaine Nardo's son on Taxi on three episodes, and playing a drug dealer in "The Reporter", a very special episode of the sitcom Diff'rent Strokes. The episode featured a guest appearance by then-First Lady Nancy Reagan.

At age 15, Mendenhall portrayed Sylvester Stallone’s son in the 1987 sport drama Over the Top, about a long haul truck driver who tries to win back his alienated son while becoming a champion arm wrestler. That same year, he appeared in the comedy Going Bananas with Dom DeLuise and Jimmie Walker. In 1989, Mendenhall worked on The Secret of the Ice Cave with Sally Kellerman, which was shot in Chile. All three movies were produced by Cannon Films. In 1989, Mendenhall starred opposite Christina Applegate in the drama Streets, once again working with Roger Corman, who produced. On television, Mendenhall had a recurring role on the NBC drama Our House.

== Education and later work ==
In 1994, Mendenhall enrolled in the theater arts program at California State University, San Bernardino. In 1996, he transferred to the University of Southern California and graduated magna cum laude in 1998 with a bachelor's degree. Later that year, Mendenhall attended Southwestern Law School, graduating in 2001.

Mendenhall has since worked at the legal departments of several entertainment companies, including NBCUniversal Television Group, and Buena Vista Home Entertainment. From 2007-08, he was the clearance coordinator for the NBC television program Deal or No Deal. Afterwards he worked in the prize department on GSN Live for the Game Show Network, and later as a prize producer for shows on NBC and Fox.

In 2012, he returned to acting with a brief role in Bobcat Goldthwait's God Bless America.

== Awards ==
- 1984 Soap Opera Digest Award Outstanding Youth Actor in a Daytime Soap Opera for General Hospital
- 1984 Young Artist Award Best Young Actor in Daytime Soap for General Hospital
- 1985 Young Artist Award Best Young Actor in a Daytime or Nighttime Television Series for General Hospital
- 1986 Young Artist Award Outstanding Young Actor - Animation Voice Over for Berenstain Bears
- 1987 Young Artist Award Exceptional Young Actors in Animation - Series, Specials or Feature Film for Rainbow Brite and the Star Stealer. He was also nominated in the same category for The Transformers: The Movie

== Selected filmography ==
Year	Title	Role	Notes
1980	The Last Song	Bobby Pierce	TV movie
1981	The Magic of David Copperfield IV: The Vanishing Airplane	Young David Copperfield	TV movie
1982	Puff and the Incredible Mr. Nobody	Terry	voice
1982	The Smurfs Christmas Special	William	voice
1982	Taxi	Jason	
1983	Space Raiders	Peter	
1980–1986	General Hospital	Mike Webber	
1983	Goodnight, Beantown	Alex	
1983	Diff'rent Strokes	Sidney	
1984	Saturday Supercade	Joey	(Kangaroo segment)
1984	The Cabbage Patch Kids' First Christmas	Cousin Cannon Lee	voice
1985	The Twilight Zone	Richard "Dickie" Jordan Jr.	"Examination Day"
1985	Rainbow Brite	Krys	voice
1985	Rainbow Brite and the Star Stealer	Krys	voice
1985	Galtar and the Golden Lance	Zorn	voice
1985	The Berenstain Bears	Brother Bear	voice
1985	G.I. Joe	Fairmont Boy	voice
1985	CBS Storybreak	Henry Green	Chocolate Fever
1985	It's Punky Brewster!	Additional Voices	voice
1986	Witchfire	Hunter's Son	
1986	The Transformers: The Movie	Daniel Witwicky	voice
1986	The Transformers season 3 and 4	Daniel Witwicky	voice
1986	Potato Head Kids	Big Chip	voice
1986	The Centurions	Randy Chang	voice
1986	Our House	J.R. Dutton	
1987	Over the Top	Michael Hawk	
1987	Going Bananas	Ben	
1987	They Still Call Me Bruce	Billy White	
1987	Pound Puppies	Oran	Snow Puppies
1988	Family Medical Center	Guest Star	unknown episodes
1988	A Pup Named Scooby-Doo	Additional Voices	voice
1988	The Greatest Adventure: Stories from the Bible	Additional Voices	The Creation
1989	The Secret of the Ice Cave	Alex Ostrow	
1990	Streets	Sy	
1997	Roseanne	Clerk	uncredited
2008	My Own Worst Enemy	Paul Wallace	
2009	The Forgotten	Newsstand Clerk	
2011	God Bless America	Roxy's Father	
2011	A Gifted Man	Peter Glenn	
2014	A Help From Above	Kerr	
