= The Little Clowns of Happytown =

- Genre: Children
- Based on: A concept by Anthony Paul Productions
- Developed by: Chuck Lorre
- Written by: Bruce Faulk; Cliff Roberts
- Directed by: Vincent Davis; John Kafka; Brian Ray; George Singer
- Voices of: Sue Blu; Charlie Adler; Danny Cooksey; Frank Welker; Ron Palillo; Pat Fraley; Josh Rodine; Ellen Gerstell; Howard Morris
- Theme music composer: Dennis C. Brown; Chuck Lorre; Anthony Paul Productions
- Composer: Robert J. Walsh
- Country of origin: United States
- Original language: English
- No. of seasons: 1
- No. of episodes: 18

Production
- Executive producer: Fred Wolf
- Running time: 30 minutes
- Production companies: Murakami Wolf Swenson; ABC Entertainment; Marvel Productions

Original release
- Network: ABC
- Release: September 26, 1987 – July 16, 1988

The Little Clowns of Happytown is an American animated television series that aired as part of ABC's Saturday morning lineup from September 26, 1987 to July 16, 1988.

== Plot ==
The series is set around young clowns from Happytown, whose goal is to spread happiness and imbue positive mental attitudes to the city next door. The young clowns are Big Top (the leader), Badum-Bump (Big Top's little brother), Hiccup (Big Top's helper), Tickles (Hiccup's best friend), Pranky (Big Top's best friend), and Blooper (Hiccup's big brother), along with their pet elephant, Rover, and their mentor, Mr. Pickleherring. They are also accompanied by the clownimals, clown-like animals that only Badum-Bump can understand. The only thing that stands in their way is Awful B. Bad and his minions, Geek and Whiner.

== Characters ==
- Big Top is the series protagonist and the leader of the Little Clowns, who loves to tell jokes. He wears a top hat in the style of a ringmaster.
- Blooper is a clumsy clown who likes to do physical comedy. He is also involved in many acts by accident.
- Hiccup is Blooper's younger sister, who loves to sing songs but often hiccups when she talks.
- Tickles loves to giggle and can fix anything.
- Pranky loves to prank people by throwing custard pies at them, only to sometimes get them in his face by accident.
- Badum-Bump is Big Top's younger brother, who only speaks by making sounds.
- Rover is Badum-Bump's pet elephant and partner.
- Clownimals are the colorful clown-like animals that accompany the little clowns. Badum-Bump is the only one who understands them. There are nine of them: Lion, Tiger, Bear, Seal, Penguin, Giraffe, Rhino, Zebra and Kangaroo.
- Mr. Pickleherring is the kids' enthusiastic teacher, who often teaches them how to be funny and helps with their morals.
- Awful B. Bad is the main antagonist of the series, who wants the world to be gloomy just like him.
- Geek is Bebad's red-headed assistant. Despite working for Awful B. Bad, he is actually nice and is friends with Blooper.
- Whiner is Bebad's other assistant and a teenager who whines and often informs Bebad on what is going on.

== Cast ==
- Sue Blu as Hiccup
- Charlie Adler as Pranky and Awful B. Bad (in some episodes)
- Danny Cooksey as Big Top
- Frank Welker as Badum-Bump, Rover the Elephant, Clownimals
- Ron Palillo as Whiner
- Pat Fraley as Awful B. Bad, Geek
- Josh Rodine as Blooper
- Ellen Gerstell as Tickles
- Howard Morris as Mr. Pickleherring

== Production ==
Marvel Productions and ABC had brought in consulting company Q5 Corporation to help develop the show along with other series for the 1987–1988 season. Q5's consultants consist of psychology PhDs and advertising, marketing and research professionals. Marvel had already used Q5 to develop their Defenders of the Earth series, so ABC brought them in for the 1987–88 season to improve its kid appeal on its Saturday morning offerings to get out of third place in the ratings.

A Little Clowns former story editor indicated in September 1987 to the Los Angeles Times regarding Q5 consulting on the series:

They aren't merely researching trends; they're trying to engage in social engineering. There's absolutely no passion with these people. There is no sense of honor, of anger, of deep emotion, of love. They're bland-izers; they try to hammer out all of the high and low points of being a human being. I can see we're not doing Dostoevsky on Saturday morning, but there has to be some leeway to create characters who are free to express themselves.

Fred Wolf and his Murakami Wolf Swenson were also brought in to produce the series.

The show was promoted as a part of the third annual ABC Family Fun Fair, which brought the voice talent of the characters to perform highlights of their show. The show stopped in Oklahoma City from Friday August 28 through Sunday August 30, 1987.

Little Clowns was unsuccessful in boosting ABC's ratings. ABC children's programming vice president Squire Rushnell blamed the recently introduced people meter for the show's failure, noting that young children had neither the dexterity nor the interest to operate the device, and thus any program aimed at young children as Little Clowns was doomed to ratings failure. Rushnell responded by commissioning The New Adventures of Winnie the Pooh, in the hopes that older children who knew how to operate the people meter would recognize and like the program; that program would prove to be a major success among whole family audiences.

== Episodes ==
No.	Title	Original release date
1	"Baby Blues"	September 12, 1987
2	"Big Heart, Sweet Heart"	September 19, 1987
3	"Carnival Crashers"	September 26, 1987
4	"Clowny Exchange"	October 3, 1987
5	"Won't You Please Come Home Blooper Geek?"	October 10, 1987
6	"BeBad's Pet Peeve"	October 17, 1987
7	"City Clowns, Country Clowns"	October 24, 1987
8	"I Love Mom"	October 31, 1987
9	"Don't Be Angry"	May 7, 1988
10	"I Can Do It"	May 14, 1988
11	"Lost and Not Found"	May 21, 1988
12	"New Dad, No Dad"	May 28, 1988
13	"Nobody's Useless"	June 4, 1988
14	"When You Lost, S.T.O.P"	June 11, 1988
15	"The Chosen Clown"	June 18, 1988
16	"Everyone Has a Talent"	July 2, 1988
17	"To Mr. Pickleherring with Love"	July 9, 1988
18	"Too Scared Too Laugh"	July 16, 1988

== Reception ==
The Los Angeles Times was critical of the show, with writer Charles Solomon suggesting children sleep through the show and skip it. Solomon also criticized it as a soulless copy of NBC's Smurfs, including the overuse of "clown" the same way "smurf" would replace action verbs to create a show-specific language.

== Joking Around with the Little Clowns ==
During the show's run, ABC aired a series of short segments called Joking Around with the Little Clowns, which ran during the commercial breaks of their other Saturday morning programming and featured one of the clowns telling another a joke. Although The Little Clowns of Happytown was cancelled after a single season, the Joking Around with the Little Clowns segments continued to run on ABC for another two years.

== Broadcast ==
The series was broadcast on ABC from September 17, 1987 through July 16, 1988. The series was rebroadcast on The Family Channel between 1989 and 1990.

== Home releases ==
In the United Kingdom, several volumes of The Little Clowns of Happytown were released on VHS by Tempo Video in 1988, each containing three episodes. A compilation video of the Joking Around With the Little Clowns segments was later released in the United States by Strand-VCI Entertainment in 1991.

In 2014, several episodes of the series were released on Region 1 DVD as part of the Mill Creek Entertainment compilation TV Guide Spotlight: Totally '80s Toons which also includes Heathcliff, The Littles, Dennis the Menace, The Get Along Gang, Care Bears and Nellie the Elephant.
