= Budgie the Little Helicopter =

1994–1996 British TV series

- Title card
- Genre: Animated series
- Created by: Sarah Ferguson
- Developed by: The Sleepy Kids Company
- Written by: Brian Trueman
- Directed by: Gary Blatchford
- Voices of: Richard Pearce; Abigail MacVean; Jeremy Nicholas; Kerry Shale; Ray Lonnen; Tony Jackson; Melvyn Hayes; William Vanderpuye; Pippa Haywood; Peter Lloyd; Ania Sowinski; Zoe Hodges; Adrian Hansel; Jeff Rawle; Judy Bennett; Jill Lidstone; Eve Karpf; Gary Martin; Susan Sheridan
- Narrated by: Jeff Rawle
- Theme music composer: Paul K. Joyce
- Composer: Dennis C. Brown
- Countries of origin: United Kingdom; Ireland
- Original language: English
- No. of series: 3
- No. of episodes: 39

Production
- Executive producers: Dan Maddicot; Martin Powell; Viven Schrager Powell; Fred Wolf
- Producers: Michael Algar; Sarah Ferguson
- Running time: 10 minutes per episode (approx.)
- Production companies: Fred Wolf Films Dublin; The Sleepy Kids Company; HTV West; Scottish Television; Flowco Animation (series 2–3); Daiwon Animation (overseas production)

Original release
- Network: ITV (CITV)
- Release: 4 January 1994 – 25 March 1996

Budgie the Little Helicopter is a British animated television series, relating to a fictional helicopter and his friends, based on a series of children's books. The characters were based on the books by Sarah Ferguson. The show was co-produced by Fred Wolf Films Dublin, The Sleepy Kids Company and Sarah Ferguson, then Duchess of York, for HTV West and Scottish Television, and originally aired on British television in 1994 on CITV, where it ran for 39 episodes. A range of books, toys, videos and other merchandise were released under the Budgie label.

The show aired in the United States on FOX as part of the Fox Cubhouse programming block from 1995 to 1996, and moved to the Fox Family Channel in 1999 as part of It's Itsy Bitsy Time. The series was redubbed with North American voices for It's Itsy Bitsy Time. In Canada, it also aired on Family Channel from 1994 to 1997 and on Treehouse TV from 1999 to 2003.

On release of the first book, Ferguson was accused by the media of copying the idea for the series from an out-of-print 1960 book called Hector the Helicopter, by A.W. Baldwin, which she denied.

The series is legally available on Ferguson's official YouTube channel.

== Main characters ==
=== Aircraft ===
- Budgie (voiced by Richard Pearce) is a helicopter with a large baseball cap covering his airframe and a small tuft of hair underneath it. A teddy bear named Snowy is nearly always seen carried in a pocket on Budgie's starboard side. He lives and works at Harefield Airfield, and is best friends with Pippa. His catchphrase is "Rocketing rotors!"
- Pippa (voiced by Abigail MacVean) is a single-engined monoplane with a tuft of hair and a large bow attached to her roof. When she first arrives at Harefield, she and Budgie compete over who is the better and fastest aircraft, but soon become best friends.
- Chuck (voiced by Kerry Shale) is the largest aircraft at Harefield who is tasked with most of the heavy lifting. An American Boeing CH-47 Chinook helicopter, he wears a cap with a visible crew cut underneath.
- Lionel (voiced by Jeremy Nicholas) is the senior helicopter in the series who is in charge of the aircraft at Harefield. He sports a modern-era pilot's cap, moustache, and a collar. His catchphrase is "Juddering joysticks!"

=== Non-aircraft/ground characters ===
- Dell (voiced by Jeff Rawle, who also serves as the narrator) is the baggage cart tow truck.
- Smokey is the airfield fire engine.
- Don is the stairs lorry.
- Backhoe is the backhoe loader.
- Nosey is the driller.
- Ernest is the tractor.

=== Human characters ===
- The control tower operator (unseen)
- Ben and Lucy Kitchen – twin children; brother and sister
- Mrs. Nancy Kitchen is the twins' mother.
- Ken Wrench and Mike Sprocket are mechanics.

== Episodes ==
=== Series 1 (1994) ===
No.	Title	Summary	Original air date
1	"Pippa Arrives"	Pippa, the new arrival, comes to Harefield, but her ensuing rivalry with Budgie causes chaos at the airfield.	4 Jan 1994
2	"Chuck Comes Unstuck"	Chuck's shenanigans cause many mishaps at the Harefield fete.	11 Jan 1994
3	"Budgie's Blizzard"	During a blizzard, Budgie must act as a flying ambulance to rush a pregnant woman to the hospital when she is about to give birth.	18 Jan 1994
4	"Ice Work, Budgie"	After running out of fuel during the midnight hospital run, Budgie finds that the field on which he landed is actually a frozen pond. Pippa then gets stuck in a snowdrift while delivering his fuel.	25 Jan 1994
5	"Budgie Takes a Catch"	After Budgie laughs at Lionel's mishap with a vacuum cleaner, he is not allowed to take part in the Harefield airshow and ends up on lobster duty as a punishment. After he accidentally loses the lobsters, he gets called to a fog rescue.	1 Feb 1994
6	"The Air Show"	Budgie and his friends take part in the airshow, but two suspicious men arrive on the big day and steal Genevieve, the visiting aeroplane from France.	8 Feb 1994
7	"All at Sea"	Budgie delivers parts to a navy ship but has to spend the night on board an aircraft carrier due to a storm.	15 Feb 1994
8	"Boats, Boots and Budgie"	The river overflows, flooding Harefield. Budgie, returning from the aircraft carrier, locates the source of the flood and attempts to fix it whilst rescuing a stranded cow.	22 Feb 1994
9	"Copters and Robbers"	The two criminals from the airshow return to Harefield but are spotted. They steal a truck with the twins, Ben and Lucy, as unwitting stowaways, forcing Budgie and Pippa to give chase.	1 Mar 1994
10	"Daydreams and Candyfloss"	Budgie mistakenly ends up in a seaside town after rescuing the twins, and has to wait for Pippa to guide him home. He helps some people after they get stuck on a broken rollercoaster, while Pippa helps with a sand race.	8 Mar 1994
11	"Flying in Arctic Circles"	All the aircraft at Harefield, along with Ken and Mike the mechanics, visit the Arctic Circle for an expedition. Budgie helps a fishing trawler which has become frozen, then rescues one of the professors of the expedition after he slips into a volcano.	15 Mar 1994
12	"What's Bruin?"	During their Arctic Circle visit, Pippa, Ken and Mike are stranded on an ice floe broken off from shore. The mechanics are chased by a polar bear, until Budgie arrives to chase it away. He later saves a baby whale.	22 Mar 1994
13	"Down on the Farm"	Farmer Hayes falls ill and cannot do his daily chores, leaving Ernest the tractor to ask for the aircraft at Harefield to help out. After much hard work, Lionel's engine overheats and a stray spark from it sets the hay on fire. Smokey's lack of water leaves Lionel in danger, and it is up to Budgie to save the day.	29 Mar 1994

=== Series 2 (1995) ===
No.	Title	Summary	Original air date
1	"Budgie Sticks to It"	A new airport is being built and Budgie decides to visit it. When he lands to introduce himself to Backhoe the digger, he gets stuck in quick-drying cement. Backhoe's colleague, Nosey, manages to drill him out after much effort, but Lionel is not pleased about Budgie's antics.	17 Jan 1995
2	"Skids, Stunts and Soap"	Patsy the Pitts Special visits Harefield and impresses everyone with her stunt flying. Pippa tries to copy her, but becomes dizzy and sick.	24 Jan 1995
3	"Aliens Have Landed"	While Lionel is out on a job, Budgie hears that aliens are invading them thanks to a radio.	31 Jan 1995
4	"Who's a Clever Budgie?"	Chuck brings in a crate of nuts from Brazil, and a stowaway parrot that proves quick to cause mayhem. Unbeknownst to them, the crates also contain stolen statues that are being targeted by two thieves lurking around Harefield.	7 Feb 1995
5	"Blown Up, Let Down"	Pippa plays a prank on Budgie in retaliation for a tongue-in-cheek insult. She pretends to be on board a Super Guppy transporter plane headed for America, but her prank backfires when Budgie futilely follows the Guppy and gets lost at sea after running out of fuel.	14 Feb 1995
6	"Wally Waddles In"	Wally, an elderly Supermarine Walrus, visits Harefield and stops a boat thief during a visit to the beach.	21 Feb 1995
7	"The Balloon Goes Up"	During a hot air balloon festival near Harefield, Mrs. Kitchen and the twins go up in a balloon which loses control and drifts towards the new airport. Budgie rescues them after they land in a tree, whilst Chuck mistakes the animal-themed balloons for monsters.	28 Feb 1995
8	"Surprise, Surprise"	Heavy pipes fall on top of the heliwash, badly damaging it in the process. Mrs. Kitchen is baking a cake for Ken's birthday, but the others mistake it for Budgie's.	7 Mar 1995
9	"Deep Sleep"	Wally recounts a time in his youth of saving a man from a shark on a stormy night at sea, causing Budgie to have a bizarre dream.	14 Mar 1995
10	"Bad News, Good News"	Harefield is about to be closed and replaced by a factory. Budgie rallies all his aircraft friends, including Backhoe and Nosey, to prevent it from happening.	21 Mar 1995
11	"Budgie Barges In"	All the aircraft from Harefield travel to France for an air show. Mike is about to refuel Budgie, but Ken tells him to do it later in the belief that Budgie will not be flying anywhere for the day. When Genevieve takes Budgie and Pippa sightseeing around Paris, Budgie runs out of fuel and has to land on a moving river barge which is heading towards a low bridge. Chuck must rescue him before it is too late.	28 Mar 1995
12	"Dutch Courage"	On the way back from France, the aircraft have to drop a delivery off in the Netherlands. Budgie is embarrassed when he accidentally mistakes a windmill for a helicopter. Later, he and Pippa also manage to delay flower pickers by mistaking them for thieves. Budgie is then hailed as a hero after he rescues a small boy, Franz, who accidentally falls into the river.	4 Apr 1995
13	"Budgie's Opening Goal"	The new Harefield airport is finally opened, and Budgie aids the Minister for Airports.	11 Apr 1995

=== Series 3 (1996) ===
No.	Title	Summary	Original air date
1	"Boom, Boom, Budgie"	Budgie tries to break the sound barrier during a tyre mix-up.	2 Jan 1996
2	"Writers in the Sky"	Budgie and an airship save the day when Chuck crashes into a cold pond.	9 Jan 1996
3	"Double Trouble"	Budgie and Chuck discover that Pippa has been replaced by an evil twin who is in league with two criminals attempting to steal Harefield's business.	16 Jan 1996
4	"Eye in the Sky"	Budgie is tasked with being a traffic helicopter for the day, but more trouble ensues in the process.	23 Jan 1996
5	"Chuck's Buddy"	When Chuck's old friend Buddy the sky crane arrives, he tries to remake things just the way he knows, only for disaster to strike.	30 Jan 1996
6	"The Aqueduct"	The aqueduct is under threat of collapsing due to erosion from a water pipe.	6 Feb 1996
7	"Plane Silly"	Budgie has to search for Ben and Lucy's lost model plane while a statue is coming to Harefield.	13 Feb 1996
8	"The Plane Who Cried Wolf"	Jasper the jeer jet has been constantly lying, so no one believes that he is in trouble. Budgie comes to his aid regardless.	20 Feb 1996
9	"The Runaway Train"	Jake the steam engine is pulling a royal carriage, and his brakes are crippled when he tries to stop quickly. It is up to Budgie to try and stop him before an accident occurs.	26 Feb 1996
10	"A Tail of Woe"	Lionel badly damages his tail rotor when he tries to avoid Ben and Lucy Kitchen's rabbits. Budgie sets out to find a new replacement before the twins find the lost rabbits.	4 Mar 1996
11	"Put Up or Stuck Up"	The air museum has opened at Harefield at last, and Budgie has to complete all his tasks on time for it.	11 Mar 1996
12	"Silent Flight"	The aircraft all set out to rescue some skiers stranded on a snowy mountain while flying with the gliders, all whilst Budgie helps Gloria take off on her own.	18 Mar 1996
13	"Ups & Downs"	Chuck is punished for mock imitation by having to pick up all the rotten vegetables on board a ship. Budgie is delivering pieces for a new bridge, but he soon spots two people trying to catch a dolphin and has to rescue a construction scout submarine entangled in their net.	25 Mar 1996

== Home video releases ==
=== United Kingdom ===
The series was released on VHS in the United Kingdom by First Independent Films.

VHS title	VHS number	Release date	Episodes
Budgie the Little Helicopter Pippa Arrives	VA30318	7 March 1994	"Pippa Arrives", "Chuck Comes Unstuck", "Budgie's Blizzard", "Ice Work, Budgie", "Budgie Takes a Catch"
Budgie the Little Helicopter The Air Show	VA30336	7 November 1994	"The Air Show", "All at Sea", "Boats, Boots and Budgie", "Copters and Robbers"
Budgie the Little Helicopter Daydreams and Candy Floss	VA30359	6 March 1995	"Daydreams and Candy Floss", "Flying in Arctic Circles", "What's Bruin?", "Down on the Farm"
Budgie the Little Helicopter Budgie Sticks To It	VA30372	3 July 1995	"Budgie Sticks to It", "Skids, Stunts and Soap", "Aliens Have Landed", "Who's a Clever Budgie?", "Blown Up, Let Down"
Budgie the Little Helicopter Wally Waddles In	VA30394	6 November 1995	"Wally Waddles In", "The Balloon Goes Up", "Surprise, Surprise", "Deep Sleep"
Budgie the Little Helicopter The Complete First Series	VA30626	13 May 1996	"Pippa Arrives", "Chuck Comes Unstuck", "Budgie's Blizzard", "Ice Work, Budgie", "Budgie Takes a Catch", "The Air Show", "All at Sea", "Boats, Boots and Budgie", "Copters and Robbers", "Daydreams and Candy Floss", "Flying in Arctic Circles", "What's Bruin?", "Down on the Farm"
Budgie the Little Helicopter The Complete Second Series	VA30647	7 October 1996	"Budgie Sticks to It", "Skids, Stunts and Soap", "Aliens Have Landed", "Who's a Clever Budgie?", "Blown Up, Let Down", "Wally Waddles In", "The Balloon Goes Up", "Surprise, Surprise", "Deep Sleep", "Bad News, Good News", "Budgie Barges In", "Dutch Courage", "Budgie's Opening Goal"
Budgie the Little Helicopter The Complete Third Series	VA30680	3 March 1997	"Boom Boom Budgie", "Writers in the Sky", "Double Trouble", "Eye in the Sky", "Chuck's Buddy", "The Aqueduct", "Plane Silly", "The Plane Who Cried Wolf", "The Runaway Train", "A Tail of Woe", "Put Up or Stuck Up", "Silent Flight", "Ups & Downs"

In 2004, Columbia TriStar Home Entertainment (through the Universal Columbia Alliance venture) released "The Air Show" on DVD, containing the same episodes as the VHS counterpart.

In 2006, Right Entertainment and Universal Pictures Video released a single DVD titled "Pippa Arrives", containing five assorted episodes from the first series.

=== Internationally ===
In 1997, UAV Entertainment released some episodes of the series on individual VHS tapes in the United States.

In 2007, Jigsaw Entertainment released the complete series on DVD in Australia and New Zealand.
