= Puff the Magic Dragon (TV special) =

1978 American animated television special

- Genre: Animation; Fantasy; Family; Short
- Written by: Romeo Muller
- Directed by: Charles Swenson; Fred Wolf
- Starring: Burgess Meredith; Frank Nelson; Robert Ridgely; Regis Cordic
- Theme music composer: Peter Yarrow; David Richard Cambell
- Country of origin: United States
- Original language: English

Production
- Executive producers: Kevin Hunter; Robert L. Rosen
- Producers: Charles Swenson; Peter Yarrow; Romeo Muller
- Editor: Rich Harrison
- Running time: 24 minutes
- Production companies: Murakami Wolf Swenson; Yarrow/Muller-My Company

Original release
- Network: CBS
- Release: October 30, 1978

Puff the Magic Dragon is a 30-minute animated television special based on the song of the same name made notable by Peter, Paul and Mary. First aired October 30, 1978, on CBS, and produced by Fred Wolf Films, it features Burgess Meredith as the voice of the title character. Kenner Products and Hershey Foods were the special's primary advertisers in its original broadcast.

The special was followed by two sequels: Puff the Magic Dragon in the Land of the Living Lies (1979) and Puff and the Incredible Mr. Nobody (1982).

== Plot ==
The film begins with Puff's narration about a little boy named Jackie Draper, who is filled with so much self-doubt and fear that he has stopped talking altogether. His parents are so concerned that they have three doctors examine him, and they say it is hopeless and that little Jackie will never talk again. Jackie returns to his room, where he sits until Puff comes to his bedroom window and starts a conversation with him.

Puff invites himself in, talks to Jackie about inner happiness, and pulls a long sheet of paper out of a magic bag. He cuts the paper into a paper doll shaped like Jackie and dubs it Jackie Paper. He explains that Jackie Paper can do anything and then asks if he can put his happiness into it. After he does so, the paper doll version of Jackie comes to life, and Puff then begins to make plans to go to Honalee, which is located by the sea. Jackie admits he is afraid. Puff then helps Jackie make a boat using things in Jackie's room, such as string, sealing wax, and the frame of his bed.

They set out onto the ocean, where they meet a boat filled with kings and princes in the shape of cards. Afterward, Jackie says he was afraid of pirates after hearing about them. They then run into Very Long John Black and Bluebeard Kidd, a giant pirate who takes them to his island. While they await their fate, Puff says that Very Long John will not be scary if they get to know him. They then view his inner desire with Puff's magic smoke rings which have the power to reveal hidden things. It reveals that Very Long John secretly wishes to be a baker. Jackie challenges (with a verse from Billy Boy) Very Long John to bake a cherry pie, which he does, and subsequently expresses that he always wanted to be a baker, but never believed he could do it and was afraid he could not change from being a pirate. Jackie prompts him to make this change, and Very Long John expresses his gratitude to Jackie and Puff.

They continue their journey until they reach the starless sky, where jealous clouds block out the brightness of the stars. One of the stars falls, and Puff instructs Jackie to take the small star to the sky with the boat, which Puff gives butterfly wings. In order for the ship to fly, Puff has to get out of the boat, leaving Jackie alone to face his fears. Jackie then returns the star to the sky, brightening the sky. Puff rewards Jackie with a medal for bravery.

Eventually they reach Honalee, which, instead of a paradise, turns out to be a gloomy place. This is revealed to be the work of living sneezes that out of depression made the place gloomy to fit their mood. Puff then orders Jackie to leave, as this is no place for him. After that Puff sadly walks to his cave, realizing he was not brave enough to defeat the sneezes. He is then reunited with Jackie, who returns with Very Long John and his chicken soup to cure the living sneezes of their colds, making them happy. They then return Honalee to its happy glory by singing.

Once this is done, Puff and Jackie go back to Jackie's room and return Jackie to his body. Puff tells Jackie that thanks to his bravery he is now healed and is strong again, and thanks Jackie for helping him too. Puff tells Jackie that he must be brave to face growing up, that 'time is far stronger than magic.' Jackie says he'll never forget about Puff, to which puff replies, "We'll see." Puff leaves as Jackie's parents come into the room to find Jackie happy and talking again. They then hug Jackie and express their love for him. The film ends with Puff asking the audience if they just saw a dragon walk by, similar to what he asked Jackie at the beginning of the story.

== Voice cast ==
- Burgess Meredith as Puff
- Philip Tanzini as Jackie
- Peter Yarrow as Father
- Maitzi Morgan as Mother/Star
- Robert Ridgely as Pirate/Pieman/Sneeze
- Regis Cordic as Bald Doctor
- Frank Nelson as Tall Doctor
- Charles Woolf as Short Doctor

== Other media ==
In September 1979, a picture book adaptation of the special was published by Avon Books. It is dedicated to Peter, Paul, and Mary. Words and sheet music to several songs that are featured in the special can be found at the back of the book, including "The Boat Song" and "Weave Me the Sunshine". The book also makes use of the original song throughout, as the special does.

The head of Puff can also be seen on the green dragon in the music video for "Weird Al" Yankovic's song "Another Tattoo".
