= Dark Arc =

2004 film by Dan Zukovic

- Directed by: Dan Zukovic
- Written by: Dan Zukovic
- Produced by: David Barnett; Jeremy Dyson; Brendan Keown; Mitch Mayer
- Starring: Sarah Strange; Dan Zukovic; Kurt Max Runte
- Cinematography: Geoff Denham
- Edited by: Stephen Cammarano; Patrick Carroll
- Music by: Neil Burnett
- Distributed by: Third Tribe Productions
- Release date: 2004
- Running time: 99 minutes
- Country: Canada
- Language: English
- Budget: $250,000 CAD (estimated)

Dark Arc, which premiered in 2004, is the second independent feature film by the writer/director/actor Dan Zukovic.

== Reception ==
Dark Arc premiered at the Montreal World Film Festival in 2004 and was shown at other festivals including Cinequest, The Calgary International Film Festival, The Edmonton International Film Festival, The Quebec City International Film Festival, The Charlotte Film Festival, The Portobello Film Festival, the Nickel Independent Film and Video Festival and the American Cinematheque Festival of Film Noir.

Called "Absolutely brilliant...truly and completely different...something you've never tasted before" by Film Threat writer Eric Campos, the film was named one of Film Threat's "Indies to look out for in 2006". The leading actress, Sarah Strange, was nominated for "Best Lead Performance - Female in a Feature Length Drama" at the 2005 BC Film Industry Leo Awards for her role in the film.

In August 2010, the film was released on DVD by Vanguard Cinema.
