= Jimmy T. Murakami =

American film director (1933–2014)

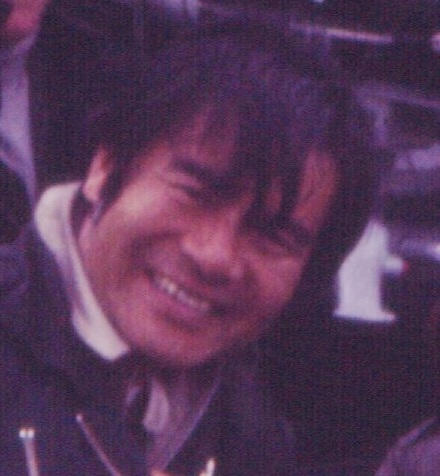
- Jimmy Murakami in 1970
- Born: Teruaki Murakami; June 5, 1933; San Jose, California, U.S.
- Died: February 16, 2014 (aged 80); Dublin, Ireland
- Citizenship: American; Irish (Note: By naturalization.)
- Occupations: Animator; designer; artist; director
- Known for: Founder of Fred Wolf Films Dublin
- Spouse: Ethna Murakami
- Children: 2

Teruaki "Jimmy T." Murakami (村上輝明, Murakami Teruaki; June 5, 1933 – February 16, 2014) was an American animator and film director with a long career working in numerous countries. Among his best-known works are the animated adaptations of the Raymond Briggs books When the Wind Blows and The Snowman. He was nominated for an Academy Award for Best Animated Short Film for The Magic Pear Tree (1968).

== Early life and education ==
On June 5, 1933, Murakami was born in San Jose, California. At age 9, following the signing of Executive Order 9066, Murakami was interned with his Japanese-American family at the Tule Lake War Relocation Center, a concentration camp in northern California. After the end of World War II, Murakami and his family settled in Los Angeles, California.

Murakami attended Chouinard Art Institute in Los Angeles.

== Career ==
In 1955, Murakami was an animator at UPA in Burbank. Murakami worked on the Boing Boing Show.

Following a short stint with Toei Animation in Tokyo, Murakami joined TVC in London in 1960. He returned to Los Angeles in 1965, and established Murakami Wolf Productions. Murakami then moved to Ireland in 1971 and established Quarteru Films.

Murakami formed Murakami-Wolf Films with Fred Wolf. He also directed the music video for "King of the Mountain", the single from Kate Bush's album Aerial. In 1989, with his former partner Fred Wolf, he established Murakami Wolf Dublin to produce the hit animation series Teenage Mutant Ninja Turtles.

He also worked on 3 films for Roger Corman in the 70s-80s, including directing Battle Beyond The Stars, as well as Les pêcheurs de perles for Pascavision in 1993.

Murakami was the subject of a 2010 feature documentary film made by Irish director Sé Merry Doyle and produced by Martina Durac and Vanessa Gildea of Loopline Films called Jimmy Murakami - Non Alien which premiered in Dublin at the 2010 IFI Stranger than Fiction Film Festival.

== Personal life ==
Murakami died at the age of 80 on February 16, 2014, in Dublin, Ireland. He was survived by his wife, Ethna and their two Irish-born daughters, Deirdre and Claire.

== Filmography ==
| Year | Title | Art / Animation department | Director | Producer | Writer | Notes |
|---|---|---|---|---|---|---|
| 1957 | Trees and Jamaica Daddy | Yes | | | | Designer; Short (segment "Jamaica Daddy") |
| 1958 | Sailing and Village Band | Yes | | | | Designer; Short (segment "Village Band") |
| 1959 | Picnics Are Fun and Dino's Serenade | Yes | | | | Designer; Short (segment "Dino's Serenade") |
| 1959 | 1001 Arabian Nights | Yes | | | | Layout artist (uncredited); Theatrical film |
| 1959 | The Violinist | Yes | | | | Animator; Short |
| 1961 | The Insects | Yes | Yes | | Yes | Animator; Short |
| 1964 | The Top | Yes | Yes | | Story | Animator; Short |
| 1965 | Charley | | Yes | | | TV movie |
| 1967 | George... the People | Yes | Yes | | | Animator; Short Produced for US Information Agency |
| 1967 | The Box | | | Yes | | Short |
| 1967 | Breath | Yes | Yes | Yes | Story | Animator and designer Short |
| 1968 | And Of Course You | | Yes | | Story (with Chuck Swenson) | Short; Produced for US Information Agency |
| 1968 | The Magic Pear Tree | | | Yes | Story | Short; Oscar nomination |
| 1969 | The Good Friend | | Yes | Yes | | |
| 1971 | The Point | | | Yes | | TV Movie, uncredited |
| 1971 | Von Richthofen and Brown | Yes | | Associate | | Art director & Second unit director (uncredited); Theatrical film |
| 1972 | Clerow Wilson and the Miracle of P.S. 14 | Yes | | | | Animator; TV Movie |
| 1973 | The Naked Ape | Yes | | | | Animator; Theatrical film |
| 1974 | The Mad Magazine TV Special | | Yes | | | TV movie |
| 1974 | Free to Be... You & Me | Yes | | | | Animator and graphic designer TV Movie |
| 1975 | Passing | | Yes | | | Short |
| 1979 | Death of a Bullet | | Yes | | | Short |
| 1980 | Humanoids from the Deep | | Yes | | | Uncredited; Theatrical film |
| 1980 | Battle Beyond the Stars | | Yes | | | Theatrical film |
| 1981 | Heavy Metal | Yes | Yes | | | Animator; Theatrical film (segment "Soft Landing") |
| 1982 | The Snowman | | Supervising | | | TV Short |
| 1986 | When the Wind Blows | | Yes | | | Music video by David Bowie |
| 1986 | When the Wind Blows | Yes | Yes | | | Special sequence animator (segment ''Military Command Sequence''); Storyboard artist Theatrical film |
| 1988 | The Lion, the Witch, & the Wardrobe | Yes | | | | Animation director Mini-Series, 2 episodes |
| 1989 | Teenage Mutant Ninja Turtles | | | Yes | | TV series, seasons 1-5 |
| 1990 | Dream Express | | Yes | | Yes | Short |
| 1992 | Urbanus: Het lustige kapoentje | Yes | Yes | Yes | | Storyboard artist Short |
| 1993 | Opéra imaginaire | | Yes | | | TV movie (segment "Pêcheurs de perles") |
| 1995-1997 | The Story Keepers | | Supervising | | | TV series, 13 episodes |
| 1998 | Oi! Get Off Our Train | | Yes | | | TV Short |
| 1998 | The Bear | Yes | | | | Storyboard consultant Short |
| 2001 | Christmas Carol: The Movie | Yes | Yes | | | Storyboard artist Theatrical film |
| 2005 | King of the Mountain | | Yes | | | Music video by Kate Bush |
| 2008 | Sandpiper | | Yes | | | Short |
| 2010 | Jimmy Murakami: Non Alien | Yes | | | | Animator & voice appearance Documentary |

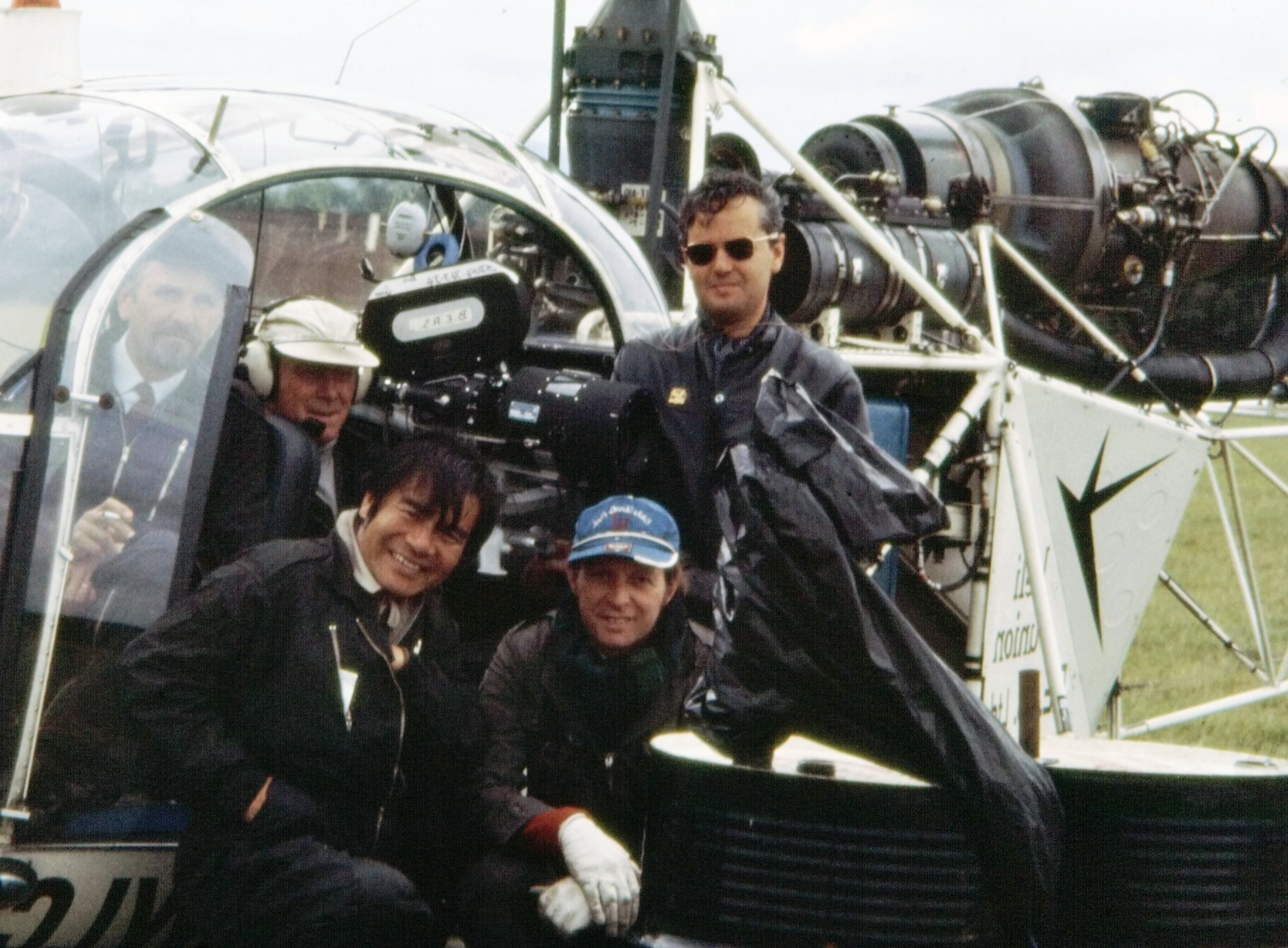
Camera crew from Von Richthofen & Brown, 1970. Peter Peckowski and Peter Allwork in cockpit. Jimmy Murakami, Shay Corcoran, Lynn Garrison
