= Stewart Moskowitz =

American cartoonist

- Born: July 6, 1941
- Died: May 23, 2017 (aged 75); Redway, California, US
- Occupations: Illustrator; Author

Stewart Moskowitz (born July 6, 1941 – May 23, 2017) was an American artist, illustrator, and children's book author. His pop art style paintings gained popularity in the United States during the 1970s and early 1980s through the sale of posters and prints.

== Early career ==
Mozkowitz's first success in mass-produced prints was "American Rabbit". Later successes included "Penguins...the Corporation", "The White Brothers", "Chocolate Mousse", "Patchwork Cow", and "Chicken Soup". His characters and artistic style became especially popular in Japan in the early 1980s. Moskowitz published several children's books of his own in 1982. By 1986, several of the characters in Moskowitz's paintings were used in the movie The Adventures of the American Rabbit. His work remained strongly popular in Japan and formed the basis of logos and commercial illustrations for several Japanese companies (including AT&T Japan, Fuji, Mitsubishi & Panasonic), children's books, and animated movies in that country.

Fuji TV used one of Moskowitz's paintings, which depicts the planet Earth as a fish, as the Naruhodo! The World logo during the series broadcast run. Parasa & Dinky Dinos became a Japanese franchise including a coloring cartridge for the Konami Picno; at least one animated short; and Parasa (a yellow parasaurolophus) was instated as the mascot of newly renamed Sakura Bank in 1992, appearing on bank cards, pass books, and other materials.

Moskowitz registered several dozen paintings under United States' copyright in the late 20th and early 21st centuries.

== Death ==
By mid-May, 2017, Moskowitz had been diagnosed with terminal cancer and was in hospice care. A YouCaring (now part of GoFundMe) fundraiser raised over $10,000 to bring his family together, given his condition. Moskowitz's death came shortly after, on May 23, 2017.

== Artistic works ==
=== Paintings (1970s) ===
- American Rabbit
- Peeky-Turcock
- The White Brothers
- Penguins...the Corporation
- Loose Appaloosas
- Star Rabbit
- Patchwork Cow
- Giant Pig/Pig With House
- Unfettered Love

=== Bibliography ===
==== As author ====
Year	Title	Publisher	ISBN	Pages	Note
1982	A Patchwork Fish Tale	Julian Messner	978-0671453275	28	
1982	The Legend of the American Rabbit...Who He Is and How He Came To Be	Julian Messner	978-0671458850	30	
1982	Too-Loose the Chocolate Moose	Julian Messner	978-0671458867	28	
1984	Fred & Freddy's Lovely Cooking (Desserts)	AIPEC	978-4870470101	63	Japanese
1984	Fred & Freddy's Lovely Cooking (American Snacks)	AIPEC	978-4870470118	63	Japanese
1984	Fred & Freddy's Lovely Cooking (Dinners)	AIPEC	978-4870470156	63	Japanese
1984	Fred & Freddy's Lovely Cooking (Lunches)	AIPEC	978-4870470163	63	Japanese
1990	Moskowitz's World	Fusosha Publishing	978-4594006143		Japanese
1993	Yellow Dinosaur Boy: Adventure of Parasa and Friends	Fusosha Publishing	978-4594011420		Japanese
1996	Yellow Dinosaur Boy 2: Save Our Dinosaur Planet	Fusosha Publishing	978-4594019679		Japanese
2012	Too-Loose the Chocolate Moose, 30th Anniversary Edition	Stewart Moskowitz Media	978-0985146719	32	
2013	Vincent van Goat: The Real Story	Stewart Moskowitz Media	978-0985146726	34	
2013	A Patchwork Fish Tale: 30th Anniversary Edition	Stewart Moskowitz Media	978-0985146733	34	

==== As illustrator ====
Year	Title (author)	Publisher	ISBN	Pages	Note
1994	Night of the Upside-Down Crescent Moon (Yuichi Watanabe)	Fusosha Publishing	978-4594015817		Japanese
1997	The Flying Coconut (unknown)				Japanese
2015	Barney Meets BeeBee (Noni Morton)	Jangus Publishing Group	978-0996463706	23	
2015	Bear's Pond (Noni Morton)	Jangus Publishing Group	978-0996463713	23	
