= Streets (film) =

1990 American thriller/drama film

- Theatrical release poster
- Directed by: Katt Shea
- Written by: Andy Ruben; Katt Shea
- Produced by: Andy Ruben executive Roger Corman
- Starring: Christina Applegate; David Mendenhall; Eb Lottimer
- Cinematography: Phedon Papamichael
- Edited by: Gina Mittelman
- Music by: Aaron Davis
- Production company: Concorde Pictures
- Distributed by: Concorde Pictures
- Release date: January 19, 1990
- Running time: 85 minutes
- Country: United States
- Language: English
- Box office: $1,510,053 (US)

Streets is a 1990 American thriller/drama film directed by Katt Shea and starring Christina Applegate and David Mendenhall.

== Plot ==
Dawn, a drug-addicted teen prostitute living on the streets of Los Angeles, and Sy, a teenage boy with dreams of becoming a rock star, become friends after Sy rescues Dawn from a violent john. Dawn takes Sy under her wing and gives him a guided tour of the seedy underworld of Hollywood.

== Cast ==
- Christina Applegate as Dawn
- David Mendenhall as Sy
- Eb Lottimer as Lumley
- Jane Chung as Old Bag Woman
- Starr Andreeff as Policewoman on Horse
- Alexander Folk as Bagley
- Kay Lenz as Sargent
- J Bartell as Officer #1 (as J. Bartell)
- Paul Ben-Victor as Officer #2
- Tom Ruben as Officer #3
- David Lawrence as Plumber
- Patrick Richwood as Bob
- Aron Eisenberg as Roach

== Production ==
Katt Shea later recalled:

That was me just exploring the underside…I tend to really like to explore people I don’t know and so I started doing research on the streets and talking to people who lived on the streets. I did a lot of research and they thought I was a homeless person and I hung out with the kids and stuff and then wrote from that research. I knew a girl who was a heroin addict that we based "Dawn" on her. She lived on the street or sometimes she lived with a very rich boyfriend, which was very very strange.

Streets led to Shea being offered to direct the film Poison Ivy.

== Reception ==
Variety wrote, "Despite its B-film framework involving a maniacal killer stalking street kids, Streets transcends its genre with a gritty and affecting portrait of a teenage throwaway."

== Home media ==
Streets was released on VHS in mid 1990s through MGM/UA Home Entertainment. A double feature DVD edition was released in 2011 as part of the Roger Corman's Cult Classics collection, through Shout! Factory.
