= The Little Rascals Christmas Special =

U.S. animated television Christmas special

- Genre: Christmas; Comedy
- Based on: Our Gang
- Written by: Romeo Muller
- Directed by: Charles Swenson; Fred Wolf
- Starring: Philip Tanzini; Jim Gatherun; Randi Kiger; Al Jocko Fann; Robby Kiger; Darla Hood Granson; Stymie Beard
- Theme music composer: Greig McRitchie
- Country of origin: United States
- Original language: English

Production
- Producers: Romeo Muller; Fred Wolf
- Editor: Rich Harrison
- Running time: 24 minutes
- Production companies: King World Productions; Muller-Rosen Productions; Murakami Wolf Swenson

Original release
- Network: NBC
- Release: December 3, 1979

The Little Rascals' Christmas Special is an American animated Christmas television special based on the Our Gang comedies of the 1920s-40s. The special was produced by King World Productions, and first aired December 3, 1979 on NBC. It is a spoof of the 1905 O. Henry short story The Gift of the Magi.

== Plot ==
Spanky (Philip Tanzini) and Porky (Robby Kiger)'s mother (Darla Hood) is a single mother during the Depression. Money is tight with very little left over to buy anything nice. When the boys overhear Mom talking on the phone about a blue comet, they think she is ordering for them a Blue Comet train set for the holidays. However, Mom was talking about a vacuum cleaner brand instead. Unable to break the truth to her sons, she exchanges a coat she had ordered for the train. When she gets sick and the boys realize why she has no coat, they enlist the help of the gang to raise the money to get the coat back. But every plan to raise money fails, mainly because of the kids' ineptitude. Then two neighborhood bullies steal the train set. But it turns out a grouchy Salvation Army Santa (Jack Somack) had been following the kids' plight for some time, and in the end he buys a new coat for Spanky and Porky's mother, and makes the bullies return the train set.

== Cast ==
- Philip Tanzini - Spanky
- Jimmy Gatherum – Alfalfa
- Randi Kiger – Darla
- Al Jocko Fann – Stymie
- Robby Kiger – Porky
- Jack Somack – Santa
- Darla Hood – Mom
- Stymie Beard – Mr. Klugger (The Butcher)
- Cliff Norton – Angry Man
- Frank Nelson – Sales Clerk
- Melville A. Levin – Delivery Man
- Hal Smith – Uncle Hominy (Alfalfa's Uncle)
- Naomi Lewis – Sales Lady
- Ike Eisenmann – Bully

== Notes ==
- While initially airing on NBC, the special later went into television syndication, most recently airing in December 2009, on ABC Family, which later became Freeform and on MeTV Toons on November 29, 2025.
- The Little Rascals mention that their club, the Reindeer Club, was originally the Woodchucks Club. This is a nod to the Our Gang short Anniversary Trouble.
- Two of the original Our Gang cast members, Darla Hood and Matthew "Stymie" Beard, provide voices. Hood portrays the mother of Spanky and Porky, while Beard plays the neighborhood butcher.
- Darla Hood's final role. She died nearly six months before this special aired.
- Following the release of this special, the animated cels were reused for 156 thirty second Public Service Announcements, featuring the Little Rascals. The principal voice actors reprised their roles for these commercials.
