= .45 (film) =

2006 independent thriller film by Gary Lennon

- Official U.S. film poster
- Directed by: Gary Lennon
- Written by: Gary Lennon
- Produced by: David Bergstein
- Starring: Milla Jovovich; Angus Macfadyen; Stephen Dorff; Aisha Tyler; Sarah Strange; Vincent Laresca; Dawn Greenhalgh; Nola Augustson
- Cinematography: Teodoro Maniaci
- Edited by: William M. Anderson; Richard Nord
- Music by: Timothy Fitzpatrick; John Robert Wood
- Distributed by: Mobius Entertainment
- Release dates: November 30, 2006 (Greece); April 27, 2007 (U.S.)
- Running time: 101 minutes
- Country: United States
- Language: English

.45 is a 2006 American independent thriller film written and directed by Gary Lennon and starring Milla Jovovich, Angus Macfadyen, Aisha Tyler, Stephen Dorff, and Sarah Strange. .45 was released theatrically in Greece, Taiwan, Singapore, Japan, South Korea, and Mexico.

== Plot ==
Big Al (Angus Macfadyen), and his girlfriend Kat (Milla Jovovich), are small-time crooks dealing in guns and stolen goods in Queens, New York City while also cleverly avoiding the NYPD and ATF. Vic (Sarah Strange), is Kat's friend and ex-lover who still has a crush on her and hates Big Al.

Big Al is almost arrested in a police sting, but is released when they realize he is unarmed...as Kat was holding the guns. Returning home, they catch a thief trying to take their TV out the window, and Big Al beats him up. They call the police and berate them for not catching the 'real crooks', while surrounded by the stolen goods that are their livelihood. Meeting up with his old partner, Reilly (Stephen Dorff), they steal a car as Al tries to convince him to come back and help run the gun business.

However, Kat has plans of her own; she wants to sell guns on her own in order to move to a better neighborhood. She meets up with Jose (Vincent Laresca), a drug dealer and Big Al's rival, and sells him a gun. However, Clancy (Tony Munch), a local snitch working for Al, notices them. Kat returns home and pretends to have been out with Vic, upsetting Al.

When Jose brazenly comes on to Kat, Al, Clancy, and their friends punish him by appearing to cut off his fingers. Al comes home later, and based on comments from Clancy, accuses Kat of having sex with Jose and assaults her. The next day, Vic and Reilly come over to console her but Al arrives home and a fight leads to Al firing his gun, injuring Kat. Al is arrested and detained.

At the police precinct, Kat is questioned by Liz (Aisha Tyler), a member of a battered women's group that offers protection via sanctuary or court order. Liz explains that Al doesn't really love her, and she used to be in an abusive marriage of her own. Kat refuses to press charges but decides to leave him.

Big Al sneaks in through the window as she is packing, threatens her with death if she ever leaves. When Liz and Vic arrive to take her, he convinces Kat to tell them she wants to stay.

Kat devises a plan to seduce Vic, Reilly, Jose and Liz, and telling each of them she'll do anything to be rid of Big Al. After convincing Al to stay home one evening, a hooded figure takes Big Al's jacket with his name on it, his registered .45 handgun, and shoots Clancy. The next day, Big Al goes into a church and threatens the priest. As he leaves the church he is arrested for Clancy's murder. Kat, Vic, and Reilly watch from across the street.

Later Al begs Kat to find the real killer, knowing he has been set up, but can't figure out who did it. Kat reveals that she is behind the plot, and is now in charge. Later, Reilly and Vic discuss who the killer is, and then realize they both fear the hard change in Kat, and decide to start a relationship together.

Kat meets up with the real killer: it was Liz. Kissing, Liz says now they can be together but Kat explains she only used her and leaves Liz heartbroken. Kat picks up the gun business and the film ends with her living by the beach.

== Cast ==
- Milla Jovovich as Kat
- Angus Macfadyen as Big Al
- Stephen Dorff as Reilly
- Aisha Tyler as Liz
- Sarah Strange as Vic
- Vincent Laresca as Jose
- Tony Munch as Clancy
- Kay Hawtrey as Marge
- Hardee T. Lineham as Father Duffel
- Dawn Greenhalgh as Fran
- Nola Augustson as Gertie
- John Gordon as Danny

== Production ==
Principal filming was done in Toronto, Ontario, Canada, in 2005.

== Reception ==
Variety describes the film as a "doublecross pic set in the underworld of Hell's Kitchen."
