= Charles Swenson =

American animation artist

- Born: Charles Gregory Swenson; March 28, 1941 (age 85); Los Angeles, California, U.S.
- Occupations: producer, director, animator, writer, painter
- Known for: Teenage Mutant Ninja Turtles; Puff the Magic Dragon; An American Tail: Fievel Goes West; Rugrats; Mike, Lu & Og

Charles Gregory Swenson (born March 28, 1941) is an American animator, writer, storyboard artist, sound designer, producer and director who worked with animated film for many years. He wrote, directed, and animated the 1974 unrated adult-themed feature Dirty Duck. In 1978, he joined Murakami Wolf Swenson. He is also the creator of Cartoon Network's Mike, Lu & Og in which he also wrote the scripts for several episodes as well serving as executive producer and voice director. He left the entertainment industry in the early 2000s to become a painter.

== Filmography ==
=== Feature films ===
Year	Title	Director	Writer	Other	Credit	Notes
1971	The Point!	No	No	Yes	Additional animator	Made for television
1971	200 Motels	No	No	Yes	Animation director	Segment: "Dental Hygiene Dilemma"
1973	The Naked Ape	No	No	Yes	Director of animation	
1974	Down and Dirty Duck	Yes	Yes	No		
1977	The Mouse and His Child	Yes	No	No		Co-directing with Fred Wolf
1982	Flush	No	Story	No		
1983	Twice Upon a Time	Yes	Yes	No		Co-directing with John Korty
1984	Johnny Dangerously	No	No	Yes	Graphics: SCRUFFY	
1986	The Blinkins: The Bear and the Blizzard	No	Yes	Yes	Producer	Made for television
1991	An American Tail: Fievel Goes West	No	Story	No		
1991	The Indian Runner	No	No	Yes	Sketch artist: winter unit	
1995	The Crossing Guard	No	No	Yes	Sketch artist	
1998	Hurlyburly	No	No	Yes	Storyboard artist	

=== Shorts ===
Year	Title	Director	Producer	Writer	Other	Credit	Notes
1967	George... the People	No	No	No	Yes	Animator	
1968	The Magic Pear Tree	Yes	No	Story	Yes	Animator	
1976	Sooper Goop	Yes	No	No	Yes	Animator	
1978	Puff the Magic Dragon	Yes	No	No	Yes	Animator	Made for television; co-directing with Fred Wolf
1979	Puff the Magic Dragon in the Land of the Living Lies	Yes	Yes	No	No		Made for television; co-directing with Fred Wolf
1979	The Little Rascals' Christmas Special	Yes	No	No	No		Made for television; co-directing with Fred Wolf
1980	The World of Strawberry Shortcake	Yes	Yes	No	No		Made for television
1980	Carlton Your Doorman	Yes	No	No	No		Made for television; co-directing with Fred Wolf
1980	Thanksgiving in the Land of Oz	Yes	Yes	No	No		Made for television; co-directing with Fred Wolf
1994	Edith Ann: Homeless Go Home	No	No	No	Yes	Voice direction consultant	Made for television
2002	The Bugs	No	Yes	Yes	No		Rus: Букашки
2019	Bird in a Window	No	No	No	Yes	Sound	

=== TV series ===
Year	Title	Producer	Writer	Other	Credit	Notes
1991-1994	Rugrats	Creative	No	Yes	Director (episode 'The Santa Experience'); creative consultant (13 episodes); storyboard artist (episode 'Meet the Carmichaels/The Box')	52 episodes
1994-1997	Aaahh!!! Real Monsters	Creative	No	No		52 episodes
1995	Santo Bugito	Creative	No	No		Episode 'My Name Is Revenge'
1998	What a Cartoon!	Executive	Yes	No		Episode 'Crash Lancelot'
1999-2001	Mike, Lu & Og	Executive	Yes	Yes	Creator (27 episodes); voice director (2 episodes)	Writer (20 episodes); executive producer (27 episodes)

=== Video game ===
Year	Title	Credit	Notes
1987	Freedom Fighter	Director of Animation	Laserdisc arcade game, animation completed in 1984 but game not released until 1987.
