= The Mouse and His Child (film) =

1977 American–Japanese animated film

- Theatrical release poster
- Directed by: Charles Swenson; Fred Wolf
- Written by: Russell Hoban (novel); Carol Monpere
- Produced by: Walt deFaria
- Starring: Peter Ustinov; Cloris Leachman; Sally Kellerman; Andy Devine
- Music by: Roger Kellaway
- Production companies: Murakami-Wolf Productions; Sanrio; DeFaria-Lockhart
- Distributed by: Sanrio
- Release dates: November 18, 1977 (U.S.); March 18, 1978 (Japan); December 18, 1980 (Australia)
- Running time: 83 minutes
- Countries: United States; Japan
- Language: English
- Budget: $1.6 million

The Mouse and His Child is a 1977 animated film based on the 1967 novel of the same name by Russell Hoban.

== Plot ==
The mouse and his child are two parts of a single small wind-up toy, which must be wound by a key in the father's back. After being unpacked, they discover themselves in a toy shop where they befriend a toy elephant and toy seal. The child mouse proposes staying at the shop to form a family, which the other toys ridicule.

They accidentally fall off the counter and end up in the trash. Once transported to the dump, they become enslaved by Manny the rat, who runs a casino and uses broken wind-up toys as his slave labor force. With the aid of a psychic frog, the mice escape and meet other animals on a quest to become free and independent self-winding toys.

They rediscover the elephant and seal, who are somewhat broken down. Together they manage to form a family and destroy the rat empire.

== Cast ==
Character	English	Japanese
Manny the Rat	Peter Ustinov	Ichirō Zaitsu
The Elephant	Joan Gerber	Masumi Harukawa
The Seal	Sally Kellerman	Shinobu Ōtake
The Frog	Andy Devine	Kinba Sanyūtei
The Crows	Frank Nelson	Gorō Naya
The Crows	Cliff Norton	Gorō Naya
The Clock	Regis Cordic	Joji Yanami
Euterpe	Cloris Leachman	Yukiji Asaoka
Iggy	Neville Brand	Osamu Katō
Muskrat	Bob Holt	Kazuo Kumakura
Jack in the Box	Robert Ridgely	Ichirō Nagai
Teller	Maitzi Morgan	Keiko Han
Starlings	Maitzi Morgan	Yumi Nakatani
Starlings	Iris Rainer	Chiyoko Kawashima
Paper People	Iris Rainer	Fuyumi Shiraishi
Paper People	Charles Woolf	Makio Inoue
Bluejay	Charles Woolf	Kaneta Kimotsuki
The Mouse	Alan Barzman	Hiroshi Sakamoto
The Mouse Child	Marcy Swenson	Atsuko Sakamoto
Ralphie	Mel Leven	Shunji Fujimura

=== Additional English voices ===
- John Carradine (The Tramp)
- Cliff Osmond (Serpentina)

== Home media ==
The film was first released on RCA/Columbia Pictures Home Video on VHS in 1983 and re-released in 1985 in the United States. A DVD version has yet to be released in the United States, but it was released on DVD in Japan.

== Reception ==
Janet Maslin of The New York Times praised the direction, writing and music score, but criticized the darker elements and stated that "83 minutes is a long time for an adult to think about mice".

Leonard Maltin's Movie Guide rated the movie BOMB (his lowest rating) out of four stars. He says "Boring animated film. Talk, talk, talk, and no action."

== See also ==
- Children's literature
- 1977 in film
