= Down and Dirty Duck =

1974 film by Charles Swenson

- Theatrical release poster
- Directed by: Charles Swenson
- Written by: Charles Swenson
- Produced by: Jerry D. Good; Uncredited: Roger Corman
- Starring: Howard Kaylan; Mark Volman
- Music by: Flo & Eddie
- Production company: Murakami-Wolf
- Distributed by: New World Pictures
- Release date: July 8, 1974
- Running time: 75 minutes
- Country: United States
- Language: English
- Budget: $110,000

Down and Dirty Duck, first shown under the abbreviated titles Cheap! and Dirty Duck, is a 1974 American adult animated comedy film written and directed by Charles Swenson and starring Mark Volman and Howard Kaylan (Flo & Eddie) as the voices of a strait-laced, low-level white-collar worker named Willard and an unnamed duck, among other characters. The plot consists of a series of often abstract sequences, including plot material created by stars Kaylan, Volman, Robert Ridgely, and, according to the film's ending credits, various people Swenson encountered during the making of the film. The film received mostly negative reviews and became relegated to late shows.

== Plot ==
Willard Isenbaum, a lonely insurance man with wild sexual fantasies, decides to propose to the new secretary, Susie, whom he has only known for a day and to whom he has never spoken. He spends the entire morning before work fantasizing about having sex with her, but his attempts to approach her fail. His female boss sends him to investigate a claim filed by Painless Martha, an aging tattoo artist, who works in the city. Martha believes in a Ouija board message saying that she will be "killed by a bomb delivered by a wizard on Tuesday".

When Willard tells her that the insurance company will not pay until her death, she dies of a heart attack [after an explosion noise]. Her will stipulates that her killer must take care of her duck. After the duo spend a night in jail, the duck takes Willard to a brothel. After a wild night of partying, they wind up in the desert, where the duck dresses Willard in women's clothing in an attempt to get a ride. After several encounters with an old prospector dying of thirst, a racist police officer, a lesbian couple, and a short Mexican "bandito", they are finally picked up by a trucker.

Back at his apartment, Willard creates a makeshift sex object, which the duck eats. Shortly after, Willard discovers that the duck is female, and has sex with her. The following morning, Willard and the duck go to Willard's job, where Willard has sex with his female boss and quits his job shortly after. Willard and the duck leave, and the movie ends with Willard saying that the duck was a good duck after all.

== Cast ==
- Howard Kaylan - Willard Isenbaum / Negro Lady / Side Hack Rider
- Mark Volman - Duck / Side Hack Rider
- Robert Ridgely - Car Salesman / Man at Bus Stop / Negro Gentleman / Big Fag / Police Officer / Tank
- Walker Edmiston - Bus Driver / Jail Orator / Small Fag / Prospector / Mexican Official / President / Man in Elevator
- Lurene Tuttle - Duck's Mother
- Aynsley Dunbar - Additional Voices
- Cynthia Adler - Lady In Car / Boss Lady / Small Dyke / Lady In Elevator
- Joëlle Le Quément - Land Lady / Lady at Bus Stop / Madam / Big Dyke
- Jerry D. Good - Transvestite

== Production ==
After the release and success of Fritz the Cat, several animated films meant for adults rather than children enjoyed success. Fritz, a film based on a character created by artist and illustrator Robert Crumb, was the first animated movie to receive an X rating in the United States. Charles Swenson developed Down and Dirty Duck as a project for former Turtles and Mothers of Invention band members Kaylan and Volman under the title Cheap!

Producer Jerry D. Good pitched the film to Howard Kaylan and Mark Volman while the production company, Murakami-Wolf, prepared the animated sequence for Frank Zappa's 200 Motels. Kaylan and Volman met with director Charles Swenson on June 7, 1973; Swenson had written the screenplay for Kaylan and Volman under the title Cheap!

The film's production budget was $110,000. According to Swenson, he created almost all of the animation himself, although publicity attributed the animation work to the Murakami-Wolf Production Company, with Academy Award-winning animator Fred Wolf, credited as his son's name, Bill Wolf, helped animate parts of the film personally.

Kaylan and Volman recorded the music at Cherokee Studios with The Robbs serving as their backing band, credited as Flo & Eddie.

During production, Roger Corman observed the title, Cheap! as a shot at his production techniques, and asked that the title be changed; film director Mick Garris suggested that Corman did not want to release a film titled Roger Corman's Cheap!, though Corman was not credited as producer on the film.

Although the film was promoted as an X-rated animated film, New World Pictures had not actually submitted it to the Motion Picture Association of America (MPAA).

The film was officially promoted as Dirty Duck, although the title on the film itself reads Down and Dirty Duck.

Despite the use of the title Dirty Duck, the film has nothing to do with the Dirty Duck character created by Bobby London and published in National Lampoon and Playboy magazines.

== Release and reception ==
Dirty Duck premiered in Los Angeles on July 8, 1974. The distributor did not promote it heavily, and most reviewers disliked it. Because the film was X-rated, The New York Times refused to run the film's advertisement. This was a somewhat awkward situation, as the ad included a positive review from The New York Times. According to Swenson, "it didn't have a big following, ... but it is still in video stores." The film played for about two weeks in New York City. Jerry Beck wrote a review in which he called the film "raunchier than Ralph Bakshi's films." He went on to say that the humor of the film "is good, but the design and drawing is downright awful. It seems to be sort of a cross between Jules Feiffer and Gahan Wilson, if that can be imagined." Beck also stated that the film was "very similar to R. Crumb's Mr. Natural and Flakey Foont. There is no reason that the duck should be a duck. Every character in the film is human, and he just seems to be a duck just to give the film a catchy title. There are some highly imaginative animated ideas here, but the film's entertainment value is at a minimum." Beck later called the film "one of the most overlooked animated features of the 1970s, a glorious experimental mess of a film, which, from today's vantage point, looks incredibly creative and daring, and something current Hollywood studios would never attempt."

Playboy noted that the advertisements for the film said, "this film has no socially redeeming value" and continued "well, that's dead right, yet this movie has some value as a promising X-rated cartoon in the tradition of Ralph Bakshi's Fritz the Cat. The New York Times called it a "zany, lively, uninhibited, sexual odyssey that manages to mix a bit of Walter Mitty and a touch of Woody Allen with some of the innocence of Walt Disney [and the] urban smarts of Ralph Bakshi". Charles Solomon of the Los Angeles Times gave the film an extremely negative review, calling "a sprawling undisciplined piece of sniggering vulgarity that resembles nothing so much as animated bathroom graffiti. [The film is] degrading to women, blacks, Chicanos, gays, cops, lesbians, and anyone with an IQ of more than 45". Variety commented that the film "has little to recommend."

== See also ==
- List of American films of 1974
