= Alison Larkin =

American novelist

- Born: April 28, 1963 (age 63)
- Occupations: Comedian; writer; audiobook narrator; founder of Alison Larkin Presents
- Years active: 1989–present

Alison Larkin (born April 28, 1963) is an English American comedian, novelist, actress, and audiobook narrator. Her novel The English American sprang from her autobiographical one-woman comedy show about an adopted English woman who finds her birth parents in the United States. The show previewed at the Manchester Royal Exchange and the Edinburgh Assembly Rooms in 2000, and received its London premiere as part of the London Comedy Festival at the Soho Theatre in London in 2004. The Times reviewed it as "marvelously light footed, hugely entertaining reflections… a lesson in the human condition."

== Career ==
Larkin trained as a classical actress at the Webber Douglas Academy of Dramatic Art in London. After playing Daisy in Daisy Pulls It Off at the Thorndike Theatre, Leatherhead, and originating the role of Flora Poste in Cold Comfort Farm at the Watermill Theatre, Newbury, in 1990, she moved to New York City and began a new career as a stand-up comic, appearing regularly at Comic Strip Live in New York and The Comedy Store in LA. She also appeared on Broadway in the Royal National Theater's production of Stanley (play) and Off-Broadway at the Manhattan Theatre Club where she understudied Harriet Walter in Three Birds Alighting on a Field and Allison Janney in New England. Her many voice-over roles include Pauline in Pauline’s Perilous Pyramid for Square One Television (1992), The Good Witch of The North and the China Princess in The Firesign Theatre’s The Wonderful World of Oz (2000) and Hermione in the Cartoon Network’s Mike, Lu & Og.

=== Writing ===
Larkin's autobiographical novel The English American about an adopted English woman who finds her birth mother in the United States was published by Simon & Schuster in 2008 and became a bestseller. Larkin narrated the audiobook which won an AudioFile (magazine) Earphones award in 2012.

=== Audiobooks ===
Larkin has recorded over 200 audiobooks including The Complete Novels of Jane Austen, the Swallows and Amazons series by Arthur Ransome and the Agatha Raisin series by M.C. Beaton. She has won multiple awards for her audiobook narrations including AudioFile Earphones Awards for Peter Pan and the Inconsiderate Waiter, Sense and Sensibility, and Dracula & Carmilla. In 2016 she founded her own audiobook production company, Alison Larkin Presents, which offers fresh reads on classic English novels, contemporary mysteries, women's fiction, nonfiction, and more.

== See also ==
- Mike, Lu & Og as Hermione Cuzzlewit (Series Regular), Cartoon Network
