= Puff the Magic Dragon in the Land of the Living Lies =

1979 animated TV special

- Genre: Animation; Fantasy; Family; Short
- Written by: Romeo Muller
- Directed by: Charles Swenson; Fred Wolf
- Starring: Burgess Meredith; Peter Yarrow; Robert Ridgely; Joan Gerber; Ike Eisenmann
- Theme music composer: Peter Yarrow; David Richard Cambell
- Country of origin: United States
- Original language: English

Production
- Executive producers: Kevin Hunter; Robert L. Rosen
- Producers: Charles Swenson; Peter Yarrow; Romeo Muller; Fred Wolf
- Editor: Rich Harrison
- Running time: 24 minutes
- Production companies: Murakami Wolf Swenson; Yarrow/Muller-My Company

Original release
- Network: CBS
- Release: November 17, 1979

Puff the Magic Dragon in the Land of the Living Lies (or simply Puff in the Land of the Living Lies) is a 24-minute animated television special that first aired November 17, 1979 on CBS. A sequel to the 1978 TV special Puff the Magic Dragon, with Burgess Meredith returning as the voice of the title character, the special was produced by Fred Wolf Films.

The sequel Puff and the Incredible Mr. Nobody aired in 1982.

== Plot ==
The film begins with Puff acting out the lies of a girl named Sandy, who has developed a persistent habit of making up absurd lies on most occasions, and shows how this has alienated most of her friends and leaving only her dog as a companion. Puff moves to intervene when she causes a household accident and falsely blames her innocent dog who is sent away as punishment.

The dragon meets Sandy and forcibly takes her to the Land of Living Lies, leaving her claiming that she preferred to be there anyway because her house is "broken". Once there, she encounters famous liars like The Boy who Cried Wolf, and Baron Munchausen and various representations of metaphors of imagination. Along the way, Puff explains to Sandy the difference between purposefully deceptive lies and the harmless description of figments of imagination.

Unfortunately, the impossibility of living in such a world where nothing expressed can be believed is reinforced when Sandy is presented with strange laws about no eating the flowers or picking the apples; which are not around. She is then maneuvered by two talking rocks that each claim to be a flower and an apple, only for them to accuse her for breaking the laws, leading her to being arrested by Pinocchio. She is then subjected to a bizarre trial in the Caverns in the Living Lies by the denizens of the land, where she panics and falsely blames Puff for her crime.

Afterward, she visits him as he sits chained, pleading for him to use his magic to send them back to the real world. Puff tells her that would be impossible unless she tells the truth, which causes the natives to growl in pain. Regardless of the situation, Sandy confesses that she cannot truly go home, but cannot bring herself to explain how her home is truly "broken". At Puff's urging, she confesses that she makes up her lies because she does not want to live with her perceived truth that she considers herself responsible for her parents' divorce. At that statement, the natives chortle with delight at what Puff explains is a self-deceptive lie and makes her realize that she had nothing to do with her parents' break-up and they still love her.

At this liberating truth, Puff and Sandy are freed, bring the walls of the cavern down with their celebratory song and return to the real world. At that, Puff prepares to leave, but not before suggesting to Sandy that she can see him again in spirit by using her vibrant imagination in more constructive ways like writing fiction. Sandy immediately takes that advice after reconciling with her parents while exonerating her dog and begins her first story, which Puff confidently notes is sure to be a classic.

== Voice cast ==
- Burgess Meredith as Puff
- Mischa Bond as Sandy
- Peter Yarrow as Father
- Joan Gerber as Mother/Pinocchio/Rock #2/Little Girl
- Alan Barzman as Rock #1
- Robert Ridgely as Baron Munchausen/Snake/Cowboy/Attorney
- Ike Eisenmann as The Boy Who Cried Wolf/Umpire
- Gene Moss as Old Fisherman/Judge/Bailiff
