= The Box (1967 film) =

- Directed by: Fred Wolf
- Produced by: Fred Wolf
- Edited by: Rich Harrison
- Music by: Shelly Manne
- Production company: Murakami-Wolf Productions
- Distributed by: Brandon Films
- Release date: 1967
- Running time: 9 minutes
- Country: United States
- Language: English

The Box is a 1967 American independent animated short film directed by Fred Wolf about an old man with a mysterious box. The film is a dialogue-less cartoon with a minimalist soundtrack by jazz drummer Shelly Manne.

== Summary ==
On a rainy night, a short, old man in a raincoat walks into a bar, placing a small black box on the counter next to him.

Another man, dressed in a business suit, walks into the bar. He expresses interest in the box, using hand motions to guess the box's contents and offering to give the old man money. The old man initially refuses, but he eventually opens the box to allow the businessman a peek. The businessman finds the contents disturbing and runs out of the bar.

Later, a woman in a dress arrives at the bar who, like the businessman, wants to see inside the box. She flirts with the old man, who eventually opens it for her. When she cannot see the contents, the old man encourages her to reach a hand in. When she pulls out her hand, it is wet, and she angrily storms out of the bar.

After getting another drink, the old man pulls out a bag of food pellets, empties it on the bar top, and opens the box. A small creature runs out, grabs the food, and runs back in.

After the box is closed, a young woman in a raincoat walks into the bar. The old man immediately takes a liking to her and shows her the box, though he asks her not to open it and instead buys her a drink. After she finishes, she reaches into her raincoat, revealing a box much like the old man's. She also takes out a bag of food pellets, which are eaten by a small creature similar to the one in the old man's box.

The two open their boxes side-by-side, expecting the animals to run out and meet each other. When the animals stay inside the boxes, the couple push the boxes together, which start shaking. The old man and young woman reach over to view the animals, then smile at each other and kiss. Keeping the boxes together, they walk into the rain, hand-in-hand, onto Noah's Ark.

== Accolades ==
The film won the Academy Award for Best Animated Short Film at the 40th Academy Awards.

== Preservation ==
The Box was preserved by the Academy Film Archive in 2003.

== See also ==
- 1967 in film
- Limited animation
