= The Magic Pear Tree =

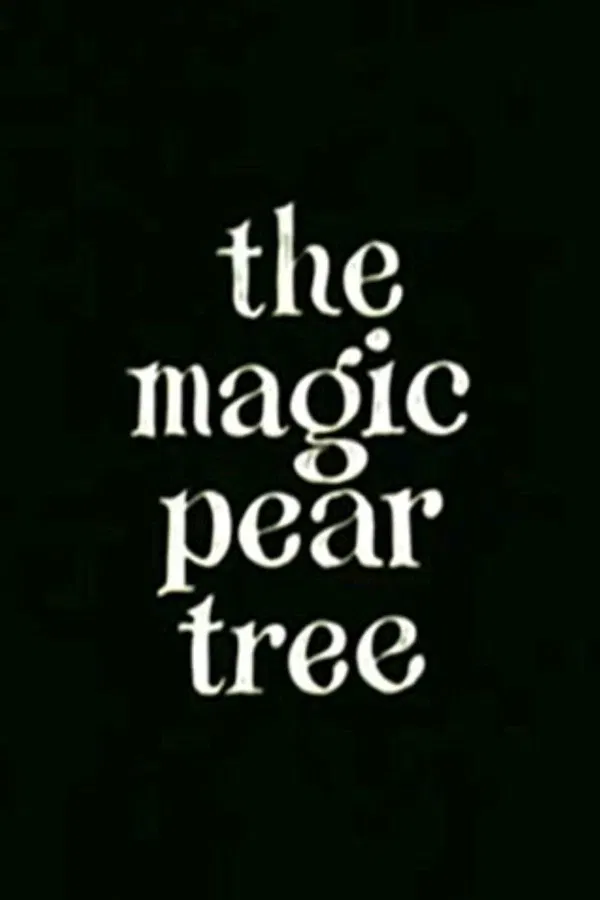
- Directed by: Charles Swenson
- Produced by: Jimmy T. Murakami
- Starring: Paul Frees, Agnes Moorehead, Keenan Wynn
- Music by: Laurindo Almeida
- Release date: 1968
- Running time: 10 minutes
- Country: United States
- Language: English

The Magic Pear Tree is a 1968 American animated short film directed and co-written by Charles Swenson. The ten-minute film features the voices of Paul Frees, Agnes Moorehead, and Keenan Wynn. It was produced by Jimmy T. Murakami and features music composed by Laurindo Almeida. The story is a comical tale about a romantic rivalry set around a "magical" pear tree.

== Plot ==
Jean Navarro, visits the estate of a wealthy marquis and his new wife, Chantelle. Using a pear tree, he convinces the marquis that the tree can reveal secrets, tricking him into believing that Jean and Chantelle are not having an affair. The short ends with the trickster’s plan succeeding.

== Voice cast ==
- Paul Frees as Jean Navarro
- Agnes Moorehead as Chantelle
- Keenan Wynn as Marquis

== Production ==
The short was produced by Jimmy T. Murakami, with direction and co-writing by Charles Swenson. Laurindo Almeida composed the music.

== Reception ==
The film was noted for its adult-oriented humor and good use of voice acting. The film was also nominated for an Oscar in 1969.
