= Fred Wolf (animator) =

American animator

- Born: Fredrick Wolf
- Occupations: Animator, designer, artist, Director
- Known for: Founder of Fred Wolf Films Dublin
- Children: Bill Wolf, Elizabeth Wolf, Patricia Wolf

Fred Wolf is an American animator and director. His works include the 1967 short subject The Box, for which he won an Academy Award; television specials such as The Point! and Free to Be...You and Me, and television series such as Teenage Mutant Ninja Turtles, James Bond Jr., and Sarah Ferguson’s Budgie the Little Helicopter. Wolf was also responsible for the famous Tootsie Pops “How Many Licks” commercial.

In the 1960s, Wolf set up a studio in Hollywood, California with Japanese-American animator Jimmy T. Murakami (later of The Snowman). The studio was called Murakami-Wolf Films. In 1978, animator Charles Swenson became a partner, and the company became known as Murakami-Wolf-Swenson. Both Murakami and Swenson eventually left the company, and in 1992, it became Fred Wolf Films.

In 1989, MWS established a satellite studio in Dublin, Ireland, known as Murakami-Wolf Dublin before eventually adopting its current name (Fred Wolf Films Dublin). In this studio, each project is produced by a dedicated Irish crew.

== Productions ==
Among the various series produced by or involving Fred Wolf:

- Alvin and the Chipmunks (1988, 11 episodes on NBC)
- Barnyard Commandos (1990, 13 episodes in syndication)
- The California Raisin Show (1989, 13 episodes on CBS)
- DuckTales (1987–1988, 30 episodes in syndication)
- The Flintstones (1960–1965, 102 episodes on ABC)
- Hollywood Dogs (1989, 13 episodes in syndication)
- James Bond Jr. (1991, 13 episodes in syndication)
- The Little Clowns of Happytown (1987, 13 episodes on ABC)
- The New Adventures of Speed Racer (1993–1994, 26 episodes in syndication)
- Teenage Mutant Ninja Turtles (1987–1989, 80 episodes in syndication, and 1990–1996, 113 episodes on CBS)
- The Wuzzles (1985, 13 episodes on CBS)

Movies produced/directed/animated by Fred Wolf:

- Hey There, It's Yogi Bear! (1964) (animator)
- The Box (1967)
- The Point! (1971)
- The Naked Ape (1974)
- Down and Dirty Duck (1974) (as Bill Wolf) (assistant animator only)
- The Mouse and His Child (1977)
- Puff the Magic Dragon (1978, on CBS)
- Puff the Magic Dragon in the Land of the Living Lies (1979, on CBS)
- The Little Rascals Christmas Special (1979 on NBC)
- The World of Strawberry Shortcake (1980, in syndication)
- Carlton Your Doorman (1980 on CBS)
- Thanksgiving in the Land of Oz (1980, on CBS)
- Strawberry Shortcake: Big Apple City (1981, in syndication)
- Strawberry Shortcake: Pets on Parade (1982, in syndication)
- Puff and the Incredible Mr. Nobody (1982, on CBS)
- Peter and the Magic Egg (1983, in syndication)
- The Adventures of the American Rabbit (1986)
- Be My Valentine (1989, in syndication)
- Fluppy Dogs (1986, on ABC)
- Mickey's 60th Birthday (1988, on NBC)
