= 1986 in animation =

Events in 1986 in animation.

== Events ==
=== January ===
- January 1: The Peanuts New Year's Day TV special Happy New Year, Charlie Brown! premieres on CBS.
- January 19: The first episode of Maple Town is broadcast.

=== February ===
- February 3: Pixar is established.
- February 26: The first episode of Dragon Ball airs.

=== March ===
- March 5: Walter Lantz receives a star on the Hollywood Walk of Fame.
- March 19: The final episode of Urusei Yatsura is broadcast.
- March 21:
  - Care Bears Movie II: A New Generation premiers. It received generally negative reviews as it was deemed notorious for its frightening content, poor animation quality, and marketing scheme.
  - GoBots: Battle of the Rock Lords premiers.
- March 24: 58th Academy Awards: Anna & Bella by Børge Ring wins the Academy Award for Best Animated Short.
- March 26: The first episode of Maison Ikkoku is broadcast.

=== April ===
- April 25: Peter Gabriel releases his single Sledgehammer, of which the animated music video will become a classic.

=== June ===
- June 6: My Little Pony: The Movie premiers.
- June 19: Croatia Film’s The Elm-Chanted Forest premieres, which marks the first full-length animated movie directed by Milan Blažeković. The movie makes its debut in the United States five months later.
- June 27: Jim Reardon's underground cartoon Bring Me the Head of Charlie Brown is first released.

=== July ===
- July 2: The Great Mouse Detective, produced by the Walt Disney Company, is first released.
- July 20: Super Mario Bros.: The Great Mission to Rescue Princess Peach premieres in Japan. This is the first film featuring the Super Mario Bros..
- July 25: The ill-fated Robotech: The Movie makes a limited theatrical screening in Texas and was expelled from further showings after regarding its explicit adult content while comparing to Robotech that aired on Saturday mornings at the time. Decades after its disappearance, blackmarket copies of the movie have been shared and is declared the unofficial continuity to Robotech.

=== August ===
- August 2: Hayao Miyazaki's Castle in the Sky is released, the first film produced by Studio Ghibli.
- August 8: The Transformers: The Movie premieres. The movie underperformed at the box office, received generally negative critical reviews, and gained some infamy for its excessive violence and unexpected swearing. However, it has garnered a cult following and more positive critical reassessment in the years since.
- August 17: John Lasseter's Luxo Jr. premieres. The little lamp in the short will later become part of Pixar's logo.

=== September ===
- September 13:
  - The first episode of Foofur is broadcast.
  - The first episode of Galaxy High airs.
  - The first episode of Popples airs.
  - The first episode of Pound Puppies airs.
- September 15:
  - The first episode of Karate Kommandos airs, an animated TV series based on Chuck Norris.
  - The first part of the Soviet animated film Treasure Island, directed by David Cherkassky and produced by Kievnauchfilm, premiers on Russian TV. It marks the debut of the colorful character Dr. Livesey, who will grow into an Internet Meme by the 2020s.
- September 21: The first episode of Inhumanoids airs, which becomes notable for its remarkable gruesome imagery.
- September 22: The first episode of Dennis the Menace airs.

=== October ===
- October 12: The first episode of Janoschs Traumstunde airs.
- October 18: DIC Entertainment and ABC's Liberty and the Littles airs as a three-part episode. This is the series finale. It was originally planned to be a theatrical film, but ABC declined due to both management changes and the critical failure of Here Come the Littles that tarnished the franchise.

=== November ===
- November 21: Don Bluth's An American Tail premieres, which marks the debut of Fievel Mousekewitz. This became Bluth's most popular film and the first to start a franchise.
- Specific date in November unknown: New Zealand's first feature-length animated film, Footrot Flats: The Dog's Tale is released, based on Murray Ball's comic series Footrot Flats.

=== December ===
- December 3: The fifth Astérix film, Asterix in Britain, premiers.

=== Specific date unknown ===
- The Brothers Quay release Street of Crocodiles.

== Films released ==
- January 8 - The Trapalhoes in the Tail of the Comet (Brazil)
- January 17
  - Heathcliff: The Movie (United States, Canada, and France)
  - The Adventures of the American Rabbit (United States and Japan)
- January 30 - Matthias the Just (Hungary)
- February 1 - Creamy Mami, the Magic Angel: Curtain Call (Japan)
- February 22 - Urusei Yatsura 4: Lum the Forever (Japan)
- February 23 - Seito Shokun! Kokoro ni Midori no Neckerchief wo (Japan)
- March 3 - The Humanoid (Japan)
- March 8 - Fist of the North Star (Japan)
- March 15:
  - Arion (Japan)
  - Doraemon: Nobita and the Steel Troops (Japan)
  - Kinnikuman: Crisis in New York! (Japan)
- March 21:
  - Care Bears Movie II: A New Generation (Canada and United States)
  - GoBots: Battle of the Rock Lords (United States)
  - Prefectural Earth Defense Force (Japan)
- March 31 - Mr. Pen Pen (Japan)
- April - Saint Elmo – Hikari no Raihousha (Japan)
- April 12 - Touch: Sebangō no Nai Ace (Japan)
- May 12 - Tato, nie bój się dentysty! (Poland)
- May 21:
  - Maris the Chojo (Japan)
  - MD Geist (Japan)
- May 22 - Dot and Keeto (Australia)
- May 30:
  - Kidnapping in Tiutiurlistan (Poland)
  - Megazone 23 – Part II (Japan)
- June 6:
  - The Cosmic Eye (United States)
  - My Little Pony: The Movie (United States)
- June 7 - The Great Heep (United States)
- June 14 - Barefoot Gen 2 (Japan)
- June 19 - The Elm-Chanted Forest (Yugoslavia)
- June 21:
  - Kidnapped (Australia)
  - Project A-ko (Japan)
- June 25 - King Solomon's Mines (Australia)
- July 2:
  - The Adventures of Tom Sawyer (Australia)
  - The Great Mouse Detective (United States)
- July 5 - Armored Trooper Votoms: The Big Battle (Japan)
- July 10 - Dr. Jekyll and Mr. Hyde (Australia)
- July 12:
  - Captain Tsubasa: Sekai Daikessen!! Jr. World Cup (Japan)
  - GeGeGe no Kitarō: Saikyō Yōkai Gundan! Nihon jōriku!! (Japan)
- July 19:
  - Amon Saga (Japan)
  - Itoshi no Betty Mamonogatari (Japan)
  - Windaria (Japan)
- July 20:
  - Dokkaebi bangmang-i (South Korea)
  - Running Boy: Star Soldier's Secret (Japan)
  - Super Mario Bros.: The Great Mission to Rescue Princess Peach (Japan)
- July 25 - Robotech: The Movie (United States and Japan)
- July 26:
  - Ai City (Japan)
  - Gall Force: Eternal Story (Japan)
- July 31 - Nayuta (Japan)
- August 2:
  - Castle in the Sky (Japan)
  - Meitantei Holmes: Mrs. Hudson Hitojichi Jiken / Dover Kaikyō no Daikūchūsen! (Japan)
- August 8 - The Transformers: The Movie (United States and Japan)
- August 22:
  - Coral Reef Legend: Elfie of the Blue Sea (Japan)
  - Sangokushi II: Amakakeru otoko-tachi (Japan)
- August 24 - Galaxy Investigation 2100: Border Planet (Japan)
- August 27 - Eleven Hungry Cats and an Albatross (Japan)
- September 5 - Majo demo Steady (Japan)
- September 10:
  - Roots Search (Japan)
  - Voltron: Fleet of Doom (United States and Japan)
- September 14 - Ivanhoe (Australia)
- September 20 - The New Adventures of Monica and Her Friends (Brazil)
- October 2 - Cat City (Hungary, Canada, and West Germany)
- October 4 - The Three Musketeers (Australia)
- October 10 - Valhalla (Denmark)
- October 18 – November 1, 1986 - Liberty and the Littles (United States)
- October 24 - When the Wind Blows (United Kingdom)
- October 30 - Dot and the Whale (Australia)
- November 1:
  - Opening the Door (Japan)
  - They Were Eleven (Japan)
- November 21 - An American Tail (United States and Ireland)
- November 27 - Fluppy Dogs (United States)
- November 28:
  - Dirty Pair: Project Eden (Japan)
  - Urban Square – Kohaku no Tsuigeki (Japan)
- December 3 - Asterix in Britain (France)
- December 5 - Bolek and Lolek in the Wild West (Poland)
- December 13:
  - Grey: Digital Target (Japan)
  - Guyver: Out of Control (Japan)
  - Touch 2: Sayonara no Okurimono (Japan)
- December 16 - Outlanders (Japan)
- December 19 - Ratty (Sweden)
- December 20:
  - Dragon Ball: Curse of the Blood Rubies (Japan)
  - Gaksital (South Korea)
  - GeGeGe no Kitarō: Gekitotsu! I jigen yōkai no dai hanran (Japan)
  - Kinnikuman: Justice Supermen vs. Fighter Supermen (Japan)
  - Phoenix: Karma Chapter (Japan)
- December 21:
  - Delpower X Explosion Miracle Genki!! (Japan)
  - The Hunchback of Notre Dame (Australia)
- December 25 - Wanna-Be's (Japan)
- December 29 - Mr. Pen Pen II (Japan)
- Specific date unknown:
  - The Great Cheese Robbery (Czechoslovakia and West Germany)
  - Inhumanoids: The Movie (United States)
  - Salar (Czechoslovakia)
  - Skeletor's Revenge (United States)
  - Sophie's Place (United States)

== Television series ==
- January 6:
  - Jimbo and the Jet Set debuts on BBC One.
  - Telebugs debuts on ITV.
- January 10 - Spaceship Sagittarius debuts on TV Asahi.
- January 12 - The Story of Pollyanna, Girl of Love debuts on Fuji TV, Animax.
- January 19 - Maple Town debuts on TV Asahi.
- February 26 - Dragon Ball debuts on FNS (Fuji TV).
- March 1 - Mobile Suit Gundam ZZ debuts on Nagoya TV, TV Asahi.
- March 7 - Pastel Yumi, the Magic Idol debuts on NTV.
- March 26 - Maison Ikkoku debuts on FNS (Fuji TV).
- March 31 - Mister Pen-Pen debuts in syndication.
- April - Kideo TV debuts in syndication.
- April 3 - The Raggy Dolls debuts on ITV Network / CITV.
- April 7:
  - Ginga: Nagareboshi Gin debuts on TV Asahi.
  - The Centurions debuts in syndication.
- April 16 - Wonder Beat Scramble debuts on TBS.
- April 22 - The Blunders debuts on ITV.
- April 25 - Seishun Anime Zenshu debuts in syndication.
- May 3 - Hikari no Densetsu debuts on ANN (TV Asahi).
- May 28 - Pingu debuts on SF DRS (Switzerland) and CBeebies (United Kingdom).
- June 29 - Inhumanoids debuts in syndication.
- July 3 - Machine Robo: Revenge of Cronos debuts on TV Tokyo.
- September 6 - The Flintstone Kids debuts on ABC.
- September 8 - Defenders of the Earth, Ghostbusters, and Silverhawks debut in syndication.
- September 13:
  - Foofur, Lazer Tag Academy, and Kissyfur debut on NBC.
  - Galaxy High, Teen Wolf, and Wildfire debut on CBS.
  - Popples debuts in syndication.
  - Pound Puppies debuts on ABC.
  - Teen Wolf debuts on CBS.
  - The Real Ghostbusters debuts on ABC and in syndication.
  - The Care Bears Family debuts on Global Television Network.
- September 14 - The Adventures of the Galaxy Rangers and The New Adventures of Jonny Quest debut in syndication.
- September 15: Chuck Norris: Karate Kommandos and Rambo: The Force of Freedom debut in syndication.
- September 22 - Dennis the Menace debuts in syndication (1986-1987) and CBS (1988).
- September 23 - The Glo Friends debuts in syndication.
- September 24 - Potato Head Kids debuts in syndication.
- September 25 - MoonDreamers debuts in syndication.
- October 3 - Bug-Tte Honey and Heart Cocktail debut on NTV.
- October 5 - Anmitsu Hime debuts on Fuji TV, RAB, and YBS.
- October 6:
  - Bosco Adventure debuts on Yomiuri TV.
  - The Wonderful Wizard of Oz and Oh! Family debut on TV Tokyo.
- October 7 - The Bluffers debuts on AVRO.
- October 11 - Saint Seiya debuts on TV Asahi.
- October 12 - Janoschs Traumstunde debuts on ARD and KiKa.
- October 14 - Doteraman debuts on NTV.
- October 15:
  - Dorimogu Daa!! debuts in syndication.
  - Ganbare Kickers debuts on NTV.
- December 24 - The Adventures of Teddy Ruxpin debuts in syndication.
- Specific date unknown:
  - Dick Spanner, P.I. debuts on Channel 4.
  - G-Force: Guardians of Space debuts on TBS.

== Births ==
=== January ===
- January 4: Lo Mutuc, American actor, comedian, musician, and writer (voice of Ruby in the Steven Universe franchise, Chloe Park in We Bare Bears, Alice in Summer Camp Island, Mai Su in Next Gen, Pennywhistle in Trolls World Tour, Abbey Posey in The Mitchells vs. the Machines, Larry in StuGo, the Guardian in the Amphibia episode "The Hardest Thing").
- January 6:
  - Stu Livingston, American animator, storyboard artist (Pink Panther & Pals, Good Vibes, Napoleon Dynamite, Futurama, Cartoon Network Studios, Penn Zero: Part-Time Hero, The Owl House, The Loud House, Disenchantment), writer (Craig of the Creek) and director (Hey Arnold!: The Jungle Movie, Craig of the Creek, The Owl House).
  - Shane Sweet, American actor (voice of Tim Drake / Robin in the Static Shock episode "Future Shock", additional voices in The Mitchells vs. the Machines, 3Below: Tales of Arcadia, Big Hero 6, Arcane, What If...?, Spies in Disguise, and The Star).
- January 7: Luke Ruegger, American former voice actor and son of Tom Ruegger (voice of Big Fat Baby in Histeria!, the Flame and Bumpo in Animaniacs).
- January 8: Jaclyn Linetsky, Canadian actress (voice of the title character in Caillou, Meg in Mega Babies, second voice of Lori in What's with Andy?), (d. 2003).
- January 12: Dominique Moore, English actress and writer (voice of Flo in Floogals, Lulu in Sadie Sparks, Ruth in Thomas & Friends).
- January 24:
  - Guz Khan, British comedian, impressionist, and actor (voice of Zane Troy in Digman!).
  - Mischa Barton, English-American actress (voice of Betty Ann Bongo in KaBlam!).

=== February ===
- February 8: Anderson .Paak, American singer, rapper, songwriter and actor (voice of Prince Darnell in Trolls, TK in We Baby Bears, Anderswim .Shaark in the Baby Shark's Big Show! episode "Saltwater Studios").
- February 14: Justin Michael, American actor (voice of Tex Jr., Mr. Weaselbrat and Robby Burgles in Buddy Thunderstruck, Funshine Bear in Care Bears: Unlock the Magic, Kevin, Soldier Turtle, Turtle Guard and Roy in Infinity Train, Boy in Boy Girl Dog Cat Mouse Cheese, Nevin in The Fungies!), writer (Infinity Train), producer and director (Cake).
- February 15: Ami Koshimizu, Japanese actress and singer (voice of Ryuko Matoi in Kill la Kill, Makoto Kino / Sailor Jupiter in Sailor Moon Crystal, Kallen Stadtfeld in Code Geass, Hibiki Houjou / Cure Melody in Suite PreCure).
- February 22: Miko Hughes, American actor (voice of Tommy Anderson in Life with Louie, Jeremy Creek in The Town Santa Forgot, Prince Fredolin in the Adventures from the Book of Virtues episode "Generosity").
- February 24:
  - Bryce Papenbrook, American voice actor (voice of Kirito in Sword Art Online, Eren Yeager in Attack on Titan, Inosuke Hashibira in Demon Slayer: Kimetsu no Yaiba, Rin Okumura in Blue Exorcist, Masaomi Kida in Durarara!!, Caesar Anthonio Zeppeli in JoJo's Bizarre Adventure, Shirou Emiya in Fate/stay night: Unlimited Blade Works, Meliodas and Zeldris in The Seven Deadly Sins, Red in Pokémon Origins, Kaito in Ajin: Demi-Human, Makoto Naegi and Nagito Komaeda in Danganronpa, Lance in Glitter Force Doki Doki, Adrien Agreste/Cat Noir and Félix Fathom in Miraculous: Tales of Ladybug & Cat Noir).
  - Benny Safdie, American actor and filmmaker (voice of Bowser Jr. in The Super Mario Galaxy Movie).
- February 25:
  - Justin Berfield, American former actor, writer and producer (voice of Gill in Kim Possible, Ving in The Fairly OddParents episode "Crash Nebula").
  - Jameela Jamil, British actress (voice of Gandra Dee in DuckTales, Wonder Woman in DC League of Super-Pets, Auntie Pushpa in Mira, Royal Detective, Roxie in Jurassic World Camp Cretaceous, Ensign Asencia in Star Trek: Prodigy, Buttercup in the Robot Chicken episode "Mushya Shakhtyorov in: Honeyboogers", Christine S. in the American Dad! episode "Exquisite Corpses", Sultana in the Animaniacs episode "1001 Narfs", Lady De-Clutter in the Rugrats episode of the same name, Eris in the Harley Quinn episode "Bachelorette").
- February 28: Yūko Sanpei, Japanese actress (voice of Nozomi Yumehara/Cure Dream in Yes! PreCure 5, Boruto Uzumaki in Boruto: Naruto Next Generation, Taka Kamitani in School Babysitters).

=== March ===
- March 6: Eli Marienthal, American actor (voice of Hogarth Hughes in The Iron Giant, Tim Drake/Robin in Batman: Mystery of the Batwoman and the Static Shock episode "The Big Leagues", Dak in the Batman Beyond episode "Where's Terry?", Derek Minna in the Fillmore! episode "Two Wheels, Full Throttle, No Brakes").
- March 7: Nick Pitera, American singer, animator and YouTuber (Pixar).
- March 9: Brittany Snow, American actress (voice of Nadia in Shimmer and Shine, Candy in the Family Guy episode "Quagmire's Baby", Tracy in the TripTank episode "Steve's Family").
- March 12: Debora Arroyo, American design coordinator (Pink Panther and Pals, Futurama), production manager (The Ricky Gervais Show, Infinity Train), production coordinator (The Ricky Gervais Show, Good Vibes, Clarence) and producer (We Baby Bears).
- March 13: Emily Brundige, American voice actress (voice of Sara in Over the Garden Wall, Stacy in Ollie & Scoops), production intern (China, IL), television writer (The Powerpuff Girls, Warner Bros. Animation, Home: Adventures with Tip & Oh, Harvey Girls Forever!, Amphibia, Hilda, Big Nate), and creator of Pubertina, Goldie and Strawberry Vampire.
- March 14: Jamie Bell, English actor (voice and motion-capture of Tintin in The Adventures of Tintin, Danny in Cranston Academy: Monster Zone).
- March 16: Alexandra Daddario, American actress (voice of Lois Lane in Superman: Man of Tomorrow, Theresa Johnson in the Robot Chicken episode "Joel Hurwitz Returns", herself in the Koala Man episode "Bin Day").
- March 26: Carol-Anne Day, Canadian voice actress (voice of Mai Tokiha in My-HiME, Allenby Beardsley in Mobile Fighter G Gundam, Fionna in Zoids: Chaotic Century).
- March 28:
  - Lady Gaga, American musician and actress (voiced herself in The Simpsons episode "Lisa Goes Gaga").
  - Meagan Smith, American voice actress (voice of Gwen Tennyson in Ben 10).

=== April ===
- April 3: Amanda Bynes, American actress (voice of Taffy and Princess in Rugrats, Nellie in Charlotte's Web 2: Wilbur's Great Adventure, Piper in Robots, Anna in the Family Guy episode "Long John Peter").
- April 9: Leighton Meester, American actress (voice of Poppy in the Monster Allergy episode "House of Monsters", Sasha the Tiger in My Father's Dragon).
- April 27: Jenna Coleman, English actress (voice of Baines in the Thunderbirds Are Go episode "Earthbreaker").
- April 30: Dianna Agron, American actress and singer (voice of News Anchor in Ralph Breaks the Internet, various characters in the Robot Chicken episode "Max Caenen in: Why Would He Know If His Mother's A Size Queen").

=== May ===
- May 6: Sasheer Zamata, American actress and stand-up comedian (voice of Adria Layfayette in Moon Girl and Devil Dinosaur, Jade in The Mitchells vs. the Machines, Kara in Tuca & Bertie, Maisie in Albert, Mama Lemon in The Fungies!, Devilcat in Exploding Kittens).
- May 11: Sean Jara, Canadian-born American cartoonist, animator, and television writer (PAW Patrol, Johnny Test, American Dragon: Jake Long, Max Steel).
- May 17: Tahj Mowry, American actor and singer (voice of Wade Load in Kim Possible, young Sonic in the Sonic the Hedgehog episode "Blast to the Past", King Mamoud in the Aladdin episode "Bad Moon Rising").
- May 19: Eric Lloyd, American actor (voice of Neddie Hugson in The Oz Kids, Blanky in The Brave Little Toaster to the Rescue and The Brave Little Toaster Goes to Mars, Josh in the Rocket Power episode "All About Sam").
- May 21: Da'Vine Joy Randolph, American actress (voice of Mama Luna in Puss in Boots: The Last Wish, Bliss Marina in Trolls World Tour, Ranger Hoof in Madagascar: A Little Wild).
- May 26: Ed Skudder, American animator, director, writer, producer, musician, and voice actor (Dick Figures, Unikitty!, Teen Titans Go!, The Cuphead Show!, The Drawn Together Movie: The Movie!, Invader Zim: Enter the Florpus, The Super Mario Bros. Movie).
- May 28: Colby Lopez, American pro wrestler (voiced himself in The Jetsons & WWE: Robo-WrestleMania! and Norm and delivery guy in Trouble)

=== June ===
- June 11: Shia LaBeouf, American actor, performance artist and filmmaker (voice of Cody Maverick in Surf's Up, Asbel in Nausicaä of the Valley of the Wind, Johnny McBride in The Proud Family episode "I Love You Penny Proud").
- June 13:
  - Mary-Kate Olsen, American fashion designer and former actress (voiced herself in Mary-Kate and Ashley in Action! and The Simpsons episode "Diatribe of a Mad Housewife").
  - Ashley Olsen, American fashion designer, businesswoman and former actress (voiced herself in Mary-Kate and Ashley in Action! and The Simpsons episode "Diatribe of a Mad Housewife").
  - Kat Dennings, American actress (voice of Leah Birch in Big Mouth, Valerie in The Simpsons episode "Mr. Lisa's Opus", Tanqueray in the American Dad! episode "G-String Circus", Darcy Lewis in What If...?).
- June 17: Marie Avgeropoulos, Canadian actress (voice of Vanessa Kapatelis / Silver Swan in Wonder Woman: Bloodlines).
- June 18: Natasha Allegri, American animation creator, writer, storyboard artist, and comic book artist (Bee and Puppycat, Adventure Time).
- June 24: Solange Knowles, American singer, songwriter and actress (voice of Chanel in The Proud Family episode "Behind Family Lines").
- June 26: Brittany Karbowski, American voice actress (Funimation, Sentai Filmworks, ADV Films).
- June 27: Drake Bell, American actor and musician (voice of Spider-Man in The Avengers: Earth's Mightiest Heroes, Ultimate Spider-Man, Avengers Assemble, Hulk and the Agents of S.M.A.S.H., and the Phineas and Ferb episode "Phineas and Ferb: Mission Marvel", Michael Morningstar in the Ben 10 episode "Bright Lights, Black Hearts", Harold Kelp in The Nutty Professor).
- June 28:
  - Matteo Lane, American actor, comedian, singer and illustrator (voice of Corvin in Magical Girl Friendship Squad).
  - Suzuko Mimori, Japanese actress (voice of Umi Sonoda in Love Live!, Asumi Fuurin / Cure Earth in Healin' Good Pretty Cure, dub voice of Pinkie Pie in My Little Pony: Friendship Is Magic).
  - Ian Hanlin, Canadian actor (voice of Sunburst in My Little Pony: Friendship Is Magic, Acronix in Ninjago, Fire Man and Air Man in Mega Man: Fully Charged, Shadow the Hedgehog in Sonic Prime).

=== July ===
- July 2: Lindsay Lohan, American actress and singer (voice of Maggie Simpson in The Simpsons episode "Parahormonal Activity", Jenny Medina in the King of the Hill episode "Talking Shop", Ziva in the Devil May Care episode "The Date", herself in My Scene Goes Hollywood: The Movie).
- July 21: Diane Guerrero, American actress (voice of Jessica Cruz in Justice League vs. the Fatal Five, Vestia in Elena of Avalor, Isabela Madrigal in Encanto).

=== August ===
- August 8: Peyton List, American actress (voice of Poison Ivy in Batman: Hush, Josephine Grant in Blade Runner: Black Lotus).
- August 13: Ashley Spillers, American actress and comedian (voice of Didi Pickles in Rugrats, Jill the Frog in Muppet Babies, June Moore in DC Super Hero Girls).
- August 17: Bryton James, American actor (voice of Static in Young Justice, Roy in Winx Club, Zare Leonis in Star Wars Rebels, Mark Surge in Hero Factory, Jason James / Z-Strap in Zevo-3).
- August 28: Armie Hammer, American actor (voice of Jackson Storm in Cars 3, Zook in The Polar Bears, Strong Arm in Stan Lee's Mighty 7, Cameron and Tyler Winklevoss in The Simpsons episode "The D'oh-cial Network", Car Rental Agent in the American Dad episode "The Wrestler").
- August 29: Lea Michele, American actress, singer, songwriter and author (voice of Christina in Buster & Chauncey's Silent Night, Dorothy Gale in Legends of Oz: Dorothy's Return, Rachel Berry in The Cleveland Show episode "How Do You Solve a Problem Like Roberta?", herself in The Simpsons episode "Elementary School Musical").
- August 31: Spencer Klein, American former child actor (voice of Arnold in seasons 4-5 of Hey Arnold! and Hey Arnold!: The Movie, George and Robert Chestnut in Fillmore!).

=== September ===
- September 16: Kyla Pratt, American actress (voice of Penny Proud in The Proud Family franchise).
- September 30: Ki Hong Lee, Korean-American actor (voice of Amadeus Cho in Spider-Man, Cody Martin and Naruto Uzumaki in the Robot Chicken episode "May Cause Lucid Murder Dreams").

=== October ===
- October 1:
  - Jurnee Smollett, American actress (voice of Chrysta in Sofia the First, Ali Baba in the Happily Ever After: Fairy Tales for Every Child episode "Ali Baba and the Forty Thieves").
  - Sayaka Kanda, Japanese actress and singer (Japanese dub voice of Anna in the Frozen franchise), (d. 2021).
- October 15 Paul Walter Hauser, American actor (voice of Embarrassment in Inside Out 2, The Dark in Orion and the Dark, Elmer in Aqua Teen Forever: Plantasm).
- October 23: Emilia Clarke, English actress (voice of Marianne in the Futurama episode "Stench and Stenchibility", Bridget in the Robot Chicken episode "Joel Hurwitz Returns", Lumpy in the Animals episode "Rats.", Doyle in the Thunderbirds Are Go episode "Rigged for Disaster").
- October 24:
  - Drake, Canadian rapper, singer, and actor (voice of Ethan in Ice Age: Continental Drift).
  - Nobuhiko Okamoto, Japanese voice actor and singer (voice of Rin Okumura in Blue Exorcist, Accelerator in A Certain Magical Index, Mikoto Mikoshiba in Monthly Girls' Nozaki-kun, Katsuki Bakugo in My Hero Academia, Karma Akabane in Ansatsu Kyoshitsu, Yū Nishinoya in Haikyū, Shū Inuzuka in Shikimori's Not Just a Cutie).
- October 28: May Calamawy, Egyptian-Palestinian actress (voice of Fawiza in the Moon Girl and Devil Dinosaur episode "Goodnight, Moon Girl").

=== November ===
- November 10: Josh Peck, American actor (voice of Casey Jones in Teenage Mutant Ninja Turtles, Eddie in the Ice Age franchise, Lenny in Whatever Happened to... Robot Jones?, Randall Julian in the Fillmore! episode "To Mar a Stall").
- November 18: Joseph Ashton, American former actor (voice of Otto Rocket in Rocket Power, Iggy in Hey Arnold!).
- November 21: Sam Palladio, English actor and musician (voice of Roland in Strange Magic).

=== December ===
- December 19: Annie Murphy, Canadian actress (voice of Klaus' Date in American Dad! episode "Flush After Reading", Queen Nerissa and Chelsea Van Der Zee in Ruby Gillman, Teenage Kraken, Petey St. Barts in Praise Petey).
- December 23: Noël Wells, American actress, writer, director, and musician (voice of Lord Dominator in Wander Over Yonder, Kelsey Pokoly in Craig of the Creek, Ensign D'Vana Tendi in Star Trek: Lower Decks, June in the DuckTales episode "The Last Adventure!").
- December 26: Kit Harington, English actor (voice of Eret in the How to Train Your Dragon franchise).
- December 29: Ally Maki, American actress (voice of Giggle McDimples in Toy Story 4, Viney in The Owl House, Haruka in Hit-Monkey).

=== Specific date unknown ===
- Jonathan Gales, English animator and creative director (co-founder of Factory Fifteen), (d. 2022).

== Deaths ==
=== January ===
- January 7: P. D. Eastman, American screenwriter, children's author, and illustrator (Private Snafu, UPA), dies at age 76.
- January 23: Frank Grundeen, American animator and comics artist (Walt Disney Company), dies at age 74.

=== February ===
- February 16: Andrzej Pawłowski, Polish painter, sculptor, photographer, and film director (Kineformy, Naturally Shaped Forms, Mannequins), dies at age 60.
- February 17: Paul Stewart, American actor (voice of Mighty Mightor), dies at age 77.

=== March ===
- March 6: Adolph Caesar, American actor (voice of Hotwing and Seymour in SilverHawks, Brutish in Tarzoon: Shame of the Jungle), dies at age 52.
- March 16: George Jackson, English animator (Watership Down, The Plague Dogs, Danger Mouse, The BFG), dies at age 64.
- March 25: Gloria Blondell, American actress (second voice of Daisy Duck in several Donald Duck cartoons), dies at age 70.

=== April ===
- April 2: Jack Manning, American comics artist and animator (Walt Disney Company, Hanna-Barbera), dies at age 65.
- April 19: Alvin Childress, American actor (voice of Jasper in Puppetoons), dies at age 78.
- April 22: Dick Moores, American comics artist and animator (Telecomics Inc.), dies at age 75.
- April 30: Robert Stevenson, British-American screenwriter and film director (Mary Poppins, Bedknobs and Broomsticks), dies at age 81.

=== May ===
- May 1: Arthur Lipsett, Canadian film director and animator (Very Nice, Very Nice, 21-87, A Trip Down Memory Lane), commits suicide at age 49.
- May 9: Herschel Bernardi, American actor (voice of Charlie the Tuna and The Jolly Green Giant), dies at age 62.
- May 24: George Gordon, American animator and film director (Terrytoons, MGM, Hanna-Barbera), dies at age 79.
- May 28: Lurene Tuttle, American actress (voice of Duck's Mother in Down and Dirty Duck, Clara's Grandmother in The Story of Heidi, Aunt Gerda in Nutcracker Fantasy, Carlton's Mother in Carlton Your Doorman, Aunt Em in Thanksgiving in the Land of Oz), dies at age 78.

=== June ===
- June 13: Benny Goodman, American jazz band leader (provided music to the All the Cats Join In and After You've Gone segments in Make Mine Music), dies at age 77.

=== July ===
- July 22: Floyd Gottfredson, American cartoonist, apprentice animator and in-betweener (Walt Disney Animation Studios, Mickey Mouse comic strip), dies at age 81.

=== August ===
- August 19: Hermione Baddeley, English actress (voice of Madame Adelaide Bonfamille in The Aristocats, Auntie Shrew in The Secret of NIMH), dies at age 79.
- August 26: Ted Knight, American actor (voice of Commander Jonathan Kidd in Fantastic Voyage, Black Manta in The Superman/Aquaman Hour of Adventure, Commissioner Gordon, Penguin, Riddler, Mr. Freeze, Scarecrow, and Mad Hatter in The Adventures of Batman, narrator and the Flash in Super Friends, Ben Turner in Lassie's Rescue Rangers, Carter Winston/Vendorian in the Star Trek: The Animated Series episode "The Survivor"), dies at age 62.

=== September ===
- September 12: Frank Nelson, American comedic actor (voice of Mr. Cow in Tootsie Pop commercials, Uncle Dudley in Dinky Dog, Tall Doctor in Puff the Magic Dragon, Wizzar in Monchhichis, Governor Wetworth in Snorks, Dr. Pavlov in Foofur, Satan in The Looney Looney Looney Bugs Bunny Movie), dies at age 75.
- September 15: Virginia Gregg, American actress (voice of Tara in The Herculoids), dies at age 70.

=== October ===
- October 11: David Hand, American animator and film director (Walt Disney Company, Gaumont), dies at age 86.
- October 14: Keenan Wynn, American actor (voice of the Winter Warlock in Santa Claus Is Comin' to Town, Captain Cully and the Harpy in The Last Unicorn), dies at age 70.

=== November ===
- November 2: Paul Frees, American actor and screenwriter (voice of Boris Badenov in Rocky and Bullwinkle, Inspector Fenwick in Dudley Do-Right, Ludwig von Drake in Disney anthology television series, Muscles in Jerry's Cousin, John Lennon and George Harrison in The Beatles, Burgermeister Meisterburger and Grimsley in Santa Claus Is Comin' to Town), dies at age 66.
- November 11: Roger C. Carmel, American actor (voice of Cyclonus and Unicron in The Transformers, Harry Mudd in the Star Trek: The Animated Series episode "Mudd's Passion", Sultan in the DuckTales episode "Master of the Djinni", continued voice of Sir Tuxford in Adventures of the Gummi Bears, additional voices in The Berenstain Bears and The New Adventures of Jonny Quest), dies at age 54.
- November 22:
  - Jerry Colonna, American comedian, singer and musician and actor (narrator of the Casey at the Bat segment in Make Mine Music and the short The Brave Engineer, voice of the March Hare in Alice in Wonderland), dies at age 82.
  - Scatman Crothers, American voice actor (voice of Scat Cat in The Aristocats, Meadowlark Lemon in Harlem Globetrotters, Hong Kong Phooey in Hong Kong Phooey, Old Man Bone in Coonskin, Jazz in The Transformers), dies at age 76.
- November 23:
  - Norman Maurer, American comics artist, animator, screenwriter, and film producer (Hanna-Barbera), dies at age 60 from cancer.
  - Frank Smith, American animator and comics artist (Walt Disney Company, Harman-Ising), dies at age 78.
- November 25: Don Towsley, American animator (Walt Disney Company, Hanna-Barbera, Chuck Jones, Filmation), dies at age 74.
- November 29: Herb Vigran, American actor (voice of narrator in What's My Lion?, Glum in The Adventures of Gulliver, Lurvy in Charlotte's Web, Museum Man in The Super Globetrotters episode "The Super Globetrotters vs. Museum Man", Mr. Dinkle in Shirt Tales, Hopps in Starchaser: The Legend of Orin, additional voices in The Plastic Man Comedy/Adventure Show and Saturday Supercade), dies at age 76.

=== December ===
- December 12: Carlos Ramírez, Colombian singer (opera voice in Tex Avery's Magical Maestro), dies at age 70.
- December 13: Heather Angel, English actress (voice of Alice's sister in Alice in Wonderland, Mrs. Darling in Peter Pan), dies at age 77.
- December 31: Elmer Plummer, American painter and animator (Warner Bros. Cartoons, Walt Disney Studios), dies at age 76.

=== Specific date unknown ===
- Isadore Klein, American animator and screenwriter (Terrytoons, Walt Disney Animation Studios, Famous Studios), dies at age 88.

== See also ==
- 1986 in anime
