= List of animated feature films of 1986 =

This is a list of animated feature films first released in 1986.

== List ==
Title	Country	Director	Production company	Animation technique	Format	Notes	Release date	Duration
The Adventures of the American Rabbit	United States; Japan	Fred Wolf; Nobutaka Nishizawa	Clubhouse Pictures; Murakami-Wolf-Swenson	Traditional	Theatrical	Based on the painting character created in 1974 by Stewart Moskowitz (July 6, 1941 – May 23, 2017).	January 17, 1986	82 minutes
The Adventures of Tom Sawyer	Australia		Burbank Films Australia	Traditional	Television film		July 2, 1986	51 minutes
Ai City アイ・シティ (Ai Shiti)	Japan	Kōichi Mashimo	Toho; Movic; Ashi Productions	Traditional	Theatrical		July 26, 1986	86 minutes
An American Tail	United States; Ireland	Don Bluth	Sullivan Bluth Studios; Amblin Entertainment; Universal Pictures (distributor)	Traditional	Theatrical	The third animated feature released by Universal Pictures, and the first the studio produced.	November 21, 1986	80 minutes
Amon Saga アモン・サーガ (Amon Sāga)	Japan	Shunji Ōga	Tohokushinsha Film	Traditional	Direct-to-video; OVA		July 19, 1986	75 minutes
Arion アリオン	Japan	Yoshikazu Yasuhiko	Toho (distributor); Sunrise	Traditional	Theatrical		March 15, 1986	118 minutes
Armored Trooper Votoms: The Big Battle 装甲騎兵ボトムズ ビッグバトル (Sōkō Kihei Botomuzu: Big Battle)	Japan	Ryousuke Takahashi	Sunrise; Bandai Visual (distributor)	Traditional	Direct-to-video; OVA		July 5, 1986	60 minutes
Asterix in Britain; Astérix chez les Bretons (Asterix among the Britons)	France	Pino van Lamsweerde	Gaumont (distributor); Dargaud Films; Gutenberghus	Traditional	Theatrical	Fourth installment in the Asterix film series; Plot adapted from volume 8 of the comic book series.	November 20, 1986	79 minutes
Barefoot Gen 2 はだしのゲン2 (Hadashi no Gen 2)	Japan	Toshio Hirata	Madhouse	Traditional	Theatrical	Sequel to Barefoot Gen (1983).	June 14, 1986	85 minutes
Bolek and Lolek in the Wild West; Bolek i Lolek na Dzikim Zachodzie	Poland	Stanislaw Dulz	Studio Filmów Rysunkowych	Traditional	Theatrical		December 5, 1986	71 minutes
California Crisis: Gun Salvo カリフォルニア・クライシス 追撃の銃火 (California Crisis - Tsuigeki no Hibana)	Japan	Mizuho Nishikubo	Hiro Media; Studio Unicorn; Shochiku; CBS/FOX Video (distributor)	Traditional	Direct-to-video; OVA		July 21, 1986	45 minutes
Captain Tsubasa: Sekai Daikessen!! Jr. World Cup 世界大決戦!! Jr.ワールドカップ (Captain Tsubasa: The Great World Battle!! Jr. World Cup)	Japan	Tatsuya Okamoto	Tsuchida Production	Traditional	Theatrical	Fourth feature film in the Captain Tsubasa anime series.	July 12, 1986	57 minutes
Care Bears Movie II: A New Generation	Canada; United States	Dale Schott	LBS Communications; Nelvana Limited	CG Animation	Theatrical	Sequel/prequel to The Care Bears Movie (1985).	March 21, 1986	76 minutes
Castle in the Sky 天空の城ラピュタ (Tenkū no Shiro Rapyuta)	Japan	Hayao Miyazaki	Toei; Studio Ghibli	Traditional	Theatrical	Studio Ghibli's first anime feature film.	August 2, 1986	124 minutes
Cat City; Macskafogó (Cat Catcher)	Hungary; Canada; West Germany	Béla Tervovszky	Pannónia Filmstúdió; Sefel Pictures International; Infafilm Gmbh	Traditional	Theatrical		October 2, 1986	96 minutes
Coral Reef Legend: Elfie of the Blue Sea サンゴ礁伝説 青い海のエルフィ (Sango-sho Densetsu: Aoi Umi no Erufii)	Japan	Yoshio Kuroda	Nippon Animation; Fuji TV	Traditional	Television film		August 22, 1986	72 minutes
The Cosmic Eye	United States	Faith Hubley	Hubley Studios	Traditional	Theatrical		June 6, 1986	72 minutes
Creamy Mami, the Magic Angel: Curtain Call 魔法の天使クリィミーマミ カーテンコール (Mahou no Tenshi Creamy Mami: Curtain Call)	Japan	Kazunori Itō; Mochizuki Tomomichi	Studio Pierrot	Traditional	Direct-to-video; OVA		February 1, 1986	45 minutes
Delpower X Explosion Miracle Genki!! デルパワーX爆発みらくる元気！ (Delpower X Bakuhatsu Miracle Genki!!)	Japan	Masato Sato	Big Bang; Nippon Columbia Co., Ltd. Kindaieigasha Co., Ltd. Shindosha	Traditional	Direct-to-video; OVA		December 21, 1986	42 minutes
Dirty Pair: Project Eden ダーティペア（劇場版） (Daati Pea Gekijou-ban)	Japan	Kōichi Mashimo	Sunrise	Traditional	Theatrical		November 28, 1986	85 minutes
Dokkaebi bangmang-i 도깨비 방망이 (The Goblin's Bat)	South Korea	Bak Seung-cheol	3rd Advertisement	Traditional	Theatrical		July 20, 1986	60 minutes
Doraemon: Nobita and the Steel Troops ドラえもん のび太と鉄人兵団 (Doraemon: Nobita to Tetsujin Heidan)	Japan	Tsutomu Shibayama	Shin-Ei Animation; Asatsu; Toho	Traditional	Theatrical		March 15, 1986	97 minutes
Dot and Keeto	Australia	Yoram Gross	Yoram Gross Films	Traditional/Live action	Theatrical		May 22, 1986	75 minutes
Dot and the Whale	Australia	Yoram Gross	Yoram Gross Films	Traditional/Live action	Theatrical		October 30, 1986	75 minutes
Dr. Jekyll and Mr. Hyde	Australia		Burbank Films Australia	Traditional	Television film		July 10, 1986	50 minutes
Dragon Ball: Curse of the Blood Rubies ドラゴンボール 神龍の伝説 (Doragon Bōru Shenron no Densetsu)	Japan	Daisuke Nishio	Toei Animation	Traditional	Theatrical	First installment of the Dragon Ball film series.	December 20, 1986	50 minutes
Eleven Hungry Cats and an Albatross; 11ぴきのねことあほうどり (Juippiki no Neko to Ahōdori)	Japan	Tameo Kohanawa	Group TAC	Traditional	Theatrical	Sequel to Eleven Hungry Cats (1980).	August 27, 1986	90 minutes
The Elm-Chanted Forest Čudesna šuma	Yugoslavia	Milan Blažeković; Doro Vlado Hreljanovic	Croatia Film; Fantasy Forest Films Inc.	Traditional	Theatrical	First Yugoslavian (Croatian) animated feature.	June 19, 1986	79 minutes
Fist of the North Star 北斗の拳 (Hokuto no Ken)	Japan	Toyoo Ashida	Toei Animation	Traditional	Theatrical		March 8, 1986	110 minutes
Fluppy Dogs	United States	Fred Wolf	Walt Disney Television Animation	Traditional	Television special	Pilot film for an intended animated television series, although the aforementioned series was never produced.	November 27, 1986	44 minutes
Footrot Flats: The Dog's ~~Tail~~ Tale	New Zealand	Murray Ball	Kerridge-Odeon	Traditional	Theatrical	First New Zealand animated feature.	April 9, 1986	71 minutes
Gaksital 각시탈 (Bridal Mask)	South Korea	Lee Hag-bin		Traditional	Theatrical		December 20, 1986	
Galaxy Investigation 2100: Border Planet 銀河探査2100年 ボーダープラネット (Ginga tansa 2100-nen: Bôdâ puranetto)	Japan	Osamu Tezuka	Tezuka Productions; Nippon TV	Traditional	Television film	Ninth animated special produced for Nippon TV's 24 Hour TV "Love Saves the Earth" telethon.	August 24, 1986	73 minutes
Gall Force: Eternal Story ガルフォース —エターナル・ストーリー (Garu Fōsu Etānaru Sutōrī)	Japan	Katsuhito Akiyama	Artmic; AIC	Traditional	Theatrical		July 26, 1986	85 minutes
GeGeGe no Kitarō: Gekitotsu! I jigen yōkai no dai hanran ゲゲゲの鬼太郎 激突!!異次元妖怪の大反乱 (GeGeGe no Kitarō: Clash!! The Great Rebellion of the Dimensional Yokai)	Japan	Hiroki Shibata	Toei Animation	Traditional	Theatrical		December 20, 1986	48 minutes
GeGeGe no Kitarō: Saikyō Yōkai Gundan! Nihon jōriku!! ゲゲゲの鬼太郎 最強妖怪軍団!日本上陸!! (GeGeGe no Kitarō: The Strongest Yokai Army!! Disembark for Japan!)	Japan	Serikawa Yuware	Toei Animation	Traditional	Theatrical		July 12, 1986	49 minutes
GoBots: Battle of the Rock Lords	United States	Ray Patterson	Clubhouse Pictures; Hanna-Barbera Productions; Tonka	Traditional	Theatrical		March 21, 1986	71 minutes
The Good Soldier Schweik; Osudy dobrého vojáka Švejka	Czechoslovakia	Stanislav Látal	Krátký film Praha; Ústrední Pujcovna Filmu (Distributor)	Stop motion	Theatrical		January 1, 1986	90 minutes
The Great Cheese Robbery; Velká sýrová loupez	Czechoslovakia; West Germany	Václav Bedrich	Krátký film Praha – Studio Bratri v triku Westdeutscher Rundfunk (WDR)	Traditional				55 minutes
The Great Heep	United States	Clive A. Smith	Nelvana; Lucasfilm	Traditional	Television special		June 7, 1986	48 minutes
The Great Mouse Detective	United States	Ron Clements; Burny Mattinson; Dave Michener; John Musker	Walt Disney Feature Animation	Traditional	Theatrical		July 2, 1986	74 minutes
Grey: Digital Target; GREY デジタル・ターゲット (Gurei Dejitaru Tāgetto)	Japan	Tetsu Dezaki	Ashi Productions; Magic Bus; Tokuma Japan Communications; Tokuma Shoten	Traditional	Theatrical		December 13, 1986	73 minutes
Guyver: Out of Control 強殖装甲ガイバー (Kyōshoku Sōkō Guyver)	Japan	Hiroshi Watanabe	Bandai; Studio Live; Network; Animate; Movic; AIC; Artland; Studio Victory; Wave; Only For A Lite	Traditional	Direct-to-video; OVA		December 13, 1986	55 minutes
Heathcliff: The Movie	United States; Canada; France	Bruno Bianchi	DIC Entertainment; LBS Communications; McNaught Syndicate	Traditional	Theatrical	Film compiled from TV series episodes	January 17, 1986	70 minutes
High School! Kimengumi ハイスクール!奇面組 (Hai Sukūru! Kimengumi)	Japan	Makoto Moriwaki	NAS; Toei Company (distributor)	Traditional	Theatrical		July 12, 1986	51 minutes
The Humanoid ザ・ヒューマノイド 哀の惑星レザリア (The Humanoid – Ai no Wakusei Lazeria)	Japan	Shin'ichi Masaki	Kaname Production; Nishiko Pro; Hiromedia Co., Ltd. Toshiba EMI	Traditional	Direct-to-video; OVA		March 3, 1986	45 minutes
The Hunchback of Notre Dame	Australia	Geoff Collins	Burbank Films Australia	Traditional	Television film		December 21, 1986	52 minutes
Inhumanoids: The Movie	United States	Ray Lee	Hasbro; Marvel Productions; Sunbow Productions; Toei Animation	Traditional	Direct-to-video; Compilation film	Compilation film of the 15-episode animated television miniseries ran in 1986, as part of the series Super Sunday that ran from June 29 to October 5, 1986.	?	
Itoshi no Betty Mamonogatari 魔物語 愛しのベティ (Betty the Beloved: A Demon Story)	Japan	Kazuo Koike (chief director); Masato Sato (unit director)	Big Bang; Shindosha; Tohokushinsha Film; Toei Company (distributor)	Traditional	Direct-to-video; OVA		July 19, 1986	53 minutes
Ivanhoe	Australia		Burbank Films Australia	Traditional	Television film		September 14, 1986	55 minutes
Jiminy Cricket: Storyteller	United States	?	Walt Disney Productions (archive footage); Disney Channel (distributor)	Traditional	Television special Compilation film	Compilation of Disney theatrical animated shorts based on children's literature; retread adaptation of "From Aesop to Hans Christian Andersen" (Season 1, Episode 19 of Disneyland; aired March 2, 1955), Eddie Carroll provided new redubbed lines for Jiminy Cricket in the special.	September 14, 1986	90 minutes
Kidnapped	Australia		Burbank Films Australia	Traditional	Television film		June 21, 1986	55 minutes
Kidnapping in Tiutiurlistan; Porwanie w Tiutiurlistanie	Poland	Franciszek Pyter, Zdzisław Kudła	Studio Filmów Rysunkowych	Traditional			May 30, 1986	90 minutes
Kinnikuman: Crisis in New York! キン肉マン ニューヨーク危機一髪！ (Kinnikuman: Nyū Yōku Kiki Ippatsu!)	Japan	Takenori Kawada	Toei Animation	Traditional	Theatrical		March 15, 1986	45 minutes
Kinnikuman: Justice Supermen vs. Fighter Supermen キン肉マン 正義超人VS戦士超人 (Kinnikuman: Seigi Chōjin vs Senshi Chōjin)	Japan	Yasuo Yamayoshi	Toei Animation	Traditional	Theatrical		December 20, 1986	51 minutes
King Solomon's Mines	Australia		Burbank Films Australia	Traditional	Television film		June 25, 1986	55 minutes
Liberty and the Littles	United States	Bernard Deyriès	DiC Entertainment	Traditional	Television special	Originally aired on the ABC anthology series ABC Weekend Special as a three-part installment on the series' tenth season.	October 18 – November 1, 1986	70 minutes
Majo demo Steady 魔女でもステディ (Even a Witch Is Steady)	Japan	Osamu Kobayashi	Herald Pony; Tokyo Media Connections; Ajia-do Animation Works	Traditional	Direct-to-video; OVA		September 5, 1986	41 minutes
Maris the Chojo ザ・超女 (Za Sūpāgyaru)	Japan	Motosuke Takahashi	Studio Pierrot; Shogakukan Production	Traditional	Direct-to-video; OVA		May 21, 1986	50 minutes
Matthias the Just; Mátyás, az igazságos	Hungary	László Újváry	Pannónia Filmstúdió	Traditional			January 30, 1986	66 minutes
MD Geist 装鬼兵MDガイスト (Sokihei M.D. Gaisuto)	Japan	Hayato Ikeda	Studio Wave; Zero G-Room	Traditional	Direct-to-video; OVA		May 21, 1986	40 minutes
Megazone 23 – Part II メガゾーン23 PART II	Japan	Ichiro Itano	AIC; Artland; Tatsunoko	Traditional	Direct-to-video; OVA		May 30, 1986	80 minutes
Meitantei Holmes: Mrs. Hudson Hitojichi Jiken / Dover Kaikyō no Daikūchūsen! 名探偵ホームズ ミセス・ハドソン人質事件/ドーバー海峡の大空中戦！ (Famous Detective Holmes: The Mrs. Hudson Kidnapping Case / The Air Battle Over Dover!)	Japan	Hayao Miyazaki	Tokyo Movie Shinsha	Traditional	Theatrical; Compilation film		August 2, 1986	46 minutes
Mr. Pen Pen; Mr．ペンペン	Japan	Ken Baba; Tetsuo Yasumi	Shin-Ei Animation; TV Asahi	Traditional	Television special		March 31, 1986	47 minutes
Mr. Pen Pen II; Mr．ペンペン II	Japan		Shin-Ei Animation; TV Asahi	Traditional	Television special	Sequel to the first Mr. Pen Pen, airing eight months after the earlier special.	December 29, 1986	46 minutes
My Little Pony: The Movie	United States	Michael Joens; Margaret Nichols	Hasbro; Sunbow Productions; Marvel Productions; Toei Animation; AKOM	Traditional	Theatrical		June 6, 1986	87 minutes
Nayuta 那由他 (Nayuta et al.)	Japan	Masami Hata	Circus Production; OB Planning; Shogakukan; Toshiba EMI	Traditional	Direct-to-video; OVA		July 31, 1986	80 minutes
The New Adventures of Monica and Friends; As Novas Aventuras da Turma da Mônica	Brazil	Mauricio de Sousa	Estúdios Maurício de Sousa; Casinha de Animação	Traditional	Theatrical; Compilation film		September 20, 1986	56 minutes
Opening the Door a. k. a. Open the Door 扉を開けて (Tobira o Akete)	Japan	Keizô Shimizu; Tsuneo Tominaga	Kitty Films; Magic Bus	Traditional	Direct-to-video; OVA		November 1, 1986	80 minutes
Outlanders アウトランダーズ (Autorandāzu)	Japan	Katsuhisa Yamada	Tatsunoko Production; Victor Musical Industries; AIC	Traditional	Direct-to-video; OVA		December 16, 1986	48 minutes
Papobo	Cuba	Hugo Alea	Estudios Cinematograficos del Instituto Cubano de Radio y Television	Stop motion	Theatrical		1986	47 minutes
Pelican Road Club Culture ペリカンロード ～クラブ・カルーチャ～	Japan	Eiichi Yamamoto	Studio World	Traditional	Direct-to-video; OVA		June 21, 1986	55 minutes
Phoenix: Karma Chapter 火の鳥 鳳凰編 (Hi no Tori: Ho-o-hen)	Japan	Rintaro	Madhouse; Tezuka Productions	Traditional	Theatrical		December 20, 1986	60 minutes
Pin-Pin's Travels; Calatoriile lui Pin-Pin	Romania	Luminița Cazacu	Animafilm	Traditional			January 1, 1986	90 minutes
Prefectural Earth Defense Force 県立地球防衛軍 (Kenritsu Chikyuu Boueigun)	Japan	Keiji Hayakawa	Gallop	Traditional	Direct-to-video; OVA		March 21, 1986	50 minutes
Project A-ko プロジェクトA子 (Purojekuto A-ko)	Japan	Katsuhiko Nishijima	Shochiku-Fuji; Soeishinsha; A.P.P.P.	Traditional			June 21, 1986	84 minutes
Ratty; Råttis	Sweden	Lennart Gustafsson	Kanalfilm; Svenska Filminstitutet (SFI)	Traditional			December 19, 1986	84 minutes
Robotech: The Movie	United States; Japan	Noboru Ishiguro; Carl Macek	Harmony Gold USA; Tatsunoko; AIC Enterprises	Traditional	Theatrical		July 25, 1986	82 minutes
Roots Search ルーツ・サーチ 食心物体X (Roots Search: Shokushin Buttai X)	Japan	Hisashi Sugai	Studio Live; Nippon Columbia	Traditional	Direct-to-video; OVA		September 10, 1986	45 minutes
Running Boy: Star Soldier's Secret; RUNNING BOY スターソルジャーの秘密 (Running Boy Star Soldier no Himitsu)	Japan	Tameo Kohanawa	Toho Company; Filmlink International; Aubec; Bebow; Cream Land	Traditional	Theatrical		July 20, 1986	46 minutes
Saint Elmo – Hikari no Raihousha セントエルモ・光の来訪者 (Saint Elmo – Apostle of Light)	Japan	Tomoharu Katsumata	Toei Animation; Kansai Electric Power Company; Mainichi Movie Company; Yomiuri TV	Traditional	Television special		April 1986	65 minutes
Salar	Czechoslovakia	Ivan Renč	Krátký film Praha				?	47 minutes
Sangokushi II: Amakakeru otoko-tachi 三国志II 天翔ける英雄たち (Three Kingdoms II: Heavenly Heroes)	Japan	Tetsuo Imazawa	Shin-Ei Animation	Traditional	Television special	Sequel to last year's Sangokushi (1985).	August 22, 1986	90 minutes
Seito Shokun! Kokoro ni Midori no Neckerchief wo 生徒諸君! 心に緑のネッカチーフを (Attention Students! A Green Neckerchief for Your Hearts)	Japan	Mitsuo Kusakabe	Toho; Ashi Productions; Fuji TV	Traditional	Television special	Twenty sixth and final animated special produced for Fuji TV's "Nissei Family Special" program.	February 23, 1986	65 minutes
Skeletor's Revenge	United States	Bob Arkwright; Lou Kachivas; Ernie Schmidt; Gwen Wetzler	Filmation	Traditional	Direct-to-video; Compilation film	Compilation of earlier He-Man and the Masters of the Universe TV episodes – "Day of the Machines", "Trouble in Trolla" and "The Cat and the Spider", respectively.	?	45 minutes
Sophie's Place	United States	Larry Jordan	?	Experimental			July 7, 1986	90 minutes
Super Mario Bros.: The Great Mission to Rescue Princess Peach! スーパーマリオブラザーズ ピーチ姫救出大作戦！ (Sûpâ Mario Burazâzu.: Pîchi-hime kyushutsu dai sakusen!)	Japan	Masami Hata	Nintendo; Grouper Productions	Traditional	Theatrical	First film based on a video game overall.	July 20, 1986	61 minutes
Tato, nie bój się dentysty! Dad, Don't Be Afraid of the Dentist!	Poland	Zofia Ołdak	Studio Miniatur Filmowych	Stop motion/Live action	Theatrical		May 12, 1986	69 minutes
They Were Eleven; 11人いる! (Jûichi-nin iru!)	Japan	Tetsu Dezaki; Tsuneo Tominaga	Toho; Kitty Film	Traditional	Theatrical		November 1, 1986	91 minutes
The Three Musketeers	Australia		Burbank Films Australia	Traditional	Television film		October 4, 1986	54 minutes
Toki no Tabibito: Time Stranger 時空の旅人 (Toki no Tabibito)	Japan	Mori Masaki	Madhouse; Project Team Argos	Traditional			December 20, 1986	91 minutes
Touch: Sebangō no Nai Ace タッチ 背番号のないエース (Touch: Ace Without a Number on His Back)	Japan	Gisaburō Sugii	Group TAC	Traditional	Theatrical; Compilation film		April 12, 1986	93 minutes
Touch 2: Sayonara no Okurimono タッチ2 さよならの贈り物 (Touch 2: The Farewell Gift)	Japan	Gisaburō Sugii (chief director); Naoto Hashimoto	Group TAC	Traditional	Theatrical; Compilation film		December 13, 1986	81 minutes
The Transformers: The Movie	United States; Japan	Nelson Shin	Hasbro; Marvel Productions; Sunbow Productions; Toei Animation	Traditional	Theatrical| The final film for both Orson Welles, who died the year before its release, and Scatman Crothers, who died months after its release.		August 8, 1986	85 minutes
The Trapalhoes in the Tail of the Comet; Os Trapalhões no Rabo do Cometa	Brazil	Dedé Santana	Black & White & Color; Maurício de Sousa Produções; Renato Aragão Produções	Traditional			January 8, 1986	81 minutes
Urban Square – Kohaku no Tsuigeki アーバンスクウェア 琥珀の追撃 (Urban Square – In Pursuit of Amber)	Japan	Akira Nishimori	Bandai Visual; Network Koenji Studio	Traditional	Direct-to-video; OVA		November 28, 1986	56 minutes
Urusei Yatsura 4: Lum the Forever うる星やつら4 ラム・ザ・フォーエバー (Urusei Yatsura 4: Ramu za Fōebā)	Japan	Kazuo Yamazaki	Studio Deen	Traditional	Theatrical	Fourth feature in the Urusei Yatsura film series.	February 22, 1986	94 minutes
Valhalla; Valhalla	Denmark	Peter Madsen; Jeffrey J. Varab	Swan Film Production A/S; Asgaard Film ApS; Metronome Productions; Interpresse A/S; Palle Fogtdal A/S	Traditional	Theatrical		October 10, 1986	76 minutes
Voltron: Fleet of Doom	United States; Japan	Franklin Cofod	World Events Productions; Toei Animation	Traditional	Television special		September 10, 1986	46 minutes
Wanna-Be's ウォナビーズ	Japan	Yasuo Hasegawa	AIC; Artmic; Movic	Traditional	Direct-to-video; OVA		December 25, 1986	45 minutes
Windaria a. k. a. Once Upon a Time 童話めいた戦史ウインダリア (Dôwa meita senshi Windaria)	Japan	Kunihiko Yuyama	Idol; Kaname Productions; Studio Gallop	Traditional	Theatrical		July 19, 1986	101 minutes
When the Wind Blows	United Kingdom	Jimmy Murakami	Recorded Releasing	Traditional/Stop motion	Theatrical		October 24, 1986	84 minutes

== Highest-grossing animated films of the year ==
Rank	Title	Studio	Worldwide gross	Ref.
1	An American Tail	Sullivan Bluth Studios / Universal Studios	$84,542,002	
2	The Great Mouse Detective	Walt Disney Feature Animation	$38,625,550	
3	Laputa: Castle in the Sky	Studio Ghibli	$15,892,997	
4	Doraemon: Nobita and the Steel Troops	Asatsu / Toho	$13,114,000 (¥2,210,000,000)	
5	Care Bears Movie II: A New Generation	LBS Communications / Nelvana Limited	$12,000,000	
6	The Transformers: The Movie	Hasbro	$10,934,089	
7	Dragon Ball: Curse of the Blood Rubies	Toei Animation	$7,800,000 (¥1,250,000,000)	
8	The Adventures of the American Rabbit	Clubhouse Pictures / Fred Wolf Films	$1,268,443	

== See also ==
- List of animated television series of 1986
