= 1986 in anime =

The events of 1986 in anime.

== Accolades ==
- Ōfuji Noburō Award: Castle in the Sky

== Releases ==
Released	Title	Type	Director	Studio	Ref
January 6	New Robotan	TV series	Kenji Kodama, et al.	Tokyo Movie Shinsha	
January 10	Uchūsen Sagittarius	TV series	Kazuyoshi Yokota	Nippon Animation	
January 12	The Story of Pollyanna, Girl of Love	TV series	Kōzō Kuzuha	Nippon Animation	
January 19	Maple Town	TV series	Junichi Sato, Hiroshi Shidara	Toei Animation	
January 19	Maple Town Monogatari	Film	Junichi Sato, Hiroshi Shidara	Toei Animation	
January 21	Panzer World Galient	OVA series	Ryōsuke Takahashi	Nippon Sunrise	
February 1	Song Special 2: Curtain Call	OVA film	Kazunori Itō, Mochizuki Tomomichi	Studio Pierrot	
February 22	Urusei Yatsura 4: Lum the Forever	Film	Kazuo Yamazaki	Studio Deen	
February 26	Dragon Ball	TV series	Minoru Okazaki, Daisuke Nishio	Toei Animation	
March 1	Mobile Suit Gundam ZZ	TV series	Yoshiyuki Tomino	Nippon Sunrise	
March 7	Pastel Yumi, the Magic Idol	TV series	Akira Sugino	Studio Pierrot	
March 8	Fist of the North Star	Film	Toyoo Ashida	Toei Animation	
March 15	Arion	Film	Yoshikazu Yasuhiko	Sunrise	
March 15	Captain Tsubasa: Asu ni Mukatte Hashire	Film	Isamu Imakake	Tsuchida Productions	
March 15	Doraemon: Nobita and the Steel Troops	Film	Tsutomu Shibayama	Shin-Ei Animation	
March 21	Prefectural Earth Defense Force	OVA film	Keiji Hayakawa	Gallop	
March 26	Maison Ikkoku	TV series	Kazuo Yamazaki, Takashi Annō, Naoyuki Yoshinaga	Studio Deen	
April 7	Ginga: Nagareboshi Gin	TV series	Tomoharu Katsumata	Toei Animation	
April 12	Touch: Sebangō no Nai Ace	Film	Gisaburō Sugii	Group TAC	
April 16	Wonder Beat Scramble	TV series		Mushi Production	
April 25	Animated Classics of Japanese Literature	TV series		Nippon Animation	
April 21	Requiem for Victims	OVA	Seiji Okuda	Ashi Productions	
April	Saint Elmo – Hikari no Raihousha	TV film	Tomoharu Katsumata	Toei Animation	
April	Transformers: Scramble City	OVA	Yuji Endo	Toei Animation, Takara	
May 3	Hikari no Densetsu	TV series	Tomomi Mochizuki	Tatsunoko Productions	
May 10	Baribari Legend	OVA series	Nagayuki Toriumi, Satoshi Uemura	Studio Pierrot	
May 19	Sango-sho Densetsu: Aoi Umi no Erufii	TV film	Yoshio Kuroda	Nippon Animation	
May 21	Maris the Chojo	OVA film	Motosuke Takahashi	Studio Pierrot, Shogakukan Production	
May 25	Mahō no Star Magical Emi Finale! Finale!	OVA film		Studio Pierrot	
May 30	Megazone 23 - Part II	Film	Ichiro Itano	AIC, Artland, Tatsunoko	
June 14	Barefoot Gen 2	Film	Toshio Hirata	Nippon Sunrise	
June 21	Project A-ko	Film	Katsuhiko Nishijima	Soeishinsha, APPP	
June	Violence Jack: Harem Bomber	OVA film	Osamu Kamijo	Soei Shinsha, Ashi Production	
July 3	Machine Robo: Revenge of Cronos	TV series	Hiroshi Yoshida	Ashi Productions	
July 5	Armored Trooper VOTOMS: Big Battle	OVA film	Ryosuke Takahashi	Nippon Sunrise	
July 5	Chōjikū Romanesque Samy - Missing 99	OVA	Seiji Okuda, Hidemi Kubo	Aubec, Project Team Eikyuu Kikan	
July 5	Kizuoibito	OVA series	Toshio Takeuchi	Magic Bus	
July 12	Captain Tsubasa: Sekai Daikessen, Jr. World Cup	Film	Isamu Imakake	Tsuchida Productions	
July 12	High School! Kimengumi	Film	Makoto Moriwaki	Studio Comet	
July 14	Legend of Lyon Flare	OVA series	Yorihisa Uchida	Kusama Art Ltd.	
July 19	Amon Saga	OVA film	Shunji Ōga	Tohokushinsha Film Corporation	
July 19	Windaria	Film	Kunihiko Yuyama	Studio Gallop	
July 20	Super Mario Bros.: The Great Mission to Rescue Princess Peach!	Film	Masami Hata	Kyoto Animation	
July 26	Ai City	Film	Kōichi Mashimo	Toho, Movic, Ashi Productions	
July 26	Eternal Story	Film	Katsuhito Akiyama	AIC, ARTMIC	
July 28	Call Me Tonight	OVA short film	Tatsuya Okamoto	AIC	
August 2	Castle in the Sky	Film	Hayao Miyazaki	Studio Ghibli	
August 15	Yamataro Comes Back	OVA	Osamu Tezuka	Tezuka Productions	
September 10	Roots Search	OVA film			
September 15	Memorial Album	OVA film		Studio Deen	
September 21	Mahō no Star Magical Emi Semishigure	OVA film		Studio Pierrot	
October 3	Honey Bee in Toycomland	TV series		TMS Entertainment	
October 5	Anmitsu Hime: From Amakara Castle	TV series	Masami Anno	Studio Pierrot	
October 6	Bosco Adventure	TV series	Taku Sugiyama	Nippon Animation	
October 6	Oh! Family	TV series	Masamune Ochiai	Knack Productions	
October 6	The Wonderful Wizard of Oz	TV series	Naisho Tonogawa	Panmedia	
October 11	Saint Seiya	TV series	Kōzō Morishita, Kazuhito Kikuchi	Toei Animation	
October 14	Doteraman	TV series	Shinya Sadamitsu	Tatsunoko Production	
October 15	Ganbare, Kickers!	TV series	Akira Shigino	Studio Pierrot	
October 15	Mock & Sweet	TV series	Hiroyuki Yokoyama, Masahiko Fukutomi, Takajuki Kaneko	Japcon Mart	
October 21	Blue Comet SPT Layzner	OVA series	Ryōsuke Takahashi	Nippon Sunrise	
November 1	They Were Eleven	Film	Tetsu Dezaki, Tsuneo Tominaga	Kitty Film	
November 5	Heavy Metal L-Gaim	OVA series	Yoshiyuki Tomino	Nippon Sunrise	
November 28	Dirty Pair: Project Eden	Film	Kōichi Mashimo	Nippon Sunrise	
December 13	Grey: Digital Target	Film	Tetsu Dezaki	Magic Bus, Tokuma Japan Corp.	
December 13	Guyver: Out of Control	OVA film	Hiroshi Watanabe	Studio Wave	
December 13	Touch 2: Sayonara no Okurimono	Film	Naoto Hashimoto	Group TAC	
December 16	Outlanders	OVA film	Katsuhisa Yamada	AIC	
December 20	Dragon Ball: Curse of the Blood Rubies	Film	Daisuke Nishio	Toei Animation	
December 20	Phoenix: Ho-ō	Film	Rintaro	Madhouse, Tezuka Productions	
December 21	Toki no Tabibito -Time Stranger-	Film	Mori Masaki	Madhouse	
December 25	Wanna-Be's	OVA film	Yasuo Hasegawa	AIC, Artmic, Movic	
	Jūsenkitai Songs	OVA		Ashi Productions	
	Most Dangerous Soldier	OVA film	Hayato Ikeda	Studio Wave, Zero G-Room	
	My Favorite Fairy Tales	OVA series		Saban Productions	

== See also ==
- 1986 in animation
