= List of animated television series of 1986 =

A list of animated television series first aired in 1986.

Animated television series first aired in 1986
Title	Episodes	Country	Year	Channel	Technique	Notes
The Adventures of the Galaxy Rangers	65	United States	1986	First-run syndication	Traditional	
Auberle & Co. KG	26	West Germany	1986	ARD	Cut Out	
The Bluffers	13	Netherlands; United States	1986	AVRO	Traditional	
The Blunders	30	United Kingdom	1986	CITV	Traditional	
Cadichon	20	France	1986	Canal+	Traditional	
Calabash Brothers	13	China	1986–87	CCTV	Anime	
The Care Bears Family	49	Canada	1986–88	ABC	Traditional	
Centurions	65	United States	1986	first-run syndication	Traditional	
Defenders of the Earth	65	United States	1986	Syndication	Traditional	Based on various comic strip characters
Dennis the Menace	78	United States; France (season 1); Canada (season 2)	1986–88	Syndication (1986–87); CBS (1988)	Traditional	Version of Dennis the Menace.
Dick Spanner, P.I.	22	United Kingdom	1986–87	Channel 4	Stop-Motion	
The Flintstone Kids	36	United States	1986–87	ABC	Traditional	Spin-off of The Flintstones.
Foofur	26	United States	1986–87	NBC	Traditional	
G-Force: Guardians of Space	85	United States; Japan	1986	SuperStation WTBS	Traditional	
Galaxy High School	13	United States; Japan	1986	CBS	Traditional	
Ghayab Aya	10	India	1986	DD National	Traditional	
Ghostbusters	65	United States	1986	First-run syndication	Traditional	Spin-off of The Ghost Busters
The Glo Friends	26	United States	1986–87	Syndication	Traditional	Part of My Little Pony 'n Friends
Inhumanoids	13	United States	1986	Syndication	Traditional	First five episodes aired as part of Super Sunday
Janoschs Traumstunde	26	West Germany	1986–90	ARD	Traditional	
Jimbo and the Jet-Set	25	United Kingdom	1986–87	BBC One	Traditional	
Karate Kommandos	5	United States	1986	First-run syndication	Traditional	5 episode mini-series
Kideo TV	13	United States	1986–87	Syndication	Traditional	Compilation Series
Kissyfur	26	United States	1986–88	NBC	Traditional	
Lazer Tag Academy	13	United States	1986	NBC	Traditional	
Mondák a magyar történelemből	13	Hungary	1986	M1	Traditional	
MoonDreamers	16	United States	1986–87	Syndication	Traditional	Part of My Little Pony 'n Friends
My Little Pony (1986)	65	United States	1986–87	Syndication	Traditional	
The New Adventures of Jonny Quest	13	United States	1986–87	Syndication	Traditional	Spin-off of Jonny Quest
Pinny's House	13	United Kingdom	1986	BBC	Cut-Outs	
Popples (1986)	44	United States	1986–87	Syndication (Kideo TV)	Traditional	
Potato Head Kids	23	United States	1986–87	Syndication	Traditional	Part of My Little Pony 'n Friends
Pound Puppies (1986)	26	United States	1986–87	ABC	Traditional	
The Raggy Dolls	112	United Kingdom	1986–94	ITV (CITV)	Traditional	
Rambo: The Force of Freedom	65	United States	1986	First-run syndication	Traditional	Spin-off of First Blood
The Real Ghostbusters	140	United States	1986–91	ABC	Traditional	Spin-off of Ghostbusters
SilverHawks	65	United States	1986	Syndication	Traditional	
Teen Wolf	21	United States; Australia	1986–87	CBS	Traditional	
The Telebugs	86	United Kingdom	1986–87	CBS	Traditional	
The Trap Door	40	United Kingdom	1986	ITV (Children's ITV)	Stop-Motion	
Wildfire	13	United States	1986	CBS	Traditional	

Anime television series first aired in 1986
Title	Episodes	Country	Year	Notes
Animated Classics of Japanese Literature	34	Japan	1986–87	
Anmitsu Hime	51	Japan	1986–87	
Bosco Adventure	26	Japan	1986–87	
Doteraman	20	Japan	1986–87	
Dragon Ball	153	Japan	1986–89	
Ganbare, Kickers!	26	Japan	1986–87	
Hikari no Densetsu	19	Japan	1986	
Honey Bee in Toycomland	51	Japan	1986–87	
Machine Robo: Revenge of Cronos	47	Japan	1986–87	
Maison Ikkoku	96	Japan	1986–88	
Maple Town	52	Japan	1986–87	
Mobile Suit Gundam ZZ	47	Japan	1986–87	
Mock & Sweet	49	Japan	1986–87	
Oh! Family	26	Japan	1986–87	
Pastel Yumi, the Magic Idol	25	Japan	1986	
Robotan	33	Japan	1986	
Saint Seiya	114	Japan	1986–89	
Silver Fang -The Shooting Star Gin-	21	Japan	1986	
The Story of Pollyanna, Girl of Love	51	Japan	1986	
Uchūsen Sagittarius	77	Japan	1986–87	
Wonder Beat Scramble	26	Japan	1986	
The Wonderful Wizard of Oz	52	Japan	1986–87	

== See also ==
- List of animated feature films of 1986
- List of Japanese animation television series of 1986
