= List of Maple Town episodes =

Maple Town, originally titled Maple Town Stories (メイプルタウン物語, Maple Town Monogatari), is a Japanese animated television franchise created by Chifude Asakura. The series takes place in an utopian city populated by animal characters, among them Patty Rabbit and Bobby Bear. Episodes of the series originally aired on ABC in Japan from January 19, 1986, to December 27, 1987, and syndication and Nickelodeon in the U.S. between April 13 and June 23, 1987.

== Original series ==
The original Maple Town series aired from January 1986 to January 1987 on TV Asahi, spanning 52 episodes. In the U.S., the first ten episodes were shown in syndication in April 1987 as a test run, then 16 more episodes aired on Nickelodeon in May and June.

No.	Title	Director	Writer	Original air date (Japan)	U.S. air date
1	"Welcome to Maple Town"; Transliteration: "Kochira dōbutsu taun" (Japanese: こちら動物タウン)	Junichi Sato	Chifude Asakura	January 19, 1986	April 13, 1987
The Rabbit family moves into Maple Town. Patty befriends Bobby Bear as they work together to retrieve a stolen mail bag from Wilde Wolf.
2	"The Stolen Necklace"; Transliteration: "Nerawareta kubikazari" (Japanese: ねらわれた首飾り)	Takashi Kuoka	Chifude Asakura	January 26, 1986	April 14, 1987
On Patty's first day of school, Wilde Wolf steals Fanny Fox's necklace. As Bobby, Patty and Fanny get it back, Fanny no longer cares for showing off.
3	"Box Go Boom!"; Transliteration: "Kieta gin no saji" (Japanese: 消えた銀のさじ)	Junichi Sato	Chifude Asakura	February 2, 1986	April 15, 1987
Wilde Wolf swaps a package addressed to Bobby, containing a family heirloom with a bomb, but both packages get mixed up.
4	"The Greatest Gift of All"; Transliteration: "Horiateta takara mono" (Japanese: 掘り当てた宝もの)	Hiroshi Shidara	Shigeru Yanagawa	February 9, 1986	April 16, 1987
The Moles try to dig for treasure and Mayor Dandy Lion and Officer Barney Bull Dog got the trunk in basement.
5	"The Pot That Wouldn't Hold Water"; Transliteration: "Ubawareta nabe" (Japanese: うばわれたナベ)	Yukio Kaizawa	Tomoko Konparu	February 16, 1986	April 17, 1987
Wilde Wolf made a hole in Mr. Lodi Mouse's pot and he steals it to try and fix it.
6	"Medicine from Maple Mountain"; Transliteration: "Kowareta kusuribin" (Japanese: こわれた薬びん)	Yoshihiro Oka	Chifude Asakura	February 23, 1986	April 20, 1987
Danny Dog was using plant making medicine and Wilde Wolf and Bobby Bear hurt his arm.
7	"The Children's Forest Patrol"; Transliteration: "Mori no minarai keibitai" (Japanese: 森の見習い警備隊)	Takashi Kuoka	Shigeru Yanagawa	March 2, 1986	April 21, 1987
Patty, Bobby, Betty and Fanny form their own Forest Rangers scout causing some inconvenience for Wilde Wolf along the way.
8	"The Ransom of Maple Forest"; Transliteration: "Watashi no e wo mite!" (Japanese: わたしの絵を見て！)	Junichi Sato	Tomoko Konparu	March 9, 1986	April 22, 1987
Fanny Fox tries to show a picture of Frederick and Florence Fox. Fanny runs away with Wilde Wolf and Freddy Fox pays money in can. Wilde Wolf kidnaps Patty and Fanny in a sack, and Frederick Fox rescues Fanny.
9	"A Most Unlikely Heroine"; Transliteration: "Hiroin wa watashi" (Japanese: ヒロインはわたし)	Hiroshi Shidara	Keiji Kubota	March 16, 1986	April 23, 1987
Penny gets the heroine part for Sheriff Barney's play. Wilde Wolf also gets involved in the play by accident.
10	"The Prettiest Dress in Maple Town"; Transliteration: "Papa, kocchi muite" (Japanese: パパこっち向いて)	Yukio Kaizawa	Chifude Asakura	March 23, 1986	April 24, 1987
Suzy Squirrel is getting distressed her father's firmness, while Wilde Wolf tries to steal valuable fabric. Suzy and her father make up after a rescue from Wilde Wolf.
11	"The House Made of Love"; Transliteration: "Okashi no ie no yakusoku" (Japanese: お菓子の家の約束)	Yoshihiro Oka	Shigeru Yanagawa	March 30, 1986	May 19, 1987
While the Cat couple have disagreements, Wilde Wolf is suffering a cavity. Mr. Cat then works on his childhood promise to his wife.
12	"Teacher, Please Don't Go"; Transliteration: "Ikanaide! Sensei" (Japanese: 行かないで！先生)	Takashi Kuoka	Chifude Asakura	April 6, 1986	May 20, 1987
Miss Deer is leaving Maple Town with her grandmother. Wilde Wolf tries sabotage Miss Deer's stay, but is thwarted by Patty and her classmates.
13	"The Letter That Saved Mayor Dandy Lion"; Transliteration: "Ai wo yobu tegami" (Japanese: 愛を呼ぶ手紙)	Junichi Sato	Chifude Asakura	April 13, 1986	May 25, 1987
Mayor Lion catches a cold, and he writes a letter to his daughter Mrs. Francoise Lion.
14	"Father Still Knows Best"; Transliteration: "Tōsan arigatō" (Japanese: 父さんありがとう)	Hiroshi Shidara	Chifude Asakura	April 20, 1986	May 26, 1987
Sheriff Otto's son Heinrich comes to Maple Town.
15	"A Baby Comes to Maple Town"; Transliteration: "Haro! Akachan" (Japanese: ハロー！赤ちゃん)	Yukio Kaisawa	Keiko Maruo	April 27, 1986	May 27, 1987
Everyone thinks Mrs. Raccoon is having a baby. Roxie runs away thinking this not to be, but is surprised to find it is true.
16	"The Spirit of Twin Peaks"; Transliteration: "Usagi yama no kamisama" (Japanese: うさぎ山の神さま)	Yoshihiro Oka	Tomoko Komparu	May 4, 1986	June 1, 1987
17	"When Children Must Be Grown-Ups"; Transliteration: "Kodomo dake no machi" (Japanese: 子供だけの町)	Takashi Kuoka	Shigeru Yanagawa	May 11, 1986	June 2, 1987
On a special day where the children take charge of Maple Town, Patty looks after a very bad and bratty Kirby Cat. Kirby has a change of heart when he has to leave.
18	"A Love Letter to Miss Deer"; Transliteration: "Tanomareta koi no tegami" (Japanese: 頼まれた恋の手紙)	Junichi Sato	Chifude Asakura	May 18, 1986	June 3, 1987
19	"The Beaver Family's Swimming Hole"; Transliteration: "Biibaa ie no natsu" (Japanese: ビーバー家の夏)	Hiroshi Shidara	Keiko Maruo	May 25, 1986	June 8, 1987
20	"The Maple Town Children's Newspaper"; Transliteration: "Patei no kodomo shinbun" (Japanese: パティの子供新聞)	Takashi Kuoka	Shigeru Yanagawa	June 1, 1986	June 9, 1987
21	"The Mystery Man of Maple Town"; Transliteration: "Nigetekita kaizoku" (Japanese: 逃げてきた海賊)	Junichi Sato	Tomoko Konparu	June 8, 1986	June 10, 1987
22	"The Case of the Missing Candy"; Transliteration: "Kodomotachi no mujintō" (Japanese: 子供たちの無人島)	Yoshihiro Oka	Chifude Asakura	June 15, 1986	June 15, 1987
23	"The Forgotten Dream"; Transliteration: "Yume no wasuremono" (Japanese: 夢のわすれもの)	Yukio Kaizawa	Shigeru Yanagawa	June 22, 1986	June 16, 1987
Becky Bear is angry at Bobby, while Wilde Wolf discovers a haunted house.
24	"Friends of Maple Town"; Transliteration: "Yama kara kita tomodachi" (Japanese: 山から来た友だち)	Hiroshi Shidara	Tomoko Konparu	June 29, 1986	June 17, 1987
25	"Angels of the Valley"; Transliteration: "Tanima no tenshitachi" (Japanese: 谷間の天使たち)	Takashi Kuoka	Keiko Maruo	July 6, 1986	June 22, 1987
26	"The Witch's Castle"; Transliteration: "Majo no sumu oshiro" (Japanese: 魔女の住むお城)	Junichi Sato	Chifude Asakura	July 13, 1986	June 23, 1987
27	"Please Give Me a Shellfish!"; Transliteration: "Kaigara ni negai wo!" (Japanese: 貝がらに願いを！)	Yoshihiro Oka	Shigeru Yanagawa	July 20, 1986	N/A
28	"Lover's Blue Sea"; Transliteration: "Koibitotachi no aoi umi" (Japanese: 恋人たちの青い海)	Yorifusa Yamaguchi	Shigeru Yanagawa	July 27, 1986	N/A
29	"The Mysterious Piano"; Transliteration: "Fushigi na piano" (Japanese: ふしぎなピアノ)	Hiroshi Shidara	Keiko Maruo	August 3, 1986	N/A
30	"A Big Hospital"; Transliteration: "Byōin wa oosawagi" (Japanese: 病院は大さわぎ)	Takashi Kuoka	Keiko Maruo	August 10, 1986	N/A
31	"Welcome, Customers!"; Transliteration: "Yōkoso! Okyakusama" (Japanese: ようこそ！お客さま)	Junichi Sato	Tomoko Konparu	August 17, 1986	N/A
32	"I Want an Invasion!"; Transliteration: "Shōtaijō ga hoshii!" (Japanese: 招待状がほしい！)	Yukio Kaisawa	Shigeru Yanagawa	August 24, 1986	N/A
33	"Gretel's Love Story"; Transliteration: "Gureteru no koi uranai" (Japanese: グレテルの恋占い)	Yoshihiro Oka	Chifude Asakura	August 31, 1986	N/A
34	"Drowa's Sister"; Transliteration: "Tabi no shoujo dōra" (Japanese: 旅の少女ドーラ)	Hiroshi Shidara	Chifude Asakura	September 7, 1986	N/A
35	"Say Cheese!"; Transliteration: "Kinenshashin de chīzu!" (Japanese: 記念写真でチーズ!)	Takashi Kuoka	Yukiyo Mashiko	September 14, 1986	N/A
36	"How Fanny Found a Cardinal In a Cage"; Transliteration: "Akai tori mitsuketa!" (Japanese: 赤い鳥 見つけた!)	Junichi Sato	Keiko Maruo	September 21, 1986	N/A
Mr. Badger helps the sick baby maple birds.
37	"The Violin of Yearning"; Transliteration: "Akogare no baiorin" (Japanese: 憧れのバイオリン)	Yukio Kaizawa	Tomoko Konparu	September 28, 1986	N/A
38	"The Wedding"; Transliteration: "Kekkonshiki wa omakase" (Japanese: 結婚式はおまかせ)	Yoshihiro Oka	Shigeru Yanagawa	October 5, 1986	N/A
39	"Meet Fanny"; Transliteration: "Daiana no namida" (Japanese: ダイアナのなみだ)	Hiroshi Shidara	Shigeru Yanagawa	October 12, 1986	N/A
40	"A Girl in a Secret House"; Transliteration: "Himitsu no ie no onna no ko" (Japanese: 秘密の家の女の子)	Takashi Kuoka	Chifude Asakura	October 19, 1986	N/A
41	"My Pen Friend"; Transliteration: "Watashi no penfurendo" (Japanese: 私のペンフレンド)	Junichi Sato	Keiko Maruo	October 26, 1986	N/A
42	"Jasmine Party at Night"; Transliteration: "Jasumin matsuri no yoru" (Japanese: ジャスミン祭の夜)	Yukio Kaisawa	Yukiyo Mashiko	November 2, 1986	N/A
43	"A Letter That Reached a Star"; Transliteration: "Hoshi ni todoita tegami" (Japanese: 星にとどいた手紙)	Hiroyuki Kakudo	Shigeru Yanagawa	November 9, 1986	N/A
44	"A Gift of Mufflers"; Transliteration: "Mafurâ no okurimono" (Japanese: マフラーの贈り物)	Yoshihiro Oka	Keiko Maruo	November 16, 1986	N/A
45	"Snow on The Mountain House"; Transliteration: "Yama no ie wa mou fuyu" (Japanese: 山の家はもう冬)	Hiroshi Shidara	Tomoko Konparu	November 23, 1986	N/A
46	"Ice Skating"; Transliteration: "Mizuumi no sukêto kyousou" (Japanese: 湖のスケート競走)	Takashi Kuoka	Yukiyo Mashiko	November 30, 1986	N/A
47	"Maybe Goddess?"; Transliteration: "Moshikashite megamisama?" (Japanese: もしかして女神様?)	Junichi Sato	Shigeru Yanagawa	December 7, 1986	N/A
48	"Open That Safe Vault!"; Transliteration: "Sono kinko wo akete!" (Japanese: その金庫をあけて!)	Yukio Kaisawa	Chifude Asakura	December 14, 1986	N/A
A mysterious stranger discovers the safe timer in the foxes' guest house.
49	"Twin Babies"; Transliteration: "Futago no akachan" (Japanese: ふたごの赤ちゃん)	Hiroyuki Kakudo	Keiko Maruo	December 21, 1986	N/A
50	"Happy New Year with a Cake!"; Transliteration: "Kêki de shinnen wo!" (Japanese: ケーキで新年を!)	Yoshihiro Oka	Shigeru Yanagawa	December 28, 1986	N/A
51	"Aunt of the South Town"; Transliteration: "Minami no machi no obasan" (Japanese: 南の町のおばさん)	Takashi Kuoka	Tomoko Konparu	January 4, 1987	N/A
52	"Patty's Departure"; Transliteration: "Patei no tabidachi" (Japanese: パティの旅立ち)	Junichi Sato	Chifude Asakura	January 11, 1987	N/A

== Palm Town ==
A second TV series, New Maple Town Story: Palm Town Chapter (新メイプルタウン物語-パームタウン編), aired in Japan during 1987. At the end of the first TV series, Patty left for Palm Town with her Aunt Jane. The second series picks up after that, with Patty living in Palm Town with Jane and her husband George, who run the Pika Clinic. The entire cast of the original series, with the exception of Patty, is absent although they do make cameo appearances.

The series lasted for 50 episodes, the last 12 of which were actually 6 two-part episodes (resulting in the common incorrect tally of 44).

No.	Title	Director	Writer	Original air date
1	"Down South is a New Town"; Transliteration: "Minami no kuni no atarashi i machi" (Japanese: 南の国の新しい町)	Hiroshi Shidara	Chifude Asakura	January 18, 1987
Patty's Aunt Jane takes her to Palm Town. Patty and her newfound friend Rolley are kidnapped by Gunter and Big Bro but are able to outwit them and return safely to their families.
2	"Peter's Jealousy"; Transliteration: "Patei nanka kirai!" (Japanese: パティなんか嫌い!)	Yukio Kaisawa	Tomoko Konparu	January 25, 1987
Rolley holds a welcome party for Patti, making her brother Peter jealous. Gunter and Big Bro take advantage of Peter to steal ice-cream from the Cockers, but Peter helps Patti and Rolley to stop them.
3	"The Auto Designer"; Transliteration: "Yume wo noseta jidousha" (Japanese: 夢をのせた自動車)	Yasuo Yamayoshi	Shigeru Yanagawa	February 1, 1987
Joey's father is trying hard to invent a revolutionary car for Cordon Motors. With support from his family and colleague Backy, Joey manages to satisfy the Cordon entrepreneur.
4	"I Want to Become a Star"; Transliteration: "Sutâ ni naritai!" (Japanese: スターになりたい！)	Yoshihiro Oka	Keiko Maruo	February 8, 1987
After a disappointing trip to the cinema, Sheila is chosen to be a movie star, but the show biz turns out to be difficult due to the director's demands, but her stardom pays off.
5	"Medal of Tin"; Transliteration: "Buriki no kunshou" (Japanese: ブリキの勲章)	Takashi Kuoka	Yukiyo Masuko	February 15, 1987
As Charlie Sheep struggles to keep his popcorn sales going, Big Bro and Gunter steal his prized medal, but Charlie's granddaughter Sisi gets it back and decides to help her grandparents from now on.
6	"That Cheating Cuckoo"; Transliteration: "Oryouri wa dame yo!" (Japanese: お料理はダメよ！)	Junichi Sato	Chifude Asakura	February 22, 1987
Everyone in the Pika Clinic is busy today, so Patti and Rolley help out, but Big Bro and Gunter complicate things when they try to get some food from the clinic.
7	"Maple Town Friends"; Transliteration: "Okoranaide Bobî" (Japanese: 怒らないでボビー)	Hiroshi Shidara	Shigeru Yanagawa	March 1, 1987
Bobby and his family come to visit Palm Town. Bobby feels homesick, while Big Bro and Gunter house sit in a private mansion with Bobby's little brothers.
8	"The Magic Box"; Transliteration: "Himitsu no karakuri hako" (Japanese: 秘密のカラクリ箱)	Yukio Kaisawa	Chifude Asakura	March 8, 1987
Patti finds Uncle George's special box. When she loses it, she attempts to retrieve it without her uncle knowing, while Big Bro and Gunter try to swipe it for themselves.
9	"The Lighthouse in the Storm"; Transliteration: "Arashi no naka no toudai" (Japanese: あらしの中の灯台)	Yasuo Yamayoshi	Keiko Maruo	March 15, 1987
Patti and her friends visit the lighthouse, but a big storm traps them inside along with Big Bro and Gunter. When the storm passes, the children are rescued by their parents.
10	"The Golden Valley"; Transliteration: "Rakkî tani no shounen" (Japanese: ラッキー谷の少年)	Yoshihiro Oka	Yukiyo Mashiko	March 22, 1987
Patti goes with Rolley's family to Yellow River Valley. Patti and Rolley befriend the motherless wolf boy Jojo, while Big Bro and Gunter try to rob his father's gold stash.
11	"Jimmy is back" Transliteration: "Kaette kita jimî" (Japanese: 帰ってきたジミー)	Takashi Kuoka	Tomoko Konparu	March 29, 1987
Rolley meets her old friend Jimmy. Jimmy is on the verge of stealing the Cockers' antique vase to get back his precious flute, but instead stops Big Bro and Gunter from stealing it.
12	"Moving is Fun"; Transliteration: "Hikkoshi wa tanoshiku" (Japanese: 引っ越しは楽しく)	Hiroyuki Kakudo	Shigeru Yanagawa	April 5, 1987
Backy has decided to move house. Big Bro and Gunter masquerade as estate agents to swindle Backy's friend Jessica, but Backy builds a mobile house.
13	"The Spy"; Transliteration: "Ano hito ha supai?!" (Japanese: あの人はスパイ?!)	Junichi Sato	Chifude Asakura	April 12, 1987
Patty and Rolley spy on a suspicious-looking photographer named Jim Fisher. They find out that he is in fact a photographer for the tourism industry.
14	"An airplane full of old friends" Transliteration: "Sora kara no okyakusama" (Japanese: 空からのお客さま)	Hiroshi Shidara	Shigeru Yanagawa	April 19, 1987
During a visit by Patti's friends from Maple Town, Fanny becomes pretty bossy and takes Rolley's necklace, which Gunter and Big Bro con her out of. Rolley helps Fanny get it back and Fanny makes up with her friends.
15	"Secret treasure" Transliteration: "Himitsuno takara mono" (Japanese: ひみつの宝もの)	Hiroyuki Eikiryu	Keiko Maruo	April 26, 1987
Patti and her friends explore the Cockers' attic for a hidden treasure. A scuffle with Gunter and Big Bro reveals a stash of gold coins and another one with Parabura reveals an old photo.
16	"The Church on the Hill"; Transliteration: "Oka no ueno kyoukai" (Japanese: 丘の上の教会)	Eikichi Takahashi	Yukiyo Mashiko	May 3, 1987
During a drive trip, Patti and her friends meet Elliot, who is in love with Lucy and wants to arrange a marriage. Elliot's father disapproves until Lucy helps him recover from a car crash.
17	"Rainbow-colored dress" Transliteration: "Nijiiro no doresu" (Japanese: 虹色のドレス)	Yoshihiro Oka	Chifude Asakura	May 10, 1987
Sisi Sheep is having trouble preparing for a dress-making competition. Patti, Rolley and Remi help out by creating a patchwork dress of many colours.
18	"The Magical Lamp"; Transliteration: "Mahou no ranpu" (Japanese: 魔法のランプ)	Takashi Kuoka	Tomoko Konparu	May 17, 1987
Rolley and Patti purchase a lamp. Seeing the two girls getting lucky, Gunter and Big Bro steal it, believing it is magic. After a long chase, the lamp is lost.
19	"Skating is Fun"; Transliteration: "Doki doki sukêto" (Japanese: どきどきスケート)	Hiroyuki Kakudo	Shigeru Yanagawa	May 24, 1987
Remi learns to skate with Patti's friends, but her father thinks it is not safe. Gunter and Big Bro invent their own safety skates to compete against regular ones.
20	"Rose perfume" Transliteration: "Akai bara no kousui" (Japanese: 赤いバラの香水)	Hiromitsu Negishi	Chifude Asakura	May 31, 1987
Patti and Rolley visit Maple Town. With Bobby they make a wonderful perfume while Wilde Wolf stalks them, then tries to steal the perfume, but Patti outwits him and she happily unites with her family.
21	"The Medallion Of Love"; Transliteration: "Ai no pendanto" (Japanese: 愛のペンダント)	Hiroyuki Kakudo	Keiko Maruo	June 7, 1987
Rolley and Patti meet Relyo who has a stolen medallion. They convince him to return the medallion to the jeweler as Gunter and Big Bro try to steal the medallion for themselves.
22	"Regards baby" Transliteration: "Yoroshiku akachan" (Japanese: よろしく赤ちゃん)	Hiroyuki Eikiryu	Tomoko Konparu	June 14, 1987
23	"The town of Nowhere"; Transliteration: "Daremo inai machi he" (Japanese: 誰もいない町へ)	Eikichi Takahashi	Yukiyo Mashiko	June 21, 1987
24	"Patty goes to the amusement park" Transliteration: "Watashi no yuuenchi" (Japanese: わたしの遊園地)	Yoshihiro Oka	Shigeru Yanagawa	June 28, 1987
25	"I wanna go home!" Transliteration: "Ouchi ni kaeritai" (Japanese: おうちに帰りたい)	Takashi Kuoka	Chifude Asakura	July 5, 1987
26	"New Friends"; Transliteration: "Atarashii otomodachi" (Japanese: 新しいお友だち)	Junichi Sato	Keiko Maruo	July 12, 1987
27	"Doctor who came" Transliteration: "Kidotta dokutâ" (Japanese: 気どったドクター)	Hiromitsu Negishi	Tomoko Konparu	July 19, 1987
28	"The Store will be closed today?!" Transliteration: "Honjitsu kyuushin dêsu" (Japanese: 本日休診でーす)	Hiroyuki Kakudo	Chifude Asakura	July 26, 1987
29	"Let's go to that island" Transliteration: "Ano shima e ikou!" (Japanese: あの島へ行こう！)	Yasuo Yamayoshi	Keiko Maruo	August 2, 1987
30	"Tennis at the plateau" Transliteration: "Kougen de tenisu!" (Japanese: 高原でテニス！)	Hiroyuki Eikiryu	Yukiyo Mashiko	August 9, 1987
31	"Sea and wind race" Transliteration: "Umi to kaze no rêsu" (Japanese: 海と風のレース)	Yoshihiro Oka; Hiroyuki Kakudo	Tomoko Konparu	August 16, 1987
32	"We detective" Transliteration: "Watashitachi tantei yo" (Japanese: わたしたち探偵ョ)	Takashi Kuoka	Chifude Asakura	August 23, 1987
33	"The teacher is a big star" Transliteration: "Sensei ha dai sutâ!" (Japanese: 先生は大スター！)	Junichi Sato	Shigeru Yanagawa	August 30, 1987
34	"Dream wedding" Transliteration: "Yume no uedeingu" (Japanese: 夢のウェディング)	Hiromitsu Negishi	Chifude Asakura	September 6, 1987
35	"Princess of rainbow country" Transliteration: "Niji no kuni no ohimesama" (Japanese: 虹の国のお姫さま)	Hiroyuki Kakudo	Yukiyo Mashiko	September 13, 1987
36	"Hello with a microphone" Transliteration: "Maiku de harô!" (Japanese: マイクでハロー！)	Yasuo Yamayoshi	Tomoko Konparu	September 20, 1987
37	"Two people's ferris wheel" Transliteration: "Futari no kanransha" (Japanese: 二人のかんらん車)	Yoshihiro Oka	Shigeru Yanagawa	September 27, 1987
38	"When the cosmos bloom" Transliteration: "Kosumosu no saku toki" (Japanese: コスモスの咲く時)	Takashi Kuoka	Keiko Maruo	October 4, 1987
39–40	"What flower is this flower?" Transliteration: "Kono hana wa nanno hana!?" (Japanese: この花は何の花!?)	Junichi Sato	Shigeru Yanagawa	October 11, 1987 (part 1); October 18, 1987 (part 1)
41–42	"Two quarrels" Transliteration: "Kenka shita futari" (Japanese: けんかした二人)	Yasuo Yamayoshi	Yukiyo Mashiko	October 25, 1987 (part 1); November 1, 1987 (part 2)
43–44	"Chain watches" Transliteration: "Kusari no tsuita tokei" (Japanese: 鎖のついた時計)	Hiroyuki Kakudo	Chifude Asakura	November 8, 1987 (part 1); November 15, 1987 (part 2)
45–46	"Autumn travelers" Transliteration: "Aki no tabibito tachi" (Japanese: 秋の旅人たち)	Takashi Kuoka	Keiko Maruo	November 22, 1987 (part 1); November 29, 1987 (part 2)
47–48	"A girl with a blue ribbon" Transliteration: "Aoi ribon no shoujo" (Japanese: 青いリボンの少女)	Yasuo Yamaguchi	Yukiyo Mashiko	December 6, 1987 (part 1); December 13, 1987 (part 2)
49–50	"Goodbye South Town"; Transliteration: "Sayonara minami no kuni" (Japanese: さようなら南の国)	Yoshihiro Oka	Chifude Asakura	December 20, 1987 (part 1); December 27, 1987 (part 2)
