= List of Hikari no Densetsu episodes =

Nineteen episodes were produced for the Legend of Light anime series, which was canceled before completing the standard 26-episode run. The titles for the episode differ from version to version. For example: in the French version the title of the first episode is "Cynthia" which is the name given to Hikari in the French version, but when it comes to the Italian version the name of the first episode is "La speranza della ginnastica ritmica" (The hope of rhythmic gymnastics).

== Episode list ==
No.	Title	Original release date
1	"I want to chase ... My rhythmic gymnastics." Transliteration: "Oikakete Mitai ... Watashi no Shintaisō" (Japanese: 追いかけてみたい ... 私の新体操)	3 May 1986
2	"Don't tear, ribbon! Reach ... for love." Transliteration: "Kirenai de Ribon! Koi ni ... Todoke" (Japanese: 切れないでリボン! 恋に ... とどけ)	10 May 1986
3	"Is it alright to like you?" Transliteration: "Suki ni Natte mo Ii desu ka?" (Japanese: 好きになってもいいですか)	15 May 1986
4	"Season of affections, I want to sing a love song." Transliteration: "Kataomoi no Kisetsu·Rabusongu ga Utaitai" (Japanese: 片想いの季節·ラブソングが歌いたい)	24 May 1986
5	"Opening ceremony! I want your support." Transliteration: "Zenchū Taikai Kaimaku! Watashi o Sasaete Ite Hoshī" (Japanese: 全中大会開幕! 私をささえていてほしい)	31 May 1986
6	"Resurrection of the Queen! There is only one target." Transliteration: "Yomigaere Joō! Tāhetto wa Hitori" (Japanese: よみがえれ女王! ターゲットはひとり)	7 June 1986
7	"If you fly towards your goal." Transliteration: "Akogare ni Mukatte Tobetara" (Japanese: あこがれに向かって飛べたら)	14 June 1986
8	"The continuing summer road to tomorrow." Transliteration: "Ashita e to Tsuzuku Natsuiro no Matsuri" (Japanese: 明日へと続く夏色の道)	21 June 1986
9	"Maria appears! Who is the one who is chasing?" Transliteration: "Maria Tōjō! Dare ka o Itsumo Oikakete" (Japanese: マリア登場! 誰かをいつも追いかけて)	28 June 1986
10	"I want to see it further." Transliteration: "Motto Tōku o Mitsumetai" (Japanese: もっと遠くを見つめたい)	5 July 1986
11	"I no longer yearn for yesterday's smile." Transliteration: "Kinō no Egao wa Mō Hoshikunai" (Japanese: 昨日の笑顔は もうほしくない)	12 July 1986
12	"Retrieve the dream that has been forgotten." Transliteration: "Oki Wasureta Yume o Torimodose" (Japanese: 置き忘れた夢を 取り戻せ)	19 July 1986
13	"Heart-pumping moment at the baths!? The school trip which creates a stir in the heart" Transliteration: "Ofuro de Dokkiri!? Munasawagi no Shūgaku Ryokū" (Japanese: お風呂でドッキリ!? 胸さわぎの修学旅行)	2 August 1986
14	"Till we understand." Transliteration: "Itsu ka Wakari Aeru Toki made" (Japanese: いつかわかりあえる時まで)	16 August 1986
15	"The same dream, the two rivals." Transliteration: "Miru Yume mo Onaji·Futari wa Raibaru" (Japanese: 見る夢も同じ·二人はライバル)	23 August 1986
16	"Unable to transcend! The passport to glory." Transliteration: "Watasenai! Eikō e no Pasupōto" (Japanese: 渡せない! 栄光へのパスポート)	30 August 1986
17	"Please stop time, overcome this moment!" Transliteration: "Jikan yo Tomare·Kono Isshun ni Kakeru!" (Japanese: 時間よとまれ・この一瞬にかける!)	6 September 1986
18	"Overcome the shaking desire." Transliteration: "Yureru Omoi o Uketomete" (Japanese: ゆれる想いを受けとめて)	13 September 1986
19	"Please give me the strength to witness my dream." Transliteration: "Yumemiru Chikara o Watashi ni Kudasai" (Japanese: 夢みる力をわたしにください)	20 September 1986
