= Yoshihisa Tagami =

Japanese manga artist

Yoshihisa Tagami (田上喜久 Tagami Yoshihisa, usually written in hiragana たがみ よしひさ) is a Japanese manga artist.

Tagami was born on December 9, 1958, in Komoro, Nagano. He was the older brother of another manga artist, Iku Oyamada, who died in 2016. In 1978, Tagami received an Honorable Mention of the Shogakukan Manga Award in the Newcomer category for his manga Zashikiwarashi, which would become his first published manga in the January 10, 1979 issue of Shogakukan's Big Comic magazine.

== Early manga ==
Tagami's first manga published as a professional manga artist include Karuizawa Syndrome (軽井沢シンドローム), which ran in Big Comic Spirits from 1980 to 1985, and My Name is Wolf (我が名は狼, indicated by furigana to be read as waga na wa urufu), serialised in Play Comic by Akita Shoten in 1983.

== Grey ==
Grey is a science fiction manga in a post-apocalyptic, dystopian setting. It was originally serialised in Monthly Shōnen Captain from January 1985 - December 1986. Thanks to its early translation into English (Viz 1988–1989), Grey is Tagami's best known manga abroad.

== Horobi ==
滅日 (Horobi, literally "day of ruin"), originally serialised in Shōnen Captain from 1987 to 1990, was also published by Viz in English from 1990 to 1991. It is an occult horror story set in present-day Japan in which two university assistants face supernatural creatures and sinister cults. Horobi has been described as more sophisticated and mature than Grey.

== Frontier Line ==
Frontier Line (フロンティア ライン), originally published by Gakken in Comic Nora magazine from 1987 to 1988, was the third of Tagami's manga to be published in English, by Central Park Media in seven issues from 1999 to 2000. Each of the six chapters contains a mecha science-fiction story.

== Later manga ==
Tagami continues to make manga to this day. His more recent works include the martial arts story Fighter (ファイター), the mecha manga Metal Hunters D (メタル・ハンターズD), and the Western Pepper (ペッパー). Tagami also contributed to the Black Jack tribute manga Black Jack Alive (ブラック・ジャックALIVE).

== Anime ==
Two of Tagami's manga have been adapted into anime films: Grey: Digital Target (1986) and Karuizawa Syndrome (1986). Tagami was also character designer on another anime, Chō Kōsoku Galvion, a series aired in 1984.
