= The Three Musketeers (1986 film) =

- Screenshot from the opening title.
- Based on: The Three Musketeers by Alexandre Dumas
- Written by: Keith Dewhurst
- Directed by: Geoff Collins
- Starring: Ivar Kants (D'Artagnan); Noel Ferrier (Cardinal Richelieu); Kate Fitzpatrick (Milady)
- Music by: Sharon Calcraft
- Country of origin: Australia
- Original language: English

Production
- Producer: Tim Brooke-Hunt
- Editors: Peter Jennings >Caroline Neave
- Running time: 54 minutes
- Production companies: Burbank Films Australia; Palm Studios (stereo sound mixing)

Original release
- Release: 4 October 1986

The Three Musketeers is a 1986 Australian made-for-television animated adventure film from Burbank Films Australia. It is based on Alexandre Dumas's classic 1844 French novel, The Three Musketeers, and was adapted by Keith Dewhurst. It was produced by Tim Brooke-Hunt and featured original music by Sharon Calcraft.

Although chronologically the story is followed in Burbank's The Man in the Iron Mask, the latter film was released a year before The Three Musketeers. The copyright for the film is now owned by Pulse Distribution and Entertainment and administered by digital rights management firm NuTech Digital.

This is the only time in any Burbank production that the characters break the fourth wall. Now and then, the characters suddenly address the audience as if they were in the scene with them.

In 1999, the film was re-released on DVD by Digital Versatile Disc Ltd. Company, with a 5.1 soundtrack and interactive trivia game.

== Plot ==
In France during the mid-17th century, Cardinal Richelieu receives a visit from the despicably charming young woman, Milady de Winter. Milady brings the Cardinal information regarding the notorious affair between Anne of Austria, the Queen of France, and the English George Villiers, 1st Duke of Buckingham. Outside their window, the Queen's seamstress, Constance Bonacieux, stands watching the conversation between the two characters, when she is attacked by the Comte de Rochefort, one of the Cardinal's loyal men. She is rescued by the young musketeer D'Artagnan and taken away to his abode, where Constance briefly explains her troubles and asks for D'Artagnan's help.

Cardinal Richelieu, wanting to convince King Louis XIII that his wife, Anne, is unfaithful to him and in love with the Duke of Buckingham, suggests that he should ask his wife to wear the diamond studs he had given her for an upcoming ball. The Queen, shocked and dismayed, confesses to Constance that she had sent the diamonds to the Duke of Buckingham, and her confidant goes to D'Artagnan for help. With the help of his companions, three of the finest musketeers in France, Athos, Porthos and Aramis, D'Artagnan begin their journey to England, and hope to seek the Duke himself, so that they recover the diamonds and restore the Queen's honour.

Rochefort, having spied on Constance and the musketeers, is ordered by the Cardinal to stop them. Different groups of the Cardinal's men manage to take down the musketeers; Porthos is caught in a fight in an inn, Aramis is shot by gunmen and Athos is fought in another inn by ruffians disguising as customers and an innkeeper. D'Artagnan escapes the ambushes, and after defeating Rochefort in a duel on the harbour over a boarding pass, successfully travels to England. Although two studs are missing when D'Artagnan receives them from the Duke, suspected to have been stolen by Milady, two new studs are made in their place, just in time for the ball. The King's faith in the Queen is reinstated, infuriating the Cardinal, and a display of ballet and fireworks is shown to celebrate.

Still, when all problems seem overcome, the English Duke of Buckingham plans to invade France, remove King Louis XIII and marry the Queen; on the other hand, Cardinal Richelieu and Milady want revenge on D'Artagnan and Buckingham. Milady orders Rochefort to kidnap Constance Bonacieux, and when D'Artagnan learns this he sets off to rescue her. Milady is captured by Buckingham in England, and orders John Felton to guard her. Felton falls in love with Milady; she seduces him and asks him to murder the Duke, which he does. Though she believes herself safe at a convent in Béthune, Constance receives a visit from her supposed benefactor, Milady de Winter, who poisons her; D'Artagnan arrives at the scene and she dies in his arms. Together with Athos, Porthos, Aramis and Milady's old enemy, the executioner of Lille, D'Artagnan corners Milady at a refuge in Armentières. She is captured and sentenced to die for her crimes; Milady is then revealed to be Athos' own wife and that the executioner had once branded her with the Fleur-de-lis symbol. The villains defeated and the country's honour restored, the four companions return to their homeland mourning the lives lost but cheering for their triumphs.

== Cast ==
- Ivar Kants as D'Artagnan
- Noel Ferrier as Cardinal Richelieu
- Kate Fitzpatrick as Milady de Winter
- Tina Bursill
- Anna Volska
- Tim Elston
- Phillip Hinton
- Andrew Lewis
- Keith Robinson
- George Stephenson
