= Tsuchida Production =

Japanese animation studio

Tsuchida Production Co., Ltd.
- Native name: 株式会社土田プロダクション
- Romanized name: Kabushiki-gaisha Tsuchida Purodakushon
- Founded: 1976
- Founder: Osamu Tsuchida
- Defunct: 1986
- Fate: Bankruptcy
- Successor: Studio Comet
- Products: Captain Tsubasa

Tsuchida Production (土田(つちだ)プロダクション, Tsuchida Purodakushon) was an anime production company in Japan.

After Osamu Tsuchida (originally of Hōsō Dōga Seisaku) left Studio Yuni (not to be confused with the anime background art company of the same name), he founded Tsuchida Production in 1976 to do animation, production, finish animation, and other contract work related to the production of anime. The company became well known after working on Captain Tsubasa in 1983. When the Japanese economy went into a depression in the mid-1980s, however, Tsuchida Production collapsed into bankruptcy in July 1986 after being unable to reimburse its investors and various toy manufacturers with which it was working. Some of the employees went on to form Studio Comet.

== Projects ==
Projects are listed chronologically:

- Dokaben (1976–1979, contracted by Nippon Animation)
- Yakyūkyō no Uta (1977–1979, contracted by Nippon Animation)
- Kagaku Bōkentai Tansā 5 (1979–1980, contracted by Sunrise)
- Ojamanga Yamada-kun (1980–1982)
- Manga Kotowaza Jiten (1980–1982)
- Ganbare Gonbe (1980)
- Game Center Arashi (1982, contracted by Shin-Ei Animation)
- Rainbowman (1982–1983)
- Sasuga no Sarutobi (1982–1984)
- Manga Nihonshi (1982–1984)
- Captain Tsubasa (1983–1986)
- Kuroi Ame ni Utarete (1984)
- Ashita Tenki ni Naare (1984–1985)
- Rampoo (1984)
- Chūhai Lemon Love30S (1985)
- Bakuhatsu Miracle Nekketsu Genki! Isami (1985–1986)
- Bakuhatsu Miracle Nekketsu Genki! Isami: Mega Robot Ganbarer (1986)
- High School! Kimengumi (1985–1987, through episode 7, episodes 8-26 were done by Gallop, with all episodes after 9 being produced by Studio Comet)

== Notable former employees ==
- Hajime Watanabe
- Hideki Okamoto
- Hiroshi Ogawa
- Yoshitaka Koyama
- Shin Misawa
- Kōji Beppu (went on to Gallop)
- Tomohisa Iizuka (founder of Studio Fantasia)
