= Kidnapped (1986 film) =

- Directed by: Geoff Collins
- Written by: Leonard Lee, Robert Louis Stevenson (novel)
- Produced by: Tim Brooke-Hunt, Roz Phillips, Tom Stacey
- Edited by: Peter Jennings; Caroline Neave
- Music by: Mark Isaacs, Tom Price
- Distributed by: Burbank Films Australia
- Release date: 1986
- Running time: 55 minutes
- Language: English

Kidnapped is a 1986 Australian animated historical drama film directed by Geoff Collins. The film is based on the 1886 novel Kidnapped by author Robert Louis Stevenson.

A region free collectors edition of the film was released on DVD in 1999; the film was also remastered for this release.
