= Ratty (film) =

Råttis
- Directed by: Lennart Gustafsson
- Written by: Lennart Gustafsson
- Release date: 19 December 1986
- Running time: 84 minutes
- Country: Sweden
- Language: Swedish

Ratty (Swedish: Råttis) is a 1986 Swedish animated feature film directed by Lennart Gustafsson about rats experiencing young love. The film features several song numbers and is on the border to what could be called a musical.

It was the fifth Swedish animated feature film to ever be released, not counting Per Åhlin's early films that were only partly animated.

== Plot ==
Ratty is the oldest son in a rat family that consists of a mother (who spends most of her time vacuum cleaning), a father (who is building some strange vehicle in the basement), a grandfather (who most of the time walks around saying "Sure, sure!"), and then Ratty has a whole bunch of siblings. One day Ratty meets Rosetta and falls in love. But how serious is it from Rosetta's part? She, who one day can be ready to leave Ratty after winning a trip, and the next day can ride with the leader of the motorcycle gang to the rat club "Ratz."

== Reception ==
The film met mixed reviews in the Swedish press. It was praised for the amount of detail and its distinguished style, but criticized for lacking in dramatic pulse and energy.
