= Grey (manga) =

1985–1987 manga by Yoshihisa Tagami

- The cover of the first volume of Grey
- Genre: Dystopia, Sci-fi
- Manga
- Written by: Yoshihisa Tagami
- Published by: Tokuma Shoten
- English publisher: NA: Viz Media
- Magazine: Monthly Shōnen Captain
- Original run: 1985 – 1987
- Volumes: 3
- Anime film

Grey: Digital Target
- Directed by: Satoshi Dezaki
- Produced by: Seiichi Sakamoto
- Written by: Satoshi Dezaki; Yasushi Hirano; Kazumi Koide
- Music by: Gorō Ōmi
- Studio: Ashi Productions
- Released: December 13, 1986
- Runtime: 73 minutes

Grey (stylized as GREY) is a Japanese science fiction manga created by Yoshihisa Tagami that was published in the 1980s. It has also been adapted into an animated feature film under the title Grey: Digital Target.

== Premise ==
The world is covered in wastelands that are dotted with numbered "Towns". All Towns are supervised by computers called "Little Mamas" (nodes connected to the world governing super-computer called "Big Mama"); the underprivileged live in the slums and are referred to as "People". One can only become one of the privileged "Citizens" by joining the army and fighting the other Towns' forces, as the Towns are continually at war with one another. Soldier Grey, on track to become a Citizen, earns the nickname "Grey Death" for his tenacity on the battlefield and ability to survive when the rest of his comrades are killed. Grey's field commander, a man that saved his life many times, is lost in the African sector. He goes looking for him, discovering who and what the resistance fighters are, why the Towns are all different in both military might and how they are run, and what the true secret of "Big Mama" is.

== Reception ==
In the introduction to the Viz Media English adaptation, Harlan Ellison compared Grey to his own type of hard-edged speculative fiction.

== Film ==
Where the manga stays on a downward spiral of tragedy, a few choices in the anime adaptation provide some hope to Grey and his companions.

Helen McCarthy praised the film in her book 500 Essential Anime Movies as being "intelligently written". She stated that "although the animation is dated, this is one of the most poignant and compelling anime ever made", calling it a "bleak yet uncompromisingly courageous view of the individual choices and chances against the system".

Justin Sevakis from Anime News Network commented about the film as one of the "few anime that genuinely says something original about the world and societies in which we live, and perhaps one of the better ones is Grey: Digital Target". He felt it was "incredibly rushed, relying on a combination of quick flashbacks and bland dialogue to do the sort of narrative and dramatic heavy lifting that a better show would have conveyed visually". This detriment causes the character development to be "are more or less wasted" and didn't produce "any sort of real attachment". He praised the film with its "thought provoking ideas—ideas with roots in the revolutionary ideas of a teenager, but with the understanding of the world that only an adult can bring" but admittedly, it "has too many flaws to be recommended wholeheartedly".

== Influence ==
In 2022, Lawrence English used Grey as the basis for his album Approach., while in 1996, the band Chemlab released the album East Side Militia with Grey on its cover.

== Reception ==
The Encyclopedia of Science Fiction described Grey as combining teenage cynicism, Orwellian satire and the escalating, ultimately unwinnable conflicts characteristic of arcade video games. It compared the manga's rigidly stratified society, in which social advancement depends on participation in an endless war, to Aldous Huxley's Brave New World. The encyclopedia also identified thematic parallels with later Japanese science fiction, including Hiroshi Mori's The Sky Crawlers and Hiroshi Sakurazaka's All You Need Is Kill. It noted the manga's historical significance as one of the earliest science-fiction manga translated into English, highlighting its endorsement by Harlan Ellison and continued availability during the subsequent growth of the American manga market.

Regarding the anime adaptation, the encyclopedia observed that its production during the manga's serialization resulted in a different conclusion. Rather than depicting Grey's climactic confrontation with the computer Big Mama, the film ends with a post-credits title implying that his mission succeeded but cost him his life.
