= Janoschs Traumstunde =

German animated children's television series

- Genre: Children's; Animation
- Starring: Günter Dybus; Joachim Kerzel; Hansjoachim Krietsch; Hildegard Krekel; Josef Meinertzhagen; Peter René Körner; Maria Barring
- Country of origin: West Germany
- No. of seasons: 2
- No. of episodes: 26

Production
- Running time: 30 minutes

Original release
- Release: October 12, 1986 – April 2, 1990

Janoschs Traumstunde is a West German animated children's television series that originally aired from 1986 to 1990. It was based on the works of German artist and children's book author Janosch, with directors Jürgen Egenolf, Uwe-Peter Jeske and Wolfgang Urchs.

== Format ==
Almost every episode contains two self-contained stories; in some cases, episodes featured three to four shorter stories. The stories are framed by a series of sequences featuring the "Big, Fat, Fabulous Bear," who introduced the stories in each episode.

== Broadcast and home media release ==
In Germany, the first season aired from October 12, 1986, to January 4, 1987, and the second season between January 7 and April 2, 1990, both airing on ARD. Re-runs later aired on KiKa from April 8, 2007, until April 5, 2008. In the United Kingdom, it was broadcast as The Bear, The Tiger and the Others on CBBC in the 1980s.

In the United States, the series (dubbed in English and released under the title Janosch) was distributed on VHS by Celebrity Home Entertainment's "Just for Kids" imprint; it briefly aired on Nickelodeon's Nick Jr. block as Janosch's Dream World (a direct translation of the original German title) from 1993 to 1994.

== See also ==
- List of German television series
