= Saint Elmo – Hikari no Raihousha =

1986 television film directed by Tomoharu Katsumata

セントエルモ・光の来訪者
- Genre: Science fiction
- Anime television film
- Directed by: Tomoharu Katsumata
- Written by: Hiroyasu Yamaura
- Music by: Michiru Ōshima
- Studio: Toei Animation
- Original network: Yomiuri TV
- Released: April 1986
- Runtime: 65 minutes

Saint Elmo – Hikari no Raihousha (セントエルモ・光の来訪者, Saint Elmo – Apostle of Light) is a 65-minute television special first originally aired in April 1986, in the Kansai region network Yomiuri Telecasting Corporation. Although credited to Leiji Matsumoto, the show was originally created to celebrate the 35th anniversary of the Kansai Electric Power Company, who sponsored and produced the film. It was later released on VHS format on November 21, 1987, by Pony Canyon.

The events of the story are centered on a Japanese solar power plant based in the planet Mercury called "Saint Elmo". Its name was based on the rare scientific phenomenon called St. Elmo's fire, named after Erasmus of Formiae. This phenomenon occurs in electrical weather at which high points (like masts on ships) will charge and give off a glow.

== Premise ==
Japan builds a large space power plant called Saint Elmo in the planet Mercury. The plant supports Earth with its large solar energy supply, but, when there is an abnormality at the plant, Earth has to send several technicians to fix the problem.

== Staff ==
- Director: Tomoharu Katsumata
- Script: Hiroyasu Yamaura
- Music: Michiru Oshima
- Animation: Yasuhiro Yamaguchi
- Design: Katsumi Itahashi

== Cast ==
- Tōru Furuya, as Issei Yūki (有紀一星)
- Hideyuki Tanaka
- Kei Tomiyama
- Keiko Han
- Kōzō Shioya
- Leiji Matsumoto
- Masako Nozawa
- Reiko Mutō

== Theme songs ==
The show features two theme songs, "Prometheus Futatabi" and "Tomoshibi wa Eternity", both performed by Yūko Ishikawa. The first was composed by Akihiro Yoshimi, while the second was composed by Yūhei Hanaoka. They were both arranged by Eiji Kawamura and the lyrics were written by Kayoko Fuyumori.
