= Sango-sho Densetsu: Aoi Umi no Erufii =

- Genre: Fantasy, adventure
- Screenplay by: Nobuyuki Fujimoto
- Directed by: Yoshio Kuroda
- Music by: Toshiyuki Watanabe
- Country of origin: Japan
- Original language: Japanese

Production
- Executive producer: Koichi Motohashi
- Producers: Shigeo Endo; Taihei Ishikawa
- Running time: 75 minutes
- Production companies: Fuji Television; Nippon Animation

Original release
- Network: FNS (Fuji TV)
- Release: May 19, 1986

Sango-sho Densetsu: Aoi Umi no Erufii (サンゴ礁伝説 青い海のエルフィ, Coral Reef Legend: Elfie of the Blue Sea) is a 1986 Japanese anime fantasy adventure television film directed by Yoshio Kuroda. It was broadcast on May 19, 1986, on Fuji Television.

== Plot ==
In the future, the oceans have risen to flood all the continents due to humanity's negligence of the environment. Only a few bits of land have been spared, and one of those is the city-island where Elfie lives with her grandfather. One day, due to an underwater incident, she discovers that she can breathe underwater. Her grandfather reveals that in truth she is one of the mythical sea-people. Using the city folk's xenophobia, local politicians spark a war with these hidden people to distract people from their current resource problems, and Elfie is caught in the middle of it.

== Releases ==
It was released in Portugal as Elfie a Salvadora do Planeta.
