= Roots Search =

1986 Japanese film

ルーツ・サーチ 食心物体X (Rūtsu Sāchi Shokushin Buttai Ekkusu)
- Genre: horror, science fiction
- Original video animation
- Directed by: Hisashi Sugai
- Produced by: Kiyoshi Shoji
- Written by: Michiru Shimada
- Music by: Osamu Shooji
- Studio: Production Wave; Nippon Columbia
- Released: September 10, 1986
- Runtime: 45 minutes

Roots Search (ルーツ・サーチ 食心物体X, Rūtsu sāchi-shoku kokoro buttai X) is a 1986 science fiction horror original video animation directed by Hisashi Sugai. It was released on September 10, 1986.

The story is that of a research crew on a space station find a desolate ship with only one survivor. The crew is then stalked by a psychic alien who wishes to kill them. The plot and setting bear similarities to the 1979 film Alien.

== Plot ==
Research station, four scientists. A small ship, the Green Planet, falls out of hyperspace at this station. 9 crew members are dead, only Assistant Captain Buzz survived. Scientists carry the guy to the station, and with it - a strange alien who does not show signs of life. At the insistence of the chief, the alien body is thrown into space. And then scientists are haunted by the memories of the meanness they have committed in life, dead friends, acquaintances and lovers cry for vengeance. Scientists are dying all but the only lady who falls in love with Buzz. Alien claims he was sent by God to punish mankind for sins. Buzz and the girl blow up the station, but do not have time to escape themselves.

== Voice actors ==
- Banjou Ginga as Norman
- Kenyuu Horiuchi as Buzz
- Osamu Kobayashi as Marcus
- Yusaku Yara as Alien X
- Hideyuki Tanaka as Sander
- Kaneto Shiozawa as Scott
- Keiko Han as Moira
- Michitaka Kobayashi as Raymond
- Shigeru Muroi as Catherine

== Production ==
Roots Search is directed by Hisashi Sugai, whose only other credit is as a producer for the MD Geist.

== Release ==
It was released on laserdisc and VHS in the United States. The soundtrack was released on vinyl record.

== Reception ==
On Anime News Network, Justin Sevakis said "There is simply nothing good about Roots Search. It's stupid, ugly, badly dated, and annoying." Other reviewers noted the similarities to the film Alien, going so far as to call it "derivative dreck".
