= Ai City =

Japanese manga

- Cover of the first manga

アイ・シティ (Ai Shiti)
- Genre: Science Fiction
- Manga
- Written by: Syufo
- Published by: Futabasha
- Magazine: Super Action
- Original run: June 1983 – July 1984
- Volumes: 2
- Anime film
- Directed by: Kōichi Mashimo
- Produced by: Masaru Umehara (Executive); Hiroshi Katō; Hideo Kawano (Assistant); Tsuneo Tamura (Assistant)
- Written by: Hideki Sonoda
- Music by: Shirō Sagisu
- Studio: Ashi Productions; AIC
- Licensed by: The Right Stuf International
- Released: July 26, 1986
- Runtime: 86 minutes

Ai City (アイ・シティ, Ai Shiti; trans. Love City) is a Japanese science fiction manga created by Syufo (real name Shūhō Itahashi (板橋 しゅうほう, Itahashi Shūhō)). The story was later adapted into an anime film directed by Kōichi Mashimo and released on July 26, 1986.

== Plot ==
In 1983, off-duty policeman Reiden picks up a suspicious couple, Kei and Ai, who claim to be father and daughter but appear to be close in age. Reiden thus becomes involved in a fight between them and the female fighter K2 who is chasing them. Kei draws out his latent ability to the maximum by a Legendary "Trigger" and Ai blows away K2. The night sky splits and strange space is shown. Their enemy is the secret society "Fraud" of para-psionics, which is commanded by Kuu Ragua Lee. Kei, Ai and Reiden meet the assassins whom Fraud sends out one after another.

== Characters ==
=== Ai's companions ===
I2 (Ai)
Ai is Headmeters who escaped from Fraud with Kei, but she does not have the operation yet. Her original name is "I2". She is a clone of Kei's lover Etsuko (also known as "I") who was killed by Fraud, and adores Kei as a father. Fraud suspects that she is legendary "Trigger" who draws out others' dormant faculties and amplifies them, and so pursues her. "2" of "I2" stands for "the second generation of the clone of Headmeters I". However, nobody of Headmeters knew who "I" or "I2" are, there is no information about the two in the memory bank of Fraud's computer, and "Headmeters I" is a missing number. It is not clear why they recognized "I" and "I2", but the two people did not exist actually.
K (Kei)
Kei is Headmeters who escaped from Fraud to defend Ai. He was anaesthetized suddenly and was made to undergo the operation for Headmeters on his college days. He was given the code name "K". He was proud of being Headmeters, but he became despondent because his lover Etsuko died from the same operation as him. Then, a girl appeared who was just like Etsuko, only ten years younger. She introduced herself as Ai-"I2". "I" was a code name of Etsuko. Kei decided to behave as her father.
Kei has both abilities of Headmeters and Tuned-man exceptionally, because Kuu Ragua Lee, the leader of Fraud, operated on Kei in person. However, he is a defect product as Headmeters and has only the faculty for incomplete mind reading. The number of his headmeter has risen only to level 5 by the shock of Etsuko's death, but the number rises to infinite when Ai draws out his latent abilities. His performance as Tuned-man is less than 1/10 of the output of Yi or Lyan, but Fraud performed the operation which is different from them on Kei. Sensors which are embedded on the 108 vital points of his body control his muscles, internal organs and brain, and he can always utilize his muscles at 100% (people usually use only about 20%).
Cat
The stray cat who touched the topology wall, and lost the tail. Ai brings along the cat after she treats the injury.
Reiden Yoshioka
The obliging policeman involved in the Kei and Ai versus Fraud fight. He is 34 years old, automania, and his car is an Alpina based on BMW cars. He is in a dilemma between his wife Akemi and K2, currently charmed by him.
K2
K2 is Kei's feminized clone who was born through chromosome manipulation. She is a high-ranking Headmeters of Fraud who is the same level as Mr. J in capability, and commands the pursuit corps to Kei and Ai. She loves Kei by fervent narcissism and demands him to love her. She wants to kill Ai for monopolizing his love. She lost her memory and regressed to an infantile state of mind by touching the topology wall and took to Reiden, who saved her. She recovers her memory later, but she does not change her mind.
Lee
Lee is an old security guard at a supermarket. He looks after Ai for Kei. He is a kind old man, but also mysterious and is revealed to actually be Headmeters of level 100.

=== Residents of floor 1983 ===
Akemi Yoshioka
Akemi is Reiden's wife and she dominates him. She is possessed by Alloy, who makes her its puppet.
Sugiura
One of the hoodlum group of 3s. He is a little man with suspenders. Alloy possesses him and manipulates him any way it wants. They bear a grudge against Reiden for reporting their injustice in the university entrance exam to the police, and they ambush him at his home and attack him. They had parents hush up the rape and the violence till then.
Miyasaka
One of the hoodlum group of 3s. He is a big-boned man. He is pushed away on a road by Sugiura controlled by Alloy and is run over by a car.
Takenaka
One of the hoodlum group of 3s. He is a foppish man who wears sunglasses, dyes his hair brown and has a permanent. He shoots Reiden with a gun, but the bullet is teleported to the inside of his body and he dies.

=== Residents of floor 2183 ===
Kuu Ragua Lee
The leader of "Fraud", which is the highest consultative body of "Floor 2183" and manages "Floor 1983". Supported by Headmeters with supernatural power, he is in opposition to the chief delegate Lai Lou Chin. He himself is Headmeters, level 100. He is a skinhead and a brawny big man. He equips his head with the metal electronic device which covers his eyes, mouth and forehead. He believed that he was the governing class who managed the human beings of Floor 1983, who will live in 1983 fixed forever, but he notices that he is also a captive himself managed by higher-ranking inspectors. He then decides to challenge them to fight.
J (Mr. J)
Mr. J is a high-ranking Headmeters of Fraud, at level 40. He is a sexless youth of long hair. He is Kuu Ragua Lee's page boy and admires and loves him. He always fears that Kuu Ragua Lee will lose his concern about him. He commands the operational unit which pursues Kei and Ai.
A (Miss A)
Miss A is a leader of Headmeters, Kuu Ragua Lee's right-hand woman and a daughter of the Coedes family. She is a muscular woman. Her younger brother "B" is in Headmeters.
Yi
Yi is a secret agent of Fraud. He is a Tuned-man who was converted by Fraud with fighting power at the same level as a tank. He can shoot rays from his finger-tip. He dresses in black from head to toe, wearing a Mao suit, round-framed glasses and a black hat. He makes a combination with Lyan and both chase Kei and the others together.
Lyan
Lyan is Yi's partner and a Tuned-man converted by Fraud as well. His clothes are black like Yi's. He is killed by "Cat" who had his power amplified by Ai.
Talkative dolls
"Talkative doll" is a general term for the androids who serve as an operator in Fraud headquarters. Their appearance resembles that of a naked middle-aged man with a skinhead.
Lai Lou Chin
Lai Lou Chin is a chief delegate of "Floor 2183" and is the only person who opposes the leader of Fraud, Kuu Ragua Lee. He is a poor-looking old man with a bobbed hair style. He always soaks in a capsule filled with special solution in the nude. The capsule is set in the position ranging from the body to the head of the large-sized humanoid robot. The robot serves as a substitute for the body of Lai Lou Chin and the capsule has the function to prevent "mind reading" of Headmeters. He is called "Enema head" by Miss A, because the form of the capsule resembles a disposable syringe.

=== Residents of the upper floor ===
Alloy
Alloy is in the floor above where Ai and Kei are, and sends only speculation into lower floors from there. The identity of Alloy is a thing invented based on "Program alloy" which is against Ai and tries to incorporate the gene in itself when it finds the gene that the program does not have. Alloy was invented by incorporating the program in a monster cell discovered by chance. Alloy stores billions of human genes in the cell. Since Alloy is an infinite form, it interferes in the world by getting into an organism and controlling its consciousness. However, the host whose consciousness Alloy influences becomes very suggestible. Alloy possesses "Cat", a staff of Fraud, Sugiura, Yoshioka, Akemi, the artificial body of Lai Lou Chin in sequence, and handles their body. Alloy can draw out potential capacities of those whom Alloy touches and possesses like Ai.

=== Residents in A.D. 1983 ===
Lee Kuwabara
Kuwabara is the head of Kasuga lab which existed in Izu, Shizuoka in Japan once. He won fame as a professor of the bionics department of Los Angeles Institute of Technology. However, he was expelled from the bionics society, because he repeated medical experimentation on a living person to artificially create a person with supernatural powers. When he was out of work, Sosuke Kasuga, his best friend and the head of Kasuga lab, gave him a job. Kuwabara assumed the head of the Kasuga lab after Sosuke's death, but Kuwabara betrayed Sosuke and his son after all, and returned to the society thanks to the program that they had studied. He is the original of Kuu Ragua Lee and old Lee. The two are his clones.
Kasuga
Kasuga is the son of Sosuke Kasuga, the former head of Kasuga lab, and is the research worker. He lost his father and wife and daughter in a traffic accident at the same time in 1980. He completed "Program Ai", which Sosuke studied. He is the original of Kei.

== Terms ==
Floor
"Floor" is a cylindrical world with a radius of 440km which extends concentrically from its center at "Fraud Building (The Pillar of God)". It is surrounded by topology walls.
Fraud
"Fraud" is para-psychicers' group. They are considered to be a national prime consultative body in Floor 2183. Kuu Ragua Lee violated custom and established headquarters inside of "The Pillar of God", which he calls "Fraud Building". He lives in there.
Headmeters
"Headmeters" are members of Fraud who use para-supernatural power. They analyze others' brain waves with the help of many electronic devices buried in their bodies and read their minds (para-telepathy). They can control magnetic fields to float in the air and move objects (para-levitation and para-psychokinesis), and they can predict what will happen in the near future at high hitting ratio by communicating with the city computer directly (para-precognition). When they show their ability, their forehead displays the number suitable for the degree. They occasionally equip the power supporter which is the heavy armaments for anti-Tuned-man warfare.
Tuned-man (Cyborg)
"Tuned-men" are combat cyborgs to whom artificial muscle, the metal skeleton, etc. are transplanted. They match a tank in fighting power. It is especially easy to read their minds for Headmeters.
Diver
"Diver" is a pet name of new and powerful mobile sky soldier or combat flying boat that Lai Lou Chin lent to Kuu Ragua Lee. Diver is a military escort for Kuu Ragua Lee to counter a new enemy, Alloy. Diver is a disk type and is propelled by a jet engine. Diver divides into 2 parts, and the upper part (Diver1) transforms into a combat humanoid robot. The lower part (Diver2) can be used as a flying boat as it is after separation.

== Film adaptation ==
An eponymous OVA was produced in 1986 and was shown at movie theaters affiliated with Toho on July 26, 1986.

The movie plot is only loosely based on the source manga.

=== Anime plot ===
The anime starts off sometime in the future, with Kei and Ai running for their lives. Ai is a girl who holds a terrible secret which could destroy the current world. The world is now populated by Headmeters, people who have psychic powers and whose strength is shown on their forehead when they fight. Kei was an experimental Headmeter subject, whose strength never went above level 5. In desperate moments, though, when Ai is in trouble, Kei can increase his ability to infinity. The one who is after her has a deep secret and is aided by a small dwarflike man who lives in a robotic suit. Eventually Ai is captured and Kei, a detective and another Headmeter who was converted to the good side when Kei unleashed his horrible powers must go and rescue her. Together they must save Ai and the secret she holds.

== Reception ==
Helen McCarthy in 500 Essential Anime Movies praises anime film for having "one of the best endings in anime".

The film entry in The Encyclopedia of Science Fiction called it an entertaining anime, praising its interesting visuals, touches of surrealism and relatively effective characterization compared with other action anime of its era. However, it criticized the plot, which only loosely follows the original manga, as insufficiently coherent despite maintaining narrative momentum. It particularly faulted the time loop ending, considering it an arbitrary twist intended to surprise viewers rather than a logical consequence of preceding events. The encyclopedia also noted the presence of fan service and observed that the detective Reiden and the intelligent cat primarily served as sources of comic relief and exposition.

Writing in the third edition of The Anime Encyclopedia (2015), Jonathan Clements and Helen McCarthy described Ai City as "a poor man's Akira" but considered it much more than the sum of its parts, praising its surreal imagery, depiction of psychic battles and plot involving multiple universes. They argued that the film had been overshadowed by later, better-funded science fiction anime despite having a superior plot to contemporaries such as Locke the Superman. They particularly praised Hideki Sonoda's screenplay, highlighting its inventive terminology and gradual revelation of the protagonists' backgrounds and motivations. They considered the film's ending one of the best in anime and suggested that it had subsequently been appropriated for the finale of Urotsukidōji.

A contemporary review from Anime News Network praises its visual inventiveness. However, it addresses the second-half as "muddled" and the ending as a "dissatisfying attempt ... even by anime standards."
