= Amon Saga =

Original video animation

アモン・サーガ (Amon Sāga)
- Genre: Fantasy
- Manga
- Written by: Baku Yumemakura
- Illustrated by: Yoshitaka Amano
- Published by: Tokuma Shoten
- Imprint: Motion Books
- Published: August 20, 1984
- Volumes: 1
- Original video animation
- Directed by: Shunji Ōga
- Written by: Noboru Shiroyama
- Music by: Shigeaki Saegusa
- Studio: Cente Studio
- Licensed by: Manga Entertainment
- Released: July 19, 1986
- Runtime: 75 minutes

Amon Saga (アモン・サーガ, Amon Sāga) is an OVA film released in 1986. The OVA is based on a manga from 1984 which was written by Baku Yumemakura and illustrated by Yoshitaka Amano. It was released in English by Manga Entertainment in 2001.

== World ==
The world of Amon Saga is a medieval one, filled with bizarre creatures, such as the giant turtle that holds the Valhiss fortress, home of the Emperor, on its back. The world is populated by both human and humanoid creatures. The story is set in a time when the Valhiss Empire is trying to take over the world through a map. Amon is a warrior seeking vengeance for his late mother, who was killed by the Emperor Valhiss. He enlists in the Emperor's military forces to gain entry to the fortress. On a mission he meets one of the Emperors' captives, Princess Lichia, who aids him.

== Characters ==
Amon
Voiced by: Kenyu Horiuchi (Japanese); Hideo Seaver (English)

The title character of the movie, Amon is a young swordsman similar in appearance to Elric of Melniboné, with amazing skill. He joins the Valhiss army with the intention of avenging his mother's death, by killing the emperor.

Gaius
Voiced by: Mugihito (Japanese); David Brimmer (English)

A huge man who also seeks to join Valhiss' army. After a brief encounter with Amon in a bar, the two men form mutual respect for each other's abilities, and work together to pass the recruitment test.

Alcan
Voiced by: Katsuji Mori (Japanese); Dan Olk (English)

A clever, agile fighter whose tongue lashes as often as his whip. Like Gaius and Amon, he joins the Valhiss army for mysterious reasons, which are revealed later in the movie as he fights alongside them.

Ho the Dragon Tailed
Voiced by: Kōji Totani (Japanese); Ed Kissel (English)

A sniper with dark green skin and a tail, Ho doesn't say or do much during the movie. However, when he does, it has a great effect on the situation at hand, such as helping Amon defeat the giant serpent. His name and appearance suggest he may be some sort of lizard man.

Princess Lichia
Voiced by: Yoshino Takamori (Japanese); Angora Deb (English)

The beautiful daughter of King Darai Sem, she is being held hostage by Valhiss in exchange for a map leading to the legendary Valley of Gold. While bathing in a lake, she is attacked by a giant serpent, and saved by Amon and Ho. She has the same name as her mother, the name given to all women in the Vindorana royal line.

Ekuna
Voiced by: Banjō Ginga (Japanese); Dan Stevens (English)

A legendary swordsman and poet who trained Amon after his mother died. He regrets seeing Amon use his talent for revenge. He bears a resemblance to Vampire Hunter D, the title character of a similar fantasy movie which was also based on illustrations by Yoshitaka Amano.

Emperor Valhiss
Voiced by: Kiyoshi Kobayashi (Japanese); Keith Howard (English)

The ruler of the empire bearing his name who seeks to conquer the world.

Mabo
Voiced by: Ichirō Nagai (Japanese); J. Robert Spencer (English)

An old sorcerer who serves the emperor. He takes great delight in opportunities to display his magic power, and to undermine Denon.

Denon
Voiced by: Norio Wakamoto (Japanese); Flavio Romeo (English)

The captain of the Valhiss army and a skilled swordsman. Denon came up with the plan to kidnap Lichia and hold her for ransom.

King Darai Sem
Voiced by: Tamio Ōki (Japanese); Nick Yates (English)

The king of Vindorana, who came from another land. He became king after he saved the life of Vindorana's princess Lichia. He travels in a fleet of ships that sail on grass instead of water.
