= Super Mario Bros.: The Great Mission to Rescue Princess Peach! =

1986 Japanese anime film

- Theatrical release poster

Japanese name
- Kanji: スーパーマリオブラザーズ ピーチ姫救出大作戦!
Transcriptions
- Revised Hepburn: Sūpā Mario Burazāzu: Pīchi-hime Kyūshutsu Dai Sakusen!
- Directed by: Masami Hata
- Written by: Hideo Takayashiki
- Based on: Super Mario Bros. by Nintendo
- Produced by: Masakatsu Suzuki; Tsunemasa Hatano
- Starring: Tōru Furuya; Yū Mizushima; Mami Yamase; Akiko Wada
- Cinematography: Horofumi Kumagai
- Edited by: Kenichi Takashima
- Music by: Toshiyuki Kimori; Koji Kondo
- Production companies: Grouper Productions; Nintendo; Shochiku
- Distributed by: Shochiku-Fuji Company
- Release date: 20 July 1986
- Running time: 61 minutes
- Country: Japan
- Language: Japanese

Super Mario Bros.: The Great Mission to Rescue Princess Peach! (Note: スーパーマリオブラザーズ ピーチ姫救出大作戦!, Sūpā Mario Burazāzu: Pīchi-hime Kyūshutsu Dai Sakusen!) is a 1986 Japanese animated adventure comedy film, based on the 1985 video game Super Mario Bros. Directed by Masami Hata and produced by Masakatsu Suzuki and Tsunemasa Hatano, the plot centers on Mario and Luigi, who go on a quest to save Princess Peach from King Koopa.

It is one of the two first films based on a video game, along with Running Boy: Star Soldier's Secret, released on the same day. It is the earliest isekai anime to involve a virtual video game world.

== Plot ==
Mario is playing a game on his Family Computer late at night when he witnesses a blonde-haired girl in a pink dress on the television screen calling out for help from enemies attacking her. She escapes by jumping out of the TV and introduces herself as Princess Peach. King Koopa appears and follows her out of the TV. Mario fights him, but is no match for Koopa, who successfully captures Peach and goes back into the TV. Mario discovers a small green necklace that Peach left on the floor.

The next day, while he and his brother Luigi are working at their grocery store, Mario cannot stop thinking about Peach and the necklace. Luigi claims the jewel on the necklace is said to lead its owner to the Mushroom Kingdom, a supposed land of treasures. A small dog-like creature wanders into the store and snatches the necklace from Mario, prompting him and Luigi to give chase and fall down a pipe.

When they emerge, a mushroom hermit reveals that he ordered the dog, Kibidango, to bring the brothers to him. He explains that they are now in the Mushroom Kingdom, which is being ravaged by King Koopa and his army. Angry that his marriage proposal was spurned by Peach, Koopa is turning the citizens into inanimate objects, and plans to force Peach into marriage on Friday the 13th. The hermit reveals a legend that claims the Mario Bros. can defeat Koopa, and that they will need to find the three mystical Power-Ups to overcome his magic: the Mushroom, the Flower, and the Star. With the three Power-Ups hidden throughout the Mushroom Kingdom by Koopa's forces, the Mario Bros. set out to find them, guided by Kibidango.

After a long journey with many perilous obstacles, the brothers eventually acquire all three Power-Ups. That night, Mario arrives at King Koopa's castle just as the wedding is starting. With the help of the three Power-Ups, Mario successfully defeats Koopa, breaking his spell and restoring the Mushroom Kingdom to normal. When Mario returns Peach's necklace, Kibidango reverts to his true form, Prince Haru of the Flower Kingdom. Haru explains that he is Peach's fiancé, and was turned into Kibidango by Koopa to marry her in his place. Though heartbroken, Mario wishes the couple well and promises to return if they ever need help, and as they accept it, he and Luigi begin their long journey home.

In a post-credits scene, King Koopa and his minions are now working at the brothers' grocery store as punishment.

== Voice cast ==
- Tōru Furuya as Mario
- Yū Mizushima as Luigi
- Junko Hori as Jugemu and Miss Endless
- Shigeru Chiba as Kibidango
- Masami Kikuchi as Prince Haru
- Kōhei Miyauchi as Mushroom Hermit
- Keaton Yamada as Hammer Bros.
- Yuriko Yamamoto and Hiroko Emori as Kinopio
- Hiroko Maruyama and Kazue Komiya as Kuribō
- Reiko Nakano as Patapata parent
- Hiromi Ōnishi, Chiemi Matsumoto, and Maki Itō as Patapata child
- Tetsuo Mizutori and Masaharu Satō as Nokonoko
- Jōji Yanami as Nokonoko Priest
- Mami Yamase as Princess Peach
- Akiko Wada as King Koopa

== Soundtrack ==
The film's soundtrack was scored by Toshiyuki Kimori. It includes these songs:

- "Doki-Doki Do It!" by Mirai Douji
- "Doki-Doki Do It! (Rock'n Roll Version)" by Mirai Douji
- "Adieu My Love" (アデュー・マイラブ, Adyū Mai Rabu) by Chikako Ishikawa
- "Crystal Ball" (水晶玉, Suishō Tama) by Mami Yamase

The film uses music and sound effects from the Super Mario Bros. video game. An LP was released.

== Production and release ==
In 1986, Mario was already popular in Japan, so Grouper Productions collaborated with Nintendo to produce an anime film. To advertise the film, they released Mario phone cards, watches, rice containers, ramen noodles, a manga, an art book, three riddle books, a picture book, and an original soundtrack released on vinyl and cassette.

The film was released in 200 cinemas across Japan on 20 July 1986. VAP Video later released the film on retail VHS and Betamax in Japan, with no releases internationally, nor on DVD or Blu-ray.

== Legacy ==
The original 1986 VHS release (left) and the 2022 Kineko Video restoration (right)

The film is one of the two first based on a video game, along with Running Boy: Star Soldier's Secret, released the same day. It predates the live-action Super Mario Bros. film by seven years. It is the earliest isekai anime to involve a virtual video game world, and the earliest isekai anime to involve the protagonist being trapped in the virtual world of a video game. Because it involves Mario playing a video game that comes to life, it is an ancestor of the "trapped in a video game" subgenre of isekai anime.

In July 2021, YouTuber Carnivol released a raw 16mm film scan on YouTube and announced that fan restoration group Kineko Video would restore it in 4K. The restoration was released on 16 April 2022.

The Super Mario Bros. Movie (2023) contains references to the 1986 anime film, including a scene of Luigi interrupting Mario as he plays a classic game console.

== See also ==
- List of films based on video games
