= List of Strawberry Shortcake albums =

Strawberry Shortcake has received various musical albums in the franchise's existence.

== Kid Stuff albums ==
During the 1980s, Kid Stuff Records released soundtracks to the animated specials, read-along audiobooks featuring songs and a narrated story, and special albums.

#	Album title	Release year	Music from	Notes	Genre
1	The World Of Strawberry Shortcake	1980	The World of Strawberry Shortcake	Audio version of the special; music by Flo & Eddie	Pop, children's
2	Sweet Songs	1980	Original	Read-along audiobook, also featuring eight song covers	Pop
3	Country Jamboree	1981	Original	One recurring song and four covers	Country
4	Strawberry Shortcake In Big Apple City (Original Soundtrack)	1981	Strawberry Shortcake in Big Apple City	Audio version of the special; music by Flo & Eddie	Pop, children's
5	Strawberry Shortcake Live	1981	Original	Includes covers of "Celebration", "Baby Face", and "New York, New York", and five original tracks composed by John Braden	Disco, funk, pop
6	Sing-A-Long	1981	Original	Compilation of songs from the previous albums	Pop
7	Sweet Songs	1981	Original	Audiobook, also featuring ten songs	Pop
8	I Love You!	1981	Original	Includes a cover of "What the World Needs Now Is Love", alongside original songs by John Braden	Pop
9	Strawberry Shortcake Presents Pets On Parade	1982	Strawberry Shortcake: Pets on Parade	Audio version of the special; music by Flo & Eddie	Pop, children's
10	Let's Dance!	1982	Original	Music by Flo & Eddie	Disco, dance, pop
11	Alphabet Record	1982	Original	Audiobook, music by John Braden	Pop
12	I Love Numbers	1982	Original	Audiobook, music by John Braden	Pop
13	Splash Dance Party	1984	Original	Music by Flo & Eddie	Electronic, funk / soul

== Koch albums ==
=== Live at the Big Apple Disco ===
1. New York, New York
2. Make a Wish
3. Baby Face
4. Big Apple Disco
5. Celebration
6. Strawberry Rap
7. Flying
8. I Can Hear the Music

For the 2003 relaunch of the franchise, DIC Entertainment partnered with their audio distributor Koch Records to release the songs from the series onto CD.

=== Berry, Merry Christmas ===
Strawberry Shortcake: Berry, Merry Christmas

Soundtrack album by Strawberry Shortcake
- Released: November 2003
- Recorded: 2002
- Studio: The Omaha Theater Company for Young People
- Genre: Soundtrack
- Length: 10:48
- Label: Koch Records
- Producers: Andy Heyward; Mike Maliani

Strawberry Shortcake chronology
Strawberry Shortcake: Berry, Merry Christmas (2003)	Strawberry Shortcake: Strawberry Jams (2004)

In November 2003, a 9-track EP soundtrack based on the special of the same name was released by Koch. The songs from the special are featured alongside arrangements of the classic Christmas songs "Jingle Bells" and "Deck the Halls", alongside two instrumental tracks seen in the special itself. The song that accompanies the feature, I Love Berries, was released in the Strawberry Jams CD.

No.	Title	Writer(s)	Artist	Length
1.	"Straw-buh-buh-buh-buh-Berry Shortcake (Theme Song)"	Nick Brown, Sandy Howell and Melanie Anne	Sandy Howell	1:03
2.	"Call Me Santa (Berry Merry Christmas)"	Andy Street, Judy Rothman and Melanie Anne	Sarah Heinke (Strawberry Shortcake)	1:23
3.	"Deck the Halls"	Andy Street and Melanie Anne	Sarah Heinke (Strawberry Shortcake), Hannah Koslosky (Honey Pie Pony), Jay Hanson, Jerry Longe, Ryle Smith (Elves) and Cork Ramer (Santa Claus)	0:31
4.	"Jingle Bells"	Andy Street and Melanie Anne	Sarah Heinke (Strawberry Shortcake), Hannah Koslosky (Honey Pie Pony), Jay Hanson, Jerry Longe, Ryle Smith (Elves) and Cork Ramer (Santa Claus)	0:48
5.	"Holidayland (A Place Full of Joy) (Berry Merry Christmas)"	Andy Street, Judy Rothman and Melanie Anne	Sarah Heinke (Strawberry Shortcake) and Hannah Koslosky (Honey Pie Pony)	1:53
6.	"Sugar Berry Fairy"	Andy Street and Melanie Anne	None (Background Music from Berry Merry Christmas)	0:50
7.	"Hello-Ho-Ho (Berry Merry Christmas)"	Andy Street, Judy Rothman and Melanie Anne	Sarah Heinke (Strawberry Shortcake), Jay Hanson, Jerry Longe, Ryle Smith (Elves) and Cork Ramer (Santa Claus)	1:33
8.	"Christmas Morning"	Andy Street and Melanie Anne	None (Background Music from Berry Merry Christmas)	0:48
9.	"The Gift of Friendship (Berry Merry Christmas)"	Andy Street, Judy Rothman and Melanie Anne	Sarah Heinke (Strawberry Shortcake), DeJare Barfield (Orange Blossom), Samantha Triba (Ginger Snap), Hannah Koslosky (Honey Pie Pony), Rachel Ware (Angel Cake), Hannah Koslosky (Honey Pie Pony) and Huckleberry Pie (Daniel Canfield)	1:55
Total length:				10:48

==== Reception ====
The soundtrack sold over 100,000 units in its first month, and reached #7 in the Billboard children's record charts for the week of Dec. 1, 2003.

=== Strawberry Jams ===
Strawberry Shortcake: Strawberry Jams

Soundtrack album by Strawberry Shortcake
- Released: February 10, 2004
- Recorded: 2002; 2003 (Growing Better)
- Studio: The Omaha Theater Company for Young People
- Genre: Soundtrack
- Labels: Koch Records; Spectrum Music (Europe)
- Producers: Andy Heyward; Mike Maliani

Strawberry Shortcake chronology
Strawberry Shortcake: Berry, Merry Christmas (2003)	Strawberry Shortcake: Strawberry Jams (2004)	Strawberry Shortcake: Seaberry Beach Party Music (2005)

Strawberry Jams was released by Koch in February 2004 and contains music from three of the original specials - Meet Strawberry Shortcake, Spring for Strawberry Shortcake and Strawberry Shortcake's Get Well Adventure, as well as songs from the special music videos for the specials (including the Merry Merry Christmas one) as well as the song from the Growing Better All the Time short.

The album was also released on audio cassette in limited quantities. The Asian release of the CD lacks the tracks I Love Berries and Friendship Grows.

The Enhanced CD bonus features are the music videos for "A Snappy Ginger Snap" and "Knock, Knock, Who's There?" and a promo for the three specials the songs feature on.

No.	Title	Writer(s)	Artist	Length
1.	"Straw-buh-buh-buh-buh-Berry Shortcake (Theme Song)"	Nick Brown, Sandy Howell and Melanie Anne	Sandy Howell	1:03
2.	"Knock, Knock, Who's There? (Meet Strawberry Shortcake Music Video)"	Andy Street, Judy Rothman and Melanie Anne	Sarah Heinke (Strawberry Shortcake), DeJare Barfield (Orange Blossom), Samantha Triba (Ginger Snap), Hannah Koslosky (Honey Pie Pony) and Rachel Ware (Angel Cake)	1:05
3.	"Jammin' (Springtime for Strawberry Shortcake)"	Andy Street, Judy Rothman and Melanie Anne	Sarah Heinke (Strawberry Shortcake), DeJare Barfield (Orange Blossom) and Samantha Triba (Ginger Snap)	1:56
4.	"I Put the Zing in Spring (Springtime for Strawberry Shortcake)"	Andy Street, Judy Rothman and Melanie Anne	Sarah Heinke (Strawberry Shortcake), DeJare Barfield (Orange Blossom), Samantha Triba (Ginger Snap) and Camillie Schmidt (Spring)	1:22
5.	"Springtime (Springtime for Strawberry Shortcake)"	Andy Street, David Goldsmith and Melanie Anne	Sarah Heinke (Strawberry Shortcake)	1:45
6.	"It's All How You Look at It (Strawberry Shortcake's Get Well Adventure)"	Andy Street, Judy Rothman and Melanie Anne	Sarah Heinke (Strawberry Shortcake), DeJare Barfield (Orange Blossom), Samantha Triba (Ginger Snap), Hannah Koslosky (Honey Pie Pony) and Rachel Ware (Angel Cake)	1:41
7.	"Work Together (Spring for Strawberry Shortcake)"	Andy Street, David Goldsmith and Melanie Anne	Sarah Heinke (Strawberry Shortcake), Hannah Koslosky (Honey Pie Pony), Rachel Ware (Angel Cake) and Daniel Canfield (Huckleberry Pie)	1:44
8.	"Growing Better (Growing Better All The Time short)"	Andy Street, David Goldsmith and Melanie Anne	Sarah Heinke (Strawberry Shortcake), Katie Labosky (Apple Dumplin'), DeJare Barfield (Orange Blossom), Samantha Triba (Ginger Snap), Hannah Koslosky (Honey Pie Pony), Rachel Ware (Angel Cake) and Daniel Canfield (Huckleberry Pie)	1:37
9.	"A Berry Happy Birthday (Meet Strawberry Shortcake)"	Andy Street, Judy Rothman and Melanie Anne	Sarah Heinke (Strawberry Shortcake), DeJare Barfield (Orange Blossom), Samantha Triba (Ginger Snap), Hannah Koslosky (Honey Pie Pony), Rachel Ware (Angel Cake) and Daniel Canfield (Huckleberry Pie)	1:41
10.	"Have a Good Trip (Strawberry Shortcake's Get Well Adventure)"	Andy Street, Judy Rothman and Melanie Anne	Sarah Heinke (Strawberry Shortcake), DeJare Barfield (Orange Blossom), Samantha Triba (Ginger Snap) and Hannah Koslosky (Honey Pie Pony)	1:45
11.	"Strawberry Girl in a Strawberry World (Meet Strawberry Shortcake)"	Andy Street, Judy Rothman and Melanie Anne	Sarah Heinke (Strawberry Shortcake)	1:39
12.	"A Snappy Ginger Snap (Spring for Strawberry Shortcake Music Video)"	Andy Street, Judy Rothman and Melanie Anne	Samantha Triba (Ginger Snap)	1:34
13.	"The Cookie Song (Meet Strawberry Shortcake)"	Andy Street, Judy Rothman and Melanie Anne	Sarah Heinke (Strawberry Shortcake), Katie Labosky (Apple Dumplin') and Samantha Triba (Ginger Snap)	1:15
14.	"The Strawberry Shake (Get Well Adventure Music Video)"	Andy Street, Judy Rothman and Melanie Anne	Sarah Heinke (Strawberry Shortcake)	2:41
15.	"The Gettin' Better Boogie Woogie (Get Well Adventure)"	Andy Street, Judy Rothman and Melanie Anne	Sarah Heinke (Strawberry Shortcake), DeJare Barfield (Orange Blossom), Samantha Triba (Ginger Snap), Hannah Koslosky (Honey Pie Pony) and Rachel Ware (Angel Cake)	1:39
16.	"That's Imagination (Get Well Adventure)"	Andy Street, Judy Rothman and Melanie Anne	Sarah Heinke (Strawberry Shortcake), DeJare Barfield (Orange Blossom) and Samantha Triba (Ginger Snap)	1:48
17.	"I Love Berries (Berry Merry Christmas Music Video)"	Andy Street, Judy Rothman and Melanie Anne	Sarah Heinke (Strawberry Shortcake)	2:29
18.	"Friendship Grows (Meet Strawberry Shortcake)"	Andy Street, Judy Rothman and Melanie Anne	Sarah Heinke (Strawberry Shortcake) and DeJare Barfield (Orange Blossom)	1:37
19.	"Straw-buh-buh-buh-buh-Berry Shortcake (Instrumental Version)"	Nick Brown, Sandy Howell and Melanie Anne	None	0:31

=== Seaberry Beach Party Music ===
Seaberry Beach Party Music was released by Koch in 2005 and contains music from Seaberry Beach Party, Adventures on Ice Cream Island and Play Day Surprise.

The Enhanced CD bonus features are the music videos for "Ev'ryone Loves Berry Ball" and "Tell Me a Story", as well as a promo for the franchise and two commercials for Bandai's toy range.

=== Music for Dress-up Days ===
Music for Dress-up Days was released by Koch in 2006 and contains music from Best Pets Yet, Moonlight Mysteries and Dress-up Days. This is the last Strawberry Shortcake album to be released in Europe.

The Enhanced CD bonus features are the music videos for "The Best Invention Ever" and "The Too Nice Werewolf".

=== The Sweet Dreams Movie ===
The Sweet Dreams Movie was released by Koch in 2006 and features the soundtrack from the film of the same name, alongside a small number of extra songs.

=== World of Friends ===
World of Friends was released by Koch in 2007 and contains music from World of Friends, Berry Fairy Tales and Cooking Up Fun.

=== Let's Dance ===
Let's Dance was released by Koch in October 2007 and contains music from Berry Blossom Festival, Let's Dance and the then-unannounced Berry Big Journeys.

=== Rockaberry Roll ===
Rockaberry Roll was released by Koch in August 2008 and contains songs from the Rockaberry Roll and Big Country Fun. It also contains a small number of extra tracks featured on the Strawberry Jams and Seaberry Beach Party Music CDs, and exclusive Spanish versions of "The Strawberry Shake" and the Title Theme.

=== CDs released with books ===
In addition to the abovementioned CDs, a special 10-track CD was released with the book Strawberry Shortcake: Sing-a-Long, published by Alfred Music. The CD contains five full songs selected from the Strawberry Jams CD as well as the same five songs in minus-one, allowing one to karaoke with the songs. The CD is also special in the sense that it is the only place one can find the complete minus-one of the title theme as heard during the credits sequence of the first four DVDs or 4/8 episodes of the show.
