= LBS Communications =

Television syndication company

LBS Communications, Inc.
- Company logo used from 1976 to 1992
- Industry: Television syndication
- Founded: November 15, 1976; 50 years ago
- Defunct: 1992; 34 years ago
- Fate: Acquired by and folded into All American Communications
- Successor: All American Communications Television
- Headquarters: New York City, New York, United States
- Parent: Grey Advertising (1976–1988)

The Lexington Broadcast Services Company (first known as Lexington Broadcast Services and later known as LBS Communications) was an American television production and syndication company founded on November 15, 1976, by advertising pioneer Henry Siegel, who, according to Advertising Age, was "the man who built Lexington Broadcast Services into the nation's largest barter syndicator, and thus defined that segment of the TV ad business."

== History ==
LBS was originally a unit of Grey Advertising, in order to develop products that were marketed for syndication. Some of the first products that were made were Not for Women Only, which was produced by WNBC-TV in New York City, and Hot Fudge, which was produced by then-ABC O&O WXYZ-TV in Detroit. Siegel was moved from Grey Advertising's president in order to become head of Lexington Broadcast Services Company. In 1977, it launched its first breakout hit for the company, Sha Na Na, for syndication, with advertising on a barter basis.

In December 1982, it secured a licensing agreement with Columbia Pictures Television to bring the ABC drama Family to off-network syndication on a barter basis; this would begin in September 1983. The success of Family led to the formation of the Colex Enterprises joint venture (as mentioned below). In 1986, it launched a syndicated block with DIC Entertainment and Mattel, Kideo TV. That year, DIC and LBS formed the Family Theater package of eight animated specials, and decided that DIC and LBS would team up with Columbia Pictures Television to produce a live-action Dennis the Menace feature film.

In 1985, LBS, DIC Enterprises and Karl/Lorimar Home Video set up a home video distribution venture, Kideo Video, which released titles from LBS' Kideo catalog, through which, by 1986, LBS planned to release titles for the videocassette market, and it gained programming rights for 200 Kideo titles. By 1987, LBS had to market beauty videocassettes due to the underperforming expectations of the initial Kideo videocassettes, and sponsored made-for-TV specials would not be included in its initial deal.

In June 1987, DIC and LBS settled their lawsuits regarding Kideo Video amicably out of court, due to the cross complaints that stemmed from the home video label beginning in 1985. The settlement allowed Lorimar Home Video to continue distributing for the home video market certain kids' animated programs, and called for LBS and DIC to have the right to enter into separate home video agreements independently of each other. In addition, the rights of one of the companies could be independent of each other, and also independent of Lorimar Home Video, and the issue of a joint account that LBS was managing and allegedly was being trafficked in and out of the Cayman Islands was raised. It was revealed that there was wrongdoing in the $250 million account co-owned by LBS.

In late July 1987, LBS Communications, on behalf of Westgate Entertainment, began marketing a $3 million, two-hour barter syndicated special on the Titanic; at the time, Westgate held exclusive rights to the taped footage of the attacks. The company had to feed the special to an ad-hoc network of TV stations on October 28, and at least 30 minutes of the two-hour special would be from Monte Carlo. It was decided that LBS would sell the telecast as part of a four-special barter package.

The company was known for distributing programs from DIC Entertainment and Columbia Pictures Television (including select material from the latter's predecessor Screen Gems). At the time, it and the latter operated a joint venture called Colex Enterprises. LBS also distributed the 1991 syndicated re-launch of Baywatch and was also known for distributing Elia Kazan-directed films originally released from 1945 to 1976. That year, LBS Communications boosted its distribution arm to allow stations to broadcast syndicated TV productions from outside production companies, and Paul Siegel would take over as president of the LBS Entertainment division. He had plans for advertising with Paramount Domestic Television and Coca-Cola Telecommunications, but the company then found itself in the cold, and the alternatives failed to materialize due to a management buyout of the company from Grey Advertising by Marvin Davis, who was a former owner of the 20th Century-Fox film studio.

Around the time that LBS' partnership with Columbia Pictures Television was winding down, LBS began to lose money, and in December 1991, LBS filed for Chapter 11 bankruptcy. As a result, the company ended up having to sell between 80 and 85 percent of its assets to its Baywatch distributor partner, the Scotti Brothers' All American Television.

=== TV programs ===
Title	Run	(Co-)Producer(s)	Current distributor(s)
Not for Women Only	1976–79		
Hot Fudge	1976–82		
The Andy Williams Show	1976–77	Pierre Cossette Enterprises	
Sha Na Na	1977–81	Pierre Cossette Enterprises	
Sorority '62	1978	Dick Clark Productions	
Hee Haw Honeys	1978–79	Yongestreet Productions	Ryman Hospitality Properties
The Health Field	1979–84		
Doctor Snuggles	1981	Polyscope	
Ulysses 31	1981	DIC Enterprises; TMS Entertainment	WildBrain
The Glen Campbell Music Show	1982–83	Pierre Cossette Productions; Gaylord Program Services	
In Search of...	1982–83	Alan Landsburg Productions	NBCUniversal Syndication Studios
Super Friends	1982–85	Hanna-Barbera; DC Comics	Warner Bros. Television
Inspector Gadget	1983–86	DIC Enterprises	WildBrain
Family	1983–84	Spelling/Goldberg Productions	Sony Pictures Television
How the West Was Won	1983–84	MGM Television	Warner Bros. Television
LBS Children's Theater	1983–85	Various	
The Greatest American Hero	1984–85	Stephen J. Cannell Productions	Shout! Factory
Heathcliff	1984–85	DIC Enterprises	WildBrain
Tales from the Darkside	1984–88	Laurel Entertainment; Jaygee Productions; Tribune Broadcasting	CBS Media Ventures
INDAY: It's A Great Life; All About Us; INDAY News; What's Hot? What's Not?	1985–86	Tribune Broadcasting	
M.A.S.K.	1985–86	DIC Enterprises	WildBrain
Care Bears	1985	DIC Enterprises	WildBrain
What's Happening Now!!	1985–88	Columbia Pictures Television	Sony Pictures Television
Kideo TV: Rainbow Brite; Popples; Ulysses 31; The Get Along Gang; Lady Lovelylocks and the Pixietails	1986–87	DIC Enterprises; Mattel	WildBrain
Canned Film Festival	1986	Young & Rubicam; Chelsea Communications	Keurig Dr Pepper; Fremantle
The New Gidget	1986–88	Ackerman/Riskin Productions; Columbia Pictures Television	Sony Pictures Television
The Adventures of Teddy Ruxpin	1986–87	DIC Enterprises; Atkinson Film-Arts	The Jim Henson Company
The Real Ghostbusters	1987–91	DIC Enterprises; Columbia Pictures Television	Sony Pictures Television
The New American Bandstand	1987–88	Dick Clark Productions	
Hardcastle and McCormick	1987–88	Stephen J. Cannell Productions	Sony Pictures Television
New Monkees	1987–88	Coca-Cola Telecommunications; Straybert Productions	Sony Pictures Television
Family Feud	1988–92	Mark Goodson Productions	Fremantle
Police Academy	1988–89	Ruby-Spears Productions; Warner Bros. Television	Warner Bros. Television
Crazy Like a Fox	1989	Columbia Pictures Television	Sony Pictures Television
The New Adventures of He-Man	1990	Jetlag Productions; Parafrance Communications	NBCUniversal Syndication Studios
Dragon Warrior	1990	Saban International	
Memories...Then and Now	1990–92	NBC News Productions	NBCUniversal Syndication Studios
Baywatch	1991–92	The Baywatch Company; Tower 12 Productions	Fremantle

==== Ad sales ====
- Fame
- Hollywood Squares (1986–89)
- The New Liar's Club
- This Is Your Life (1983–84)
- Too Close for Comfort

==== Colex Enterprises ====
- The Canterville Ghost (1986)
- Dennis the Menace
- The Donna Reed Show
- Eischied
- Family Reunion
- Father Knows Best
- The Flying Nun
- The George Burns and Gracie Allen Show
- Ghost Story
- Gidget
- Gidget's Summer Reunion (1985)
- Hawk
- Hazel
- Joe Forrester
- Jungle Jim
- Miracle of the Heart: A Boys Town Story (1986)
- The Monkees
- Route 66
- Wild Bill Hickok

=== Films ===
- Heathcliff: The Movie (1986) (released by Atlantic Entertainment Group and produced by DIC Entertainment and McNaught Syndicate)
- Care Bears Movie II: A New Generation (1986) (released by Columbia Pictures and produced by Nelvana)

=== TV specials ===
Title	Run	Co-producer	Current distributor
The Clairol Crown	1979–81		
Strawberry Shortcake: The World of Strawberry Shortcake (1980); Big Apple City (1981); Pets on Parade (1982); Housewarming Surprise (1983); The Baby Without a Name (1984); Strawberry Shortcake Meets the Berrykins (1985)	1980–85	Kenner Products; Mueller/Rosen Productions (#1-#3); Murakami-Wolf-Swenson (#1/#3); Perpetual Motion Pictures (#2); Nelvana (#4-#6)	CBS Media Ventures (#1-#2); WildBrain (#3-#6)
Peter and the Magic Egg	1983	Mueller/Rosen Productions; Murakami-Wolf-Swenson	CBS Media Ventures
The Care Bears in the Land Without Feelings	1983	Kenner Products; Atkinson Film-Arts	Cloudco Entertainment
The Care Bears Battle the Freeze Machine	1984	Kenner Products; Atkinson Film-Arts	Cloudco Entertainment
Poochie	1984	DIC Enterprises	WildBrain
The Adventures of the Get Along Gang	May 6, 1984	Nelvana	Cloudco Entertainment
GoBots: Battle for GoBotron	1984	Hanna-Barbera; Tonka	Warner Bros. Television
It Came Upon the Midnight Clear	December 8, 1984	Columbia Pictures Television	Sony Pictures Television
Peter and Paul	1985	Universal Television	NBCUniversal Syndication Studios
Hope Diamonds: My Favorite Brunette (1947); Road to Rio (1947); The Great Lover (1949); The Lemon Drop Kid (1951); Son of Paleface (1952); Road to Bali (1952); The Seven Little Foys (1955); Paris Holiday (1958); The Private Navy of Sgt. O'Farrell (1968); How to Commit Marriage (1969); Cancel My Reservation (1972)	1986	Hope Enterprises	Sony Pictures Television
The Story of Rock 'n Roll	1987	Chelsea Communications	Fremantle
Return to the Titanic...Live	October 28, 1987	Westgate Communications	Fremantle
Bonanza: The Next Generation	1988	Bonanza Ventures; Gaylord Productions	Entertainment One
Exploring Pyschic Powers...Live	1989		Fremantle
The Billy Martin Celebrity Roast	September 30, 1989	Multiview Productions	Fremantle
It Nearly Wasn't Christmas	1989	Ventura Entertainment Group	Fremantle
