= Strawberry Shortcake: Housewarming Surprise =

1983 animated TV special

- Genre: Animation; Comedy; Family; Cartoon series
- Written by: Peter Sauder
- Directed by: Raymond Jafelice; Animation director: Gian Celestri
- Starring: Russi Taylor; Chris Wiggins
- Theme music composer: Patricia Cullen; Songs composed by: John Sebastian; Performed by: John Sebastian; Phil Galdston; Bill Keith; Ben Sebastian; Sharon McQueen; Produced by: Phil Galdston
- Country of origin: Canada
- Original language: English

Production
- Producers: Michael Hirsh; Patrick Loubert; Clive A. Smith
- Editors: Scott LaBarge; Rob Kirkpatrick; Tom Jorrin
- Running time: 23 minutes
- Production companies: MAD Productions; Nelvana Limited; Those Characters from Cleveland (uncredited)

Original release
- Network: Syndication
- Release: March 31, 1983

Strawberry Shortcake: Housewarming Surprise is a 1983 Canadian-American animated television special that first premiered on March 31 in New York City and on April 1 in Los Angeles. This is the first Strawberry Shortcake television special produced by Nelvana Limited and the first to be distributed by Lexington Broadcast Services Company. The following year in 1984, Strawberry Shortcake: Housewarming Surprise was released on VHS.

== Synopsis ==
Strawberry Shortcake: Housewarming Surprise chronicles Strawberry Shortcake's move into a new house. Her friends, including several new ones she met on a recent "around the world" vacation come to visit her. The villains attempt to ruin the fun by stealing all the recipes Strawberry's international friends bring with them.

== Cast ==
Name	Character	Source
Russi Taylor	Strawberry Shortcake	
Robert Ridgely	Peculiar Purple Pieman	
Jack Blum	Captain Cackle / Additional voices	
Melleny Brown	Lime Chiffron	
Jeri Craden	Sour Grapes	
Jeannie Elias	Huckleberry Pie / Parfait / Lem	
Susan Roman	Blueberry Muffin / Crepe Suzette / Ada	
Chris Wiggins	Mr. Sun / Narrator	

== Production ==
Housewarming Surprise was the first Strawberry Shortcake special produced by Nelvana, the previous three having been produced by Romeo Muller, Robert L. Rosen, and Fred Wolf. Bernard Loomis and Carole MacGillvray served as executive producers.

== Release ==
The special premiered on March 31, 1983 on WCBS-TV in New York City, and on April 1 on KTLA in Los Angeles. It was subsequently released on VHS by Family Home Entertainment in early 1984.

Preceded by Strawberry Shortcake: Pets on Parade	1980's Strawberry Shortcake specials 1983	Succeeded by Strawberry Shortcake and the Baby Without a Name
