= Peter and the Magic Egg =

1983 animated TV special

- Written by: Romeo Muller
- Directed by: Fred Wolf
- Starring: Ray Bolger
- Voices of: Al Eisenmann; Joan Gerber; Bob Holt; Robert Ridgely; Russi Taylor
- Music by: Howard Kaylan; Mark Volman
- Country of origin: United States
- Original language: English

Production
- Executive producer: Robert L. Rosen
- Producers: Romeo Muller; Fred Wolf
- Cinematography: Ted Bemiller & Sons
- Editor: Rich Harrison
- Running time: 24 minutes
- Production companies: Murakami-Wolf-Swenson; Mueller/Rosen Productions

Original release
- Network: Syndication
- Release: March 23, 1983

Peter and the Magic Egg is a 1983 animated musical Easter television special produced by Murakami-Wolf-Swenson. It is narrated by Uncle Amos the egg, voiced by Ray Bolger. The special aired in syndication on March 23, 1983.

This special was produced as a promotional tie-in for Paas Easter egg dye.

== Plot ==
The Doppler family, Pennsylvania Dutch farmers, are in debt to Tobias Tinwhiskers. Tobias Toot, a local farmer that successfully mechanized his farm leading to him taking over neighboring farms, the local bank and the town itself, previously had been converted into Tobias Tinwhiskers as he so loved machines, and he underwent a procedure to become mechanical altogether himself. Mother Nature sends a baby, Peter Paas, to help the Dopplers out of their desperate situation.

Peter Paas grows up and works on the farm and, in order to pay the mortgage on the farm to Tinwhiskers, he arranges a contract with the Easter Bunny to supply colored eggs for Easter. He is helped by the cast of anthropomorphic farm animals to produce and dye the eggs and make the annual mortgage payment on Easter day. Tinwhiskers, enraged that he cannot repossess the farm, challenges Peter to a ploughing contest and arranges for Peter to fall down a well. Peter remains in a coma and sadness hangs over the farm. The animals went to Mother Nature for help as she gave them an egg to hatch which will awake Peter. The egg hatches into a Kookibird bringing laughter back to the farms. This wakes Peter and returns Tinwhiskers to human form. Tobias Toot gives back the town, renamed Paasville, and goes to work for the Dopplers while Peter leaves the farm to return to Mother Nature to help other families in need.

== Cast ==
- Ray Bolger as Uncle Amos Egg
- Al Eisenmann as Peter Paas
- Joan Gerber as Mama Doppler / Feathers / Queen Bessie / Mother Nature
- Bob Holt as Papa Doppler / Kookybird
- Robert Ridgely as Tobias Tinwhiskers / Cotton
- Russi Taylor as Lollichop
- Charles Woolf as Terrence / King Bossy

== Trivia ==
- This was the last special produced by Muller/Rosen.

== See also ==
- List of Easter television episodes
