= The Strawberry Shortcake Movie: Sky's the Limit =

- Directed by: Michael Hack; Mucci Fassett
- Written by: Karl Geurs; Lisa Melbye
- Based on: Strawberry Shortcake's Berry Bitty Adventures
- Produced by: Sarah Finn
- Starring: Anna Cummer; Ashleigh Ball; Ingrid Nilson; Janyse Jaud; Britt McKillip; Andrea Libman; Paul Dobson
- Music by: Chip Whitewood; Marco Luciani
- Production companies: American Greetings; AG Properties; MoonScoop Entertainment
- Distributed by: 20th Century Fox Home Entertainment
- Release dates: July 31, 2009 (Los Angeles, CA); September 15, 2009 (United States)
- Running time: 72 minutes
- Country: United States
- Language: English

The Strawberry Shortcake Movie: Sky's the Limit is a 2009 American computer-animated adventure film directed by Michael Hack and Mucci Fassett. It serves as the pilot for Strawberry Shortcake's Berry Bitty Adventures, a series that aired one year after the film's release. It also takes place after a pilot cartoon based on it.

== Plot ==
After the Berryworks water supply is blocked by a giant rock brought down by a lightning storm, Strawberry Shortcake and her friends are desperate to find a water source before they will have to evacuate their hometown, Berry Bitty City, for good to live in another region far away, but also a large source of water. She then hears the legend about an ancient artifact found in the mountains to expose eternal water when revealed to sunlight. She and her friends head off on a quest to retrieve the object and try to save the city with it, but unknown to them, the main "legend" is actually a false hoax.

== Voice cast ==
- Anna Cummer as Strawberry Shortcake
- Ashleigh Ball as Plum Pudding and Berrykin #2
- Ingrid Nilson as Raspberry Torte
- Janyse Jaud as Orange Blossom and Berrykin #3
- Britt McKillip as Blueberry Muffin and Small Berrykin
- Andrea Libman as Lemon Meringue and Princess Berrykin
- Paul Dobson as Mr. Longface, Construction Berrykin and Berrykin #1

== Production ==
In 2008, Hasbro was made the master toy partner for the Strawberry Shortcake franchise, taking over from Playmates. American Greetings then announced a new series to debut in 2010, but would first produce a pilot cartoon and a film to introduce the new setting.

The film first began production in August and ended later in June 2009. It was first screened in the FOX Studios in Los Angeles on July 31. It was then directly released on DVD by 20th Century Fox Home Entertainment on September 15 of the same year. Kidtoon Films released the film theatrically in April 2011.

=== Release and broadcast ===
In France, it made its premiere as a TV film on Playhouse Disney on December 5, 2009 and was later released on DVD on December 9 by M6 Video.

== Reception ==
Sierra Filucci of Common Sense Media gave the film two stars, criticizing the characters for their "Uber-girly" personalities.
