= The Banana Splits in Hocus Pocus Park =

1972 television film

- Genre: Comedy; Adventure; Fantasy
- Written by: Heywood Kling
- Directed by: Charles A. Nichols (animation segment); Tom Boutross (live action segment)
- Starring: Daws Butler; Joan Gerber; Allan Melvin; Howard Morris; Michele Tobin; Paul Winchell; Don Messick
- Music by: Hoyt Curtin
- Country of origin: United States
- Original language: English

Production
- Producers: William Hanna; Joseph Barbera
- Production location: Kings Island
- Editor: Warner E. Leighton
- Running time: 44 minutes
- Production company: Hanna-Barbera Productions

Original release
- Network: ABC
- Release: November 25, 1972

The Banana Splits in Hocus Pocus Park is a 1972 live-action/animated television film made by Hanna-Barbera featuring the characters from The Banana Splits television series. Mixing live action sequences shot at Kings Island amusement park in Cincinnati, Ohio, with animation, the film follows the Banana Splits as they attempt to rescue a young girl who is kidnapped by a power-hungry witch.

The Banana Splits in Hocus Pocus Park was first broadcast as an episode on the weekly program The ABC Saturday Superstar Movie on November 25, 1972, and continued to air sporadically well into the 2000s, via cable networks Cartoon Network and Boomerang, both of which also aired reruns of its parent series. On October 11, 2026, the film has aired its restored version on MeTV Toons, as part of "Spooktacular Sundays", its block lineup for every Sunday in October.

== Plot ==
The Banana Splits are working as tour guides at Kings Island, but find no luck in getting any customers, until a girl named Susie approaches them to go on their tour. Meanwhile, a witch wants to turn Susie into a witch like herself, so she uses a floating balloon to lure the girl into her (animated) world.

When the balloon comes through a magic billboard and into the real world, Susie immediately chases after it around the park and into the billboard, with the Banana Splits going after her. Once Susie arrives, she gets captured by two inept wizards named Hocus and Pocus, who work for the Witch and trap her in a hat. The two learn about the Splits trying to find Susie, and attempt to stop them from their search, but end up failing every time mostly due to them arguing over which of them came up with the idea. Eventually, one of Hocus and Pocus' ideas get them trapped, and the Banana Splits find them and free them. Hocus and Pocus now have a change of heart and take the Splits to Susie's location, only to find that she has been kidnapped by the Witch and taken to her castle.

Finally finding the Witch's castle, the Splits and the wizards try many different ways to get inside, and have one comical failure after another. After they finally they get in, the witch tells them that in order to save Susie, they have to face against a knight, and gives them a suit of armour so one of them will be the knight, resulting in Fleegle and Bingo being the horse and Drooper being the knight. however, they become helpless upon discovering the knight is a robot on a giant mechanical horse, which chases the trio.

Eventually, Susie's able to outsmart the Witch, and makes the horse malfunction and throw the knight off of it, defeating it. Finally reuniting with Susie, the group uses the horse to escape and get back to the magic billboard, while they're unfortunately getting chased by the Witch. The witch uses her magic to make a wall to block the billboard, but the group jumps over the wall while the horse and Witch crash into it. The Banana Splits and Susie return to their world, say farewell to Hocus and Pocus, and the Splits perform their scheduled concert at the amusement park, where they sing "Doin' the Banana Split."

== Cast ==
- Paul Winchell as Fleegle and Tree
- Daws Butler as Bingo, Frog, and Octopus
- Allan Melvin as Drooper
- Don Messick as Dragon
- Michele Tobin as Susie
- Howard Morris as Hocus and Pocus
- Joan Gerber as the Wicked Witch
