= Strawberry Shortcake: The Sweet Dreams Movie =

- DVD cover
- Directed by: Karen Hyden
- Written by: Carter Crocker
- Based on: Strawberry Shortcake by: Muriel Fahrion; American Greetings
- Starring: See below
- Music by: Andy Street (score/songs); Judy Rothman (lyrics)
- Production companies: DIC Entertainment; American Greetings
- Distributed by: Kidtoon Films
- Release date: October 7, 2006
- Running time: 75 minutes
- Country: United States
- Language: English

Strawberry Shortcake: The Sweet Dreams Movie is a 2006 American animated family fantasy adventure musical film produced by DIC Entertainment and released theatrically in select cities on October 7, 2006, by Kidtoon Films. It was the first feature-length film to feature the eponymous American Greetings property, and stars the voices of Sarah Heinke, Rachel Ware, Nils Haaland, and Bridget Robbins. The film also includes the first appearance of the villain, the Peculiar Purple Pieman, since Nelvana's Strawberry Shortcake specials from more than twenty years earlier.

== Plot ==
While having a sleepover together, Strawberry and her friends travel to the Land of Dreams on a sea-plane like boat built by Ginger Snap, where they must help stop the Purple Pieman, Sour Grapes and their army of nightmares from ruling the earth.

== Cast ==
- Sarah Heinke – Strawberry Shortcake
- Rachel Ware – Angel Cake
- Samantha Triba – Ginger Snap
- DeJare Barfield – Orange Blossom
- Greer McKain – Raspberry Torte
- Mary Waltman – Lemon Meringue
- Anna Jordan – Custard the Cat
- Nils Haaland – Pupcake the Dog / Sleepbug
- Cork Ramer – Purple Pieman
- Bridget Robbins – Sour Grapes
- Kim Carlson – P.J.
- John Lee – Sandman

== Production ==
DIC Entertainment announced the first news of The Sweet Dreams Movie in June 2005, as the Strawberry Shortcake franchise was celebrating its 25th anniversary. The script was written by Carter Crocker, whose previous credits included the Disney sequels Return to Never Land and The Jungle Book 2.

During the film's production, storyboards were drawn by DiC crew members in Los Angeles and shipped to Omaha, Nebraska's Ware House Productions. A line-up of young actors, mostly from Omaha, recorded their lines in four days. Another two were spent on the score, composed by Los Angeles musician Andy Street.

== Release ==
The Sweet Dreams Movie received its world premiere at Omaha's Rose Theater for the Performing Arts on October 30, 2006. American Greetings, DIC, the local Children's Hospital (where it was also screened) and Radio Disney sponsored the event. Special showings of the film took place at Cleveland's Toonaloo event on October 1, at the Los Angeles International Children's Film Festival on October 8, and at the Avalon Theatre in Washington, D.C., on January 27, 2007.

The Sweet Dreams Movie was released as part of Kidtoon Films' monthly program on October 7, 2006, during weekend matinees in select venues. The film was only shown digitally, and not printed on traditional 35mm stock; had no major press reviews during its stay in theaters; and was designated as a direct-to-DVD feature in the first place. Hence, as with all of Kidtoon's past films, it is not considered a legitimate theatrical release, according to animation expert Jerry Beck on his Cartoon Research site.

In a January 2007 interview with Animation Magazine, Leslie Nelson, a member of DiC's European unit, said that Sweet Dreams was the biggest success for the Kidtoon program, beating the sales for an undisclosed record holder by 20%. During its October release, over two million tickets were sold.

The Sweet Dreams Movie debuted on DVD in North America on February 6, 2007, courtesy of 20th Century Fox Home Entertainment. Although there are no special features on the disc itself, every copy includes a special package of organic strawberry seeds.

The film had its first known international appearance when Disney Channel Asia picked it up for its "The Wonderful World of Disney" movie slot in March 2007. The channel has since repeated screenings of the film several times, but the film was not released onto VideoCDs in the Asian region until December, well over 10 months after the North American DVD release and over a year after its US theatrical debut.

== Reception ==
The day before its DVD premiere, R.J. Carter of the home entertainment site, The Trades, gave The Sweet Dreams Movie a B− grade. He commented on the storyline: "It's not exactly [compelling]. It's silly, and simple, and syrupy sweet—which is all that's called for in a Strawberry Shortcake adventure". On the computer animation, he went on to say: "It is not done so with an attempt to go for realism, however, as the finished product looks more like a cast of plastic moulded [dolls from the franchise] than little girls. Think of any of the Barbie DVD animated adventures of late, and you'll be in the right ballpark".

Some days later, Mike Long of DVD Talk expressed disappointment over the film's story, design and ending, as well as its songs, and rated it one star out of five.

== Merchandise ==
20th Century Fox Home Entertainment released The Sweet Dreams Movie on DVD on February 6, 2007.

Grosset & Dunlap has published at least three books based on the film, all of which contain actual stills from the production. They are The Sweet Dreams Movie Storybook by Megan E. Bryant (ISBN 0-448-44423-2), Dream Big! by Sierra Harimann (ISBN 0-448-44425-9), and a sticker book entitled A Berry Big Adventure, edited by Molly Kempf (ISBN 0-448-44424-0).

Koch Records released a soundtrack album of the film on August 30, 2006. Nine songs were featured on the album, including "Sweet Dreams" and "All It Takes". Additionally, two songs unrelated to the film, "You're my Berry Best Friend" (from the regular episode Peppermint's Pet Peeve) and "Tell Me A Story" (a bonus music video from the Adventures in Ice-cream Island DVD), were included.

Majesco released the video game Strawberry Shortcake: Sweet Dreams for the Game Boy Advance on August 24, 2006. It was developed by Gorilla Systems, and incorporated stills of actual scenes from the film. IGN reviewer Ed Lewis gave it a rating of 5.1/10. Another game based on the film, Adventures in the Land of Dreams, was released by Game Factory for the PlayStation 2 on January 10, 2007. A port of the game for Microsoft Windows was also released in 2007.

Both Strawberry Shortcake: Sweet Dreams for the GBA and Strawberry Shortcake: Adventure in the Land of Dreams for the PS2 and Windows were launched with the title Strawberry Shortcake: The Sweet Dreams Game in the North American market.
