= Thanksgiving in the Land of Oz =

1980 American animated Thanksgiving special

- Screenshot from the special
- Genre: Animated TV special
- Written by: Romeo Muller
- Directed by: Charles Swenson
- Voices of: Sid Caesar; Mischa Bond; Robert Ridgely; Joan Gerber; Frank Nelson; Lurene Tuttle; Charles Woolf
- Composers: Stephen J. Lawrence; David Campbell
- Country of origin: United States
- Original language: English

Production
- Executive producer: Robert L. Rosen
- Producers: Romeo Muller; Fred Wolf; Charles Swenson
- Running time: 30 minutes
- Production company: Muller-Rosen Productions in association with Murakami-Wolf-Swenson Films

Original release
- Network: CBS
- Release: November 15, 1980

Thanksgiving in the Land of Oz is an animated Thanksgiving TV special that first aired on CBS on November 15, 1980. The special was retitled Dorothy in the Land of Oz, with some of the references to Thanksgiving cut out, for the CBS repeat in 1981.

== Plot ==
Aunt Em is getting ready for a Thanksgiving feast when Dorothy spots someone getting away with the mince pie. It's the Wizard of Oz, who's created a new, green turkey-shaped balloon in the hopes of renting it out for a Thanksgiving parade. The balloon slips away into the sky, with Dorothy and Toto holding onto it, and they drift to Oz.

Jack Pumpkinhead welcomes Dorothy to Oz, but there's a new threat haunting the land: Tyrone, the Terrible Toy Tinker, who brings Dorothy's turkey balloon to life and plans to take over the Emerald City. Jack and Dorothy need to get to Tyrone's tower and stop him. They find that Dorothy's pie has come to life, and calls itself U.N. Krust: a pie that uses a different accent every time it speaks.

Walking to the tower, Dorothy tells Jack Pumpkinhead about Thanksgiving, lauding the Pilgrims' pioneering spirit. Along the way, they run into more new friends: the Hungry Tiger, who turns out to be a vegetarian, and Tic Toc (sic) the mechanical man. As the group nears the tower, the green turkey picks up Dorothy and brings her to Tyrone. Dorothy scolds Tyrone for being a bad person, and encourages him to use his powers to make toys for Christmas instead.

A victorious Dorothy is brought to the Emerald City, where she meets Queen Ozma. Ozma rewards Dorothy by bringing her uncle and aunt to Oz forever, so they can have a Thanksgiving feast for all of their Ozite friends.

The special included three songs: "Oz Can Be", "Beans in Your Button" and "Christmas, Toys and Oz".

== Cast ==
- Sid Caesar: The Wizard of Oz, U.N. Krust
- Mischa Bond: Dorothy
- Robert Ridgely: Jack Pumpkinhead, Tyrone the Terrible Toy Tinker
- Joan Gerber: Tic-Toc, Ozma, Queen of Oz
- Frank Nelson: The Hungry Tiger
- Lurene Tuttle: Aunt Em
- Charles Woolf: Uncle Henry, Toto
- Maitzi Morgan
- Julie Cohen

== Distribution ==
The original special aired on CBS on November 15, 1980. The show was retitled Dorothy in the Land of Oz for its second CBS outing on December 10, 1981 and forever after. The special aired on Showtime in November 1985 and November 1986, and on HBO in 1986 and 1987.

== Reception ==
In A Brief Guide to Oz, Paul Simpson wrote, "This animated special isn't well regarded, even though it incorporates some elements of the original Baum saga that rarely turn up elsewhere."

In The Road to Wicked: The Marketing and Consumption of Oz from L. Frank Baum to Broadway, Kent Drummond, Susan Aronstein and Terri L. Rittenburg wrote, "Thanksgiving in Oz introduced what was to become a recurring theme of loss and return in post-70s Oz narratives. If MGM offered Oz to the young at heart, Thanksgiving in Oz used Oz to recall adults to their true selves."
