= Colex Enterprises =

Defunct joint venture between Columbia Pictures Television and LBS Communications

Colex Enterprises, Inc.
- Type: Joint venture
- Industry: Television syndication
- Founded: January 1984; 42 years ago
- Defunct: April 1987; 39 years ago
- Fate: Dissolved
- Headquarters: Burbank, California, United States
- Key people: Dan Greenblatt
- Owner: The Coca-Cola Company; Grey Advertising
- Parent: CPT Holdings; LBS Communications

Colex Enterprises, Inc. was a joint venture between Columbia Pictures Television and LBS Communications, Inc., active from January 1984 to April 1987. The venture's name is a portmanteau of the two companies' names, Columbia and Lexington, the latter derived from LBS's initials/original name, Lexington Broadcast Services.

== History ==
In December 1982, Columbia Pictures Television agreed to license domestic distribution rights to the television series Family to LBS. Family was subsequently added to Colex's roster when the venture was officially formed as an operational entity, and the first new series added to Colex's roster was Gidget. The venture was designed to handle syndication of various properties, mostly on behalf of CPT, on an advertiser-supported barter basis and a cash basis.

Following LBS' name change, the billing for this entity was initially "A joint venture of Columbia Pictures Television and LBS Communications Inc." In 1985, this was temporarily changed to "A joint venture of LBS Communications Inc. and Columbia Pictures Television," only to revert to the previous billing within a few months.

Colex formed a squad of package monikers in November 1985:

- Colex First-Run - new material
- Colex Premiere Movies - various movies such as eleven post-1947 Bob Hope theatrical films (collectively "Hope Diamonds") and telemovies such as Family Reunion and The Best Place to Be
- The Colex Collection (a.k.a. Colex Off-Net) - newer off-network material with proven appeal
- The Colex 3-Pack - miniseries
- The Colex Classics - various classic series

A year later, a duo of rearrangements with the package monikers occurred:

- Colex Premiere Movies was renamed to Colex Films.
- Family was moved to The Colex Classics from Colex Off-Net, while Ghost Story/Circle of Fear was moved to the latter from the former.

By the very beginning of 1987, following the formation of Coca-Cola Telecommunications (from a merger between sister joint venture The Television Program Source and CPT's first-run syndication unit), the billing for this entity was changed to "A joint venture of LBS Communications Inc. and Columbia Pictures Television, in association with Coca-Cola Telecommunications." Colex was eventually dissolved by the very end of April 1987, nearly eight months before Coca-Cola sold its entertainment business to Tri-Star Pictures, which it partially owned at the time, in turn leading to Tri-Star being renamed as Columbia Pictures Entertainment, over a week before Coca-Cola Telecommunications was dissolved.

The name remains a trademark of Sony Pictures Television.

== Programming ==
=== As an operational entity ===
==== Television series ====
- Father Knows Best (1954–1960)
- The George Burns and Gracie Allen Show (1950–1958)
- Route 66 (1960–1964)
- Gidget (1965–1966)
- The Flying Nun (1967–1970)
- Ghost Story/Circle of Fear (1972–1973)
- Bob & Carol & Ted & Alice (1973)
- Family (1976–1980)
- Eischied (1979–1980)
- Father Murphy (1981–1983)
- Hardcastle and McCormick (1983–1986)

==== Movies ====
- The Care Bears Movie (1985)
- The Care Bears Movie II: A New Generation (1986)
- Heathcliff: The Movie (1986)

==== Telemovies ====
- Gidget Gets Married (1972)
- Three Wishes for Jamie (1987)

=== Post-dissolution ===
Following the dissolution of Colex as an operational entity, the underlying agreement between Columbia Pictures Television and LBS lingered for at least another few years, even being renewed and slightly expanded in November 1988, only to eventually end sometime after LBS was folded into All American Television. In addition to most of the properties previously distributed by Colex Enterprises, the following properties were "distributed by LBS in association with Columbia Pictures Television" upon the renewal and expansion of the agreement.

==== Previously not in syndication ====
- Matt Helm (1975–1976)
- Gibbsville (1976)
- David Cassidy: Man Undercover (1978–1979)
- Salvage 1 (1979)
- The Rousters (1983–1984)
- Crazy Like a Fox (1984–1986)

==== Previously distributed explicitly by Columbia Pictures Television ====
- Casey Jones (1957–1958)
- What's Happening!! (1976–1979)
- Code Red (1981–1982)

==== Previously cleared by Columbia Pictures Television with advertising sales by LBS ====
- What's Happening Now!! (1985–1988)
- The Real Ghostbusters (1986–1991)
