= Joan Gerber =

American voice actress (1935–2011)

- Born: Joanellen Gerber; July 29, 1935; Detroit, Michigan, U.S.
- Died: August 22, 2011 (aged 76); Los Angeles, California, U.S.
- Occupation: Voice actress
- Years active: 1959–2003
- Spouse: Frank Dowse (m. 1957; div. 1961)
- Children: 1

Joan "Joanie" Gerber (July 29, 1935 – August 22, 2011) was an American voice actress who provided voices for a variety of cartoons. She was the voice of Irma Boyle in Wait Till Your Father Gets Home, Medusa on The New Fantastic Four, Blueberry Muffin and Apple Dumplin' in The World of Strawberry Shortcake, Richie's mom and Irona the Robot Maid on Richie Rich and Bentina Beakley in DuckTales.

Gerber's most challenging voice role was "all the children in a Japanese train wreck" for a Godzilla television episode. She voiced Freddy the Flute and other characters for H.R. Pufnstuf, and identified Freddy as a favorite role. She also voiced Ozma, the Queen of Oz, in the TV special Thanksgiving in the Land of Oz.

She was described as talented and possessing a "golden throat" and a "splendid singing voice". She also voiced a syndicated series of roughly one-minute radio spots, "The Story Lady," that parodied children's programming.

== Personal life and death ==
She had one daughter from her marriage to Frank Dowse. She later dated fellow actor Regis Cordic.

Gerber died on August 22, 2011, at the age of 76.

== Filmography ==
- 1959: Matty's Funday Funnies (TV series): Additional voices
- 1960: The Bugs Bunny Show (TV series): Additional voices
- 1965: Roger Ramjet (TV series): Dee / Lotta Love (voice)
- 1965: Corn on the Cop: Granny, Ghost Trick-or-Treater (voice)
- 1966: The Pique Poquette of Paris: Woman (voice)
- 1966: The Super 6 (TV series, voice)
- 1968: Mitzi (TV)
- 1969: The Pink Panther Show, (TV, "voices")
- 1969: Sesame Street (TV series): Voices
- 1969: H.R. Pufnstuf (TV series): Freddie the Flute, Grandmother Clock (voice)
- 1970: Pufnstuf (film) : Freddie the Flute, Dowager Tree, Granddaughter Clock (voice)
- 1970: Shinbone Alley (voice)
- 1970: Lancelot Link, Secret Chimp (TV series): Mata Hairi (voice)
- 1970: Tales of Washington Irving (TV, voice)
- 1970: The Bugaloos (TV, various)
- 1971: Lidsville (TV, various)
- 1971: The Point! (TV, voice)
- 1971: Arnold's Closet Revue (TV)
- 1971: Help!... It's the Hair Bear Bunch! (TV series, voice)
- 1972: Wait Till Your Father Gets Home (TV series): Sara Whitaker / Irma Boyle (voice)
- 1972: Bury Me an Angel: Op's Voice (voice)
- 1972: The Barkleys (TV series): Agnes Barkley/ Lulu (voice)
- 1972: The New Scooby-Doo Movies (TV series)
- 1972: The Houndcats (TV series): Various (voice)
- 1972: The Banana Splits in Hocus Pocus Park (Film): Wicked Witch (Voice)
- 1973: Kloot's Kounty: Shepherdess (voice)
- 1973: The Boa Friend (voice)
- 1973: Charlotte's Web: Mrs. Zuckerman / Mrs. Fussy (voice)
- 1974: The Badge and the Beautiful (voice)
- 1974: The Magical Mystery Trip Through Little Red's Head (TV): Mother / Adeline / Diane (voice)
- 1974: The Nine Lives of Fritz the Cat (voice)
- 1974: These Are the Days (TV series, voice)
- 1974: Partridge Family 2200 A.D. (TV series): Shirley Partridge (voice)
- 1975: M–O–N–E–Y Spells Love (voice)
- 1975: Goldilox & the Three Hoods (voice)
- 1975: The Oddball Couple (TV series): Goldie (voice)
- 1976: The Scooby-Doo/Dynomutt Hour (TV series, voice)
- 1976: Dynomutt, Dog Wonder (TV series): Additional voices (voice)
- 1976: Clue Club (TV series)
- 1976: The Pink Panther Laugh and the Half Hour and Half Show (TV series): Various characters (voice)
- 1977: Fred Flintstone and Friends (TV series, voice)
- 1977: I Am the Greatest: The Adventures of Muhammad Ali (TV series, voice)
- 1977: CB Bears (TV series): Various (voice)
- 1977: Captain Caveman and the Teen Angels (TV series): Additional Voices (voice)
- 1977: The Mouse and His Child: The Elephant (voice)
- 1978: Jana of the Jungle (TV series, voice)
- 1978: Fantastic Four (TV series, voice)
- 1978: The Puppy Who Wanted a Boy (TV, voice)
- 1978: The All-New Pink Panther Show (TV series, voice)
- 1978: The All New Popeye Hour (TV series, voice)
- 1978: Christmas at Walt Disney World (TV): Evil Fairy (voice)
- 1979: J-Men Forever (voice)
- 1979: The Puppy's Great Adventure (TV, voice)
- 1979: Nutcracker Fantasy: Mice (voice)
- 1979: Scooby-Doo and Scrappy-Doo (1979 TV series) (TV series): Lefty Callahan / Vampire Lady of the Bay / Mrs. Cornell (voice)
- 1979: Scooby-Doo Goes Hollywood (TV): Lavonne / Second Woman / Waitress (voice)
- 1980: Thanksgiving in the Land of Oz: Tic Toc / Ozma (voice)
- 1980: The Richie Rich/Scooby-Doo Hour (TV series): Mrs. Regina Rich / Irona the Maid (voice)
- 1981: Strawberry Shortcake in Big Apple City (TV): Apricot, Blueberry Muffin, Apple Dumplin' (voice)
- 1981: The Kwicky Koala Show (TV series, voice)
- 1981: The Smurfs (TV series, voice)
- 1982: Strawberry Shortcake: Pets on Parade
- 1982: Puff and the Incredible Mr. Nobody (TV, voice)
- 1982: Heidi's Song: Rottenmeier (voice)
- 1983: The Dukes (TV series, voice)
- 1983: Monchhichis (TV series, voice)
- 1983: Peter and the Magic Egg (TV) Mama Doppler / Feathers / Queen Bessie / Mother Nature (voice)
- 1984: Snorks (TV series): Mrs. Kelp (voice)
- 1984: Trapper John, M.D. (TV series): Annie the Robot (voice)
- 1985: Explorers: Special Vocal Effects (voice)
- 1985: The 13 Ghosts of Scooby-Doo (TV series, voice)
- 1986: The Bugs Bunny and Tweety Show (TV series): Various Characters (voice)
- 1987: DuckTales: Treasure of the Golden Suns (TV movie): Mrs. Beakley / Skiddles' Mother (voice)
- 1987: DuckTales (TV series): Mrs. Bentina Beakley, Glittering Goldie, additional Voices (voice)
- 1987: Teenage Mutant Ninja Turtles: Shreeka, Agatha Marbles, additional Voices (voice)
- 1988: Scooby-Doo and the Reluctant Werewolf (TV): Dreadonia, Woman at Store (voice)
- 1988: Street of Dreams (TV)
- 1989: Super DuckTales (TV movie): Mrs. Beakley (voice)
- 1990: Tiny Toon Adventures: Gotcha Grabmore (voice)
- 1990: DuckTales the Movie: Treasure of the Lost Lamp: Mrs. Beakley (voice)
- 1990: Gravedale High (TV series, voice)
- 1990: TaleSpin (TV series): Helga (voice)
- 1992: Capitol Critters (TV series): Additional Voices (voice)
- 1993: Goof Troop (TV series)
- 1993: I Yabba-Dabba Do! (TV): Additional Voices (voice)
- 1994: A Flintstones Christmas Carol: Additional Voices (voice)
- 1995: That's Warner Bros.! (TV series): Various characters (voice)
- 1996: The Bugs n' Daffy Show (TV series): Various Characters (voice)
- 1999: The Stan Freberg Commercials (video): (segment "Hitchcock Spoof")
- 2003: Duck Dodgers (TV series): Klunkin Woman (voice)
