= The World of Strawberry Shortcake =

1980 animated TV special

- Title card
- Genre: Animated special
- Written by: Romeo Muller
- Directed by: Charles Swenson
- Starring: Russi Taylor; Romeo Muller; Robert Ridgely; Julie McWhirter; Joan Gerber
- Theme music composer: Mark Volman; Howard Kaylan; Performed by: Flo & Eddie; Lyrics: Romeo Muller
- Countries of origin: United States; Japan
- Original languages: English; Japanese

Production
- Producers: Romeo Muller; Charles Swenson; Fred Wolf
- Cinematography: Ted McMiller; Meguro Hirochi
- Editor: Rich Harrison
- Running time: 23 minutes
- Production companies: Muller/Rosen; Murakami-Wolf-Swenson; Toei Animation; RLR Associates (uncredited); Those Characters from Cleveland (uncredited)
- Budget: US$400,000

Original release
- Network: Syndication
- Release: March 28, 1980

The World of Strawberry Shortcake is a 1980 animated television special written by Romeo Muller, directed by Charles Swenson, and produced by Swenson, Muller, and Fred Wolf. Starring the voices of Russi Taylor, Romeo Muller, Robert Ridgely, Julie McWhirter, and Joan Gerber, it was made by Murakami-Wolf-Swenson in the United States in partnership with Toei Animation in Japan. The soundtrack was written and performed by Flo & Eddie of the rock group, The Turtles, for the opening theme of the series.

The plot follows the title character, Strawberry Shortcake, who lives in a fictional place called Strawberryland. In the special, narrated by Mr. Sun, she and her friends celebrate her sixth birthday, and with preparations for her party underway, a villain called the Peculiar Purple Pieman plots to steal the berries from Strawberry's home for making the "pies" that Strawberry baked.

The special was produced and sponsored by the Kenner toy company, as the first special to feature the American Greetings character Strawberry Shortcake. Despite bypassing network television, it aired on March 28, 1980, having been syndicated across over ninety American cities, and was later released on 16mm film, VHS, Betamax, and DVD. The special received two positive reviews in the School Library Journal: in 1983 and 2007.

== Plot ==
Strawberry Shortcake lives in a place called Strawberryland, with her pink calico cat Custard, and her house resembles a strawberry shortcake. Her friends – Huckleberry Pie, Blueberry Muffin, Raspberry Tart, Plum Puddin' and toddler Apple Dumplin' – also live close by. One morning, during their Market Day, Strawberry's friends discuss plans for her birthday.

Meanwhile, a tall lanky baker named the Purple Pieman sends his crows, "berry birds", to steal some berries for his pies. Strawberry tries shooing the flock away with her broom, but a moving tree helps out as a scarecrow, and she thanks him for helping. In desperation, the Pieman heads down to Strawberryland himself to get his supply, dressed as a kind old peddler.

By noon, Strawberry calls her friends over for lunch, but they leave her behind and go to Lilac Park to prepare for her surprise party. Soon after, the disguised Pieman meets her and offers watering cans for sale. To his chagrin, Strawberry cannot afford to buy a magical one guaranteed to produce strawberries seven feet tall. Assisted by Lucky Bug, Huckleberry's ladybug aide, he goes to the Park, where Huckleberry pays for the equipment.

Strawberry soon arrives at the venue to see her friends, who greet her with "Happy Birthday" and give her a present: the Pieman's watering can. The device fails to grow everything and spills over instead, flooding the Park and much of Strawberryland. The children are dismayed that the Pieman tricked them for his berry-stealing plot, and soon they harvest every bit of that supply over to him.

The group travels to the Pie Tin Palace on rafts made of flotsam. Landing upon a mud field, they find out from Lucky Bug that Apple Dumplin' ended up at the Palace, and realize they now have no way to rescue her. Mr. Sun, the narrator of the story, grants Strawberry a wish. She wishes to defeat the Pieman, and a grove of marching trees help her accomplish this, their stomping destroys the palace. Afterward, Apple Dumplin' gives him a note demanding that he surrender and do good deeds; he reluctantly does so, giving the toddler and berries back to Strawberry and her friends. At the end of the special, Strawberry Shortcake offers him a chance to sell his pies at Strawberry Market, and they become friends.

== Cast ==
Name	Character	Source
Russi Taylor	Strawberry Shortcake	
Robert Ridgely	Peculiar Purple Pieman	
Romeo Muller	Mr. Sun / Narrator	
Julie McWhirter	Huckleberry Pie	
Joan Gerber	Blueberry Muffin / Apple Dumplin'	
Pamela Anderson	Raspberry Tart	
Bob Holt	Escargot	

== Production ==
Produced and sponsored by the Kenner toy company, The World of Strawberry Shortcake was the first of six television specials to star the title character. The franchise began in 1977, when American Greetings staff member Muriel Fahrion drew the first designs of Strawberry and her pet cat Custard. In 1979, she appeared in greeting cards; dolls, books and games soon followed.

The special was made by Murakami-Wolf-Swenson, which previously worked on The Point! and Frank Zappa's 200 Motels, both from 1971. RLR Associates of New York City was another production partner. Animation work was also handled by Japan's Toei Animation. At the time of production, the producers called it a "morality play for tots". One of the crewmembers was Romeo Muller, writer for several Rankin/Bass television specials. Muller served as writer, co-producer and lyricist of the Strawberry Shortcake special; he also voiced Mr. Sun, the narrator. After he proposed the idea to Kenner, the company and American Greetings agreed to do it. According to Jack Chojnacki, co-president of Those Characters from Cleveland, a subsidiary of American Greetings, the card manufacturer considered new additions to the script, and reminded the writer that every character should be marketable. With those suggestions in mind, Muller came up with a villain called the Peculiar Purple Pieman. The Toy Group division of General Mills, which owned Kenner at the time, spent US$400,000 on the special. For the music, director Charles Swenson invited the duo Flo & Eddie, who were also involved with 200 Motels and who had an office near the Murakami-Wolf-Swenson headquarters. They wrote three songs in a day, which were approved by both Swenson and Muller, and went on to score the whole special. Mark Volman stated that he and Howard Kaylan aimed "to do something different with children's records", which "weren't really a respected medium and companies weren't used to paying people for producing something slick for kids", with songs that could stand on their own and be liked by fans of the duo's old group, The Turtles, while also providing positive messages for children. The tracks were recorded by Flo & Eddie at Sun Swept Studios, with the only outside musician being the facility's owner, John Hoier.

== Release ==
The first Strawberry Shortcake television special, which aired in 1980, revived a potent controversy that many people believed had been laid to rest. [The World of Strawberry Shortcake] was clearly as much a program-length commercial as the old Hot Wheels cartoon show had been. But the regulatory mood in Washington had changed, and the Strawberry Shortcake special opened the way for what sometimes appears to be the transformation of children's television into a promotional arm of the toy industry.

— David Owen, "The Man Who Invented Saturday Morning" (essay), 1986

Upon completion, Muller was satisfied with how The World of Strawberry Shortcake turned out. Although he pointed out the lack of such influences in the special, he told The New York Times in April 1981 that he supposed the show to be a commercial. Some time after the title character's debut at the 1980 American International Toy Fair, major television networks in the U.S. were offered a chance to air the special. They also deemed it an advertisement for the toy line, and rejected it. On March 28, 1980, the special debuted on independent stations in over 90 U.S. cities; (Note: Woolery (1989) gives a figure of "more than 95 markets".) it aired on WNEW (now WNYW) in the New York City market, and on KTLA in Los Angeles. Kenner launched a collection of dolls and toys based on the special, concurrently with the original broadcast. This led John J. O'Connor of The New York Times to proclaim, "Onward and upward with the art of marketing!"

In 1981, the Lexington Broadcast Services Company acquired syndication rights to The World of Strawberry Shortcake, along with its follow-up, Strawberry Shortcake in Big Apple City. By 1986, the Television Program Source took over the rights for the first special. It was released on 16 mm film by the Coronet company in 1982, and on VHS and Beta in October 1985 by Family Home Entertainment. A Region 1 DVD from Illumination FilmWorks, featuring this special and Big Apple City, was released on March 6, 2007. In Germany, the original special premiered on ZDF on April 4, 1983, as Emily im Erdbeerland. A record album containing the complete special was released by Kid Stuff Records the same year as the original airing. The track list featured the "Strawberry Shortcake Theme", along with "Smile a Sunny Morning", "Sunflower Market", "Monster Trees" and "Berry Talk".

== Reception ==
The World of Strawberry Shortcake was positively reviewed twice by the School Library Journal. In a December 1983 issue, Margaret Bush said that the "story, characters, dialogue and bits of stage business are busy, bright, contrived, and will appeal of young children", but also added that "some of the lyrics and dialogue are not easily understood – it sounds as if adult voices may be attempting to simulate the voices of small children". In the August 2007 issue, Kirsten Martindale wrote that "fans [...] will be completely captivated by these two episodes", recommending it for nostalgic moms and their daughters, but also said that it might be boring for older audiences.

In 1987, Kathleen Pulcini of The Video Directory called it "delightful fun for children".

== Notes ==
Preceded by N/A	1980's Strawberry Shortcake specials 1980	Succeeded by Strawberry Shortcake in Big Apple City
