= Noël (TV special) =

- Genre: Christmas special
- Written by: Romeo Muller
- Directed by: Masaki Îzuka
- Narrated by: Charlton Heston
- Countries of origin: United States; Japan
- Original language: English

Production
- Executive producer: Bert Stratford
- Producer: Masaki Îzuka
- Running time: 25 minutes
- Production company: Muller-Stratford Productions

Original release
- Network: NBC
- Release: December 4, 1992

Noël is a 1992 American Christmas television special. The special first aired on NBC on December 4, 1992.

== Plot ==
In the early 20th century, an elderly glassblower named Herman is making Christmas ornaments when he is given news that his daughter has given birth to a baby girl. Overcome with joy at being a grandfather, one of Herman's tears end up in the Christmas bulb he is making. Upon being completed, the ornament comes to life and introduces himself by saying “My name is Noel, and I have a happiness!” because Herman's tear became Noel's happiness. The optimistic and curious Noel meets an ice maiden shaped ornament named Miss Freezenda who is irked by Noel's continuously upbeat demeanor. Both Noel and Miss Freezenda are placed in a box (referred to by the ornaments as “the box thing”) with ten other ornaments of varied shapes all of whom are as irked by Noel's optimism as Miss Freezenda. The box of ornaments is delivered to a five and ten store where they are put on display and Noel sees and is intrigued by humans, whom Mss Freezenda reluctantly tells Noel are “people things” and “children things”.

Eventually, the ornaments are bought by a mother and are taken to a home much to Noel's delight as he sees and learns more about the world. Noel is introduced to and becomes friends with Brutus, the family's Evergreen Christmas tree who gladly answers Noel's questions. On Christmas Eve, Noel and the other ornaments are placed on Brutus' limbs where Noel befriends the Christmas lights, the tinsel, and the toy train McIves who circles the tree but is occupied with, as Burtus puts it, trying to catch his tail. A little manager is also placed beneath the tree which Brutus tells Noel is what Christmas is all about. After the parents finish setting up the tree, Noel describes how he feels to Brutus who tells Noel that what he is feeling is peace and goodwill and that it is a rare feeling beyond people, animals, and some trees with Noel attributing it to his happiness. Noel experiences the jovial celebrations between Christmas and New Year's.

However, when it becomes January 2, Noel is distraught at the realization that with the end of the holidays he will go back in his box and Brutus will be thrown out. As Brutus says goodbye he tells Noel to keep that happiness of his. The ornaments are placed in the attic there they are forgotten until the passage of time sees Winter return and over a number of years Noel befriends several other trees whom he befriends but also sorrowfully departs throughout the years. Over the successive Christmases, Noel notices the “children things” getting bigger and looking more like “people things” and sees them graduate, get married, and enlisted in Military service. After several years with their children scattered over the country with families of their own the mother and father choose not to bother with a tree leading Noel to fall into an endless sleep missing the mother and father passing away.

After the house and ornaments lay abandoned for several years, a new family moves into and renovates the old house. During Christmas, the mother of the new family finds the ornaments in the attic and intends to place them on the tree. Noel is excited by the prospect of brand new “children things” and returning to the Christmas tree, but the father sees the ornaments are too chipped and old to use but the mother takes Noel while allowing the others to be discarded. In his exuberance at seeing McIves again, Noel's excitement over strains his fragile and aged hook and he falls from the tree and shatters outside the miniature Nativity Scene. Despite being shattered, Noel remains aware and through a miracle he becomes a spirit of pure happiness and is able to move freely beyond the old house to see more of Christmas than before. Noel travels throughout the world and learns of new people including some who didn't celebrate Christmas to which Noel reacts unconcerned as he is content to share happiness with any and all who can enjoy it.

== Cast ==
- Charlton Heston - Narrator
- Larissa Auble - Child
- Roscoe Lee Browne - Brutus
- John Crenshaw - Child
- Earl Hammond
- Lee Meredith
- Romeo Muller
- Peter Newman
- Beau Berdahl - Noel
- Corinne Orr - Miss Freezenda
- Millicent Sparks
- Ed Wheeler

== Production ==
Noël is based on a story Romeo Muller had written in the 1950s as a present for a friend. Muller engaged in annual readings of the story for family and friends, visits to local schools, and in 1986 recorded a reading of the story for his hometown radio station WGHQ which would continue to air the reading annually including after his death in 1992. According to Muller, the story didn't have any specific origin and was just the basic idea of a Christmas bulb experiencing the family Christmas. Despite his annual readings of the story, Muller was hesitant to adapt the story as a Christmas television special because he had a personal connection to the story and was worried if he brought his idea to the television networks they would ask for changes due to the story dealing with some sensitive subjects. After years in semi-retirement, Muller formed a new production company in 1991 with partner Bert Stratford who suggested they adapt Noël as a special on the condition they would not entertain any mandated changes by the networks as Stratford knew how important the story was to Muller. The special had been pitched to ABC but when the network wanted to shift the focus from the ornament to "an advertiser-friendly, demographically desirable family", negotiations were ended and the special was instead set up at NBC who liked the special the way it was and aired it without any executive notes or changes. Muller expressed skepticism that Noël would attain the level of success of Rudolph the Red-Nosed Reindeer as while Rudolph was, as he described it "Christmas all the way through", Muller described Noël as being a far more Spiritual. While Muller described himself as "religious", he rejected a dogmatic approach to personal beliefs instead focusing onto trying to find a feeling of goodness and a belief in good overcoming evil.

== Broadcast ==
The special first aired on NBC on December 4, 1992.

== Merchandise ==
In January 1993, Little Golden Books published a 24 page adaptation of Noël with illustrations by Bill A. Langley and written by Muller. Noël was given a home video release by PolyGram Video.

== Reception ==
In a retrospective review for America Magazine, Jim McDermott criticized the animation as bland and the tone as overly harsh for Christmas, but did complement the special on its message that happiness is within us, and it can sustain us and cheer our world.

== Legacy ==
Noël would mark the final work by Romeo Muller to see release prior to his death from heart attack following a diagnosis of pancreatic cancer. Prior to his death, Muller and his producing partner Bert Stratford were working on another Christmas television special to be titled The Twelve Days of Christmas, but as Muller had only completed a rough outline prior to his death Muller would receive a "story by" credit while the writing was finished by Glenn Leopold.

== See also ==
- List of Christmas films
- List of Rankin/Bass Productions films
