= Robert Ridgely =

American actor (1931–1997)

- Born: December 24, 1931; Teaneck, New Jersey, U.S.
- Died: February 8, 1997 (aged 65); Los Angeles, California, U.S.
- Occupation: Actor
- Years active: 1960–1997

Robert Ridgely (December 24, 1931 – February 8, 1997) was an American actor, known for both on-camera roles and extensive voice-over work.

== Early life ==
Ridgely was born in Teaneck, New Jersey. Before becoming an actor, he worked as a cabaret entertainer.

== Career ==
He served as a talk show host with Woody Woodbury. Ridgely appeared in commercials, including a classic McDonald's commercial, staged as a Broadway production number, where he sings "there is nothin' so clean – as my burger machine". He guest starred in TV series such as Sea Hunt and the Warner Bros. Television series Maverick, Lawman, and Surfside 6. He landed a regular role as Lieutenant Kimbro in the short-lived World War II series The Gallant Men. After the series was cancelled, he made guest appearances in shows, including Bonanza, WKRP in Cincinnati, Coach, Night Court, Wings, and Designing Women.

He appeared in various films, including two productions directed by Robert Altman early in his career, Nightmare in Chicago and Countdown. He also appeared in several Mel Brooks productions, including Blazing Saddles (1974), High Anxiety (1977), Life Stinks (1991) and Robin Hood: Men in Tights (1993). Ridgley starred in other films, including Something Wild (1986), Beverly Hills Cop II (1987), Philadelphia (1993), and Boogie Nights (1997). He put his strong voice to use in voice-over roles in films like Down and Dirty Duck (1974) and television specials such as Thanksgiving in the Land of Oz (aka Dorothy in the Land of Oz) (1980). He did a great deal of voice work in animated series as well, including the titular heroes in Tarzan, Lord of the Jungle, The New Adventures of Flash Gordon, and Thundarr the Barbarian. From 1985 to 1996, Ridgely was one of ABC's main primetime promo announcers. He also voiced the Peculiar Purple Pieman in the 1980s Strawberry Shortcake specials, Rex Charger in The Centurions, Thunderbolt Ross in The Incredible Hulk (1982), Finch in Daisy-Head Mayzie, and Commander Chief in Dexter's Laboratory.

== Death ==
Ridgely died of cancer on February 8, 1997, at his home in the Toluca Lake neighborhood of Los Angeles.

== Filmography ==
=== Film ===
Year	Title	Role	Notes
1964	Nightmare in Chicago	Dan McVeay	
1971	Chrome and Hot Leather	Sergeant Mack	
1974	Blazing Saddles	Boris, the hangman	
1974	The Nine Lives of Fritz the Cat	The Devil (voice)	
1974	Down and Dirty Duck	Car Salesman (voice)	
1977	High Anxiety	Flasher	
1977	Prime Time a.k.a. American Raspberry	Celebrity Sportsman Host	
1977	The Mouse and His Child	Jack-in-the-Box (voice)	
1980	Melvin and Howard	Wally 'Mr. Love' Williams	
1983	Heart Like a Wheel	Bob Morton, 'Sportsline'	
1984	The Wild Life	Craig Davis	
1986	Something Wild	Richard Graves	
1987	Beverly Hills Cop II	Mayor Ted Egan	
1988	The Dirk Diggler Story	Jack Horner	Short film
1993	Philadelphia	Walter Kenton	
1993	Robin Hood: Men in Tights	Hangman	
1994	The Ref	Bob Burley	
1996	Hard Eight	Keno Bar Manager	
1996	Multiplicity	Laura's Father	
1996	That Thing You Do!	Hollywood Showcase Announcer	
1997	Fire Down Below	Simon	Posthumous release
1997	Boogie Nights	Colonel James	Posthumous release; final film role

=== Television ===
Year	Title	Role	Notes
1974	Hong Kong Phooey	Additional voices	Recurring role
1975	Uncle Croc's Block	Steve Exhaustion, Captain Klangeroo (live-action segments), Bullseye, Hilda, Sonar, Tricky John Trooper (voices: "M.U.S.H." segment)	Main role
1976-1979	Tarzan, Lord of the Jungle	Tarzan (voice)	Main role
1978	Puff the Magic Dragon	Pirate, Pieman, Sneeze (voice)	Television special
1979–1982	The New Adventures of Flash Gordon	Flash Gordon (voice)	Main role
1980	The World of Strawberry Shortcake	Peculiar Purple Pieman (voice)	Television special
1980	Thanksgiving in the Land of Oz	Jack Pumpkinhead, Tyron (voice)	Television special
1980	The Fonz and the Happy Days Gang	Additional voices	Recurring role
1980–1981	Thundarr the Barbarian	Thundarr (voice)	Main role
1981	Strawberry Shortcake in Big Apple City	Peculiar Purple Pieman (voice)	Television special
1981	The Smurfs	Additional voices	Recurring role
1982	Strawberry Shortcake: Pets on Parade	Peculiar Purple Pieman (voice)	Television special
1982	Richie Rich	Collector (voice)	3 episodes
1982–1983	The Incredible Hulk	Thunderbolt Ross (voice)	Main role
1983	Strawberry Shortcake: Housewarming Surprise	Peculiar Purple Pieman (voice)	Television special
1983	Alvin and the Chipmunks	Additional voices	Recurring role
1983	Monchhichis	Additional voices	Recurring role
1983	Saturday Supercade	Pitfall Harry (voice, "Pitfall!" segment)	Main role
1984	Strawberry Shortcake and the Baby Without a Name	Peculiar Purple Pieman (voice)	Television special
1984–1985	Lucky Luke	Jolly Jumper (voice: English dub)	Main role
1984	Snorks	Mr. Kelp	Recurring role
1985	Strawberry Shortcake Meets the Berrykins	Peculiar Purple Pieman (voice)	Television special
1985	The 13 Ghosts of Scooby-Doo	Captain Ferguson / Time Slime (voice)	2 episodes
1985	Galtar and the Golden Lance	Additional voices	Recurring role
1985	The Jetsons	Additional voices	Recurring role
1985	Paw Paws	Mighty Paw (voice)	Main role
1987	DuckTales	RipCord McQuack (voice)	Episode: "Top Duck"
1989	Denver, the Last Dinosaur	Douggie (voice)	Episode: "Party Time"
1989	The Karate Kid	Additional voices	Recurring role
1990	TaleSpin	C.V. (voice)	Episode: "A Star Is Torn"
1990	The Adventures of Don Coyote and Sancho Panda	Additional Voices	Recurring role
1990	Bill & Ted's Excellent Adventures	Additional voices	Recurring role
1990	Gravedale High	Colonel Saddlesore (voice)	Episode: "Frankenjockey"
1991	Teenage Mutant Ninja Turtles	Groundchuck (voice)	3 episodes
1992	Tom & Jerry Kids	Sheriff Potgut (voice)	2 episodes
1992	Capitol Critters	Additional Voices	2 episodes
1992	Fish Police	Bob Sharks (voice)	Episode: "Beauty's Only Fin Deep"
1992	Goof Troop	Great Garbonzo (voice)	Episode: "Talent to the Max"
1992	Batman: The Animated Series	Madman (voice)	Episode: "Appointment in Crime Alley"
1993	SWAT Kats: The Radical Squadron	Dr. Harley Street (voice)	Episode: "The Ci-Kat-A"
1993	Bonkers	Al Vermin / Z-Bot (voice)	6 episodes
1994	Fantastic Four	Skrull Emperor, Additional voices	2 episodes
1995	Daisy-Head Mayzie	Finch (voice)	Television film
1995	Dumb and Dumber	Various voices	2 episodes
1996	Dexter's Laboratory	Commander General, Various voices	4 episodes
1996	Quack Pack	Captain Jack (voice)	Episode: "Ready, Aim...Duck!"
1997	Cow and Chicken	Dr. Chunks (voice)	Episode: "Part Time Job"; posthumous release

Preceded by Ron Ely	Actors to portray Tarzan; 1976-1981	Succeeded by Miles O'Keeffe
