= Romeo Muller =

American dramatist (1928–92)

- Born: Romeo Earl Muller, Jr. August 7, 1928; Bronx, New York, U.S.
- Died: December 30, 1992 (aged 64); High Falls, New York, U.S.
- Occupations: Screenwriter, actor

Romeo Earl Muller, Jr. (August 7, 1928 – December 30, 1992) was an American screenwriter and actor most remembered for his screenplays for the Rankin/Bass Christmas specials including Rudolph the Red-Nosed Reindeer, The Little Drummer Boy, Frosty the Snowman, and Santa Claus Is Coming to Town.

== Early years ==
Muller was born in the Bronx, New York, the son of Mildred (Kuhlmann) and Romeo Earl Muller Sr. He was raised on Long Island. His talents in the arts were evident very early on. At age 11, he became a puppeteer at his grade school and eventually he began writing his own plays.

His career in theatre began when he joined an acting troupe called "Theater Go Round" in Virginia Beach, Virginia with producer/friend Lesley Savage. At this time Romeo wrote plays such as Angel With The Big, Big Ears and The Great Getaway, which eventually became the Rankin-Bass off Broadway play A Month Of Sundays. Since Muller was a big man at 6'2", 300 pounds (1.88 m, 136 kg), he decided to stay away from acting and turn his attention towards writing.

== Career ==
After writing material for comedian Jack Benny, Muller was discovered by CBS founder William S. Paley and selected to be a staff writer for the prestigious Studio One and Philco Theatre. He wrote one of the most popular episodes for the Studio One series entitled "Love Me To Pieces, Baby".

In 1963, Muller met with producer/directors Arthur Rankin, Jr. and Jules Bass and began a relationship that would last for years. Rankin and Bass asked Romeo to write a screenplay for their first Network television special, entitled Return to Oz, which aired on NBC's the General Electric Fantasy Hour. The special was a success and set the stage for the most popular holiday television special of all time, Rudolph the Red-Nosed Reindeer. Muller embellished the short story into an hour-long broadcast and added a variety of characters into the story. He is also known for his screenplays in other such films as Santa Claus Is Comin' to Town, The Little Drummer Boy, Here Comes Peter Cottontail, and Frosty the Snowman, among many others.

In 1965, several Theatre-Five radio productions featured Muller as writer and/or actor.

He was also the voice of the narrator, a talking sun, in the first three Strawberry Shortcake TV specials from the 1980s, which he also wrote and co-produced.

Muller read his favorite and first Christmas story every year on Christmas Eve on New York radio station WGHQ. The story was reworked as the basis for the animated special Noël which aired on NBC on Friday December 4, 1992, 26 days before Muller died.

In 2002, the book Jill Chill and the Baron of Glacier Mountain by Ed McCray featured a character named Romeo after Muller. The book is written in the style of the old Christmas specials that Muller had written.

== Death ==
Muller died of a heart attack in his sleep on Wednesday, 30 December 1992, shortly after receiving a diagnosis of cancer.

== Work ==
=== Plays ===
- Angel With the Big, Big Ears
- A Month of Sundays
- Superman
- The Great Git-Away

=== Filmography ===
Holiday TV specials

- Rudolph the Red-Nosed Reindeer (1964)
- Cricket on the Hearth (1967)
- The Mouse on the Mayflower (1968)
- The Little Drummer Boy (1968)
- Frosty the Snowman (1969)
- Santa Claus is Comin' to Town (1970)
- Here Comes Peter Cottontail (1971)
- Rudolph's Shiny New Year (1975, 1976)
- Frosty's Winter Wonderland (1976)
- The Easter Bunny Is Comin' to Town (1977)
- Nestor, the Long–Eared Christmas Donkey (1977)
- The Stingiest Man in Town (1978)
- The Little Rascals Christmas Special (1979)
- Jack Frost (1979)
- Rudolph and Frosty's Christmas in July (1979)
- Thanksgiving in the Land of Oz (aka Dorothy in the Land of Oz) (1980)
- Pinocchio's Christmas (1980)
- The Leprechauns' Christmas Gold (1981)
- Peter and the Magic Egg (1983)
- Father Christmas (1991)
- Noël (1992)
- The Twelve Days of Christmas (1993)
- The Legend of Frosty the Snowman (2005) (Posthumous writing credit)

Other TV specials

- Return to Oz (1964)
- The Mad, Mad, Mad Comedians (1970)
- The Enchanted World of Danny Kaye: The Emperor's New Clothes (1972)
- Willie Mays and the Say-Hey Kid (1972)
- The Hobbit (1977)
- It's a Brand New World (1977)
- Puff the Magic Dragon (1978)
- Puff the Magic Dragon in the Land of Living Lies (1979)
- The Return of the King (1980)
- The World of Strawberry Shortcake (1980)
- Strawberry Shortcake in Big Apple City (1981)
- Puff and the Incredible Mr. Nobody (1982)
- Strawberry Shortcake: Pets on Parade (1982)
- The Flight of Dragons (1982)
- The Wind in the Willows (1987)
- Peppermint Rose (1993)

TV series

- The Smokey Bear Show (1969–70)
- The Reluctant Dragon and Mr. Toad Show (1970–71)
- The Tomfoolery Show (1970–71)
- The Jackson 5ive (1971–73)
- The Osmonds (1972–74)
- The Comic Strip (1987) (The Mini-Monsters segments)
- ThunderCats ("The Mask of Gorgon") (1987)
- The Kids from C.A.P.E.R. (1976–77)

Feature films

- The Daydreamer (1966)
- The Wacky World of Mother Goose (1967)
- Marco (1973)
