= Strawberry Shortcake =

Media franchise

- An original Strawberry Shortcake poster featuring the titular character
- First appearance: Greeting cards published by American Greetings (1977)
- Created by: Barbi Sargent (creator); Muriel Fahrion (designer of supporting characters); Frances Kariotakis (finished art)
- Voiced by: Russi Taylor (all six 1980s animated specials); Sarah Heinke (2003 series and The Sweet Dreams Movie); Anna Cummer (Strawberry Shortcake's Berry Bitty Adventures and Sky's the Limit); Tracey Moore (Strawberry Shortcake's Berry Bitty Adventures, singing voice); Alyson Leigh Rosenfeld (WildBrain Spark series); Ana Sani (Strawberry Shortcake: Berry in the Big City); Vanessa Marroquin (2026 relaunch, The Berry Best Baking Show); Kristi Boulton (2026 relaunch, Strawberry Shortcake's Bake Shop)

In-universe information
- Full name: Strawberry Shortcake
- Gender: Female
- Relatives: Apple Dumplin' (sister/cousin); Custard (cat); Pupcake (dog); Aunt Praline (aunt); Grandberry Jam (grandmother); Strawberry Cobbler (mother); Pineapple Cobbler (brother)
- Origin: The World of Strawberry Shortcake

Strawberry Shortcake is a media franchise that originated from a series of greeting cards published by American Greetings bearing the image of the titular character. The line was later expanded to include dolls, clothing, posters, and other products featuring the character, as well as an extended cast of friends and pets. In addition, the franchise has spawned television specials, animated television series and films. The franchise is currently owned by the Canadian children's television company WildBrain through the holding company Shortcake IP Holdings LLC.

== History ==
=== Conception and creation ===
The character of Strawberry Shortcake was originally created by Barbi Sargent, who was then working as a freelance artist for American Greetings. The character first appeared on a Laurel Valentine's Day greeting card in 1972–1973. At the time, the character was simply called Girl with a Daisy or Strawberry Girl and was depicted holding a daisy while wearing an orange bonnet with a strawberry print on it. Rex Conners, American Greetings' staff art director, knew this card was very popular and determined that this was due to the strawberry motif. He requested Sargent to create four cards with a "strawberryish" outfit for the Mega Test Market. Sargent completed the assignment in early July 1977, sending American Greetings four full-color leader cards depicting the Strawberry Shortcake character in full color ("Leader cards" are used by American Greetings for consumer test purposes). These tests marked the first time that the public saw Strawberry Shortcake in her new design, which received a positive reception.

In the late 1970s, further Strawberry Shortcake concept art was drawn by Muriel Fahrion, an illustrator working in American Greetings' Juvenile & Humorous card department. Fahrion then designed a subsequent 32 characters for Those Characters From Cleveland (American Greetings' toy and licensing design division). Later characters that were added to the line were designed by Cindy Mayer Patton and Janet Jones. Artwork for the series was done by a number of different freelancers, though the majority was painted by artist Frances Kariotakis. Lynn Edwards served as the editor of the line, helping to develop the characters and storyline.

The Strawberry Shortcake line of characters each had their own fruit with clothing to match, and they each had a fruit or dessert-named pet. Like the Strawberry Shortcake doll, all the other characters' dolls had hair scented to match their theme. The characters lived and played in a magical world known as Strawberryland.

=== Merchandise ===
In 1979, toy manufacturer Kenner licensed the character and released the first Strawberry Shortcake doll. At the time, Strawberry Shortcake resembled a typical rag doll, complete with freckles, a mop of red yarn curls, and dressed in a red dress with a white apron, green and white striped socks and a pink bonnet with strawberry print. To reflect this, the first toy was constructed to be a rag doll, designed by Muriel Fahrion and made by Susan Trentel, Fahrion's sister.

In May 1984, following the ruling in Sargent v. American Greetings Corp., copyrights to Strawberry Shortcake were granted to Barbi Sargent. Later on, Sargent returned the copyrights to American Greetings so that they could continue with the success of the Strawberry Shortcake franchise.

During the 1980s, Strawberry Shortcake became popular with children throughout the United States. At the time, there were many related products, such as children's books, sticker albums, clothing, bedding, a video game by Parker Brothers entitled Strawberry Shortcake: Musical Match-ups for the Atari 2600, and Bike's Big Wheels.

The Strawberry Shortcake Bicycle was introduced in 1983 and production ended in 1990. Over the bike's seven-year model run, it is estimated that over 1 million of the Strawberry Shortcake Bicycles were sold, making the bike one of the most popular licensed character themed bikes ever produced. Several TV specials were made featuring the characters, one each year between 1980 and 1985, by which time the characters' popularity had diminished. Kenner produced no new dolls or toys thereafter.

American Greetings manufactured Strawberry Shortcake Christmas ornaments, which are included in the Clara Johnson Scroggins collection, one of the world's largest ornament collections.

=== Television specials ===
The first animated television special featuring Strawberry Shortcake and related characters, The World of Strawberry Shortcake, aired on syndicated television stations in the United States on March 28, 1980. After the success of the special, a second special was produced, Strawberry Shortcake in Big Apple City which aired on April 10, 1981, of which both were syndicated through the Lexington Broadcast Services Company. A third special Strawberry Shortcake: Pets on Parade was later produced, and aired on April 9, 1982. The specials were written and produced by Robert L. Rosen and Romeo Muller, with animation provided by Murakami-Wolf-Swenson and Toei Doga, while the second was animated by Perpetual Motion Pictures in New York. Howard Kaylan and Mark Volman, of The Turtles and Flo & Eddie fame, wrote the music and songs for these specials. Russi Taylor voiced Strawberry Shortcake, Robert Ridgely voiced Purple Pie Man, and writer/producer Romeo Muller voiced the narrator, Mr. Sun.

Following these specials came three additional specials produced in Canada by Nelvana - Strawberry Shortcake: Housewarming Surprise, which aired on March 31, 1983, Strawberry Shortcake and the Baby Without a Name on March 24, 1984 and Strawberry Shortcake Meets the Berrykins on March 29, 1985. (Note: Theatrically released in the U.S. with The Care Bears Movie.) With production moving north of the border, most of the voice cast was replaced with Canadian talent, with the exception of Russi Taylor and Robert Ridgely, who reprised their roles from the first three specials. Frequent Nelvana collaborator John Sebastian, most known for his songs for Nelvana's Care Bears films and the pilot episode of The Get Along Gang, wrote the songs for two of these three specials.

The first two specials were released on a single DVD by Allumination FilmWorks in March 2007; they were later re-released in 2015, by Paramount Home Media Distribution. The remaining four specials have not seen another physical media release since their VHS releases in the 1980s; plans have not been announced for a release of the remaining specials on physical media or streaming.

=== 1991 relaunch ===
In 1991, THQ relaunched the franchise by producing an updated line of Strawberry Shortcake dolls. Strawberry and five of her classic friends each got a makeover with new clothes, hair, and eyes, but the line saw only modest success and was very short-lived, lasting only a year. American Greetings' VP of licensing, Michael Brown, said in 2002 that the THQ relaunch failed due to being around at the wrong time, with the audience who enjoyed the franchise in the 1980s only being in their teenage years at the time.

=== 2003 relaunch ===
In 2001, American Greetings appointed DIC Entertainment as the exclusive licensing agent for the franchise. DIC and American Greetings officially revealed their plans in March 2002 to relaunch the franchise for a new generation with a series of four specials released direct-to-video through 20th Century Fox Home Entertainment beginning in 2003 and later air on television, alongside various merchandise deals including a major toy licensing deal with Bandai. Merchandising would initially focus on the classic designs, which would be released in the second half of 2002, while merchandise featuring the new look would be released in 2003 to coincide with the specials.

The relaunch focused on a main core cast of characters - Strawberry Shortcake, Custard the cat, Pupcake the dog, Angel Cake, Orange Blossom, Huckleberry Pie, Apple Dumplin' and new character Ginger Snap. The existing characters were redesigned to look more like actual children than dolls. Custard and Pupcake also had major redesigns to look more like actual animals than stuffed toys, of which Pupcake now belongs to Strawberry Shortcake. Apple Dumplin' would also become Strawberry Shortcake's sister. Additionally, Strawberryland was divided into "districts", such as Cakewalk, Orange Blossom Acres, Huckleberry Briar and Cookie Corners. The relaunch also introduced fillies to the series, with Honey Pie Pony being the main filly, and the only one who could talk and have a pet of her own.

For the second year of the relaunch, the characters each gained their own fillies and pets, and several additional characters were added.

An Argentine live-action TV series based on the franchise was shown on El Nueve in 2005, with Laura Anders as Strawberry Shortcake, Camila Offermann as Angel Cake, Luz Luccarini as Ginger Snap and Alan Ferraro as Huckleberry Pie, and was produced and directed by Paula Venditti and Jonathan Hofman, with 36 episodes.

Starting in January 2006, Playmates Toys became the franchise's master toy partner along with DIC Entertainment. Alongside that, a line of merchandise for infants and toddlers was also introduced. Playmates' toy range was entitled "A World of Friends" and introduced several "international" characters to the recurring cast who would also appear in the series. Playmates also introduced new fillies, but the removal has not spread beyond the scope of the toy line.

To coincide with the franchise's 25th anniversary, DIC planned to produce three additional direct-to-video specials for release in 2006. DIC produced a feature-length computer-animated film based on the franchise, titled Strawberry Shortcake: The Sweet Dreams Movie, which was released in select cities by Kidtoon Films in October 2006. The series villains, the Purple Pieman and Sour Grapes, who were notably absent from the 2003 TV series, are reintroduced in the film, but Sour Grapes is reintroduced as the Purple Pieman's sister in materials related to the Sweet Dreams Movie. It was released on DVD in February 2007, and has also aired on networks and released on DVD and VCD worldwide.

=== 2009 relaunch ===
In 2008, Hasbro acquired the rights to produce a new line of Strawberry Shortcake toys. The extensive relaunch involved numerous large redesigns and a reboot of the franchise's universe.

The relaunch began in the Summer of 2009, with the release of a CGI film, The Strawberry Shortcake Movie: Sky's the Limit, with Anna Cummer voicing Strawberry Shortcake. A TV series, Strawberry Shortcake's Berry Bitty Adventures, debuted in October 2010 on The Hub.

The characters of the show are reduced to an initial lineup of six main characters: Strawberry Shortcake, Lemon Meringue, Orange Blossom, Raspberry Torte, Plum Pudding, and Blueberry Muffin. Cherry Jam, a new character made for the series, is introduced in the second season. Huckleberry Pie was reintroduced in the third season as a recurring character, while Sweet and Sour Grapes (no relation to the villainess character) debuted in Series 4, alongside the return of Apple Dumplin'.

In 2014, The Bridge Direct became the new master toy partner for the franchise. The products shown appeared to retain the designs of the 2009 Strawberry Shortcake relaunch and included several dolls, pets, doll furniture, and musical instruments.

In 2015, Iconix Brand Group acquired the rights to Strawberry Shortcake from American Greetings for $105 million.

In 2016, IDW Publishing released an ongoing Strawberry Shortcake comic series written by Georgia Ball and illustrated by Amy Mebberson. Both Ball and Mebberson identified as fans of the 1980s series, with Ball drawing inspiration from girls with "doubts and challenges but their friends back them up and support them".

In 2018, DHX Media and its subsidiary, WildBrain, debuted a new 2D animated series of Strawberry Shortcake on YouTube and YouTube TV, produced by WildBrain London. The series features the return of the Purple Pieman and Raisin Cane to the series. The cast for the series features Alyson Leigh Rosenfeld as Strawberry Shortcake, Amanda Barker as Orange Blossom, Dylan Jones as the Purple Pieman, Kaylin Lee Clinton as Raisin Cane, and Laurie Hymes as Sour Grapes.

=== Cancelled 2018 relaunch ===
In 2016, Iconix Brand Group and DHX Media (now WildBrain) began to develop a new Strawberry Shortcake animated series. The series was scheduled to run for three seasons, totaling 39 episodes, although no cast, crew, or release date were revealed at the time, and would have used 3D computer animation similar to the 2009 series. The only known elements of this show was Strawberry possessing a magical power, and there were berrykins.

In 2017, DHX Media acquired Iconix's entertainment brands, including Strawberry Shortcake, for $345 million, allowing DHX to fully take over production of the planned revival. This deal was finalized at the end of June. This respective reboot was soon revealed to have been an early concept of the current series: Berry in the Big City.

=== 2021 relaunch ===
Logo from 2021–2024

A new relaunch of the franchise began in 2021 with 2D-animated web series from WildBrain Studios, titled Strawberry Shortcake: Berry in the Big City, which aired on YouTube and later on Family Jr..

The central cast of this adaptation features Strawberry Shortcake, Custard, Orange Blossom, Lemon Meringue, Blueberry Muffin, and returning character Lime Chiffon. Raspberry Torte, who is renamed back to Raspberry Tart, is featured as Strawberry's arch-rival and is accompanied by Sour Grapes and new character Bread Pudding as the three antagonists of Season 1, with the Purple Pieman as the antagonist of Season 2.

A series of four holiday-themed CGI specials were also produced and premiered in Canada on Family Jr. in 2023 and 2024, and premiered globally on Netflix since October 2023. WildBrain pre-sold the four specials internationally to a selection of broadcasters, while NCircle Entertainment handles home media distribution of the series and the specials in the United States.

In 2024, WildBrain announced the production of The Care Berry Switch, a forty-four minute special that crosses over with Cloudco Entertainment's Care Bears franchise.

=== 2026 relaunch ===
Another relaunch of the property, this time utilizing the original 1980s appearance of the character, began in 2026. This relaunch focuses on material produced for digital media platforms like YouTube, TikTok and Instagram.

== List of characters ==
=== Introduced in the 1980s ===
- Strawberry Shortcake: The titular protagonist, she is a sweet and friendly baker who always seeks to make new friends and have fun adventures.
  - Custard, Strawberry's pet cat (1980s, 2003, 2009, 2021)
  - Pupcake, a recurring pet dog. He has been Huckleberry Pie's pet (1980s), Strawberry Shortcake's pet (2003, 2009), and Orange Blossom's pet (2021).
  - Honey Pie Pony, Strawberry's very talkative filly friend (2003)
- Huckleberry Pie: A major recurring male character and occasional love interest of Strawberry, he has been a fisherman (1980s), a skateboarder (2003), a dog caretaker (2009) and a musician (2021).
  - Shoofly, Huckleberry's pet frog (2003)
  - Huckleberry Hash, Huckleberry's filly friend (2003)
  - Tom-Tom, Huckleberry's pet coonhound (2013)
  - Red Hot, Huckleberry's pet ferret (2021)
- Blueberry Muffin: A recurring friend of Strawberry, she tends to be portrayed as either a carefree ditz or a book-loving reader.
  - Cheesecake, Blueberry's pet mouse (1980s, 2003, 2021)
  - Blueberry Sundae, Blueberry's filly friend (2003)
  - Scouty, Blueberry's pet border collie (2013)
- Plum Puddin': Strawberry's smartest friend, they have been portrayed as both a boy (1980s, 2021) and a girl (1980s, 2003, 2009).
  - Elderberry, Plum's pet owl (1980s)
  - Pitterpatch, Plum's pet Parson Russell terrier (2013)
- Raspberry Tart/Raspberry Torte: Strawberry's sharp tongue friend, she has a tendency to be insensitive, but learns to grow out of her behavior.
  - Rhubarb, Raspberry's pet monkey (1980s)
  - Rhubarb, Raspberry's pet raccoon (2003)
  - Raspberry Ripple, Raspberry's filly (2003)
  - Chiffon, Raspberry's pet chihuahua (2013)
- Apple Dumplin': Strawberry's youngest friend and sometimes relative. In 2009 and 2021, she is the same age as Strawberry.
  - Teatime Turtle, Apple's pet turtle (1980s, 2015)
  - Apple Ducklin', Apple's pet duckling (2003)
- Orange Blossom: Strawberry's best and closest friend, she is the first African-American character that was introduced in the franchise.
  - Marmalade, Orange's pet butterfly (1980s, 2003)
  - Marmalade, Orange's pet dachshund (2009)
  - Orange Twist, Orange's filly friend (2003)
- Lemon Meringue: Strawberry's most stylish friend, she is an expert on beauty and a bit vain, but is ultimately a sweet girl.
  - Frappé, Lemon's pet frog (1980s, 2021)
  - Sourball, Lemon's pet skunk (2003)
  - Lemon Ice, Lemon's filly (2003)
  - Henna, Lemon's pet cocker spaniel (2013)
- T.N. Honey: A British scientist Strawberry befriended while visiting Big Apple City.
- Apricot: A baby who speaks only in big words. In 2003, she is the same age as Strawberry.
  - Hopsalot, Apricot's pet rabbit (1980s, 2003)
- Angel Cake: Strawberry's nicest friend, Angel is very well-mannered and always acts polite. In 2003, she is depicted as a bit bossy but still shows a good side.
  - Souffle, Angel's pet skunk (1980s)
  - Vanilla Icing, Angel's pet lamb (2003)
  - Milkshake, Angel's filly friend (2003)
- Butter Cookie: A baby friend of Strawberry.
  - Jelly Bear, Butter's pet bear (1980s)
- Lime Chiffon: A ballerina who sometimes has her head in the clouds. In 2003, she is a superstar named Lime Light. In 2021, she is an intelligent reader.
  - Parfait, Lime's pet parrot (1980s, 2021)
- Cherry Cuddler: One of Strawberry's younger friends who always loves hugs.
  - Gooseberry, Cherry's pet goose (1980s, 2003)
- Café Ole: Strawberry's Mexican friend from Mexicocoa.
  - Burrito, Café's pet donkey (1980s)
- Almond Tea/Tea Blossom: Strawberry's Chinese friend from China Cup.
  - Marza Panda, Tea's pet panda (1980s, 2003)
- Mint Tulip: Strawberry's Dutch friend from Hollandaise.
  - Marsh Mallard, Mint's pet duck (1980s)
- Crepe Suzette: Strawberry's French friend from Pearis, she is also a fashion designer.
  - Eclair Poodle, Crepe's pet poodle (1980s, 2007)
- Lem & Ada: Strawberry's British friends from Pickledilly Circus, they are identical twin babies.
  - Sugar Woofer, Lem and Ada's pet sheepdog (1980s)
- Baby Needs-A-Name: An unnamed baby who accompanies Peach Blush, her wish is to be given a name someday.
  - Fig Boot, Baby Needs-A-Name's pet lizard monster (1980s)
- Peach Blush: A Southern friend of Plum Puddin' from the Land of the Magnolias.
  - Melonie Belle, Peach's pet lamb (1980s)
- Banana Twirl: Strawberry's most athletic friend, she treats everything as an exercise.
- The Berry Princess: A magical princess in charge of the Berrykins, she has many powers and is a gentle woman.
- The Berrykins: Tiny creatures associated with fruit.
- Purple Pie Man: The main villain of the franchise, he is a conniving baker who always plots against Strawberry.
  - Captain Cackle and the Berry Birds, Pie Man's pet crows (1980s, 2003, 2016 comic, 2021)
  - Dobbin, Pie Man's draft stallion (2003)
- Sour Grapes (Adult): The Pie Man's partner-in-crime. In 2003, they are siblings.
  - Dregs, Sour's pet snake (1980s, 2003)
- Raisin Cane: Sour Grapes' niece who is not as evil as her. In 2009, she is Sour Grapes' cousin. In 2021, they are a non-binary drummer.
  - Durt, Raisin's pet worm (1980s comic, 2016 comic)

=== Introduced in 2003 ===
- Ginger Snap: A talkative mechanic from Cookie Corners.
  - Chocolate Chipmunk, Ginger's pet chipmunk (2003)
  - Cookie Dough, Ginger's filly friend (2003)
- Peppermint Fizz: Strawberry's friend who can be stubborn, but becomes much nicer as the series progresses.
  - Cola, Peppermint's pet chameleon (2003)
  - Cherry Vanilla, Peppermint's filly friend (2003)
- Banana Candy: The mayor of Banana Borough and its sole resident, she performs every job in town.
- Coco Calypso
  - Papaya Parrot, Coco's pet parrot (2003)
  - Spumoni, Coco's filly friend (2003)
- Frosty Puff: Strawberry's Norwegian friend from Niceland.
  - Freezer Pop, Frosty's pet penguin (2003)
- Rainbow Sherbet: A sailor who moves to Strawberryland, she always speaks in sailor terminology.
  - Triple Ripple, Rainbow's pet toucan (2003)
  - Butter Pecan, Rainbow's filly friend (2003)
- Seaberry Delight
  - Kiwi, Seaberry's pet sea turtle (2003)
  - Pistachio, Seaberry's filly friend (2003)
- Tangerina Torta: Strawberry's Brazilian friend from the Tangerine Bosque.
  - Banana Bongo, Tangerina's pet monkey (2003)
- Annie Oatmeal: The owner of the Berry Prairie Dude Ranch, she is based on sharpshooter Annie Oakley.
- Caramel Corn: Strawberry's farmer friend from the countryside.
- Watermelon Kiss
- Licorice Whip: An evil ringmaster who kidnaps horses for his traveling show.
  - Raven: Licorice Whip's former pet raven, he betrayed his master to help Strawberry foil his scheme.

=== Introduced in 2009 ===
- Cherry Jam: A famous and talented singer who has issues with the spotlight.
  - Cinnapup, Cherry's pet dalmatian (2013)
- Sour Grapes (Young Girl): A younger version of Sour Grapes, she is a teenager who is mean at first but becomes a friend of Strawberry.
  - A pet crow (2021)
- Sweet Grapes: Sour Grapes' twin sister, she is the opposite of Sour, being very nice.

=== Introduced in 2021 ===
- Bread Pudding: The fashionable and stuck-up assistant manager of the Berryworks, he starts off as an enemy of Strawberry, but eventually becomes her friend.
- Aunt Praline: Strawberry's aunt who lives in Big Apple City, she works as Mayor Molasses' chief of staff.
- Banoffee: A transgender woman fashion model.
- Boysenberry Mousse: An obnoxious teenage businessman from Berryville who tries to destroy the town for his business.
  - Parsley: Boysenberry's AI assistant who misinterprets his commands.
- Candy Corn: A kid from Niblet's Hollow, the neighboring town of Strawberry's hometown Berryville, she is a shy and talented inventor who everyone sees as cute.
- Caramel Tartufo: The founder of Fruitleg Alley, he is based on Don Corleone from The Godfather.
- Caramela Éclair: Caramel Tartufo's daughter who helps him run Fruitleg Alley.
- Cheese Strudel: A German boy who works as Crabapple Jam's assistant.
- Cherry Blossom: Orange Blossom's mother
- Cherry Crisp: Orange Blossom's older sister.
- Cherry Streusel: Cheese Strudel's twin sister who also works for Crabapple Jam.
- Cinnamon Swirl: A magical Berry Guardian who delivers cookies on Winterswirl, she is based on Santa Claus.
- Crabapple Jam: An elderly celebrity baker, she acts as a sweet grandma figure in public, but is actually a mean lady who schemes against Strawberry.
- Crusty Muffin: Candy Corn's grumpy and intimidating uncle, he runs the Fright Fall Fun Fair.
- Everything Bagel: Blueberry Muffin's annoying younger brother.
- Everything Muffin: Blueberry Muffin's mother.
- Figgy Pudding: Bread Pudding's mother and boss.
  - Creampuff: Figgy's pet pomeranian
- Fluffy Chiffon: One of Lime Chiffon's fathers, he is a famous fashion designer.
- Genoise LaCreme: A famous food critic.
- Honeydew Sorbet: A baby friend of Strawberry, she is the granddaughter of Mrs. Crumbcake.
- J. Quincy Cupcake: The founder of Big Apple City and the Berryworks, who passed away a long time ago.
- Jelly Roll: One of Everything Bagel's annoying friends.
- Johnnycake Cobbler: A scam artist and the brother of The Purple Pie Man.
- Kiki KeyLime: A celebrity baker who hosts the cooking competition Bite of the City, she is very nice to Strawberry. She becomes the girlfriend of Aunt Praline in Season 3.
- Lemon Drop: Lemon Meringue's embarrassing father.
- Lemon Tort & Lime Tart: Two former friends of Lemon Meringue and Lime Chiffon who now work together.
- Lime Pops: Lime Chiffon's other father, he is an archeologist.
- Mr. Mangosteen: A friendly shopkeeper who runs a fruit stand.
- Mrs. Crumbcake: An elderly woman who takes care of her granddaughter, Honeydew Sorbet.
- Orange Crisp: Orange Blossom's father.
- Peach Trifle: A customer at the Berryworks who hosts an annual Fall Ball.
- Peanut Butter Crisp: Everything Bagel's other annoying friend.
- Pineapple Cobbler: Strawberry Shortcake's older brother, he is more traditional and less friendly.
- Pumpkin Spice: An influencer in Big Apple City, she acts nice on camera, but is actually mean.
- Strawberry Cobbler: Strawberry Shortcake's mother.

== List of relaunches ==
Franchise iteration	Description	Notes	First appearance
1980s launch / Generation 1	The original Kenner dolls and TV specials, featuring vintage artwork and whimsical fantasy settings.		Greeting cards (1979 & 1980s) and TV: The World of Strawberry Shortcake (1980), Strawberry Shortcake in Big Apple City (1981), Strawberry Shortcake: Pets on Parade (1982), Strawberry Shortcake: Housewarming Surprise (1983), Strawberry Shortcake and the Baby Without a Name (1984) and Strawberry Shortcake Meets the Berrykins (1985) (Strawberry Shortcake television specials)
1991 relaunch / Generation 2	Short-lived reboot with a more modernized '90s look.		THQ line
2003 relaunch / Generation 3	Major revival with CGI animation, divided into Gen 3.0 (2003–2007) in Season 1-3 and Gen 3.5 (2007–2008) in Season 4 with slight redesigns.		"Meet Strawberry Shortcake" (2003) (Strawberry Shortcake)
2009 relaunch / Generation 4	Full redesign with a sleeker CGI look and new continuity; featured "Berry Bitty Adventures" series.		Films: The Strawberry Shortcake Movie: Sky's the Limit (2009) and TV: "Fish Out of Water" (Strawberry Shortcake's Berry Bitty Adventures)
2021 relaunch / Generation 5	"Berry in the Big City" with a new art style and modern city setting.		"Berry In The Big City" (Strawberry Shortcake: Berry in the Big City)
2026 relaunch / Generation 6	CGI take on the classic 1980's designs.		"You've Got Berry Mail" (The World of Strawberry Shortcake short-form miniseries)

== Media ==
=== Albums & soundtracks ===
Kid Stuff Records released albums based on Strawberry Shortcake in the early 1980s. After the 2003 revival, Koch Records issued soundtrack CDs containing music from the TV series and DVDs, as well as one for the film. A CD was also released along with a piano book.

=== Video games ===
The first Strawberry Shortcake video game was produced in 1983 for the Atari 2600. No further games based on the franchise were produced until 20 years later, in 2003, when Strawberry Shortcake: Amazing Cookie Party was released for PC. Since then, games have been published for the Game Boy Advance, PlayStation 2, Nintendo DS, PC, and Mac. A standalone plug-and-play game based on Konami's Dance Dance Revolution franchise was also produced. In addition, mobile apps for the iOS and Android platforms have been released.

== Controversies ==
=== Penny Arcade ===
In 2003, the webcomic Penny Arcade posted an "advertisement" for a fictional computer game, American McGee's Strawberry Shortcake, a parody of the actual computer game American McGee's Alice, a twisted and violent take on Lewis Carroll's works. American Greetings took offense to the parody and issued a cease-and-desist letter, to which the authors begrudgingly complied (but not without making their indignation very clear). A follow-up strip cites bad timing as a contributing factor to the situation; according to the strip, Holkins and Krahulik were not aware that American Greetings was about to relaunch the Strawberry Shortcake line at that time.

Some argue that Penny Arcade's case was not covered under the fair use doctrine because the use of the characters, in this case, was for satire; they claim that fair use only protects the unauthorized use of copyrighted characters in parodies of the original material, and that satire and parody are totally different concepts. Others, however, take the view that parody and satire are equally protected by law. Penny Arcade did not intend to offend American Greetings in the comic, but instead American McGee and McFarlane Toys, who collaborated to create a toy line based on a dark and twisted version of The Wonderful Wizard of Oz.

Various animated television shows, including Futurama ("Saturday Morning Fun Pit"), Drawn Together, Robot Chicken, The Fairly OddParents ("Channel Chasers"), and South Park ("Imaginationland Episode II") have since also parodied or satirized Strawberry Shortcake in various ways.

=== Cookie Jar's lawsuit ===
In 2008, Cookie Jar Entertainment began the process to merge with DIC Entertainment, who held the rights to the Strawberry Shortcake animated series. The merger was completed on July 23. On the same day as the finalization of the merger, Cookie Jar Entertainment announced further intentions to acquire the Strawberry Shortcake franchise (along with Care Bears and Sushi Pack) from American Greetings itself. The deal was expected to finalize on September 30, but up until April 2009, there was no further word on the status of the acquisition.

Cookie Jar delayed the acquisition that December due to difficulty in financing it. It was also revealed that Cookie Jar offered (US) $195 million for the franchise. Due to the situation, American Greetings put the franchise back on sale. French company MoonScoop expressed interest and offered (US) $95 million for the franchise, $100 million less than what was offered by Cookie Jar, who competed against MoonScoop's bid, having until the end of April 2009 to counter the offer. This led to various lawsuits between Cookie Jar, American Greetings, and MoonScoop.

In November 2012, American Greetings emerged as the victor of the case and retained ownership of the brands. Iconix Brand Group later bought the Strawberry Shortcake brand from American Greetings in February 2015 for (US) $105 million, $10 million more than what was offered by Moonscoop.
