= Russi Taylor =

American voice actress (1944–2019)

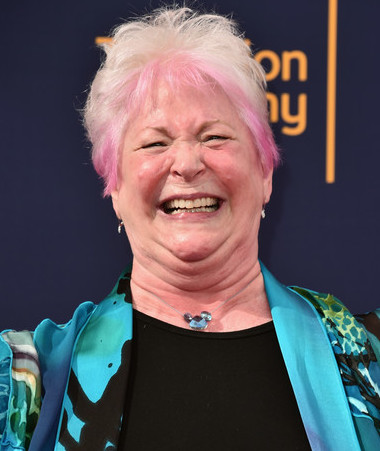
- Taylor in 2018
- Born: May 4, 1944; Cambridge, Massachusetts, U.S.
- Died: July 26, 2019 (aged 75); Glendale, California, U.S.
- Resting place: Forest Lawn Memorial Park
- Occupation: Voice actress
- Years active: 1976–2019
- Spouse: Wayne Allwine (m. 1991; died 2009)

Russi Taylor (May 4, 1944 – July 26, 2019) was an American voice actress. She was best known for voicing the character of Minnie Mouse in English from 1986 to 2019 and was married to voice actor Wayne Allwine, the voice of Mickey Mouse, from 1991 until his death in 2009. She was the longest-tenured voice actress to voice the character, holding the role for 33 years. She also provided the voices of several characters in The Simpsons, most prominently Martin Prince, Uter Zorker, and Sherri and Terri.

== Early life ==
Taylor was born in Cambridge, Massachusetts, on May 4, 1944.

== Career ==
Taylor began her voice-over career in the mid-1970s. Her first voice-over role was the voice of Ted and Georgette's baby on The Mary Tyler Moore Show. Taylor became the voice of Minnie Mouse in 1986, and continued to voice the character for 33 years until her death in 2019 at the age of 75. She also voiced Huey, Dewey, and Louie and Webby Vanderquack in the television series DuckTales and in other appearances. Taylor provided the voices of numerous characters in the animated series The Simpsons, including fourth-grade nerd Martin Prince, purple-haired twins Sherri and Terri and German exchange student Üter. After her death, The Simpsons producers cast Grey DeLisle as her characters.

She voiced Pebbles Flintstone in The Flintstone Comedy Show for Hanna-Barbera in 1980. Taylor was also the original voice of Strawberry Shortcake and the voice of Baby Gonzo in Muppet Babies, Nova in Twinkle, the Dream Being, Pac-Baby in the television series Pac-Man, the high-pitched Nurses that were mice in The Rescuers Down Under, Melissa in the Pound Puppies episode Garbage Night: The Musical, Queen Rosedust in My Little Pony and Birdie the Early Bird in McDonaldland commercials. She was also the voice of Drizella and the Fairy Godmother in the Cinderella sequels, Cinderella II: Dreams Come True and Cinderella III: A Twist in Time.

== Personal life ==
In 1988, Taylor met her husband Wayne Allwine, during a recording session of Totally Minnie. They married in 1991 and remained married up until his death in 2009. In 2008, a year before Allwine's death, they were both named Disney Legends.

== Death ==
Taylor died from colon cancer on July 26, 2019, at her home in Glendale, California, at the age of 75. She is now interred at Forest Lawn Memorial Park next to Allwine's grave. Kaitlyn Robrock became the current voice of Minnie Mouse later that year.

== Filmography ==
=== Film ===
List of voice performances in feature films
Year	Title	Role(s)	Notes
1980	The Private Eyes	Doll	
1986	My Little Pony: The Movie	Morning Glory, Rosedust, Skunk, Bushwoolie	
1986	The Adventures of the American Rabbit	Mother, Lamb	
1987	Sport Goofy in Soccermania	Huey, Dewey, Louie, Grandma Duck	Short film
1988	Who Framed Roger Rabbit	Minnie Mouse, Birds	
1990	Jetsons: The Movie	Fergie Furbelow	
1990	DuckTales the Movie: Treasure of the Lost Lamp	Huey, Dewey, Louie, Webby	
1990	The Rescuers Down Under	Nurse Mouse	
1995	Babe	Duchess	
1995	Runaway Brain	Minnie Mouse	Short film
1998	Babe: Pig in the City	The Pink Poodle, Choir Cat	
1998	A Bug's Life	Additional voices	
1999	Fantasia 2000	Daisy Duck	Screaming only
2005	Pom Poko	Otama	
2007	The Simpsons Movie	Martin Prince	
2013	Get a Horse!	Minnie Mouse	Short film

List of voice performances in direct-to-video and television films
Year	Title	Role	Notes
1989	The Adventures of Ronald McDonald: McTreasure Island	Birdie, Parrot	
1990	Disney Sing-Along Songs: Disneyland Fun	Minnie Mouse	
1994–95	Mickey's Fun Songs series	Minnie Mouse	
1995	The Tale of Tillie's Dragon	Pie Lady	
1998	The Spirit of Mickey	Minnie Mouse	
1998	The Brave Little Toaster Goes to Mars	Robbie	
1999	Mickey's Once Upon a Christmas	Minnie Mouse, Huey, Dewey, Louie	
2001	Mickey's Magical Christmas: Snowed in at the House of Mouse	Minnie Mouse	
2002	Cinderella II: Dreams Come True	Fairy Godmother, Mary, Beatrice, Daphne, Countess Le Grande, Drizella Tremaine	
2002	Mickey's House of Villains	Minnie Mouse	
2004	Mickey, Donald, Goofy: The Three Musketeers	Minnie Mouse	
2004	Mickey's Twice Upon a Christmas	Minnie Mouse, Huey, Dewey, Louie	
2004	Nine Dog Christmas	Little Girl, Agnes Anne	
2006	The Fox and the Hound 2	Widow Tweed	
2007	Cinderella III: A Twist in Time	Fairy Godmother, Drizella Tremaine	
2007	Disney Princess Enchanted Tales: Follow Your Dreams	Fauna	
2008	Scooby-Doo! and the Goblin King	The Owl Witch, Tiddlywink	
2015	The Flintstones & WWE: Stone Age SmackDown!	Pebbles Flintstone	

=== Television ===
List of voice performances in television shows
Year	Title	Role	Notes
1976	The Mary Tyler Moore Show	Ted and Georgette's Baby	1 episode
1980	The World of Strawberry Shortcake	Strawberry Shortcake	
1980–81	The Flintstone Comedy Show	Pebbles Flintstone, Cavemouse	19 episodes
1980–81	Heathcliff	Barbie Winslow	13 episodes
1981–89	The Smurfs	Smoogle	
1981	Strawberry Shortcake in Big Apple City	Strawberry Shortcake	
1982	Strawberry Shortcake: Pets on Parade	Strawberry Shortcake	
1982	The Little Rascals	Dolly	
1982	Christmas Comes to Pac-Land	Pac-Baby	
1982–83	Pac-Man	Pac-Baby	17 episodes
1983	Peter and the Magic Egg	Lollichop	
1983	Strawberry Shortcake: Housewarming Surprise	Strawberry Shortcake	
1983–85	Dungeons & Dragons	Amber the Fairie Dragon	
1984	Strawberry Shortcake and the Baby Without a Name	Strawberry Shortcake	
1984–91	Muppet Babies	Gonzo, Camilla, Robin	107 episodes
1985, 1994	ABC Weekend Special	Hasy, Leota	Episode: "The Adventures of Teddy Ruxpin"; Episode: "The Magic Flute"
1985	Strawberry Shortcake Meets the Berrykins	Strawberry Shortcake, Strawberrykin	
1985	Kissyfur	Miss Emmy Lou, Beehonie, Toot, Cackle Sister, Donna	
1985	Adventures of the Gummi Bears	Madame Placebo	
1986	My Little Pony	Rosedust, Cupcake, Morning Glory	
1986	Glo Friends	Glo Cappy	
1987	Sport Goofy in Soccermania	Huey, Dewey, Louie, Grandma Duck	Special
1987	Blondie and Dagwood	Cora Dithers, Mrs. Hannon	
1987	D-TV series	Minnie Mouse, Dalmatian Puppies	
1987–88	Little Clowns of Happytown	Ralphie	18 episodes
1987–88	Yogi's Treasure Hunt	Candy Girl	Episode: "The Greed Monster"
1987–90	DuckTales	Huey, Dewey, Louie, Webby	92 episodes
1988	Totally Minnie	Minnie Mouse	
1988	Scooby-Doo and the Ghoul School	Phantasma	Special
1988	Superman	Lana Lang (young)	
1988	The Magical World of Disney	Minnie Mouse	Episode: "Mickey's 60th Birthday"
1989–90	Dink, the Little Dinosaur	Squirt	
1989	Blondie & Dagwood: Second Wedding Workout	Cora Dithers	
1990–2019	The Simpsons	Martin Prince, Sherri, Terri, Wendell Borton, Uter Zorker, Lewis Clark, Martha Prince, Sydney Swift	193 episodes
1990–91	Widget	Widget	
1990	Cartoon All-Stars to the Rescue	Gonzo, Huey, Dewey, Louie	
1990–96	What-a-Mess	Esmeralda	
1991–93	Mr. Bogus	Brattus, Dust Bullies	
1992	Mickey's Nutcracker	Minnie Mouse	Uncredited
1992	Adventures of Sonic the Hedgehog	Miles "Tails" Prower	Unaired pilot
1992–94	The Little Mermaid	Pearl's Mom	
1992–93	Twinkle, the Dream Being	Nova	
1993–94	Bonkers	Missing Toon Kid	
1993	Hollyrock-a-Bye Baby	Baby Pebbles Flintsone	Television film
1993	The Magic Paintbrush	Haley	
1993	Biker Mice from Mars	Weathermeister	Episode: "Chill Zone"
1994–95	The Critic	Penny Tompkins, Effeminate Kid	10 episodes
1994	Aladdin	Woman	
1994	A Flintstones Christmas Carol	Pebbles Flintsone	Special
1995	The Baby Huey Show	Momma	
1995	Capitol Critters	Bluebird	
1995–99	Timon & Pumbaa	Fairy	
1995–97	What a Cartoon!	Baby, Hard Luck Duck	
1995–96	The Hot Rod Dogs and Cool Car Cats	Carbs, Jag	7 episodes
1996	Quack Pack	Helga Needlehofer	Episode: "Take My Duck, Please"
1999	The Wild Thornberrys	Inga	
1999–2000	Mickey Mouse Works	Minnie Mouse, Clara Cluck	
2000–01	Buzz Lightyear of Star Command	Becky, Old Lady	
2001–03	House of Mouse	Minnie Mouse, Clara Cluck, Fairy Godmother, Duchess, Fauna, Toothpaste Commercial Boy	51 episodes
2002	Shin Chan	Various characters	Vitello dub
2003	Kim Possible	Rocket Booster #2	
2003–04	Clifford's Puppy Days	Mrs. Zablione, Tricsie	
2003–07	Jakers! The Adventures of Piggley Winks	Fernando "Ferny" Toro, Annie Winks, Mom	46 episodes
2005	Teen Titans	Melvin, Timmy	
2006–16	Mickey Mouse Clubhouse	Minnie Mouse, Quoodles	121 episodes
2011–16	Minnie's Bow-Toons	Minnie Mouse	40 episodes
2011–16	Jake and the Never Land Pirates	Never Bird, Gilly, Hermit Crab	16 episodes
2012	Sofia the First: Once Upon a Princess	Fauna	Television film
2013	Sofia the First	Fauna, Cedric's Mother, Mrs. Higgins	
2013	Wheel of Fortune	Minnie Mouse	Episode: Making Disney Memories Week
2013–19	Mickey Mouse	Minnie Mouse, Huey, Dewey, Louie, The Witch	96 episodes
2016	The Lion Guard	Muhanga the Aardvark and Mbuni the Ostrich	8 episodes
2017–21	Mickey Mouse Mixed-Up Adventures	Minnie Mouse, Clara Cluck, Mrs. McSnorter	71 episodes
2018	Rapunzel's Tangled Adventure	Florina, Lorb Guard	
2018	OK K.O.! Let's Be Heroes	Phantasma	Episode: "Monster Party"
2018	DuckTales	Young Donald Duck	Episode: "Last Christmas"
2019	Star vs. the Forces of Evil	Old Lady	Episode: "Beach Day", final TV role

=== Video games ===
List of voice performances in video games
Year	Title	Role	Notes
1990	DuckTales: The Quest for Gold	Huey, Dewey, Louie, Webby	
1992	King's Quest VI: Heir Today, Gone Tomorrow	Celeste	
1993	Quest for Glory: Shadows of Darkness	Tanya Markarov	
1996	The Simpsons Cartoon Studio	Martin Prince	
1997	The Simpsons: Virtual Springfield	Martin Prince	
1997	101 Dalmatians Animated StoryBook	Lucky, Nanny	
1998	My Disney Kitchen	Minnie Mouse	
1999	Gabriel Knight 3: Blood of the Sacred, Blood of the Damned	Simone	
2000	Mickey Mouse Preschool	Minnie Mouse, Huey, Dewey, Louie	
2000	Mickey Mouse Kindergarten	Minnie Mouse	
2000	Mickey Mouse Toddler	Minnie Mouse, Gopher	
2000	The Flintstones: Bedrock Bowling	Pebbles Flintstone	
2000	Donald Duck Goin' Quackers	Huey, Dewey, Louie	
2001	Disney Learning: Phonics Quest	Minnie Mouse	
2002	Disney Learning Adventure: Search for the Secret Keys	Minnie Mouse	
2002	Kingdom Hearts	Minnie Mouse	
2002	Disney Golf	Minnie Mouse	
2002	Disney's PK: Out of the Shadows	Huey, Dewey, Louie	
2002	Disney Sports Soccer	Minnie Mouse, Huey, Dewey, Louie	
2002	Disney Sports Skateboarding	Minnie Mouse	
2002	Disney Sports Football	Minnie Mouse, Huey, Dewey, Louie	
2002	Disney Sports Basketball	Minnie Mouse, Huey, Dewey, Louie	
2003	Disney's Party	Minnie Mouse	
2003	Disney's Hide and Sneak	Minnie Mouse	
2006	Kingdom Hearts II	Minnie Mouse, Fauna	
2007	Disney Princess: Enchanted Journey	Fairy Godmother, Student Crab	
2007	The Simpsons Game	Martin Prince, Sherri, Terri, Uter Zorker	
2008	WALL-E	Axiom Passenger	
2008	Disney Think Fast	Minnie Mouse	
2010	Kingdom Hearts: Birth by Sleep	Minnie Mouse, Drizella Tremaine, Fairy Godmother, Fauna, Huey, Dewey, Louie	
2011	Kinect Disneyland Adventures	Minnie Mouse	
2012	Kingdom Hearts 3D: Dream Drop Distance	Minnie Mouse	
2013	DuckTales: Remastered	Huey, Dewey, Louie, Webby	
2013	Castle of Illusion Starring Mickey Mouse	Minnie Mouse	
2014	Disney Magical World	Minnie Mouse	
2015	Disney Infinity 3.0	Minnie Mouse	
2019	Kingdom Hearts III	Huey, Dewey, and Louie	

=== Theme park attractions ===
List of voice performances in theme parks
Year	Title	Role	Notes
2003	Mickey's PhilharMagic	Minnie Mouse	Unseen
2008	The Simpsons Ride	Martin Prince	
2020	Mickey & Minnie's Runaway Railway	Minnie Mouse	Posthumous

== Awards and nominations ==
Awards and nominations
Year	Award	Category	Title	Result	Refs
2005	DVDX Award	Best Animated Character Performance	Mickey's Twice Upon a Christmas	Nominated	
2005	Annie Awards	Best Voice Acting in an Animated Television Production	Jakers! The Adventures of Piggley Winks	Nominated	
2006	Daytime Emmy Award	Outstanding Performer in an Animated Program	Jakers! The Adventures of Piggley Winks	Nominated	
2007	Daytime Emmy Award	Outstanding Performer in an Animated Program	Jakers! The Adventures of Piggley Winks	Nominated	
2007	Annie Awards	Best Voice Acting in an Animated Television Production	Jakers! The Adventures of Piggley Winks	Nominated	
2008	Disney Legend Award	Animation - Voice		Won	
2012	Behind the Voice Actors Special/DVD Voice Acting Award	Best Vocal Ensemble in a TV Special/Direct-to-DVD Title or Short	Sofia the First: Once Upon a Princess	Nominated	
2012	Behind the Voice Actors Video Game Voice Acting Award	Best Vocal Ensemble in a Video Game	Kingdom Hearts 3D: Dream Drop Distance	Won	
2013	Behind the Voice Actors Special/DVD Voice Acting Award	Best Vocal Ensemble in a Television Series - Children's/Educational	Mickey Mouse Clubhouse	Nominated	
2013	Behind the Voice Actors Television Voice Acting Award	Best Vocal Ensemble in a Television Series - Children's/Educational	Mickey Mouse Clubhouse	Won	
2013	Behind the Voice Actors Television Voice Acting Award	Best Female Vocal Performance in a Television Series in a Supporting Role - Comedy/Musical	The Simpsons	Nominated	
2014	Behind the Voice Actors Television Voice Acting Award	Best Female Vocal Performance in a Television Series in a Supporting Role - Comedy/Slapstick	Mickey Mouse	Nominated	
2014	Behind the Voice Actors Television Voice Acting Award	Best Female Vocal Performance in a Television Series - Children's/Educational	Mickey Mouse Clubhouse	Nominated	
2014	Behind the Voice Actors Television Voice Acting Award	Best Vocal Ensemble in a Television Series - Children's/Educational	Jake and the Neverland Pirates	Nominated	
2014	NAVGTR Award	Best Performance in a Comedy, Supporting	DuckTales: Remastered	Nominated	
2015	Behind the Voice Actors Television Voice Acting Award	Best Female Vocal Performance in a Television Series in a Supporting Role - Children's/Educational	Mickey Mouse Clubhouse	Nominated	
2015	Behind the Voice Actors Television Voice Acting Award	Best Female Vocal Performance in a Television Series in a Supporting Role - Children's/Educational	Minnie's Bow-Toons	Nominated	
2018	Primetime Emmy Award	Outstanding Character Voice-Over Performance	The Scariest Story Ever: A Mickey Mouse Halloween Spooktacular!	Nominated	

Preceded by Ruth Clifford	Voice of Minnie Mouse; 1986–2019	Succeeded by Kaitlyn Robrock
