= Strawberry Shortcake: Pets on Parade =

1982 animated TV special

- Written by: Romeo Muller
- Directed by: Fred Wolf; Kohsei Ohtani
- Starring: Romeo Muller; Russi Taylor; Robert Ridgely
- Theme music composer: Mark Volman; Howard Kaylan; Performed by: Flo & Eddie; Lyrics: Romeo Muller
- Country of origin: United States
- Original language: English

Production
- Producers: Romeo Muller; Fred Wolf; Tomoh Fukumoto
- Editor: Rich Harrison
- Running time: 23 minutes
- Production companies: Muller/Rosen; Murakami-Wolf-Swenson; Toei Animation; Those Characters from Cleveland (uncredited)

Original release
- Network: Syndication
- Release: April 9, 1982

Strawberry Shortcake: Pets on Parade is an American animated television special from 1982, made by Romeo Muller, Robert L. Rosen and Fred Wolf, and the third featuring the American Greetings character Strawberry Shortcake.

== Synopsis ==
Strawberry Shortcake: Pets on Parade tells of Strawberryland's Second Annual Grand Old Petable Pet Show and Pet Parade. Strawberry and her cat, Custard, are its judges. The Purple Pieman and Sour Grapes try to enter their pets and frame her for cheating.

== Cast ==
Name	Character	Source
Russi Taylor	Strawberry Shortcake	
Robert Ridgely	Peculiar Purple Pieman	
Joan Gerber (Note: Credited as Joanie Gerber.)	Soufflé the Skunk	
Julie McWhirter	Angel Cake / Custard	
Romeo Muller	Mr. Sun / Narrator	

== Release ==
Pets on Parade premiered on April 9, 1982 in 100 U.S. cities. It aired on WCBS in New York City and on KTLA in Los Angeles. It was the last Strawberry Shortcake special Muller/Rosen produced.

== Reception ==
In the 1996 edition of Ballantine Books' Video Movie Guide, Mick Martin and Marsha Porter gave the special two and a half stars out of four.

== Notes ==
Preceded by Strawberry Shortcake in Big Apple City	1980's Strawberry Shortcake specials 1982	Succeeded by Strawberry Shortcake: Housewarming Surprise
