= Strawberry Shortcake in Big Apple City =

1981 animated TV special

- Written by: Romeo Muller
- Directed by: Hal Silvermintz
- Starring: Romeo Muller; Russi Taylor; Robert Ridgely
- Theme music composer: Mark Volman; Howard Kaylan; Performed by: Flo & Eddie; Lyrics: Romeo Muller
- Country of origin: United States
- Original language: English

Production
- Producers: Buzz Potamkin; Romeo Muller
- Editor: Neil Lawrence
- Running time: 23 minutes
- Production companies: Muller/Rosen; Perpetual Motion Pictures; RLR Associates (uncredited); Those Characters from Cleveland (uncredited)

Original release
- Network: Syndication
- Release: April 10, 1981

Strawberry Shortcake in Big Apple City is a 1981 animated television special written by Romeo Muller, produced by Muller and Buzz Potamkin, and directed by Hal Silvermintz. This is the second special to feature the American Greetings character Strawberry Shortcake.

== Synopsis ==
Strawberry Shortcake in Big Apple City chronicles Strawberry Shortcake's trip to Big Apple City (an obvious parallel to New York City, also known as the "Big Apple"), so she can compete in a baking contest at "the little theater off Times Pear" (referencing Times Square). Strawberry's journey, however, is in jeopardy due to the constant interference of Purple Pieman, who is her only competition in the bake-off. The Pieman counts on his kohlrabi cookies and a little trickery to beat Strawberry and her famous strawberry shortcake. A "Spinach Village" is also involved, which is a reference to Greenwich Village.

== Cast ==
Name	Character	Source
Russi Taylor	Strawberry Shortcake	
Robert Ridgely	Peculiar Purple Pieman	
Diane McCannon	Orange Blossom	
Bob Holt	Coco Nutwork	
Romeo Muller	Mr. Sun / Narrator	
Julie McWhirter	Additional voices	
Joan Gerber	Blueberry Muffin / Apple Dumplin' / Apricot	

== Release ==
Strawberry Shortcake in Big Apple City was the second television special sponsored by the Kenner toy company, then owned by General Mills. The special marked the debut of characters such as T.N. Honey, Lemon Meringue and Horse Radish. It premiered on April 10, 1981, on 101 U.S. stations, among them WPIX in New York City, WKBS-TV in Philadelphia, WFLD in Chicago and KTLA in Los Angeles.

Preceded by The World of Strawberry Shortcake	1980's Strawberry Shortcake specials 1981	Succeeded by Strawberry Shortcake: Pets on Parade
