= Muriel Fahrion =

American illustrator

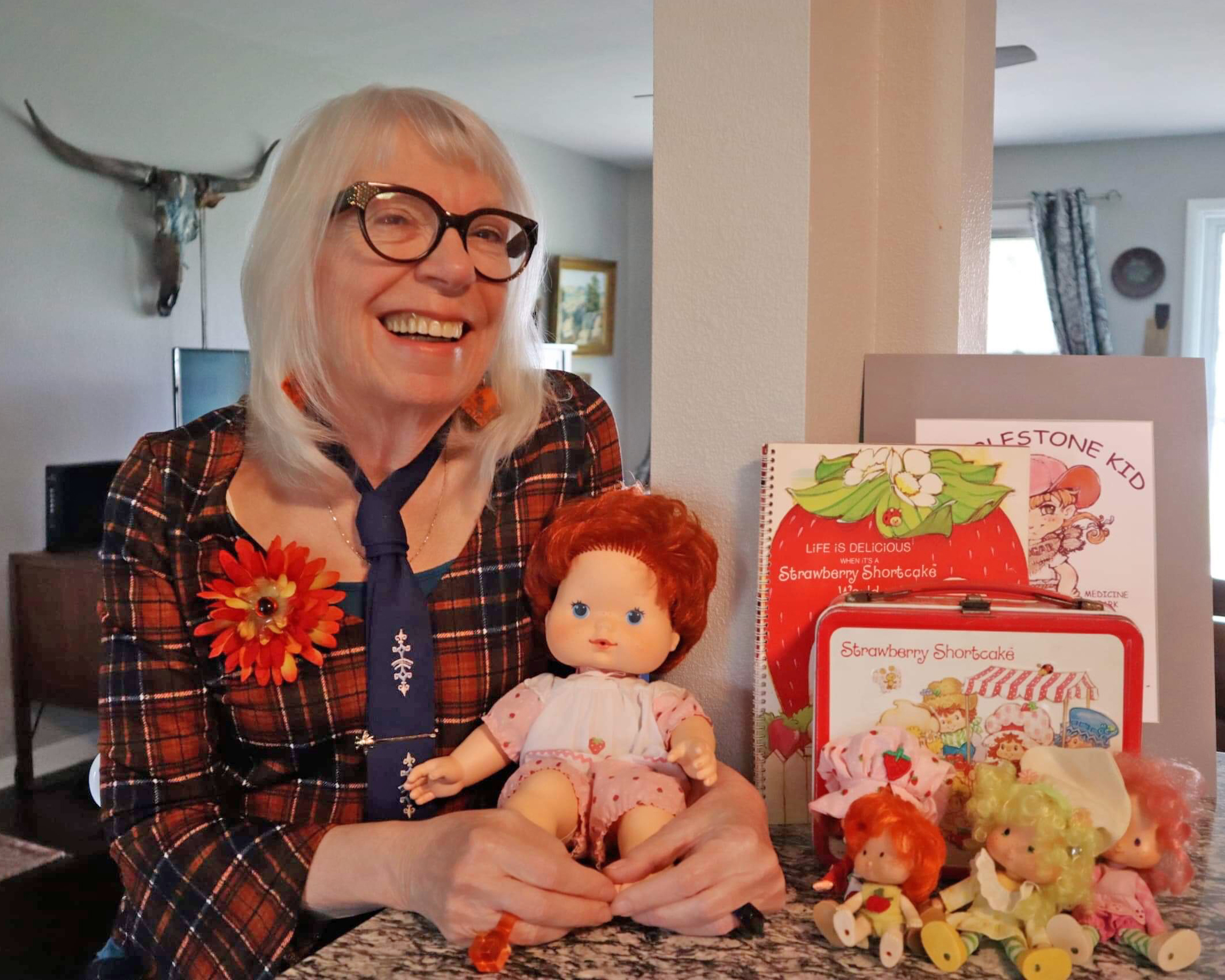
- Fahrion in 2019
- Born: Muriel Norris; June 11, 1945 (age 81); Cleveland, Ohio
- Occupation: Illustrator/Designer
- Years active: 1970s-present
- Employer: Outta Thin Air Studio
- Known for: Care Bears, Strawberry Shortcake and The Get Along Gang
- Website: www.outtathinairstudio.com

Muriel Norris Fahrion (born 1945) is an American illustrator and the original designer of the Strawberry Shortcake franchise.

== Early life and education ==
Muriel Norris Fahrion was born on June 11, 1945, in Cleveland, Ohio, and grew up and went to school in Rocky River, Lakewood, and Cleveland. She was one of seven children of John H. Norris and Catherine (Wunderle) Norris. She began drawing at the age of four and attended free classes at the Cleveland Museum of Art during grammar and high school. After attending Lourdes Academy in Cleveland, she earned a scholarship to the Cooper School of Art in Cleveland, graduating with a major in illustration.

== Career ==
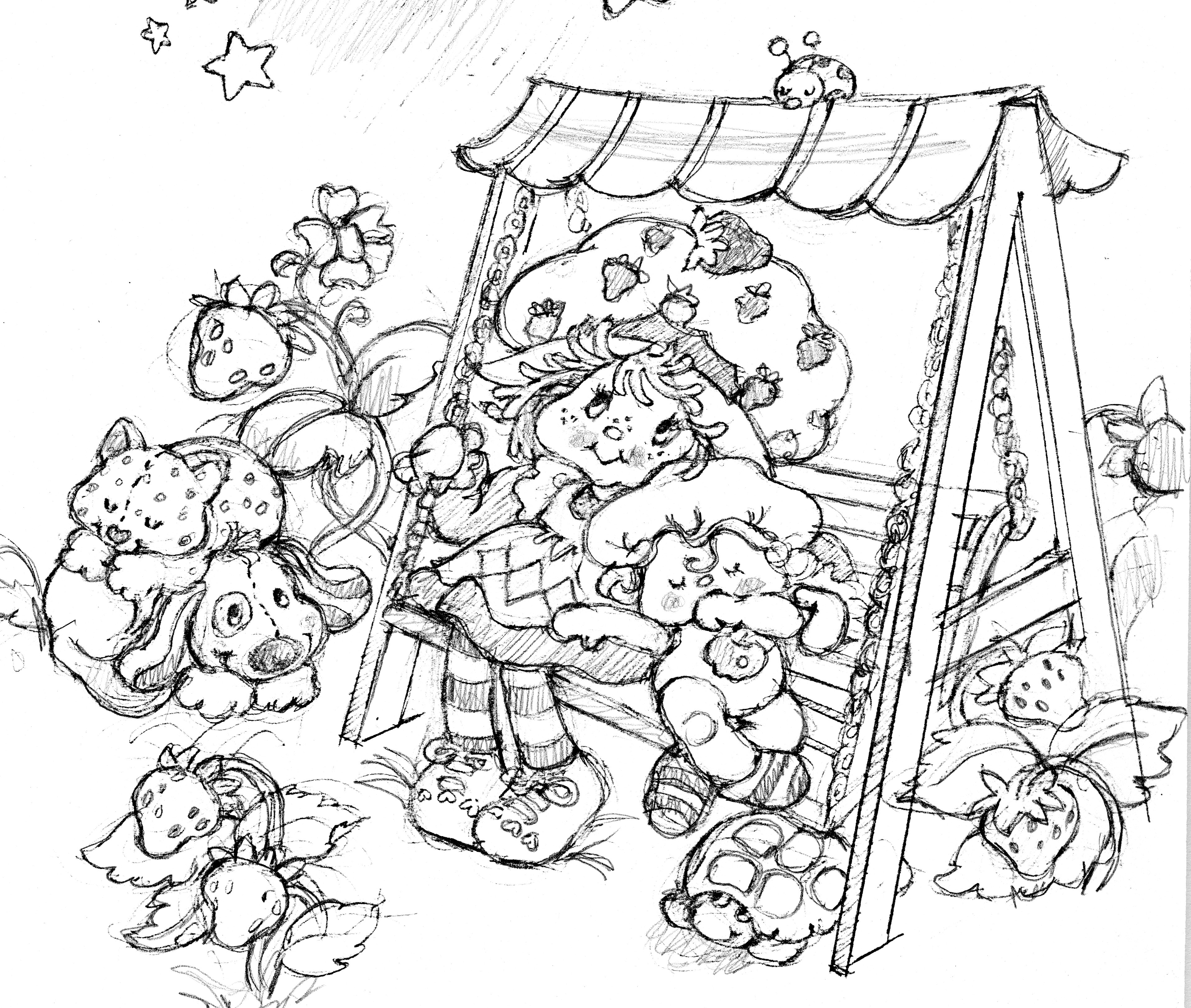
The characters Strawberry Shortcake and Apple Dumplin' drawn by Fahrion

Immediately following art school, Fahrion was hired by American Greetings as a greeting card designer.

In 1977, while Fahrion worked at American Greetings, she was asked to create a rag doll character with a strawberry and daisy theme, in colors of pink and green, for a greeting card series. Fahrion created the original graphic and color depiction for Strawberry Shortcake and her cat Custard, along with Blueberry Muffin and Huckleberry Pie.

Moving to TCFC (Those Characters From Cleveland) in 1978, Fahrion continued on the Shortcake line, eventually depicting 32 characters in total. Her sister, Susan Trentel, crafted the first Strawberry Shortcake doll based on Fahrion's original greeting card design. The line was launched in the winter of 1979 and 1980. The world of Strawberry Shortcake made a big impact, and in two years, it went from a 12 card series to an entire selection of books, clothing, dolls, toy accessories, and home decor. The Shortcake group joined Herself the Elf, Holly Hobbie and Ziggy forming the new toy and licensing division "Those Characters from Cleveland" (TCFC), under the American Greetings banner but located in a separate building. TCFC became a well known think tank for toys and licensing. While there, Fahrion also worked on drawings and ideas for numerous licensing items.

While working for Those Characters From Cleveland, Fahrion participated with other toy design teams which included artists, prototypist and writers. She depicted the first concept art for the characters of The Get Along Gang and Care Bears. Once they were tagged as licensable, both properties moved to other design teams. Like the first Strawberry Shortcake doll, many of the toy models for these designs were first prototyped by her sister Susan Trentel. Strawberry Shortcake, Care Bears and Get-Along-Gang were all subsequently made into animations.

Fahrion took several years away from American Greetings freelancing for Fisher-Price, developing illustrations for the Puffalumps and working with Disney and Snoopy licensing.

American Greetings' toy division was eventually reduced in size and moved back to corporate headquarters. Fahrion became senior art director for Enesco in Chicago. After working a few years at Enesco, Fahrion moved to Noble, Oklahoma in 1995, where she worked for United Design.

Moving to the small town of Medicine Park, Oklahoma, she and her husband, Michael Fahrion, ran a freelance studio entitled Big Rock Works, until they both retired and subsequently moved to Tulsa. Following her husband's death in October 2018, Fahrion relaunched her career under Outta Thin Air Studio, where she created new characters.
