= 1991 in animation =

1991 in animation is an overview of notable events, including notable awards, a list of films released, television show debuts and endings, and notable deaths.

== Events ==
=== January ===
- January 10: The Simpsons episode "Bart Gets Hit by a Car" first airs, with Dr. Nick Riviera and Lionel Hutz making their debuts.
- January 24: The Simpsons episode "One Fish, Two Fish, Blowfish, Blue Fish" first airs, guest starring Larry King and George Takei.
- January 31: The Simpsons episode "The Way We Was" first airs, being the first flashback episode of the series.

=== February ===
- February 7: The Simpsons episode "Homer vs. Lisa and the 8th Commandment" first airs, with Troy McClure making his debut, voiced by Phil Hartman.
- February 14: The Simpsons episode "Principal Charming" first airs, with Groundskeeper Willie, Hans Moleman and Squeaky Voiced Teen making their debuts.
- February 21: The Simpsons episode "Oh Brother, Where Art Thou?" first airs, with Herb Powell and Mona Simpson making their debuts.

=== March ===
- March 7: The Simpsons episode "Bart's Dog Gets an "F"" first airs, guest starring Tracey Ullman. After the episode, the music video for Deep, Deep Trouble is first broadcast.
- March 20: The animation studio Rough Draft Studios is founded.
- March 26: 63rd Academy Awards:
  - Creature Comforts by Nick Park wins the Academy Award for Best Animated Short Film.
- March 28: The Simpsons episode "Old Money" first airs, with Professor Frink making his debut.
- March 29: Tiny Toon Adventures concludes its first season in Syndication with the episode "High Toon".
- March 31: The first episode of Darkwing Duck, broadcast by the Walt Disney Company, airs.

=== April ===
- April 11: The Simpsons episode "Brush with Greatness" first airs, guest starring Ringo Starr.
- April 25: The Simpsons episode "Lisa's Substitute" first airs, guest starring Dustin Hoffman, who is credited as Sam Etic. The episode is further notable for fleshing out Lisa Simpson's character.

=== May ===
- May 1: The Peanuts TV special Snoopy's Reunion premieres on CBS.
- May 2: The Simpsons episode "The War of the Simpsons" first airs, with Snake Jailbird making his debut.
- May 8: The final Garfield TV special Garfield Gets a Life premieres on CBS.
- May 9: The Simpsons episode "Three Men and a Comic Book" first airs, with Comic Book Guy and Radioactive Man making their debuts.

=== July ===
- July 11: The Simpsons concludes its second season on Fox with the episode "Blood Feud".
- July 26: The American film studio Animal Logic is founded.
- Specific date unknown in July: Pee-wee's Playhouse was pulled from its Saturday morning scheduling on CBS due to Paul Reubens' arrest for indecent exposure at an adult movie theater. This program would later air on Adult Swim in 2006 as a "childhood comeback for adults" owing to this issue.

=== August ===
- August 2:
  - Don Bluth's film Rock-a-Doodle premieres in the United Kingdom. This became one of the five lesser Bluth's works and his first lesser film overall. It had some release difficulties after its completion in 1990. It was delayed in the US until April 1992 to avoid competition with Disney's Beauty and the Beast and the first Bluth-less sequel An American Tail: Fievel Goes West.
  - The film Rover Dangerfield, which features a dog modeled after and voiced by comedian Rodney Dangerfield, premieres.
- August 11
  - Nickelodeon introduces its new original cartoon brand titled Nicktoons, with the premiere of its first 3 shows: Doug, Rugrats, & The Ren & Stimpy Show.
    - Rugrats ended up becoming the first longest-running Nicktoon series. The program gained generally positive attention and popularity, as well as becoming an adult interest.
- August 23: After the three-year delay, Felix the Cat: The Movie makes a public marketing, but only as a direct-to-video movie due to financial issues. Following the negative reception in North America, the movie is only available through European markets as of 2011.

=== September ===
- September 3:
  - The first episode of The Legend of Prince Valiant airs, based on the comics series Prince Valiant.
  - The first episode of Little Dracula airs.
- September 7:
  - Hammerman, an animated TV series based on popular rapper M.C. Hammer, premieres, but is cancelled after only one season.
  - The first episode of Rupert airs, an animated TV series based on the British comics character Rupert Bear.
  - The first episode of Taz-Mania airs, starring the Looney Tunes character Tasmanian Devil.
- September 14:
  - Premiere of Back to the Future: The Animated Series, the television adaptation of the 1985 film. It introduces a darker and slightly mature tone for a Saturday-morning cartoon of its time. CBS ended the series after the second season, as it was not as successful as the films of the Back to the Future franchise.
  - Season 4 of Garfield and Friends begins on CBS with the premiere of the following episodes:
    - "Moo Cow Mutt/Big Bad Buddy Bird/Angel Puss"
    - "Trial and Error/An Egg-Citing Story/Supermarket Mania"
  - The first episode of ProStars airs and features the animated versions of real-life sports players, Michael Jordan, Bo Jackson, and Wayne Gretzky.
  - The first episode of Super Mario World airs. This third installment of Super Mario Bros. by DIC Entertainment was made under regulations of the Children's Television Act by inserting moral and educational values while eliminating instances that are closer to the 16bit game due to promotional restrictions for children. This attempt was not successful. The third season of Captain N: The Game Master, which paired with the Mario episodes, have suffered some limits as well, but was cancelled after 7 episodes.
- September 16: Season 2 of Tiny Toon Adventures begins in Syndication with the premiere of the episode "Pledge Day".
- September 19: Season 3 of The Simpsons begins on Fox with the premiere of the episode "Stark Raving Dad", guest starring Michael Jackson, who is credited as John Jay Smith.
- September 26:
  - The first episode of Spider! airs.
  - The Simpsons episode "Mr. Lisa Goes to Washington" first airs.
- September 28: The first episode of Mr. Bogus airs, an adaptation of a series of French-Belgian claymation shorts, here done in traditional animation.

=== October ===
- October 2: Nelvana's critically acclaimed adaptation of Hergé's comics series Tintin, The Adventures of Tintin is first broadcast.
- October 3: The Simpsons episode "When Flanders Failed" first airs.
- October 10: The Simpsons episode "Bart the Murderer" first airs, where Fat Tony, Legs and Louie make their debuts.
- October 11: Gertie the Dinosaur is added to the National Film Registry.
- October 17: The Simpsons episode "Homer Defined" first airs, guest starring Magic Johnson and Chick Hearn.
- October 24: The Simpsons episode "Like Father, Like Clown" first airs, where Krusty the Clown is revealed to be Jewish; it also guest stars Jackie Mason.
- October 28: The first episode of Once Upon a Time... The Americas airs.
- October 31: The Simpsons episode "Treehouse of Horror II" first airs.

=== November ===
- November 7: The Simpsons episode "Lisa's Pony" first airs.
- November 9: Garfield and Friends concludes its fourth season on CBS with the following episodes:
  - "The Pizza Patrol/The Son Also Rises/Rolling Romance"
  - "The Automated, Animated Adventure/It's a Wonderful Wade/Truckin' Odie"
- November 14: The Simpsons episode "Saturdays of Thunder" first airs.
- November 16: The infamous Super Mario World episode "Rock TV" broadcast, gaining much notoriety for its depictions of television addiction.
- November 21: The Simpsons episode "Flaming Moe's" first airs, guest starring the band Aerosmith.
- November 22:
  - The Walt Disney Company releases Beauty and the Beast.
  - Universal Pictures releases An American Tail: Fievel Goes West, a sequel to An American Tail. It became a cult film in the 2010s.
- November 30:
  - The first episode of Æon Flux airs.
  - The first episode of Liquid Television airs.

=== December ===
- December 5: The Simpsons episode "Burns Verkaufen der Kraftwerk" first airs.
- December 7:
  - The first episode of A Bunch of Munsch airs in Canada as a winter special. In the United States, the series premiered on December 17, 1991, an animated TV series based on the children's books by the American–Canadian children's author Robert Munsch. However, the series will later air regularly until the following year.
  - Super Mario World's final episode "Mama Luigi" airs, it was also the final episode of a Super Mario cartoon. While most of the series met negative attention at the time as its originality was grounded by the mandated Children's Television Act, this episode became a legacy following as it was one of the main sources for YTP's in the late 2000s. A remake was released on YouTube in 2017, dedicating the memories of Tony Rosato and Harvey Atkin.
- December 22: Rugrats concluded its first season on Nickelodeon with the premiere of the episodes "Graham Canyon/Stu Maker's Elves".
- December 26: The Simpsons episode "I Married Marge" first airs.

=== Specific date unknown ===
- The animation studio Dong Woo Animation is founded.
- Turner Broadcasting purchases animation studio Hanna-Barbera.

== Films released ==
- January 1 - The Adventures of the Magic Globe or Witch's Tricks (Soviet Union)
- January 18 - The Sensualist (Japan)
- January 25 - Vampire Wars (Japan)
- February 21 - Wizardry (Japan)
- February 22 - Psychic Wars (Japan)
- March 1 - To Want to Fly (Italy)
- March 9:
  - Doraemon: Nobita's Dorabian Nights (Japan)
  - Dragon Ball Z: Lord Slug (Japan)
  - Magical Taruruto (Japan)
  - Who's Left Behind? (Japan)
- March 12 - Okama Hakusho (Japan)
- March 16 - Mobile Suit Gundam F91 (Japan)
- March 21 - Burn Up! (Japan)
- April 5 - Capricorn (Japan)
- May 5 - Jang Dok-dae (South Korea)
- May 22 - Free! Whale Peek (Japan)
- May 25 - Robinson and Company (France)
- June 7 - Il Giornalino di Gian Burrasca (Italy)
- June 16 - Beyond the Tide of Time (Japan)
- June 21 - The Seventh Brother (Hungary, Germany, and United States)
- June 29 - Nadia of the Mysterious Seas (Japan)
- July 20:
  - The Adventures of Gamba and Otters (Japan)
  - Dragon Ball Z: Cooler's Revenge (Japan)
  - Magical Taruruto: Burn! Magic War of Friendship (Japan)
  - Only Yesterday (Japan)
  - Soreike! Anpanman Tobe! Tobe! Chibigon (Japan)
- July 21 - Urotsukidōji II: Legend of the Demon Womb (Japan)
- August 2 - Rover Dangerfield (United States)
- August 9 - Lupin III: Napoleon's Dictionary (Japan)
- August 16 - Huckleberry no Bōken (Japan)
- August 17 - Silent Möbius: The Motion Picture (Japan)
- August 18 - Urusei Yatsura: Always My Darling (Japan)
- September 6:
  - Darkwing Duck: Darkly Dawns the Duck (United States)
  - Hisaichi Ishii's Great Political World (Japan)
- September 11 - The Christmas Tree (United States and Brazil)
- September 14 - Roujin Z (Japan)
- September 19 - The Magic Riddle (Australia)
- October 11 - Sebastian Star Bear: First Mission (Netherlands)
- November 2 - Ranma ½: Big Trouble in Nekonron, China (Japan)
- November 21 - Christmas in January (Japan)
- November 22:
  - An American Tail: Fievel Goes West (United States and United Kingdom)
  - Beauty and the Beast (United States)
  - Ninja Ryūkenden (Japan)
- December 10 - Heukkkokdujanggun (South Korea)
- December 14:
  - Charlie Strapp and Froggy Ball Flying High (Sweden)
  - Gekkō no Pierce: Yumemi to Gin no Bara no Kishi-dan (Japan)
- December 19 - The Pirates of Dark Water: The Saga Begins (United States and Philippines)
- December 20 - The Princess and the Goblin (United States, United Kingdom, Hungary, and Japan)
- December 28 - Dark Cat (Japan)
- December 29 - The White Camel (Belgium, France, and Luxembourg)
- Specific date unknown:
  - Ali Baba (Australia)
  - The Count of Monte-Cristo (Australia)
  - The Emperor's New Clothes (Australia)
  - Eneida (Soviet Union and Ukraine)
  - Filemon i przyjaciele (Poland)
  - Frank Enstein (Australia)
  - Goldilocks and the Three Bears (Australia)
  - Hans and the Silver Skates (Australia)
  - The Holiday of the New Year Tree (Soviet Union)
  - The Legend of Zorro (Italy, Japan, and Switzerland)
  - Ness and Nessy (Latvia)
  - Robin Hood (Italy, Japan, and United Kingdom)
  - Underwater Berets (Soviet Union)
  - White Fang (Australia)

== Television series debuts ==
Date	Title	Channel	Year
February 25	The Pirates of Dark Water	ABC, Syndication	1991–1993
March 1	Toxic Crusaders	Syndication	1991
August 11	Doug	Nickelodeon	1991–1994
August 11	Rugrats	Nickelodeon	1991–1994, 1996–2004
August 11	The Ren & Stimpy Show	Nickelodeon, MTV	1991–1996
September 3	The Legend of Prince Valiant	The Family Channel	1991–1993
September 3	Little Dracula	Fox Kids	1991–1999
September 6	Victor & Hugo: Bunglers in Crime	ITV	1991–1992
September 7	Little Shop	Fox Kids	1991
September 7	Taz-Mania	Fox Kids	1991–1995
September 8	Darkwing Duck	The Disney Channel, Syndication, ABC	1991–1992
September 8	Bucky O'Hare and the Toad Wars	Syndication	1991
September 14	Super Mario World	NBC	1991
September 14	Wish Kid	NBC	1991
September 14	Space Cats	NBC	1991
September 14	Yo Yogi!	NBC	1991
September 14	ProStars	NBC	1991
September 14	Hammerman	ABC	1991
September 14	Mother Goose and Grim	CBS	1991–1992
September 14	Where's Wally?	CBS	1991
September 14	Back to the Future	CBS	1991–1992
September 15	Young Robin Hood	Syndication	1991–1992
September 16	James Bond Jr.	Syndication	1991–1992
September 26	Spider!	BBC1 (Children's BBC)	1991
September 28	Mr. Bogus	Syndication	1991–1993
November 30	Liquid Television	MTV	1991–1995
November 30	Æon Flux	MTV	1991–1995
December 7	A Bunch of Munsch	CTV, Showtime	1991–1992

== Television series endings ==
Date	Title	Channel	Year	Notes
January 18	Wake, Rattle, and Roll	Syndication	1990–1991	Cancelled
February 22	Disney's Adventures of the Gummi Bears	NBC, ABC, Syndication	1985–1991	Ended
May 11	Swamp Thing (1991)	Fox Kids	1990–1991	Cancelled
May 20	Toxic Crusaders	Syndication	1991	Cancelled
August 8	TaleSpin	The Disney Channel, Syndication	1990–1991	Cancelled
August 17	A Pup Named Scooby-Doo	ABC	1988–1991	Cancelled
September 10	Fox's Peter Pan & the Pirates	Fox Kids	1990–1991	Cancelled
October 5	The Real Ghostbusters	ABC, Syndication	1986–1991	Ended
October 26	Captain N: The Game Master	NBC	1989–1991	Cancelled
October 26	The New Adventures of Winnie the Pooh	The Disney Channel, ABC	1988–1991	Cancelled
November 2	Muppet Babies (1984)	CBS	1984–1991	Ended
November 16	Bill & Ted's Excellent Adventures	CBS, Fox Kids	1990–1991	Cancelled
November 23	Attack of the Killer Tomatoes	Fox Kids	1990–1991	Cancelled
November 30	Little Shop	Fox Kids	1991	Cancelled
December 1	Bucky O'Hare and the Toad Wars	Syndication	1991	Cancelled
December 6	Beetlejuice	ABC, Syndication	1989–1991	Cancelled
December 7	Hammerman	ABC	1991	Cancelled
December 7	Super Mario World	NBC	1991	Cancelled
December 7	Wish Kid	NBC	1991	Cancelled
December 7	Yo Yogi!	NBC	1991	Cancelled
December 7	ProStars	NBC	1991	Cancelled
December 8	The Adventures of Don Coyote and Sancho Panda	Syndication	1990–1991	Cancelled
December 14	Where's Wally?	CBS	1991	Cancelled
December 14	Space Cats	NBC	1991	Cancelled

== Births ==
=== January ===
- January 14: Jeanine Mason, American actress and dancer (voice of Christina Christo in the Megamind franchise, Eva in WondLa, Minuet Sonata in Trolls: TrollsTopia).
- January 18: Britt McKillip, Canadian actress and singer (voice of Princess Cadance in My Little Pony: Friendship is Magic, Lola Bunny in Baby Looney Tunes, Bingo Cherry in Coconut Fred's Fruit Salad Island, Goldilocks in Dragon Tales, Stella in ToddWorld, Harumi in Ninjago).
- January 25:
  - Ariana DeBose, American actress, dancer, and singer (voice of Asha in Wish, and Once Upon a Studio, Danielle in the Human Resources episode "Rutgers is for Lovers").
- January 28: Calum Worthy, Canadian actor, writer, and producer (voice of Taylor Travis in Pacific Rim: The Black, Teen Leader in the Wander Over Yonder episode "The Black Cube").

=== February ===
- February 10: Emma Roberts, American actress (voice of Wilma in The Flight Before Christmas, Wedgehead in UglyDolls, Amanda Barrington in the Family Guy episode "No Country Club for Old Men").

=== March ===
- March 5: Emi Lo, American voice actor (Funimation, Bang Zoom! Entertainment).
- March 6: Tyler, the Creator, American rapper and music producer (voice of Blitz Comet and Big Trouble in the Regular Show episode "Rap It Up", Black Jesus in Big Mouth, Broto in Black Dynamite, co-creator and executive producer of The Jellies!).
- March 9: Brenna O'Brien, Canadian actress and artist (voice of Rin in Inuyasha).
- March 26: Ramy Youssef, American stand-up comedian, actor, screenwriter, and director (voice of Safi in Wish).
- March 28: Amy Bruckner, American actress (voice of Haley Long in American Dragon: Jake Long).

=== April ===
- April 7: Anne-Marie, English singer-songwriter (voice of Lauren in Turning Red).
- April 10: AJ Michalka, American actress, musician and singer-songwriter (voice of Stevonnie in Steven Universe, Catra in She-Ra and the Princesses of Power).
- April 27: Darren Barnet, American actor (voice of Yuichi in Samurai Rabbit: The Usagi Chronicles, Mike in Skull Island, Taigen in Blue Eye Samurai).

=== May ===
- May 29: Saori Hayami, Japanese voice actress and singer (voice of Miyuki Shiba in The Irregular at Magic High School, Yukino Yukinoshita in My Youth Romantic Comedy Is Wrong, As I Expected, Leona in Dragon Quest: The Adventure of Dai, Himawari Uzumaki in Boruto: Naruto Next Generations, Shinobu Kochō in Demon Slayer: Kimetsu no Yaiba, Yor Forger in Spy × Family, Yumeko Jabami in Kakegurui – Compulsive Gambler).

=== June ===
- June 1: Zazie Beetz, German-American actress (voice of Diane Foxington in The Bad Guys franchise, Amber Bennett in Invincible).
- June 9: Abe Groening, American television writer and production assistant (Disenchantment).
- June 26: Natsuki Hanae, Japanese voice actor and YouTuber (voice of Tanjiro Kamado in Demon Slayer: Kimetsu no Yaiba, Ken Kaneki in Tokyo Ghoul, Inaho Kaizuka in Aldnoah.Zero, Takumi Aldini in Food Wars: Shokugeki no Soma, Kōsei Arima in Your Lie in April, Sieg in Fate/Apocrypha, Korai Hoshiumi in Haikyu!!, Vanitas in The Case Study of Vanitas, Haruichi Kominato in Ace of Diamond, Maki Katsuragi in Stars Align, The Duke of Death in The Duke of Death and His Maid).
- June 29:
  - Tajja Isen, Canadian writer, editor and voice actress (voice of Sister Bear in The Berenstain Bears, Jazzi in The Save-Ums!, the title character in Atomic Betty, Samantha in Franklin and the Turtle Lake Treasure, Jane in Jane and the Dragon, Jodie in Time Warp Trio, Princess Pea/Presto in Super Why!, Nessa in My Big Big Friend, singing voice of Franny in Franny's Feet).
  - Danielle Weisberg, American television writer and production assistant (The Simpsons).

=== July ===
- July 8: Thuso Mbedu, South African actress (voice of Annette in Castlevania: Nocturne).
- July 9: Mitchel Musso, American actor and singer (voice of Jeremy Johnson in Phineas and Ferb, D.J. in Monster House).
- July 12: Erik Per Sullivan, American former actor (voice of Sheldon in Finding Nemo, Mino and Baby Bug in Arthur and the Invisibles).
- July 26: Alice Isaaz, French actress (voice of Joan of Arc in Night at the Museum: Kahmunrah Rises Again).
- July 28: George Webster, English actor (voice of Winston in Unicorn: Warriors Eternal).

=== August ===
- August 13: Nikita Hopkins, American actor (voice of Roo in the Winnie the Pooh franchise, young Rudy Buenaventura in The Zeta Project episode "Kid Genius").
- August 14: Charlotte Nicdao, Australian actress (voice of Baby in Kuu Kuu Harajuku, Nurse and Checkout Lady in Bluey, Que in The Strange Chores, See-Thru Princess and Ancient Glass Princess in the Adventure Time: Distant Lands episode "Obsidian", Meredith in the Star Trek: Lower Decks episode "Room for Growth", Sam in the Zootopia+ episode "Dinner Rush", Princess Abigail in the Animaniacs episode "Royal Flush").
- August 28: Kyle Massey, American actor and rapper (voice of Huntsboy #88 in American Dragon: Jake Long, Milo in Fish Hooks, Mr. Spoony in Mighty Magiswords, Jeremy in Rise of the Teenage Mutant Ninja Turtles, Chad 3000 in the Yin Yang Yo! episode "Skirting the Issue").

=== September ===
- September 7: Jennifer Veal, English actress and internet personality (voice of Zhan Tiri in Rapunzel's Tangled Adventure, Ally in Descendants: Wicked World, Princess Magma in the Penn Zero: Part-Time Hero episode "Rockullan, Papyron, Scissorian").
- September 9: Adam Paloian, American animator (The SpongeBob Movie: Sponge Out of Water), character designer (Smiling Friends, The Cuphead Show!), storyboard artist (Pig Goat Banana Cricket, SpongeBob SquarePants, Tig n' Seek), writer and director (SpongeBob SquarePants, The Cuphead Show!).

=== October ===
- October 2: Antony Del Rio, American actor (voice of Reptil in The Super Hero Squad Show, Inferno in Avengers Assemble, Kel in Star Wars Resistance, Kyle in She-Ra and the Princesses of Power, Todd in Twelve Forever, Man-At-Arms in He-Man and the Masters of the Universe).
- October 7: Kody Kavitha, Indian-American actress (voice of Sunita in Rise of the Teenage Mutant Ninja Turtles, Samosa in Apple & Onion, Norma Khan in Dead End: Paranormal Park, Saanvi Patel in the We Bare Bears episode "Money Man").
- October 10: Vico Ortiz, Puerto Rican actor, drag king and activist, (voice of Tefe Holland in Harley Quinn, Hunter, Skater Y and Fern in Adventure Time: Fionna and Cake, Serena in Craig Before the Creek).
- October 18:
  - Ely Henry, Canadian-American actor (voice of Bamm-Bamm Rubble in Yabba Dabba Dinosaurs, Calculator in Justice League Action, Fleem in Smallfoot, Goodman in Blade Runner: Black Lotus, Edmund in Where's Waldo?, Bouncing Boy in Legion of Super-Heroes, Aristotle in Taz: Quest for Burger).
  - Tyler Posey, American actor (voice of Alonso in Elena of Avalor, Inferno in Marvel Rising, Tony Toretto in Fast & Furious: Spy Racers, Jose in the Shorty McShorts' Shorts episode "SheZow").

=== November ===
- November 1: Anthony Ramos, American actor and musician (voice of King Trollex in Trolls World Tour, Mr. Piranha in The Bad Guys, Tito in the Elena of Avalor episode "Team Isa").
- November 20: Lily Ki, American voice actress (voice of Miki in Welcome to Demon School! Iruma-kun, Yoshi in Don't Toy with Me, Miss Nagatoro, Lena in The Misfit of Demon King Academy, Love Cute in Mashle)

=== December ===
- December 17: Daniel Tay, American actor (voice of the title character in Doogal).
- December 19:
  - Libe Barer, American actress (voice of Violet Sabrewing in DuckTales, Casey Calderon in Moon Girl and Devil Dinosaur).
  - Sumire Uesaka, Japanese voice actress and singer (voice of Hayase Nagatoro in Don't Toy with Me, Miss Nagatoro).
- December 20:
  - Jason Szwimer, Canadian voice actor (voice of James in Arthur's Perfect Christmas, D.W. Read in seasons 7-10 of Arthur and Postcards from Buster, Elf in Caillou's Holiday Movie, Phil in The Tofus).
  - Jillian Rose Reed, American actress (voice of Naomi Turner in Elena of Avalor).
  - Sarah-Nicole Robles, American actress (voice of Judy in Billy Dilley's Super-Duper Subterranean Summer, Luz Noceda in The Owl House, Zuma in Kung Fu Panda: The Dragon Knight, Flytrap in Carmen Sandiego).
- December 26: Eden Sher, American actress (voice of Star Butterfly in Star vs. the Forces of Evil).
- December 31: ND Stevenson, American cartoonist and animation producer (She-Ra and the Princesses of Power, Nimona, Bravest Warriors, Disney Television Animation).

=== Specific date unknown ===
- Luis de la Rosa, Mexican animator (My Little Pony: The Movie, Night at the Museum: Kahmunrah Rises Again, Space Jam: A New Legacy, Spider-Man: Across the Spider-Verse, Carmen Sandiego, Cloudy with a Chance of Meatballs, Animaniacs), (d. 2026).

== Deaths ==
=== January ===
- January 12: Keye Luke, Chinese actor (voice of Brak in Space Ghost, Charlie Chan in The Amazing Chan and the Chan Clan, Zoltar and The Great Spirit in Battle of the Planets), dies at age 86.
- January 30: John McIntire, American actor (voice of Rufus in The Rescuers, Mr. Digger in The Fox and the Hound), dies at age 83.

=== February ===
- February 1: Jimmy MacDonald, Scottish-American animator, actor, musician and sound effects maker (Walt Disney Company, voice of Mickey Mouse from 1948 to 1977, original voice of Chip, Gus and Jaq in Cinderella, and Humphrey the Bear, the unlucky wolf in The Sword in the Stone), dies at age 84.
- February 2: Franco Latini, Italian voice actor (dub voice of Donald Duck and Tom Cat), dies at age 63.
- February 3: Nancy Kulp, American actress (voice of Frou-Frou in The Aristocats), dies at age 69.

=== March ===
- March 4: Vance Colvig, American clown and voice actor (voice of Chopper in The Yogi Bear Show), dies at age 72.
- March 14: Howard Ashman, American playwright and lyricist (Walt Disney Animation Studios), dies at age 40.
- March 26: Lechosław Marszałek, Polish film and television director (Reksio, worked on Bolek i Lolek, Studio Filmów Rysunkowych), dies at age 69.

=== April ===
- April 10: Natalie Schafer, American actress (voice of Lovey Howell in The New Adventures of Gilligan and Gilligan's Planet), dies at age 90.
- April 19: Frederik Bramming, Danish animator and comics artist (made advertising animated shorts for Bergenholz), dies at age 79.
- April 25: Carl Brandt, American musician (The Dick Tracy Show, The Famous Adventures of Mr. Magoo, Tom & Jerry), dies at age 76.
- April 28: Ken Curtis, American singer and actor (voice of Nutsy the vulture in Robin Hood), dies at age 74.
- April 30: Roy Seawright, American special effects maker and animator (Babes in Toyland, One Million B.C.), dies at age 85.

=== May ===
- May 14: Joy Batchelor, English animator, film producer and director (Halas & Batchelor, Animal Farm, the animated music video of Love Is All by Roger Glover), dies at age 77.

=== August ===
- August 4: Don DaGradi, American writer (Walt Disney Animation Studios), dies at age 80.

=== September ===
- September 3: Frank Capra, Italian-born American director, producer and writer (creator of Private Snafu, directed Our Mr. Sun and Hemo the Magnificent), dies at age 94.
- September 14: Lisa Michelson, American voice actress (English dub voice of Satsuki Kusakabe in My Neighbor Totoro and Kiki in Kiki's Delivery Service), dies in a car accident at age 33.
- September 24: Dr. Seuss, American children's novelist, illustrator, animator and comics artist (Warner Bros. Cartoons, How the Grinch Stole Christmas!), dies at age 87.
- September 27: Floyd Huddleston, American songwriter (The Aristocats, Robin Hood), dies at age 73.
- September 29: Ed Barge, American animator (Harman-Ising, MGM, Hanna-Barbera, Ralph Bakshi), dies at age 81.

=== October ===
- October 26: Henry Wilson Allen, aka Heck Allen, American novelist and animation writer (Barney Bear, worked for Tex Avery), dies at age 79.

=== November ===
- November 11: Morton Stevens, American composer (Tiny Toon Adventures), dies from pancreatic cancer at age 62.
- November 18: Reg Parlett, English cartoonist and comic book artist, (writer and artist for J. Arthur Rank's Animaland cartoons, one of the artists working on the animated film Animal Farm), dies at age 87.
- November 25: Eleanor Audley, American actress (voice of Lady Tremaine in Cinderella and Maleficent in Sleeping Beauty), dies at age 86.
- November 27: Harry Everett Smith, American experimental filmmaker (Early Abstractions, Heaven and Earth Magic), dies at age 68.

=== December ===
- December 29: Tony Strobl, American animator and comics artist (Walt Disney Company, scriptwriter for Duck Tales), dies at age 76.

=== Specific date unknown ===
- David Hamilton Grant, English pornographic producer and convicted criminal (Snow White and the Seven Perverts), dies at age 52 of an alleged contract killing.

== See also ==
- 1991 in anime
