= 1991 in anime =

The events of 1991 in anime.

== Accolades ==
- Animation Film Award: Roujin Z

== Releases ==
=== Film ===
A list of anime that debuted in theaters between January 1 and December 31, 1991.

Released	Title	Director	Studio	Runtime	Demographic	Ref
March 9	Doraemon: Nobita no Dorabian Naito (Doraemon: Nobita's Dorabian Nights)	Tsutomu Shibayama	Shin-Ei Animation	99 min	Shōnen	
March 9	Doragon Bōru Zetto: Sūpā Saiyajin da Son Gokū (Dragon Ball Z: Lord Slug)	Mitsuo Hashimoto	Toei Animation	52 min	Shōnen	
March 9	Magical Taruruto-kun	Shigeyasu Yamauchi	Toei Animation	51 min	Children	
March 9	Ushiro no Shoumen Daare (Who's Left Behind?)	Seiji Arihara	Mushi Production	90 min	Family	
March 16	Mobile Suit Gundam F91	Yoshiyuki Tomino	Sunrise	115 min	Shōnen	
May 22	Tobé! Kujira no Peek (Fly! Peek the Whale)	Kôji Morimoto	Urban Product	80 min	Family	
June 29	Fushigi no Umi no Nadia: Gekijōyō Original-ban (Nadia: The Secret of Blue Water – The Motion Picture)	Shō Aono	Gainax; Group TAC	87 min	Family	
July 20	Doragon Bōru Zetto: Tobikkiri no Saikyō tai Saikyō (Dragon Ball Z: Cooler's Revenge)	Mitsuo Hashimoto	Toei Animation	47 min	Shōnen	
July 20	Doragon Kuesuto: Dai no Daibouken (Dragon Quest: The Adventures of Dai)	Nobutaka Nishizawa	Toei Animation	31 min	Shōnen	
July 20	Gamba to Kawauso no Bouken (The Adventures of Gamba and Otters)	Shunji Ōga	Tokyo Movie Shinsha	80 min	Children	
July 20	Hello Kitty no Mahō no Mori no Ohime-sama (Hello Kitty's Princess of the Magic Forest)	Norio Kashima	Sanrio; Grouper Productions; Aubec	30 min	Children	
July 20	Kero Kero Keroppi no Sanjūshi (Kero Kero Keroppi's Three Musketeers)	Masami Hata	Sanrio; Grouper Productions	62 min	Children	
July 20	Majikaru Tarurūto-kun: Moero! Yuujou no Mahou Taisen (Magical Taruruto-kun: Burn! Magic War of Friendship)	Hiroyuki Kakudou	Toei Animation	41 min	Shōnen	
July 20	Omoide Poro Poro (Only Yesterday)	Isao Takahata	Studio Ghibli	118 min		
July 20	Soreike! Anpanman: Tobe! Tobe! Chibigon (Let's Go! Anpanman: Fly! Fly! Chibigon)	Akinori Nagaoka	Tokyo Movie Shinsha	40 min	Children	
July 20	Taibo no Ryugu Star Adventure (Taibo's Ryugu Star Adventure)	Mikasa Mutsuki	Sanrio; Grouper Productions	30 min	Children	
August 17	Silent Möbius: The Motion Picture	Kazuo Tomizawa	AIC	54 min	Shōnen	
August 18	Urusei Yatsura: Itsudatte Mai Dārin (Urusei Yatsura: Always My Darling)	Katsuhisa Yamada	Madhouse	77 min	Shōnen	
September 14	Roujin Z	Hiroyuki Kitakubo	A.P.P.P.	84 min		
November 2	Ranma Nibunnoichi: Chūgoku Nekonron Daikessen! Okite Yaburi no Gekitō Hen! (Ranma ½: Big Trouble in Nekonron, China)	Shuji Iuchi	Studio Deen	77 min	Shōnen	

=== TV series ===
A list of anime television series that debuted between January 1 and December 31, 1991.

Released	Title	Episodes	Director	Studio	Ref
January 13 – December 28	Trapp Ikka Monotatari	40	Kouzou Kusuba	Fuji TV	
February 2–1, 1992	Taiyou no Yuusha Fighbird	48	Katsuyoshi Yatabe	Nagoya Broadcasting Network	
February 11 – January 27, 1992	Getter Robo Go	50	Hiroki Shibata	Toei Animation	
March 15 – December 20	Future GPX Cyber Formula	37	Mitsuo Fukuda	Sunrise	
April 3 – March 25, 1992	Zettai Muteki Raijin-Oh	51	Toshifumi Kawase	Sunrise	
April 8 – December 23	Kikou Keisatsu Metal Jack	37	Kiyoshi Egami	Sunrise	
April 12 – March 13, 1992	High School Mystery: Gakuen Nanafushigi	41	Shin Misawa	Studio Comet	
April 28 – October 10	City Hunter '91	13	Kiyoshi Egami	Sunrise	
July 14 – May 31, 1992	Dear Brother	39	Osamu Dezaki	Tezuka Productions	
October 2 – December 23, 1992	Mahou no Princess Minky Momo: Yume wo Dakishimete	65	Kunihiko Yuyama	Ashi Productions	
October 4 – September 25, 1992	Genji Tsūshin Agedama	51	Masato Namiki	Studio Gallop	
October 6 – September 27, 1992	Kinnikuman: Kinnikusei Oui Soudatsu-hen	46	Takeshi Shirato Atsutoshi Umezawa	Toei Animation	
October 10 – September 24, 1992	Moero! Top Striker	49	Ryō Yasumura	Nippon Animation	
October 17 – September 24, 1992	Dragon Quest: Dai no Daibouken	46	Nobutaka Nishizawa	Toei Animation	
October 18 – September 25, 1992	Yokoyama Mitsuteru Sangokushi	47	Seiji Okuda	Dai Nippon Printing	

=== OVA releases ===
A list of original video animations that debuted between January 1 and December 31, 1991.

Released	Title	Episodes	Director	Studio	Ref
January 23	Legend of the Phantom Heroes (Phantom Yūsha Densetsu)	1	Tetsu Dezaki	Magic Bus	
January 25	Vampire Wars (Vanpaiyā Sensō)	1	Kazuhisa Takenouchi	Toei Animation	
February 6 – July 17, 1992	Shakotan★Boogie	4	By episode: Hirotaka Kinoshita (1–2); Shinichi Tokairin (3–4)	Studio Pierrot	
February 21	Wizardry	1	Toshiya Shinohara	Tokyo Movie Shinsha	
February 22	Psychic Wars (Sojuu Senshi – Saikikku Wōzu)	1	Tetsuo Imazawa	Toei Animation	
February 22	Samuraider: Nazo no Tenkousei (Samuraider: The Mysterious Transfer Student)	1	Hideaki Oba	MTV	
March 8	The New Star of the Fallen Mud: Legend of the Incubus (Shin David no Hoshi: Inma Densetsu)	1	Yōichirō Shimatani	Studio Junio	
March 21	Burn Up!	1	Yasunori Ide	AIC	
April 3	Dr. Typhoon	1	Eiji Kazama; Michitsuna Takahashi		
April 5	Capricorn	1	Takashi Imanishi	Aubec	
April 12 – February 6, 1992	Okama Report	3	Hideo Yamamoto		
April 12	Shizukanaru Don – Yakuza Side Story	1	Tatsuo Nitta	Tokyo Movie Shinsha	
April 21 – July 21	Sukeban Deka	2	Hirota Takeshi	SIDO Limited	
April 21	Sweet Spot	1	Hideaki Oba	Group TAC	
May 21	Honoo no Tenkousei	2	Katsuhiko Nishijima	Gainax	
May 21	Maison Ikkoku: Bangai-hen - Ikkokujima Nanpa Shimatsuki	1	Setsuko Shibuichi	Magic Bus	
May 21 – November 21	Abashiri Ikka	4	Takashi Watanabe	Studio Pierrot; Tokyo Kids	
May 21 – November 21	Akai Hayate	4	Osamu Tsuruyama	Studio Pierrot	
May 21 – November 21	Eguchi Hisashi no Kotobuki Goro Show	4	By episode: Masakatsu Iijima (1-3); Osamu Nabeshima (4)	Studio Pierrot; Kyoto Animation	
May 21 – November 21	Yumemakura Baku Twilight Gekijō	4	By episode: Saeko Aoki (1-2); Shinya Ohira (3); Shinji Hashimoto (4)	Studio Pierrot; D.A.S.T Corporation	
May 23 – September 24, 1992	Mobile Suit Gundam 0083: Stardust Memory	13	Mitsuko Kase (1–7) Takashi Imanishi (8–13)	Sunrise	
May 25 – December 21	Bubblegum Crash	3	By episode: Hiroshi Ishiodori (1–3); Hiroyuki Fukushima (2)	Artmic	
June 1–21, 1992	RG Veda	2	By episode: Hiroyuki Ebata (1); Takamasa Ikegami (2)	By episode: Usagi Ya (1); Studio Signal (2)	
June 1 – November 1	Slow Step	5	Kunihiko Yuyama	Youmex	
June 15	Yami no Shihosha Judge	1	Hiroshi Negishi	Animate Film; J.C.Staff	
June 25 – March 10, 1993	Souryuuden	12	Osamu Dezaki	Kitty Film Mitaka Studio	
June 27	The Gakuen Chōjo-tai (The Academy Supergirl Team)	1	Tetsu Dezaki	Magic Bus	
July 9	Shiawasette Naani (What is Happiness?)	1	Tatsuya Ishihara	Kyoto Animation; Gakken	
July 21 – September 21	Kyofu Shinbun	2	Takashi Anno	Studio Pierrot	
July 25 – March 19, 1992	3×3 Eyes	4	Daisuke Nishio	Toei Animation	
July 25 – October 21	ASaTTe DaNCE (Dance Till Tomorrow)	1	By episode: Teruo Kogure (1); Masamune Ochiai (2)	Knack Productions	
July 25	Hoshikuzu Paradise (Stardust Paradise)	1	Masato Namiki	Pastel; OB Planning	
July 25 – December 14	Yukan Club	2	Setsuko Shibuichi	Madhouse	
August 1 – March 1, 1992	Kekkou Kamen	4	By episode: Nobuhiro Kondo (1); Shunichi Tokunaga (2); Kinji Yoshimoto (3–4)	Studio Signal	
August 16	Ningyo no Mori (Mermaid's Forest)	1	Takaya Mizutani	Studio Pierrot; Victor Entertainment	
August 17 – September 21, 1995	Arslan Senki (The Heroic Legend of Arslan)	6	Kazuchika Kise (chief director) By episode: Mamoru Hamatsu (1, 5–6); Yoshihiro Yamaguchi (2); Tetsurō Amino (3–4)	By episode: I.G Tatsunoko (1); Aubec (2); Pierrot; Daume (3–4); J.C.Staff (5–6)	
August 21 – October 21	Ushiro no Hyakutarō	2	Seitarô Hara By episode: Isao Shizuya (1); Masaaki Sakurai (2)	Studio Pierrot	
August 21 – October 23	Locke the Superman: New World Command (Chōjin Rokku: Shin Sekai Sentai)	2	Takeshi Hirota	Nippon Animation	
August 25 – April 25, 1992	Detonator Orgun	3	Masami Oobari	AIC; Artmic	
August 25 – March 25, 1992	Yokohama Meibutsu Otoko Katayama Gumi!	2	Yoshinori Nakamura	J.C.Staff	
August 28	Mahjong Hishō-den - Naki no Ryū: Hiryū no Shō	1	Junichi Nojo (original creator)	Gainax; Magic Bus	
August 30	Licca-chan: Fushigi na Maho no Ring (Licca: The Mysterious Magical Ring)	2	Fumiko Ishii	Ajia-do Animation Works	
September 1	Meisō-Ō Border	1	Akio Tanaka (art); Caribu Marley (story)	Nippon Animation; Artland	
September 6	Ishii Hisaichi no Daiseikai (Hisaichi Ishii's Great Political World)	1	Masayuki Oozeki	E&G Films	
September 16 – March 16, 1992	Legend of Heavenly Sphere Shurato: Dark Genesis (Tenkū Senki Shurato: Sōsei e no Antō)	6	Yoshihisa Matsumoto	Tatsunoko Production	
September 21	Money Wars - Nerawareta Waterfront Keikaku	1	Yoriyasu Kogawa	Gainax	
September 27 – December 20	Otaku no Video	2	Takeshi Mori	Gainax	
September 27	Doomed Megalopolis (Teito Monogatari)	4	Rintaro (chief director) By episode: Kazuyoshi Katayama (1); Koichi Chigira (2); Kazunari Kume (3); Masashi Ikeda (4)	Madhouse	
September 27	Exper Zenon	1	Yuji Moriyama	Studio Fantasia	
September 27 – December 20	Ozanari Dungeon: The Tower of Wind (Ozanari Danjon: Kaze no Tō)	3	Hiroshi Aoyama	Telecom Animation Film	
September 21 – October 21	Izumo	2	Eiichi Yamamoto	Studio Hibari; Grouper Productions	
October 21 – May 21, 1992	Ore no Sora: Keiji-Hen	2	Takeshi Shirato	A.P.P.P.	
October 21 – January 21, 1992	Tomoe ga Yuku! (Tomoe's Run!)	2	Takaaki Ishiyama	Animate Film	
October 24 – August 21, 1992	Kyoushoku Soukou Guyver II	6	Naoto Hashimoto	Visual 80	
October 24	Kyūkyoku Chōjin R	1	Masami Yuki	Studio COA	
October 25	Ucchare Goshogawara	1	Kazuhiro Ozawa	J.C.Staff	
November 1 – December 20	Chō Bakumatsu Shōnen Seiki Takamaru	2	Toyoo Ashida	J.C.Staff; Studio Live	
November 8	Tsuki ga Noboru made ni (By the Time the Moon Rises)	1	Eiichi Yamamoto	Grouper Productions; OB Planning	
November 21	Christmas in January	1	Tetsu Dezaki	Magic Bus	
November 22	Ninja Ryūkenden (Ninja Garden)	1	Mamoru Kanbe	Studio Junio	
November 27 – March 26, 1993	Koko wa Green Wood (Here Is Greenwood)	6	Tomomi Mochizuki	Ajia-do Animation Works; Studio Pierrot	
November 28	Dark Cat	1	Iku Suzuki	Agent 21	
December 1 – February 26, 1992	Gall Force: New Era	2	Katsuhito Akiyama	By episode: AIC (1); Studio Kyūma (2)	
December 1	Otohime Connection (Princess Sister Connection)	1	Takayuki Goto	Animate Film	
December 4 – April 8, 1992	Jingi	2	By episode: Kiyoshi Murayama (1–2); Kenjirō Yoshida (1)	Nihon Eizō; J.C. Staff	
December 5 – 25	Nyūin Bokki Monogatari Odaiji ni!	2	Yoshitaka Koyama	Barque Inc.; Tokyo Kids; Animaruya	
December 13	Monkey Punch no Sekai: Alice	1	Kazunori Tanahashi; Yuzo Aoki	Takahashi Studio	
December 13	Neko Neko Fantasia	1	Akira Nishimori	AIC; Animate Film	
December 14	Gekkō no Pierce: Yumemi to Gin no Bara no Kishi-dan (Moonlight Earrings: Yumemi and the Silver Rose Knights)	1	Takeshi Mori	Studio Pierrot	

== See also ==
- 1991 in animation
