= List of animated television series of 1991 =

This is a list of animated television series first aired in 1991.

Animated television series first aired in 1991
Title	Seasons	Episodes	Country	Year	Original Channel	Technique
10+2	1	52	Spain	1991–2004	Televisió de Catalunya	Traditional
The Adventures of Tintin	3	39	Canada, France	1991–92	FR3/France 3 Global Television Network	Traditional
Æon Flux	3	21	Japan, United States	1991–95	MTV	Traditional
Les Aventures de la Famille Glady	1	26	France	1991	TF1	Traditional
Back to the Future	2	26	France, United States	1991–92	CBS; France 2	Traditional
Le Bonheur de la vie	1	20	France	1991	FR3	Traditional
Bonjour les bébés!	1	100	France	1991	FR3	Traditional
Britannica's Tales Around the World	1	6	United States	1991–93	Direct-to-video	Traditional
Bucky O'Hare and the Toad Wars!	1	13	France, United States	1991	Syndication	Traditional
A Bunch of Munsch	1	7	Canada; United States	1991–92	CTV; Showtime	Traditional
Captain Zed and the Zee Zone	2	26	United Kingdom; United States	1991–93	ITV Network	Traditional
La Compète	1	26	France	1991	Antenne 2	Traditional
Cupido	1	24	France	1991	Antenne 2	Traditional
Darkwing Duck	3	91	United States	1991–92	Syndication; ABC	Traditional
Dinky Di's	1	26	Australia	1991	Nine Network	Traditional
Doug	7	117	United States; France (seasons 1–4)	1991–99	Nickelodeon (1991–94); ABC (1996–99)	Traditional
Hammerman	1	13	United States; Canada; Italy	1991–92	ABC	Traditional
James Bond Jr.	1	65	United States	1991	Syndication	Traditional
Jurošík	1	50	Czechoslovakia; Slovakia	1991–2011		Traditional
The Legend of Prince Valiant	2	65	United States; Germany; France	1991–93	The Family Channel	Traditional
Liquid Television	4	27	United States	1991–95	MTV	Traditional
Little Dracula	1	13	United States	1991–99	Fox Kids Network; M6	Traditional
Little Shop	1	13	United States; France	1991	Fox Kids Network; La Cinq	Traditional
Lucky Luke (1991)	1	26	Belgium	1991–92	FR3	Traditional
Michel Vaillant	1	65	France; United States	1991	Canal J	Traditional
Mother Goose and Grimm	2	26	United States	1991–92	CBS	Traditional
Mr. Bogus	3	43	United States	1991–93	Syndication	Traditional
The Nudnik Show	1	13	Czechoslovakia	1991	Cartoon Network	Traditional
Once Upon a Time... The Americas	1	26	France	1991	Canal+	Traditional
The Pirates of Dark Water	2	21	United States	1991–93	Fox Kids Network; ABC; Syndication	Traditional
ProStars	1	13	United States; Italy	1991	NBC	Traditional
The Ren & Stimpy Show	5	52	United States	1991–96	Nickelodeon (1991–95); MTV (1996)	Traditional
The Return of Dogtanian	1	26	Spain; United Kingdom	1991	TVE1	Traditional
Rod 'n' Emu	1	13	United Kingdom	1991	ITV	Traditional
Roger Mellie: The Man on the Telly	1	4	United Kingdom	1991	Channel 4	Traditional
Rugrats (1991)	9	172	United States	1991–2004	Nickelodeon	Traditional
Rupert	5	65	Canada; France (seasons 1–3)	1991–97	YTV; ITV; France 3 (seasons 1–3)	Traditional
Soupe Opéra	2	26	France	1991–2000	France 3	Stop Motion
Space Cats	1	13	United States	1991–92	NBC	Traditional
Spider!	1	13	United Kingdom	1991	BBC1	Traditional
Super Mario World	1	13	United States; Canada; Italy	1991	NBC	Traditional
Tata Colores	1	16	Chile	1991–95	TVN	Stop Motion/Cut Out
Taz-Mania	4	65	United States	1991–95	Fox Kids Network	Traditional
Toxic Crusaders	1	13	United States	1991	YTV; Syndication	Traditional
The Twins of Destiny	1	52	France; China; United States; United Kingdom	1991	TF1	Traditional
Victor & Hugo: Bunglers in Crime	2	30	United Kingdom	1991–92	ITV	Traditional
Where's Wally?	1	13	United States; United Kingdom	1991	CBS; ITV	Traditional
Wish Kid	1	13	United States; Italy	1991	NBC	Traditional
Yo Yogi!	1	13	United States	1991	NBC	Traditional
Young Robin Hood	2	26	United States; Canada; France	1991	Syndication	Traditional

Anime television series first aired in 1991

Title	Seasons	Episodes	Country	Year	Original Channel	Technique
21 Emon	1	39	Japan	1991–92	TV Asahi	Traditional
Anime Himitsu no Hanazono	1	39	Japan	1991–92	NHK	Traditional
Armored Police Metal Jack	1	37	Japan	1991	TV Tokyo	Traditional
The Brave of Sun Fighbird	1	48	Japan	1991–92	Nagoya TV	Traditional
Chiisana Obake Acchi, Kocchi, Socchi	1	50	Japan	1991–92	Nippon TV	Traditional
City Hunter '91	1	13	Japan	1991	Nippon TV	Traditional
Dear Brother	1	39	Japan	1991–92	NHK BS-2	Traditional
Delightful Moomin Family: Adventure Diary	1	26	Japan	1991–92	TV Tokyo	Traditional
Dororonpa!	1	115	Japan	1991	TV Asahi	Traditional
Dragon Quest: The Adventure of Dai	1	46	Japan	1991–92	TBS	Traditional
Future GPX Cyber Formula	1	37	Japan	1991	Nippon TV	Traditional
Genji Tsūshin Agedama	1	51	Japan	1991–92	TV Tokyo	Traditional
Getter Robo Go	1	50	Japan	1991–92	TX Network	Traditional
Goldfish Warning!	1	54	Japan	1991–92	TV Asahi	Traditional
High School Mystery: Gakuen Nanafushigi	1	41	Japan	1991–92	Fuji TV	Traditional
Holly the Ghost	1	200	Japan	1991–93	NHK	Traditional
Honō no Tōkyūji: Dodge Danpei	1	47	Japan	1991–92	TV Tokyo	Traditional
Jankenman	1	51	Japan	1991–92	TV Tokyo	Traditional
Jarinko Chie 2	1	39	Japan	1991–92	MBS	Traditional
Kinkyū Hasshin Saver Kids	1	50	Japan	1991–92	TV Tokyo	Traditional
Kinnikuman: Kinniku-sei Ōi Sōdatsu-hen	1	46	Japan	1991–92	Nippon TV	Traditional
Magical Princess Minky Momo: Hold on to Your Dreams	1	65	Japan	1991–92	Nippon TV	Traditional
Marude Dameo	1	47	Japan	1991–92	Fuji TV	Traditional
Matchless Raijin-Oh	1	51	Japan	1991–92	TV Tokyo	Traditional
Mischievous Twins: The Tales of St. Clare's	1	26	Japan	1991	Nippon TV	Traditional
Moero! Top Striker	1	49	Japan	1991–92	TV Tokyo	Traditional
Reporter Blues	1	52	Italy, Japan	1991	NHK BS-2	Traditional
Saban's Adventures of the Little Mermaid	1	26	France, Japan	1991	Fuji TV	Traditional
Shōnen Ashibe	1	37	Japan	1991	TBS	Traditional
Trapp Family Story	1	40	Japan	1991	Fuji TV	Traditional
Yokoyama Mitsuteru Sangokushi	1	47	Japan	1991–92	TV Tokyo	Traditional

== See also ==
- List of animated feature films of 1991
- List of Japanese animation television series of 1991
