= List of animated feature films of 1991 =

This is a list of animated feature films first released in 1991.

== List ==
| Title | Country | Director | Production company | Animation technique | Format | Notes | Release date | Duration |
|---|---|---|---|---|---|---|---|---|
| The Adventures of Gamba and Otters ガンバとカワウソの冒険 (Gamba to Kawauso no Bouken) | Japan | Shunji Ōga | Tokyo Movie Shinsha | Traditional | Theatrical | ? | July 20, 1991 | 80 minutes |
| The Adventures of the Magic Globe or Witch's Tricks; Приключения волшебного глобуса, или проделки ведьмы (Priklyucheniya volshebnogo globusa, ili prodelki vedmy) | Soviet Union | Ivan Axenchuk | Soyuzmultfilm | Traditional | Theatrical | ? | January 1, 1991 | 65 minutes |
| Ali Baba | Australia | Douglas Richards; Richard Slapczynski | Burbank Animation Studios | Traditional | Television film | ? | ? | 50 minutes |
| An American Tail: Fievel Goes West | United States; United Kingdom | Phil Nibbelink; Simon Wells | Universal Pictures; Amblin Entertainment; Amblimation | Traditional | Theatrical | Sequel to An American Tail (1986), and the inaugural production from Steven Spielberg's Amblimation. | November 22, 1991 | 75 minutes |
| Go! Anpanman: Fly! Fly! Chibigon ja:それいけ!アンパンマン とべ! とべ! ちびごん | Japan | Akinori Nagaoka | Anpanman Production Committee, TMS Entertainment | Traditional | Theatrical | | July 20, 1991 | 50 minutes |
| Beauty and the Beast | United States | Gary Trousdale; Kirk Wise | Walt Disney Feature Animation | Traditional | Theatrical | The first animated film to be nominated for an Academy Award for Best Picture. | November 22, 1991 | 84 minutes |
| Beyond the Tide of Time 満ちてくる時のむこうに (Michite Kuru Toki no Mukō ni) | Japan | Hisayuki Toriumi | Yomiko Advertising; Pierrot; Nippon TV | Traditional | Television film | ? | June 16, 1991 | 76 minutes |
| Brer Rabbit Tales | Ireland | Al Guest; Jean Mathieson | Emerald City Productions | Traditional | Television special | | July 31, 1991 | 47 minutes |
| Burn Up! バーンナップ (Bān'nappu) | Japan | Yasunori Ide | AIC | Traditional | Direct-to-video; OVA | | March 21, 1991 | 50 minutes |
| Capricorn カプリコン | Japan | Takashi Imanishi | Aubec; Anime R Atelier Fukuro; D.A.S.T Corporation; Studio Mu; Continental Shobo; King Records | Traditional | Direct-to-video; OVA | | April 5, 1991 | 45 minutes |
| Christmas in January; 1月にはChristmas | Japan | Tetsu Dezaki | For Life Records; Magic Bus; Media Rings Corporation | Traditional | Direct-to-video; OVA | | November 21, 1991 | 50 minutes |
| Charlie Strapp and Froggy Ball Flying High a. k. a. The Adventures of Kalle Stropp and the Frog Ball; Kalle Stropp och Grodan Boll på svindlande äventyr | Sweden | Jan Gissberg | | Traditional | Theatrical | | December 14, 1991 | 83 minutes |
| The Count of Monte-Cristo | Australia | | Burbank Animation Studios | Traditional | Television film | | ? | 50 minutes |
| Coyote Tales | United States | Robert Heath | Walt Disney Productions (archive footage); Robert Heath Inc. Walt Disney Television | Traditional | Television special Compilation film | Compilation of animal-based Disney theatrical animated shorts; retread adaptation of The Coyote's Lament from Disneyland, with extended content and more cartoons. | March 24, 1991 | 79 minutes |
| Dark Cat ダークキャット (Daku Kyatto) | Japan | Iku Suzuki | Agent 21; Nikkatsu Corporation; E&G Films | Traditional | Direct-to-video; OVA | | December 28, 1991 | 60 minutes |
| Darkwing Duck: Darkly Dawns the Duck | United States | Tad Stones | Walt Disney Television; Walt Disney Television Animation; Buena Vista Television (distributor) | Traditional | Television film | Pilot of the Disney television series Darkwing Duck (1991–1992). | September 6, 1991 | 46 minutes |
| Doraemon: Nobita's Dorabian Nights ドラえもん のび太のドラビアンナイト (Doraemon: Nobita no Dorabian Naito) | Japan | Tsutomu Shibayama | Asatsu; Shin-Ei Animation; Toho (distributor) | Traditional | Theatrical | | March 9, 1991 | 99 minutes |
| Dr. Typhoon; Dr.(ドク)タイフーン (Dokutā Taifu) | Japan | Junji Nishimura | | Traditional | Direct-to-video; OVA | | April 3, 1991 | 46 minutes |
| Dragon Ball Z: Cooler's Revenge ドラゴンボールZ とびっきりの最強対最強 (Doragon Bōru Zetto: Tobikkiri no Saikyō tai Saikyō) | Japan | Mitsuo Hashimoto | Toei Animation | Traditional | Theatrical | | July 20, 1991 | 47 minutes |
| Dragon Ball Z: Lord Slug ドラゴンボールZ 超サイヤ人だ孫悟空 (Doragon Bōru Zetto Sūpā Saiyajin da Son Gokū) | Japan | Mitsuo Hashimoto | Toei Animation | Traditional | Theatrical | | March 9, 1991 | 52 minutes |
| The Emperor's New Clothes | Australia | Richard Slapczynski | Burbank Animation Studios | Traditional | Television film | | ? | 50 minutes |
| Eneida; Енеїда (Eneyida) | Soviet Union; Ukraine | Vladimir Dakhno | Kievnauchfilm; Ukrainimafilm | Traditional | Theatrical | Possibly the first Ukrainian animated feature. | ? | 69 minutes |
| Exper Zenon エクスパーゼノン | Japan | Yuji Moriyama | Studio Fantasia; Nippon Victor | Traditional | Direct-to-video; OVA | | September 27, 1991 | 60 minutes |
| Filemon i przyjaciele | Poland | Ireneusz Czesny; Ryszard Szymczak | Se-ma-for | Traditional | Theatrical; Compilation film | | ? | 60 minutes |
| Frank Enstein | Australia | | Burbank Animation Studios | Traditional | Television film | | ? | 50 minutes |
| Free! Whale Peek とべ! くじらのピーク (Tobé! Kujira no Peek) | Japan | Kôji Morimoto | Toho Company; Urban Product | Traditional | Theatrical | | May 22, 1991 | 80 minutes |
| The Gakuen Chōjo-tai ザ・学園超女隊 (The Academy Supergirl Team) | Japan | Tetsu Dezaki | Magic Bus; Bandai Visual (distributor) | Traditional | Direct-to-video; OVA | | June 27, 1991 | 45 minutes |
| Gekkō no Pierce: Yumemi to Gin no Bara no Kishi-dan 月光のピアス ユメミと銀のバラ騎士団 (Moonlight Earrings: Yumemi and the Silver Rose Knights) | Japan | Takeshi Mori | Toho (distributor); Pierrot; Shueisha | Traditional | Direct-to-video; OVA | | December 14, 1991 | 70 minutes |
| Il Giornalino di Gian Burrasca | Italy | Stelio Passacantando | Studio Passacantando | Traditional | Theatrical | | June 7, 1991 | 81 minutes |
| Goldilocks and the Three Bears | Australia | | Burbank Animation Studios | Traditional | Television film | | ? | 49 minutes |
| Hans and the Silver Skates | Australia | | Burbank Animation Studios | Traditional | Television film | | ? | 50 minutes |
| Heukkkokdujanggun 흙꼭두장군 (Mud Kokdu General) | South Korea | Kim Seong-chil | K-Land Productions | Traditional | Television film | | December 10, 1991 | 90 minutes |
| Hisaichi Ishii's Great Political World いしいひさいちの大政界 (Ishii Hisaichi no Daiseikai) | Japan | Masayuki Oozeki | E&G Films | Traditional | Direct-to-video; OVA | | September 6, 1991 | 50 minutes |
| The Holiday of the New Year Tree; Праздник новогодней ёлки (Prazdnik novogodney yolki) | Soviet Union | Mstislav Pashchenko; Witold Bordzilovsky; Pyotr Nosov; Leonid Amalrik | Soyuzmultfilm | Traditional | ? | Collection of New Year's animated films of Soyuzmultfilm studio of different years. | ? | 65 minutes |
| Huckleberry no Bōken ハックルベリィの冒険 (The Adventures of Huckleberry) | Japan | Hiroyoshi Mitsunobu; Tameo Kohanawa | Pony Canyon; Group TAC | Traditional | Theatrical | Film compiled from TV series episodes | August 16, 1991 | 86 minutes |
| Jang Dok-dae 장독대 (Jangdokdae) | South Korea | Bae Yeong-rang | MBC; Dongyang Donghwa | Traditional | Television film | | May 5, 1991 | 90 minutes |
| Kero Kero Keroppi's Three Musketeers けろけろけろっぴの三銃士, (Kero Kero Keroppi no Sanjūshi) | Japan | Masami Hata | Sanrio; Grouper Productions; Toho (distributor) | Traditional | Theatrical | The second of only two feature-length installments in the Sanrio World Masterpiece Theater series; based on The Three Musketeers. | July 20, 1991 | 62 minutes |
| Kyūkyoku Chōjin R 究極超人あ〜る (Kyūkyoku Chōjin Āru) | Japan | Ami Tomobuki | Studio COA; Bandai Visual; Media Rings Corporation; Shogakukan-Shueisha Productions | Traditional | Direct-to-video; OVA | | October 24, 1991 | 74 minutes |
| Legend of the Phantom Heroes 忍者龍剣新堕糜泥の星 淫魔伝説 (Phantom Yūsha Densetsu) | Japan | Tetsu Dezaki | Bandai Visual (distributor); Magic Bus; Taki Corporation | Traditional | Direct-to-video; OVA | | January 23, 1991 | 45 minutes |
| Lifestyles of the Rich and Animated | United States | Kenny Wolin | Walt Disney Productions (archive footage); Robert Heath Inc. Walt Disney Television | Traditional | Television special Compilation film | Compilation of lifestyle-based Disney theatrical animated shorts; Corey Burton provided new redubbed lines for Ludwig von Drake in the special. | August 18, 1991 | 90 minutes |
| The Little Engine That Could | United States | Dave Edwards | S4C; Kalato Animation; Dave Edwards Studio | Traditional | Direct-to-video | | November 22, 1991 | 30 minutes |
| Lupin III: Napoleon's Dictionary ルパン三世『ナポレオンの辞書を奪え』 (Rupan Sansei: Napoleon no Jisho o Ubae) | Japan | Osamu Dezaki | Tokyo Movie Shinsha; Nippon TV | Traditional | Television special | | August 9, 1991 | 90 minutes |
| The Magic Riddle | Australia | Yoram Gross | Yoram Gross Films | Traditional | Theatrical | | September 19, 1991 | 93 minutes |
| Magical Taruruto-kun まじかる☆タルるートくん (Majikaru Tarurūto-kun) | Japan | Shigeyasu Yamauchi | Toei Animation | Traditional | Theatrical | | March 9, 1991 | 51 minutes |
| Magical Taruruto-kun: Burn! Magic War of Friendship まじかる☆タルるートくん 燃えろ! 友情の魔法大戦 (Majikaru Tarurūto-kun: Moero! Yuujou no Mahou Taisen) | Japan | Hiroyuki Kakudou | Toei Animation | Traditional | Theatrical | | July 20, 1991 | 45 minutes |
| Meisō-Ō Border 迷走王ボーダー 社会復帰編 (Stray King Border: Return to Society) | Japan | Noboru Ishiguro | Nippon Animation; Artland | Traditional | Direct-to-video; OVA | | September 1, 1991 | 44 minutes |
| Mermaid's Forest 人魚の森 (Ningyo no Mori) | Japan | Takaya Mizutani | OB Planning Co., Ltd. Pastel; Shogakukan-Shueisha Productions | Traditional | Direct-to-video; OVA | | August 16, 1991 | 56 minutes |
| Mobile Suit Gundam F91 機動戦士ガンダムF91 (Kidō Senshi Gandamu Fōmyura Nainti Wan) | Japan | Yoshiyuki Tomino | Sunrise | Traditional | Theatrical | | March 16, 1991 | 115 minutes |
| Nadia of the Mysterious Seas a.k.a. Nadia: The Secret of Fuzzy ふしぎの海のナディア 劇場用オリジナル版 (Fushigi no Umi no Nadia) | Japan | Sho Aono | Group TAC; Gainax; Sei Young | Traditional | Theatrical | | June 29, 1991 | 90 minutes |
| Ness and Nessy; Ness un Nesija | Latvia | Roze Stiebra | Dauka | Traditional | Theatrical | First Latvian animated feature. | ? | 59 minutes |
| The New Star of the Fallen Mud: Legend of the Incubus 忍者龍剣新堕糜泥の星 淫魔伝説 (Violence Gekiga Shin David no Hoshi: Inma Densetsu) | Japan | Yōichirō Shimatani | Koala Books; Studio Junio; Apollon | Traditional | Direct-to-video; OVA | Standalone sequel installment to the OVA series based on the manga David no Hoshi that ran from December 5, 1989 to June 5, 1990 for four forty-five minute episodes. | March 8, 1991 | 45 minutes |
| Ninja Ryūkenden 忍者龍剣伝 (Legend of the Ninja Dragon Sword) | Japan | Mamoru Kanbe | SMS Corporation; Studio Junio; Pack-In-Video Co., Ltd. | Traditional | Direct-to-video; OVA | | November 22, 1991 | 50 minutes |
| Only Yesterday おもひでぽろぽろ (Omoide Poro Poro) | Japan | Isao Takahata | Studio Ghibli | Traditional | Theatrical | | July 20, 1991 | 118 minutes |
| Otohime Connection 乙姫CONNECTION (Princess Sister Connection) | Japan | Takayuki Goto | Animate; ING, Co. Aniplex; MOVIC; Sony Music Entertainment | Traditional | Direct-to-video; OVA | | December 1, 1991 | 49 minutes |
| The Princess and the Goblin; A hercegnő és a kobold | United Kingdom; Hungary; Japan; United States | József Gémes | Budapest Film; S4C; Pannónia Filmstúdió; NHK | Traditional | Theatrical | First Welsh animated feature. | December 20, 1991 | 82 minutes |
| Psychic Wars 捜獣戦士・サイキック・ウォーズ (Sojuu Senshi – Saikikku Wōzu) | Japan | Tetsuo Imazawa | Toei Animation | Traditional | Direct-to-video; OVA | | February 22, 1991 | 50 minutes |
| Ranma ½: Big Trouble in Nekonron, China らんま½ ~中国寝崑崙大決戦！掟やぶりの激闘篇！！~ (Ranma Nibunnoichi: Chūgoku Nekonron Daikessen! Okite Yaburi no Gekitō Hen!) | Japan | Shūji Iuchi | Studio Deen; Fuji Television Network; Kitty Films; Shogakukan-Shueisha Productions | Traditional | Theatrical | | November 2, 1991 | 74 minutes |
| Robinson and Company; Robinson et compagnie | France | Jacques Colombat | Bat Productions; Belstar Productions; Films A2; Institut National de l'Audiovisuel (INA); Parmentier Productions; Les Films de l'Atalante (distributor) | Traditional | Theatrical | | May 25, 1991 | 70 minutes |
| Rock-a-Doodle | Ireland; United Kingdom; United States | Don Bluth | Goldcrest; Sullivan Bluth Studios Ireland Limited | Traditional | Theatrical | | August 2, 1991 | 74 minutes |
| Roujin Z 老人Z (Rōjin Zetto) | Japan | Hiroyuki Kitakubo | A.P.P.P. | Traditional | Theatrical | | September 14, 1991 | 84 minutes |
| Rover Dangerfield | United States | James L. George; Bob Seeley | Warner Bros. Pictures (distributor); Hyperion Animation | Traditional | Theatrical | | August 2, 1991 | 74 minutes |
| Samuraider: Nazo no Tenkousei サムライダー 謎の転校生 (Samuraider: The Mysterious Transfer Student) | Japan | Hideaki Oba | Daiei Eizo Co. Ltd. (distributor); MTV | Traditional | Direct-to-video; OVA | | February 22, 1991 | 47 minutes |
| Sebastian Star Bear: First Mission; Beertje Sebastiaan: De geheime opdracht | Netherlands | Frank Fehmers | | Traditional | Theatrical | | October 11, 1991 | 79 minutes |
| The Sensualist 好色一代男 (Kōshoku Ichidai Otoko) | Japan | Yukio Abe | | Traditional | | | January 18, 1991 | 55 minutes |
| The Seventh Brother; A Hetedik testvér Bobo und die Hasenbande | Hungary; Germany; United States | Jenő Koltai; Tibor Hernádi | Pannónia Filmstúdió | Traditional | | | June 21, 1991 | 80 minutes |
| Shizukanaru Don – Yakuza Side Story 静かなるドン (Shizukanaru Don) | Japan | Hajime Kamegaki | Tokyo Movie Shinsha; Toho (distributor) | Traditional | Direct-to-video; OVA | | April 12, 1991 | 44 minutes |
| Silent Möbius: The Motion Picture サイレントメビウス THE MOTION PICTURE (Sairento Mebiusu: The Motion Picture) | Japan | Kazuo Tomizawa | Kadokawa Shoten; AIC; Shochiku | Traditional | Theatrical | ? | August 17, 1991 | 54 minutes |
| Sweet Spot スイートスポット | Japan | Gisaburō Sugii | Fuji TV; Group TAC; Tomason; Pony Canyon | Traditional | Direct-to-video; OVA | | April 21, 1991 | 45 minutes |
| Symphonic Poem: Jungle Emperor Leo アニメ交響詩ジャングル大帝 (Anime Kōkyōshi Jungle Taitei) | Japan | Toshio Hirata | Madhouse; Tezuka Productions | Traditional | Direct-to-video; OVA | | April 1, 1991 | 51 minutes |
| To Want to Fly; Volere volare | Italy | Guido Manuli; Maurizio Nichetti | Pentafilm – Bambù; Pentafilm Distribuzione | Traditional/Live action | Theatrical; Live-action animated film | | March 1, 1991 | 94 minutes |
| Ucchare Goshogawara うっちゃれ五所瓦 | Japan | Kazuhiro Ozawa | J.C. Staff; Nihon Eizō; Bandai Music Entertainment (distributor) | Traditional | Direct-to-video; OVA | | October 25, 1991 | 50 minutes |
| Underwater Berets a. k. a. Submarine Berets; Подводные береты (Podvodnyye berety) | Soviet Union | Vladimir Tarasov; Rasa Strautmane; Alexander Mazayev; Alexander Gorlenko; Elena Prorokova | Soyuzmultfilm | Traditional | Theatrical | Final Soviet animated feature before the dissolution of the Soviet Union | ? | 69 minutes |
| Urotsukidōji II: Legend of the Demon Womb 真・超神伝説うろつき童子 魔胎伝 インターナショナル完全版 (Shin Chōjin Densetsu Urotsukidōji: Mataiden International Kanzenban) | Japan | Hideki Takayama | West Cape; Team Mu | Traditional | Theatrical; Compilation film | Compilation film of the two-part OVA series that ran from December 1, 1990, to April 10, 1991. | July 21, 1991 | 88 minutes |
| Urusei Yatsura: Always My Darling a. k. a. Forever My Darling うる星やつら いつだってマイ・ダーリン (Urusei Yatsura Itsudatte Mai Dārin) | Japan | Kumiko Takahashi | Madhouse | Traditional | Theatrical | Sixth and final feature in the Urusei Yatsura film series. | August 18, 1991 | 77 minutes |
| Vampire Wars ヴァンパイヤー戦争 (Vanpaiyā Sensō) | Japan | Kazuhisa Takenouchi | Toei Animation | Traditional | Direct-to-video; OVA | | January 25, 1991 | 50 minutes |
| The White Camel; Le Chameau blanc | Belgium; France; Luxembourg | Raymond Burlet | Les Producteurs TV-Cine-Video (Telcima); Odec Kid Cartoons; 352 Productions; France 3 | Traditional | Television film | | December 29, 1991 | 45 minutes |
| White Fang | Australia | ? | Burbank Animation Studios | Traditional | Television film | | ? | 50 minutes |
| Who's Left Behind? a. k. a. Kayoko's Diary うしろの正面だあれ (Ushiro no Shoumen Daare) | Japan | Seiji Arihara | Mushi Production | Traditional | Theatrical | | March 9, 1991 | 90 minutes |
| Wizardry ウィザードリィ | Japan | Toshiya Shinohara | Shochiku-Fuji Ltd. (distributor); Tokyo Movie Shinsha | Traditional | Direct-to-video; OVA | | February 21, 1991 | 50 minutes |

== Highest-grossing animated films of the year ==
| Rank | Title | Studio | Worldwide gross | Ref. |
|---|---|---|---|---|
| 1 | Beauty and the Beast | Walt Disney Feature Animation | $424,967,620 | |
| 2 | An American Tail: Fievel Goes West | Amblimation | $40,766,041 | |
| 3 | Only Yesterday | Studio Ghibli | $18,846,700 (¥1.87 billion) | |
| 4 | Doraemon: Nobita's Dorabian Nights | Asatsu | $18,000,000 (¥1.80 billion) | |
| 5 | Dragon Ball Z: Cooler's Revenge | Toei Animation | $16,200,000 | |
| 6 | Rock-a-Doodle | Sullivan Bluth Studios | $11,657,385 | |

== See also ==
- List of animated television series of 1991
