= Sweet spot =

Sweet spot or Sweet Spot or The Sweet Spot may refer to:

== Arts ==
=== Music ===
==== Albums ====
- Sweet Spot, by Nino Del Pesco, 1994
- Sweet Spot, compilation by The Sugarman 3, 2001
- Sweet Spot, by Yura Yura Teikoku, 2005
- Sweet Spot, by Kevin Toney, 2003
- Sweet Spot, by Danny Weis, 2006

==== Songs ====
- "Sweet Spot" (Flo Rida song), by Flo Rida featuring Jennifer Lopez from Wild Ones
- "Sweet Spot", by Emmylou Harris and Linda Ronstadt from Western Wall: The Tucson Sessions
- "Sweet Spot" (Kim Petras song), 2019
- "Sweet Spot", by Lindsay Ell, 2023
- "Sweet Spot", by Sara Evans from Slow Me Down
- "Sweet Spot", by Tokyo Jihen from Sports
- "Sweet Spot", by Wild Beasts from Present Tense
- "The Sweet Spot", by The Duckworth Lewis Method from their eponymous album

=== Other ===
- The Sweet Spot, a 2002 Bill Murray comedy television series
- "The Sweet Spot", a season 1 episode of The Loud House television series
- Sweet Spot (manga), 1989 manga by Yutsuko Chūsonji and its 1991 film adaptation
- Sweet Spot, a café in Adventure Time: Fionna and Cake animated television series

== Other uses ==
- Sweet spot (acoustics)
- Sweet spot (economics)
- Sweet spot (sports)
- Sweet spot, in phonation
