= Ark (film) =

2003 animated film

- DVD cover
- Directed by: Hyo Sun Hwang
- Written by: Jordan Itkowitz; Kwak Jae-yong; David Weinstein
- Produced by: Kwang Chul Jung
- Starring: Chiara Zanni; Kirby Morrow; James Woods; Kathleen Barr; Tabitha St. Germain; Lee Tockar; Richard Newman
- Edited by: Bob Bender
- Music by: Dennis C. Brown; David Lowmiller
- Production company: Digital Dream Studios
- Distributed by: Creative Light Worldwide
- Release dates: September 9, 2003 (South Korea); June 2, 2005 (DVD)
- Running time: 84 minutes
- Countries: United States; South Korea
- Languages: English; Korean
- Budget: $7 million

Ark is a 2003 animated science fiction film directed by Hyo Sun Hwang, animated by Digital Rim. It is the flagship project for both the director and the studio.

Attempting to address the failures of Final Fantasy: The Spirits Within, the film merges anime-style visuals with a faster, action-oriented plot more palatable to Western audiences.

The film's plot features many archetypes taken from Final Fantasy-style Japanese console RPGs; a young male resistance fighter, a young girl with special powers who unknowingly is her planet's Messiah, an evil "right-hand man", and a small, cute pet mascot.

== Plot ==
Ark takes place on a dying alien world of Alcian in which a global war between two technologically advanced human civilizations has reduced the planet to a wasteland. The only way to escape the world is by activating the Ark, an ancient giant robot capable of supporting a human city as well as traveling through space.

James Woods plays Jallak, the military general of the reigning civilization, the Storrians, who captured the Ark from the Ceveans. But they are unable to get the Ark to work in order to save their people. The Ceveans, having been enslaved and with only the wasteland to roam free are constantly attacked and brutalised by the Storrians. A leader of their resistance movement is a young resistance fighter named Rogan. Rogan is arrested during a resistance uprising, but manages to escape. He bumps into the general's adopted daughter Amarinth, whom the general had secretly rescued from a Cevean hibernation pod cluster where they had hidden their children for safety. They then meet again during a civilian protest rally and she offers to help hide him and tend to his wounds. Rogan goes with her back to her apartment and meets her pet JuJu, but then vanishes when he discovers she's the Storrian general's daughter.

Baramanda, the Empress's manipulative right-hand man, arrives unexpectedly to take Amarinth into custody after discovering the truth of her lineage. Rogan helps her escape from Baramanda and takes her to the resistance base within the slave quarters of the Ark. There she meets with an elderly man who explains Amarinth's birthright with the help of JuJu, who turns out to have originally belonged to him. Unknown to Rogan, and to Amarinth herself, she turns out to be the daughter of the Cevean priestess who originally built the Ark, Amiel, who had disappeared 100 years earlier. Amiel helped construct not just the Ark the Storrians hold, but another known as The Ark of York. The plans for the Arks passed down from the Gods (another alien race). It took all her strength to create them, causing her to fall into a deep sleep and not awaken again. Before entering her eternal hibernation, she placed her very young daughter into the hidden hibernation pod. Then her body was secretly hidden by her people until discovered by the Storrians.

They find Amiel's molecular structure enables her body to generate a pulsing electronic field throughout her bloodstream. Not only does this make her body perfectly preserved despite how long she had been inactive, it is the reason the Arks will not work: she and Amarinth are descendants of the gods themselves and only they have the ability to pilot the Arks. A cell of her dead blood can supply power to an entire building, but it becomes apparent that no matter how much energy Amiel's body retains, since she is dead it's not enough to move the ark.

Both civilizations scramble to use Amiel's daughter, Amarinth, to activate their Ark and leave the other civilization behind to die. However, Amarinth, who has ties to both civilizations, wishes to try to find a way to use her power to save everyone. She is opposed by the lifeforce-stealing wraith Baramanda, who wishes to steal the power of the Ark for his own selfish purposes.

Amarinth after going to the Ark of York, refuses to pilot it and leave the Storrians behind. Despite her lineage as a Cevean, she was raised as a Storrian. When she finds out her father, Jallak, had been arrested for high treason and was to be executed for hiding her, she demands that Rogan and the others help her rescue him if they want her help. They agree and return to save him.

After freeing Jallak, Baramunda tries to drain Amarith's blood but is stopped by Amiel who awakens momentarily to stop him. All escape but Jallak remains behind to save his people, as the Ark starts to fall apart. Rogan takes Amarinth back to The Ark of York as Baramanda merges with the core of the other Ark and awakens it. Amarinth discovers that, just as her mother Amiel died in constructing the Arks, so she would perish to pilot one. Rogan and Amarinth kiss for the first and final time as she merges with the core of York just as The Ark comes stomping up to it. The Arks clash in a giant battle with the earth breaking down beneath their feet. Amarinth grabs the city plate off of SidArk as Jallak and his friend set the self-destruct mechanism. They perish in the explosion as the planet begins to crumble.

Rogan narrates at the end as it shows The Ark of York kneeling with the SidArk city plate on another planet flourishing with vegetation. He states that no one knew both civilizations would make it and neither does anyone think it would work out, living together, sharing the planet. He continues saying that it was hard to imagine that their old world, which was now no more, might have looked like this before the war. So the Storrians and Ceveans are going to try to coexist, to preserve this planet and Amarinth's sacrifice. It's difficult at times, and Rogan wishes that Amarinth was there to bridge the gap between the two civilizations. He states that they could have learned so much from her, but that they already had.

== Production ==
In September 2000, Digital Dream Studios announced that they would be forming a joint venture named Digital Rim with Rainbow Studios, director John Woo, and his producing partner Terence Chang. Ark was to be the company's first production. The film was produced with a budget of around $7 million. To avoid the disappointing box office performance of Final Fantasy: The Spirits Within (2001)—the first computer-animated feature film to attempt photorealistic characters—Ark's production team put more emphasis on its story and characters.

== See also ==
- List of animated feature films
- List of computer-animated films
