= Dennis C. Brown =

American film and television composer

Dennis Challen Brown (also credited as D. C. Brown or simply Dennis Brown) is an American film and television composer.

He is best known for composing the soundtrack to the 1987–1996 Teenage Mutant Ninja Turtles animated TV series, along with Chuck Lorre—with whom he has continued to work ever since.

He is a six-time BMI TV Music Award winner, for Grace Under Fire and Dharma & Greg, respectively.

== Filmography ==
- Mike & Molly - 2010–2016 TV series
- Ark - 2005 animated film
- Room to Grow - 2005 animated TV special
- Two and a Half Men - 2003–2015 TV series
- Still Standing - 2002–2006 TV series
- Little Shepherd - 2002 direct-to-video animated film
- Dharma & Greg - 1997–2002 TV series (Three-time BMI TV Music Award winner)
- The Golden Goose - 1997 Happily Ever After: Fairy Tales for Every Child animated TV episode
- Budgie the Little Helicopter - 1994–1996 animated TV series
- Dino Babies - 1994–1995 animated TV series
- Snow White and the Magic Mirror - 1994 direct-to-video animated film
- Grace Under Fire - 1993–1996 TV series (Three-time BMI TV Music Award winner)
- Speed Racer - 1993–1994 animated TV series
- What's Up, Mom? - 1992 Chucklewood Critters animated TV special
- Honeybunch - 1992 Chucklewood Critters animated TV special
- James Bond Jr. - 1991–1992 animated TV series
- Toxic Crusaders - 1991 animated TV series
- Barnyard Commandos - 1990 animated TV series
- The California Raisin Show - 1989 animated TV series
- Teenage Mutant Ninja Turtles - 1987–1996 animated TV series
- Little Clowns of Happytown (original songs and themes composer) - 1987–1988 animated TV series
