= Yutsuko Chūsonji =

Japanese manga artist

- 中尊寺ゆつこ
- Born: Yukiko Fujiwara (藤原幸子); May 28, 1962; Yokohama, Kanagawa Prefecture
- Died: January 31, 2005 (aged 42); Yokohama, Kanagawa Prefecture
- Notable work: Sweet Spot, Ojodan, Wild Q

Yutsuko Chūsonji (Japanese: 中尊寺ゆつこ, Hepburn: Chūsonji Yutsuko; May 28, 1962 – January 31, 2005) was the pen name of Japanese manga artist Yukiko Kobayashi (小林 幸子; born Yukiko Fujiwara).

== Early life and career ==
Chūsonji was born on May 28, 1962, in Yokohama, Kanagawa Prefecture. She began drawing manga while in elementary school, and worked as a child model in elementary school and middle school. She took a year off after graduating from the faculty of law at Komazawa University, and developed an interest in golf. She began her career in manga in 1987, winning a rookie award from the manga magazines Business Jump and Manga Action in 1987.

Chūsonji's manga addressed themes of business, politics, and culture, typically in the context of the Japanese bubble era of the late 1980s and early 1990s. Her 1989 manga series Ojodan, first published in 1989, went on to sell over 200,000 copies. That same year she serialized Sweet Spot, a comedy about an office lady (OL) interested in golf, in the magazine SPA!. Sweet Spot coined the term oyaji gal (オヤジギャル; literally "old man gal"), a term used to describe young businesswomen who have the interests and hobbies of middle-aged businessmen, such as golf and horse betting.

In the mid-1990s Chūsonji moved to New York City where she wrote the manga series Wild Q, which follows two Japanese men who travel to Brooklyn to learn about hip-hop. The series, serialized in the men's magazine Popeye, was criticized by the Japanese hip hop community for portraying Japanese hip-hop enthusiasts as ignorant. In response, Chūsonji altered her portrayal of Japanese characters in Wild Q and helped finance Hip-Hop Night Flight, the first successful Japanese hip-hop radio show.

== Personal life and death ==
Chūsonji was married to writer and translator Masaaki Kobayashi, with whom she had a son and a daughter. In August 2004, Chūsonji was diagnosed with colorectal cancer and died on January 31, 2005, at the age of 42 to complications from the disease.
