= Gingitsune =

Japanese manga series

- First tankōbon volume cover, featuring Makoto Saeki and the white fox, Gintarou

ぎんぎつね
- Genre: Comedy; Slice of life; Supernatural
- Manga
- Written by: Sayori Ochiai
- Published by: Shueisha
- Magazine: Ultra Jump
- Original run: May 19, 2009 – October 19, 2022
- Volumes: 18
- Anime television series
- Directed by: Shin Misawa
- Written by: Hiroshi Yamaguchi
- Music by: Tatsuya Kato
- Studio: Diomedéa
- Licensed by: NA: Sentai Filmworks
- Original network: TV Tokyo, TVO, TVA, AT-X
- Original run: October 7, 2013 – December 23, 2013
- Episodes: 12
- icon

Gingitsune (ぎんぎつね; lit. 'Silver Fox') is a Japanese manga series written and illustrated by Sayori Ochiai. It was serialized in Shueisha's seinen manga magazine Ultra Jump from June 2009 to October 2022, with its chapters collected in 18 tankōbon volumes. It follows Makoto Saeki, the daughter of a shrine priest who can see the shrine's messenger, Gintarou, and the everyday lives of the two as a go-between for the gods and humans. A 12-episode anime television series adaptation by Diomedéa was broadcast from October to December 2013.

== Plot ==
Makoto Saeki is the daughter of a shrine priest in a small Inari Shinto shrine dedicated to the God Ukanomitama. When she was 4 years old, her mother died and she inherited an unusual gift called The Sight, allowing her to see the Shrine's Heralds. She met the messenger of the god Inari, an anthropomorphic fox named Gintarou, during the funeral, and he declared her as the fifteenth generation heiress. Gintarou can see a short glimpse into the future and can find lost things despite being rude and unmotivated, but still develops a good friendship with Makoto. As she is the only girl who can see the spirit, both of them decide to be a go-between for the gods and humans as they try to help those who come to the shrine.

== Characters ==
=== Saeki Shrine ===
Makoto Saeki (冴木 まこと, Saeki Makoto)
Voiced by: Hisako Kanemoto
A true successor of the Saeki Inari Shrine. When her mother died before Makoto turned 4 years old, she gained the ability to see heralds, who serve as messengers of the gods. Makoto lives with her father Tatsuo and Gintarou until Satoru and Haru arrive to live with them as well. She is also known in her school for telling accurate fortunes albeit through Gintarou's help.
Gintarou (銀太郎, Gintarō)
Voiced by: Shin-ichiro Miki
The herald of Saeki Shrine, he appears as a huge white fox that protected the shrine for 15 generations of successors of the Saeki family. Although seemingly laid-back and uninterested in human affairs, Gintarou actually cares a lot for Makoto despite his claims that she is annoying. He has a penchant for oranges due to his past where he was saved by a young lady.
Tatsuo Saeki (冴木 達夫, Saeki Tatsuo)
Voiced by: Toshihiko Seki
Makoto's father and also the Saeki Shrine's priest. He does not possess the sight to see Gintarou, unlike his daughter and deceased wife as he was married into the family. However, he knows about Gintarou and hopes to be able to see him. He was born Tatsuo Toyokura, but adopted his wife's surname when he chose to become a priest instead of a brewer.
Satoru Kamio (神尾 悟, Kamio Satoru)
Voiced by: Kenshō Ono
The successor to the Kamio Shrine, he inherited the sight from his grandfather after his death since Satoru's parents died earlier due to an accident.. He was raised by some relatives who mistreated him and he was isolated from the others. He later moved away to stay at Saeki Shrine with Haru. He is popular with the girls in school and also proficient in Kendo. In the manga, he is shown to slowly take a liking to Makoto and has a rivalry with Nanami Kosugi.
Haru (ハル)
Voiced by: Ayumi Fujimura
An 80-year-old fox herald. Originally one of the heralds of Kamio Shrine, she later became Gintarou's partner herald when she follows Satoru to the Saeki Shrine. She was once a young fox who had been killed by a vehicle and her spirit followed Satoru's great-grandfather to Kamio Shrine and became a herald. She is very attached to Satoru and is jealous of any girl who approaches him.

=== Shinto West Public High School ===
Yumi Ikegami (池上 ユミ, Ikegami Yumi)
Voiced by: Chinatsu Akasaki
Makoto's classmate who once seek help from her to resolve her relationship problem with Shōhei. She is laid-back but stubborn and also at odds with Hiwako's personality, but eventually she becomes close friends with Hiwako and Makoto after being invited by Makoto to stay at her shrine. She is interested to work in any jobs with animals.
Hiwako Funabashi (船橋 日輪子, Funabashi Hiwako)
Voiced by: Ami Koshimizu
Makoto's classmate and also the vice-president of the student council. She is a model student who comes from a wealthy family which specialises in tea ceremonies. She used to be cold to others due to her strict upbringing but she changes after becoming close friends with Makoto and Yumi. She also seems to have a crush on Makoto's father.
Seishirou Kirishima (桐島 清志郎, Kirishima Seishirō)
Voiced by: Tomokazu Sugita
The blond-hair 3rd-year student council president. He looks like a foreigner as his grandmother was a British. He has also known Taisuke since they were in the same elementary school. He is obsessed over Hiwako.
Taisuke Kinukawa (絹川 泰介, Kinukawa Taisuke)
Voiced by: Yūki Ono
Captain of the Kendo Club with a big stature. He is bad at making tofu although his family owns a tofu shop. He recognises Satoru's efforts that he places on Kendo that he manages to stop him from quitting the Kendo Club.
Nanami Kosugi (小杉 七海, Kosugi Nanami)
Voiced by: Hiroyuki Yoshino
Member of the Kendo Club. He despises Satoru over his poor attitude. He also seems to have developed a crush on Makoto.
Kozue Ashihara (葦原 梢, Ashihara Kozue)
Voiced by: Yō Taichi
Makoto's classmate whose family owns an inn. She loves to eat and intends to be a chef or nutritionist.
Saki Suzui (鈴井 咲, Suzui Saki)
Voiced by: Ayaka Suwa
Makoto's classmate. She is working part-time to save money to go into nursing.

=== Heralds ===
Kinjiro (金次郎, Kinjirō)
Voiced by: Kazuhiko Inoue
Another fox herald and Gintarou's partner who left to parts unknown centuries before.
Saimaru (才丸) and Utamaru (歌丸)
Voiced by: Naomi Kusumi (Saimaru) and Yōji Ueda (Utamaru)
Two old lion-dog heralds who live at a Matsunō altar behind the Shoubai Grand Shrine. Saimaru is 1500-years old and Utamaru is 1400-years old.
Kame (カメ)
Voiced by: Kanehira Yamamoto
A 300-year-old turtle herald whose shrine was destroyed and found a new home with Saimaru and Utamaru thanks to Makoto and Gintarou.
Fu (風) and Fuku (吹)
Voiced by: Sanae Fuku (Fu) and Kotori Koiwai (Fuku)
Two 60-year-old young monkey heralds from an abandoned shrine inside Amabuki Temple who like to play pranks on humans.
Otomatsu (乙松)
The other fox herald of Kamio Shrine.
Tamachiyo (珠千代)
The rabbit herald of Sumiyoshi Shrine.
Hama (波真)
The other rabbit herald of Sumiyoshi Shrine.
Mitsuki (深月)
The other rabbit herald of Sumiyoshi Shrine.
Nachi (那智)
The crow herald of Kumano Shrine.
Tetsuro (鉄郎, Tetsurō)
A wolf herald who does not live in a specific shrine and travels to various shrines with his human friend Touko.
Gunji (軍司)
The rooster herald of Kota Jingu Shrine.
Watari (亘理)
The other rooster herald of Kota Jingu Shrine.

=== Other characters ===
Shohei Amamoto (天本 将平, Amamoto Shōhei)
Voiced by: Tomokazu Seki
Yumi's boyfriend and studies at a different school. He lives in Amabuki Temple and his father is the head priest of the temple.
Shinichi Yoshizumi (吉住 真一, Yoshizumi Shin'ichi)
Voiced by: Hirofumi Nojima
He is the assistant of Hiwako's father who takes charge in driving Hiwako to and from school. He is 10 years older than Hiwako and appears to have a crush on her.
Yoshitomo Takami (高見 義友, Takami Yoshitomo)
Voiced by: Hiroaki Hirata
Tatsuo's childhood friend and a retired priest. He currently owns an Izakaya. He helps out Tatsuo with the shrine's Purification Ceremony every year.
Etsuko Toyokura (豊倉 江津子, Toyokura Etsuko)
Voiced by: Atsuko Tanaka
Makoto's aunt and Tatsuo's older sister. Her family owns the local Toyokura brewery. She helps out Tatsuo with the shrine's Purification Ceremony every year.
Touko Tsumugi (紬 十子, Tsumugi Tōko)
A 28-year-old former editor and novelist. Like Makoto and Satoru she has the sight but she is an orphan. She was once cornered to the point of thinking of suicide but was saved by Tetsuro, a stray wolf spirit she met by chance. She has been taking care of him ever since.

== Media ==
=== Manga ===
Written and illustrated by Sayori Ochiai, Gingitsune was first published as a two-one-shot chapter story in Shueisha's seinen manga magazine Ultra Jump on February 19 and May 19, 2008. It started as a full-fledged series in the same magazine on May 19, 2009. The manga was on hiatus several times. The series finished after a 14-year run on October 19, 2022. Shueisha collected its chapters in eighteen tankōbon volumes, released from September 18, 2009. to October 19, 2022.

==== Volumes ====
No.	Release date	ISBN
01	September 18, 2009	978-4-08-877731-3
02	March 19, 2010	978-4-08-877833-4
03	August 19, 2010	978-4-08-879021-3
04	January 19, 2011	978-4-08-879098-5
05	July 19, 2011	978-4-08-879181-4
06	December 19, 2011	978-4-08-879248-4
07	July 19, 2012	978-4-08-879359-7
08	January 18, 2013	978-4-08-879504-1
09	September 19, 2013	978-4-08-879653-6
10	October 18, 2013	978-4-08-879670-3
11	November 19, 2014	978-4-08-879787-8
12	June 19, 2015	978-4-08-890212-8
13	January 19, 2017	978-4-08-890583-9
14	April 17, 2020	978-4-08-891538-8
15	November 19, 2020	978-4-08-891729-0
16	October 19, 2021	978-4-08-892113-6
17	September 16, 2022	978-4-08-892447-2
18	October 19, 2022	978-4-08-892478-6

=== Light novel ===
No.	Title	Release date	ISBN
1	Gingitsune Spring Summer Fall Winter; Gin gitsune shunkashūtō (ぎんぎつね春夏秋冬)	November 19, 2013	978-4087033045

=== Audio drama ===
An audio drama of the manga is released in collaboration with Shueisha and Pony Canyon in 2010 under the VOMIC label. The voices of the drama includes Kanae Itō as Makoto and Toshihiko Seki as Gintarou.

=== Anime ===
An anime television series adaptation was announced in April 2013. Diomedéa animated the series with Shin Misawa serving as the director, Hiroshi Yamaguchi as the series writer and both Mayuko Matsumoto and Naomi Ide as the character designers. Tatsuya Katou composed the music. The series was broadcast on TV Tokyo from October 7 to December 23, 2013. (Note: TV Tokyo listed the air dates for the series on Sunday at 25:05, effectively Monday at 1:05 a.m. JST.) It also aired on the TV Osaka, TV Aichi, and AT-X stations. The opening theme song "tiny lamp" is performed by Fhána and the ending theme song "Gekkō Story" (月光STORY, Gekkō Story; lit. Moonlight Story) is sung by Screen Mode.

Crunchyroll also announced that they would stream the series under the name Gingitsune: Messenger Fox of the Gods. The anime has been licensed by Sentai Filmworks.

==== Episodes ====
No.	Title	Original release date
1	"The Fifteenth Successor and Gintarou"; Transliteration: "Juugodaime to Gintarō" (Japanese: 十五代目と銀太郎)	October 7, 2013
Gintarou is a fox spirit that has been protecting the small Inari temple since the Edo era. Saeki Makoto's family possesses the power to see the gods' agent, but the ability is limited to one living relative at a time. When Makoto's mother died while she was still young, Makoto inherited the ability as the sole remaining family member. With the help of fox spirit's power, Makoto and Gintarou help the people of their community, in spite of their many differences.
2	"Learning to Compromise"; Transliteration: "Yuzuriaou youni" (Japanese: 譲り合うように)	October 14, 2013
Funabashi, uptight classmate being friends with Saeki and Ikegami due to opening up after bullying.
3	"The Place Where the Gods are" Transliteration: "Kamisama no Iru Tokoro" (Japanese: 神様のいる所)	October 21, 2013
Helping a turtle herald who lost his shrine to a new one with komainu.
4	"Satoru and Haru"; Transliteration: "Satoru to Haru" (Japanese: 悟とハル)	October 28, 2013
Introvert kendo boy with the sight joins Saeki along with his young fox herald Haru, but after a fight Haru runs away.
5	"Season of Warmth"; Transliteration: "Atatakai Kisetsu" (Japanese: あたたかい季節)	November 4, 2013
While looking for Haru, we learn more about Haru and Kamio's pasts. They make up.
6	"How Do I Look?"; Transliteration: "Donnakao shiteru" (Japanese: どんな顔してる?)	November 11, 2013
Saeki, Ikegami and Funabashi throw a welcome party for Kamio. After being stubborn he opens up a bit.
7	"Shrines and Temples"; Transliteration: "Jinja to Otera" (Japanese: 神社とお寺)	November 18, 2013
The gang goes to Ikegami bf's place where two monkey heralds are making pranks.
8	"Humans Are Strange"; Transliteration: "Ningen tte Hen" (Japanese: 人間って変)	November 25, 2013
Funabashi wants to buy a present for her dad, so she her driver/father assistant Yoshizumi spends time with her.
9	"I'm Sorry"; Transliteration: "Gomen'nasai" (Japanese: ごめんなさい)	December 2, 2013
Kids from the neighbourhood break things from the Shrine, Haru gets lost but all ends well.
10	"It Really Doesn't Matter"; Transliteration: "Iijan Betsuni" (Japanese: いーじゃん別に)	December 9, 2013
Kamio spends time with the kendo club's captain Kinukawa.
11	"Makoto's Future"; Transliteration: "Makoto no Mirai" (Japanese: まことの未来)	December 16, 2013
Saeki and Kamio ponders about the future while preparing for a biannual purification ceremony. People from all around come to help.
12	"Summer Cleansing"; Transliteration: "Nagoshinoharae" (Japanese: 夏越の祓)	December 23, 2013

== Reception ==
Stig Høgset from THEM Anime Reviews praised the series' character designs for being "well-designed and well-animated" and for tackling serious topics outside of its lackadaisical tone, despite the conflicts being "overreactions made for dramatic purposes rather than realistic drama." He concluded by putting it alongside Natsume's Book of Friends as a good companion piece, calling it "relatively light and enjoyable entertainment with enough substance to not just be empty calories, and an appropriately sweet ending episode that leaves a possibility and a desire for more." Rebecca Silverman of Anime News Network reviewed the complete anime series in 2015. While finding criticism in the awkward character animations, misplaced musical score in places and lack of cultural notes about shrines, Silverman praised the series for its charming and believable characters, elegant backgrounds with distinctive shrine designs and for being informative on Shintoism, concluding that "Gingitsune is a charming gem of a show. It isn't action-packed or even particularly continuous in terms of plot, but it is warm and cozy and worth a visit to the Saeki Shrine."
