= List of James Bond Jr. episodes =

This is a list of James Bond Jr. episodes, a 1991 animated series based on the nephew of the fictional spy James Bond. The series aired while there were no new James Bond feature films out.

== Series overview ==
Season	Episodes	Originally released	
Season	Episodes	First released	Last released
1	65	September 16, 1991	December 13, 1991

== Episodes ==
=== Season 1 (1991) ===
No.	Title	Directed by	Written by	Original release date	Prod. code
1	"The Beginning"	Bill Hutten, Tony Love	Francis Moss, Ted Pedersen	September 16, 1991	9075-018
En route to his new school, Warfield Academy, James is chased by S.C.U.M. who is interested in stealing the Aston Martin DB5.
2	"Earth Cracker"	Bill Hutten, Tony Love	Mel Gilden	September 17, 1991	9075-015
James, I.Q. and Tracy travel to find El Dorado, the Lost City of Gold. They are met by Oddjob and Goldfinger and their deadly weapon, Earth Cracker.
3	"The Chameleon"	Bill Hutten, Tony Love	Jeffrey Scott	September 18, 1991	9075-028
A class trip to Washington, D.C. is curtailed by a face-changing villain with plans to steal a top-secret army prototype from the Pentagon.
4	"Shifting Sands"	Bill Hutten, Tony Love	Doug Molitor	September 19, 1991	9075-005
While assisting in the excavation of an ancient Egyptian tomb, James is caught up in Pharaoh Fearo's plans to steal oil from under the Middle East.
5	"Plunder Down Under"	Bill Hutten, Tony Love	Perry Martin	September 20, 1991	9075-017
When Tracy's sailor uncle goes missing along with his ship off the coast of Greece, a scuba expedition reveals a fiendish plot by Walker D. Plank to create a deadly pirate fleet.
6	"A Chilling Affair"	Bill Hutten, Tony Love	Mark Jones	September 23, 1991	9075-022
Dr. No kidnaps Professor Frost, a scientist involved in cryogenics, in order to thaw out a master criminal who hid his fortunes before being frozen.
7	"Nothing to Play With"	Bill Hutten, Tony Love	Jeffrey Scott	September 24, 1991	9075-036
A desperate plea for help from Hong Kong sends James and his friends into a head-on collision with Walker D. Plank's illegitimate foray into toy manufacture.
8	"Location: Danger"	Bill Hutten, Tony Love	Misty Taggart	September 25, 1991	9075-019
Felony O' Toole kidnaps both Anna and Prof. Braintrust so that S.C.U.M. can force him to program the Galaxy defense system which they stole.
9	"The Eiffel Missile"	Bill Hutten, Tony Love	Doug Molitor	September 26, 1991	9075-001
After encountering Skullcap in a daring airport escape, James intercepts Dr. Derange's plans of launching a nuclear missile at Moscow from a launch silo beneath the Eiffel Tower.
10	"A Worm in the Apple"	Bill Hutten, Tony Love	Jeffrey Scott	September 27, 1991	9075-020
When Phoebe invites James to the official opening of New York's Mile High Skyscraper, he encounters the Worm, a terrorist bent on sinking the city.
11	"Valley of the Hungry Dunes"	Bill Hutten, Tony Love	Steven J. Fisher	September 30, 1991	9075-012
After rescuing the daughter of Sheikh Yabootie, James and his friends are invited to his royal palace, where they discover Dr. No's sinister plot to drain all the aquifers of the Middle East.
12	"Pompeii and Circumstance"	Bill Hutten, Tony Love	Jeffrey Scott	October 1, 1991	9075-044
The Worm's plan to ransack the ancient treasury temple of Pompeii spells disaster for the city above.
13	"Never Give a Villain a Fair Shake"	Bill Hutten, Tony Love	Francis Moss	October 2, 1991	9075-010
Walker D. Plank hijacks a ship carrying a device capable of producing powerful earthquakes and threatens to flood Britain with a tidal wave.
14	"City of Gold"	Bill Hutten, Tony Love	Mark Jones	October 3, 1991	9075-024
Goldie Finger uses the curse of the golden dragon to scare off local people to her plan to melt down an ancient city made of solid gold into her stolen tanker. However, she was not counting on James to arrive at the Caribbean island for a field trip.
15	"Never Lose Hope"	Bill Hutten, Tony Love	Benjamin Pollack	October 4, 1991	9075-014
A new science teacher at Warfield Academy, Miss Eternal, quickly makes herself popular with the pupils – but is soon kidnapped, apparently by agents of S.C.U.M.
16	"No Such Loch"	Bill Hutten, Tony Love	Jeffrey Scott	October 7, 1991	9075-048
Walker D. Plank and Jaws are in Scotland, using the legend of the Loch Ness Monster as a cover for an attempt to steal powerful missiles from the British Navy.
17	"Appointment in Macau"	Bill Hutten, Tony Love	Mary Crawford, Alan Templeton	October 8, 1991	9075-006
Dr. No kidnaps Lily Mai, a new student at Warfield, in an attempt to settle old scores with Macau's chief criminal organization, the Raven Triad.
18	"Lamp of Darkness"	Bill Hutten, Tony Love	Mark Jones	October 9, 1991	9075-042
James, IQ and Phoebe take off for the Middle East in a race to find the legendary Lamp of Aladdin before Maximillian Cortex gets there first.
19	"Hostile Takeover"	Bill Hutten, Tony Love	Sue Shakespeare, David Holmes	October 10, 1991	9075-021
James and his friends are forced to fight a war on the homefront when Warfield Academy's staff are mysteriously called away for a retraining program.
20	"Cruise to Oblivion"	Bill Hutten, Tony Love	Jeffrey Scott	October 11, 1991	9075-052
During a cruise on one of Phoebe's father's ships, James runs into Goldfinger in Bermuda during his attempt to raise a sunken galleon filled with gold.
21	"A Race Against Disaster"	Bill Hutten, Tony Love	Jeffrey Scott	October 14, 1991	9075-026
Dr. Derange uses the 24-hour race at Le Mans, France, as a cover for a daring plutonium theft from a nearby nuclear facility.
22	"The Inhuman Race"	Bill Hutten, Tony Love	Jeffrey Scott	October 15, 1991	9075-038
James and his friends head to South Germany to represent Warfield in high school competition. However, Trevor gets abducted by Skullcap and Nick Nack so that Dr. Derange can use him for a guinea pig to bring a prototype mutant android to life.
23	"Live and Let's Dance"	Bill Hutten, Tony Love	Alan Templeton, Mary Crawford	October 16, 1991	9075-004
James and his friends escort a ballerina to Switzerland, but Baron Von Skarin hires an assassin, posing as a famous ballet dancer, to go after her and the King.
24	"The Sword of Power"	Bill Hutten, Tony Love	Ted Pedersen	October 17, 1991	9075-003
James and his friends head to Tokyo, Japan to recover a Japanese sword stolen by Dr. No's Ninjas in his plan to learn of the sword's powerful material origin and uses it to create a powerful weapon for his arsenal.
25	"It's All in the Timing"	Bill Hutten, Tony Love	Francis Moss, Ted Pedersen	October 18, 1991	9075-013
Dr. Derange's plot threatens to stop the rotation of the Earth. It is up to James, IQ and a Swiss police officer to stop him. Elsewhere, Trevor Noseworthy cheats in the bicycle race in Bern by using IQ's bicycle motor on his bike.
26	"Dance of the Toreadors"	Bill Hutten, Tony Love	Alan Templeton, Mary Crawford	October 21, 1991	9075-008
When IQ falls in love with flamenco dancer Dulce Nada and follows her to Pamplona, he has no idea that she's unwittingly embroiled in Baron von Skarin's plot to cause a nuclear meltdown in Britain.
27	"Fountain of Terror"	Bill Hutten, Tony Love	Jeffrey Scott	October 22, 1991	9075-046
James, IQ and Phoebe go to Tibet to find IQ's cousin, who was kidnapped by Dr. Derange, Jaws, Ms. Fortune and Snuffer, who use him to show him the way to a secret village where he hides a fountain that gives people eternal life.
28	"The Emerald Key"	Bill Hutten, Tony Love	Sandra Ryan	October 23, 1991	9075-031
James and IQ's friendship is under threat when IQ has taken a fancy on a pretty girl who uncle has been abducted by Derange to get his hand on a golden statue which is a key to a fortune of gold in a temple in Mexico.
29	"Ship of Terror"	Bill Hutten, Tony Love	John Bates	October 24, 1991	9075-033
A theft by a S.C.U.M. agent of a pendant belonging to James's friend Prince Malmo leads the gang on a deadly cruise, stalked by Walker D. Plank and a metallic henchman.
30	"Deadly Recall"	Bill Hutten, Tony Love	Jeffrey Scott	October 25, 1991	9075-054
James and the gang's trip to Monte Carlo with Trevor turns into another adventure when Dr. Derange uses his hypnotic roulette wheel to hypnotize and rob wealthy people blind before transforming them into S.C.U.M agents.
31	"Red Star One"	Bill Hutten, Tony Love	Jeffrey Scott	October 28, 1991	9075-040
The Russian treasury reserve is in danger when Dr. Derange and the Chameleon seize control of a satellite laser system.
32	"Scottish Mist"	Bill Hutten, Tony Love	John Bates	October 29, 1991	9075-023
James and Gordo help their science teacher Prof. What to find his former colleague who is abducted by Spoiler so that Baron Von Skarin can learn the formula to his secret catalyst for clearer fuel.
33	"The Art of Evil"	Bill Hutten, Tony Love	Jeffrey Scott	October 30, 1991	9075-060
James has to clear his name when the Chameleon uses his ability to frame him for the second museum robbery in Paris. At the same time, he has stop the Chameleon and his partner Lex Illusion from stealing the Mona Lisa.
34	"The Heartbreak Caper"	Bill Hutten, Tony Love	Marc Scott Zicree	October 31, 1991	9075-041
Ms. Fortune uses the power of love on Mr. Milbanks so that she can get her hands on a new discovered painting of Da Shinci. But James and Tracy are not fooled by her disguise.
35	"Mindfield"	Bill Hutten, Tony Love	Alan Templeton, Mary Crawford	November 1, 1991	9075-011
Ms. Fortune kidnaps a female Warfield student who has telepathic ability for her latest plot.
36	"Leonardo da Vinci's Vault"	Bill Hutten, Tony Love	Jeffrey Scott	November 4, 1991	9075-030
James and his friends head to Venice when they find out that the museum that IQ went to visit got robbed by a mastermind named Maximillian Cortex who stole a newly discovered painting of Leonardo da Vinci.
37	"Far Out West"	Bill Hutten, Tony Love	David Wise	November 5, 1991	9075-055
James helps Mr. Mitchell find his missing brother when they arrive at his ranch in South Dakota.
38	"Avalanche Run"	Bill Hutten, Tony Love	Jim Carlson, Terrence McDonnell	November 6, 1991	9075-016
In S.C.U.M Lord's latest scheme to rob the evacuated cities of Switzerland, Jaws and Nick Nack hijack a train with James's friends on board and send it on a collision course for a nuclear power plant.
39	"Queen's Ransom"	Bill Hutten, Tony Love	Jim Carlson, Terrence McDonnell	November 7, 1991	9075-007
In Hong Kong, James helps a young woman named Jade, who escapes from Walker D. Plank, who took her father and stole a shipment of slikworm missiles.
40	"Barbella's Big Attraction"	Bill Hutten, Tony Love	Mary Crawford, Alan Templeton	November 8, 1991	9075-047
Barbella's high blood pressure leads her to mutiny when S.C.U.M Lord insulted her. So Barbella sends an incoming asteroid to destroy Rio de Janeiro where the S.C.U.M conference is taking place.
41	"There But For Ms. Fortune"	Bill Hutten, Tony Love	Mary Crawford, Alan Templeton	November 11, 1991	9075-002
Ms. Fortune attempts to kidnap IQ and him for ransom for Q's ice formula so that she use it to freeze the Colorado River, thus shutting down most of the hydroelectric power of the United States and enabling her to corner the market on electricity. But her plan goes awfully wrong when she mistakes Trevor for IQ and kidnap him instead.
42	"Invaders from S.C.U.M."	Bill Hutten, Tony Love	Jennie Tremaine	November 12, 1991	9075-049
Student Hayley Comet and her scientist father are both convinced they have made first contact when a UFO lands at Warfield, but James suspects the truth is closer to home.
43	"Going for the Gold"	Bill Hutten, Tony Love	Doug Molitor	November 13, 1991	9075-037
Barbella makes several failed attempts to get rid of James when he and his friends represent Warfield in the High School games in Barcelona; Goldie Finger plans to rob the Columbus museum of its golden treasury.
44	"A Derange Mind"	Bill Hutten, Tony Love	Jeffrey Scott	November 14, 1991	9075-062
When an UFO is shot down by a military close to New York, the craft is taken for analysis to a military research laboratory.
45	"Catching the Wave"	Bill Hutten, Tony Love	Alan Swayze	November 15, 1991	9075-009
Jaws and Nick Nack prepare to gatecrash a secret meeting of the Government Technology Committee.
46	"The Last of the Tooboos"	Bill Hutten, Tony Love	Mark Jones	November 18, 1991	9075-032
While visiting the London Zoo, James interrupts Skullcap during his theft of a rare animal, a tooboo, whose unusual enzymes Dr. Derange wants for himself.
47	"S.C.U.M. on the Water"	Bill Hutten, Tony Love	Jeffrey Scott	November 19, 1991	9075-064
James and his comrades are planning a great day out at the regatta. However, he does not anticipate the appearance of Captain Walker D. Plank, whose latest scheme involves building the deadliest ship that ever hoisted the Jolly Roger. He kidnaps marine engineer Walter Gibson to this end.
48	"Goldie's Gold Scam"	Bill Hutten, Tony Love	Alan Swayze	November 20, 1991	9075-027
While in Africa, the group is attacked by a rhino wearing a strap with a micro chip in it. Tracking it back to its source, James and IQ uncover a plot by Goldfinger and Goldie Finger to seize all the gold mines in the area for themselves.
49	"Canine Caper"	Bill Hutten, Tony Love	Benjamin Pollack	November 21, 1991	9075-025
James, IQ and Gordo use a stray dog which follows James back to the Warfield to locate its master who had the security plan of Scotland Yard, who is abducted by Skullcap; Dr. Derange needs the microfilm so that he can break through Scotland Yard's security so that he can place his acid bomb in Scotland Yard's building foundation and destroy it.
50	"Weather or Not"	Bill Hutten, Tony Love	Francis Moss, Ted Pedersen	November 22, 1991	9075-057
Dr. Derange takes control of the national weather satellite so that he would have complete control of the weather across England. He attempts to cause chaotic weather across the capital so Skullcap and his henchmen can do a series of robberies.
51	"Ol' Man River"	Bill Hutten, Tony Love	Francis Moss, Ted Pedersen	November 25, 1991	9075-029
Captain Walker D. Plank plans to flood New Orleans by destroying the Levee with a large amount of explosive placed in a fake 'River Queen'. During evacuation of New Orleans, Plank attempts to use this to his advantage to gain access to the U.S. mint and steal the printing press.
52	"Between a Rock and a Hard Place"	Bill Hutten, Tony Love	Jeffery Scott	November 26, 1991	9075-050
James and his friends race against time to get to an advanced prototype fighter jet which has crashed somewhere in wild country of Australia before Dr. Derange and his henchmen get there first.
53	"Sherlock IQ"	Bill Hutten, Tony Love	John Fox	November 27, 1991	9075-061
In London, James and IQ come from a Sherlock Holmes convention, but Baron von Skarin, with his henchmen Jaws and Nick Nack, use a prototype super tank they stole and attack the city, but then a knock on the head causes IQ to think he is Sherlock Holmes.
54	"Killer Asteroid"	Bill Hutten, Tony Love	Mary Crawford, Alan Templeton	November 28, 1991	9075-039
Goldfinger hijacks a space shuttle in midair so that he can use it to bring an asteroid made up solid gold on a collision course with Earth. With the tracing software being designed by IQ, James and the gang head to Iceland where the signal of the space shuttle is coming from.
55	"Danger Train"	Bill Hutten, Tony Love	Steve Hayes	November 29, 1991	9075-045
James and IQ get caught in a S.C.U.M. feud between Ms. Fortune and Walker D. Plank over stealing a super powerful engine from the 'Cold Fusion' Train.
56	"Quantum Diamonds"	Bill Hutten, Tony Love	Jeffrey Scott	December 2, 1991	9075-065
James and his friend visit Yellowstone National Park where Dr. Derange attempts to extract a crystal from Old Faithful for his latest plot.
57	"Rubies Aren't Forever"	Bill Hutten, Tony Love	Kent Stevenson	December 3, 1991	9075-035
James saves a girl named Ruby who was captured by a gang who wanted her necklace, but she was set up by her aunt, Tiara Hotstones, who tries to bring them to Baron von Skarin in Germany to use them to steal the F-15 Jets for himself.
58	"Garden of Evil"	Bill Hutten, Tony Love	Perry Martin	December 4, 1991	9075-051
In Hong Kong, Trevor picks a purple rose, but it somehow hypnotizes him; now it is up to James, IQ, Tracey, and Jasmine to go to the field of the purple rose to find a cure; however, Dr. No and Oddjob try to stop their plan.
59	"The Thing in the Ice"	Bill Hutten, Tony Love	Francis Moss, Ted Pedersen	December 5, 1991	9075-043
The gang is in Antarctica, where they see the massive devastation caused by a metallic monster with acid-spitting tentacles.
60	"Goldie Finger at the End of the Rainbow"	Bill Hutten, Tony Love	Mark Jones	December 6, 1991	9075-034
James, Phoebe, Gordo, and Trevor head to Ireland to investigate a haunted castle which was taken by a leprechaun who was actually Nick Nack who is scaring the people to find the secret treasure room for Goldie Finger.
61	"Dutch Treat"	Bill Hutten, Tony Love	John Bates	December 9, 1991	9075-059
In Holland, Tiara Hotstones stole an emerald from the museum to get to a counterfeit artist named Rembrandt, but she accidentally drops it into a box of chocolates that Phoebe brought.
62	"No Time to Lose"	Bill Hutten, Tony Love	Francis Moss, Ted Pedersen	December 10, 1991	9075-063
A case of mistaken identity leads Spoiler to kidnap IQ, as part of Dr. No's plan to build an impenetrable government airship known as the Vulture.
63	"Monument to S.C.U.M."	Bill Hutten, Tony Love	Jeffrey Scott	December 11, 1991	9075-058
James and the gang are in Arizona and entering the scientist competition contest. Meanwhile, Dr. Derange uses a magnetic generator to change the Earth's core.
64	"Northern Lights"	Bill Hutten, Tony Love	Francis Moss, Ted Pedersen	December 12, 1991	9075-053
The Warfield students arrive in Toronto on a clean-up project, unaware that Baron von Skarin is also in town with a scheme to hold the city's electricity for ransom.
65	"Thor's Thunder"	Bill Hutten, Tony Love	Mark Jones, Jeffrey Scott	December 13, 1991	9075-056
Captain Walker D. Plank and Skullcap are on the prowl in Norway to find Mjölnir, which gives infinite power to whoever wields it.

== See also ==
- Outline of James Bond
