= Shin Misawa =

Japanese anime director

Shin Misawa (三沢 伸, Misawa Shin) is a Japanese anime director and storyboard artist. He is on general staff at Studio Comet, and handles production and directing jobs.

== Works ==
Credits are as director unless otherwise indicated.

- Ashita Tenki ni Naare (TV series, production)
- Ask Dr. Rin! (TV series; Director)
- Capeta (TV series; Director)
- Chikyū SOS Sore Ike Kororin (TV series, storyboards)
- DT Eightron (TV series)
- Fire Emblem (OVA; Director, Storyboard, Production Design)
- Geobreeders: Breakthrough (OVA; series director, storyboards)
- Gingitsune (TV series; Director, Storyboard (eps. 1, 7, 12), Episode Director (ep. 12))
- High School! Kimengumi (movie; Director (part 2))
- High School Mystery: Gakuen Nanafushigi (TV series; director, storyboards (ep.11))
- I Left My A-Rank Party to Help My Former Students Reach the Dungeon Depths! (TV series; Concept Design)
- Initial D (TV series; (1st stage, extra stage) Director, Storyboard (eps 1–2, 4–5), Episode Director (ep 1))
- Kochira Katsushika-ku Kameari Kōen-mae Hashutsujo (TV series; Director)
- Meimon! Dai-san Yakyūbu (TV series, production)
- Shin Megami Tensei: D Children Light & Dark (TV series (2002); Director (eps 27-52), Storyboard (ep 52))
- Tsuyoshi Shikkari Shinasai (TV series; Director, Storyboard, Episode Director)
