= White Fang (disambiguation) =

White Fang is a novel by Jack London.

White Fang may also refer to:

== Adaptations of the novel ==
- White Fang (1925 film), an American silent film directed by Laurence Trimble
- White Fang (1936 film), an American film directed by David Butler
- The White Fang, a 1946 Soviet film directed by Aleksandr Zguridi
- White Fang (1973 film), an Italian film directed by Lucio Fulci
- White Fang (1991 film), an American film directed by Randal Kleiser
- White Fang (1991 animated film), an Australian animated film produced by Burbank Animation Studios
- White Fang (TV series), a 1993 television series
- White Fang (1997 animated film), and American animated film
- White Fang (2018 film), a French animated film directed by Alexandre Espigares

== Other uses ==
- White Fang (puppet), a character on the Soupy Sales television show
- White Fang (Mobile Suit Gundam Wing), a fictional organization in the Japanese anime Mobile Suit Gundam Wing
- White Fang (RWBY), a fictional organization in the American animated web series RWBY
- White Fang, a band featuring Erik Gage, founder of Gnar Tapes
