= Okama Report =

1989 manga by Hideo Yamamoto

- Volume 1 cover

おカマ白書 (Okama Hakusho)
- Genre: Romantic comedy
- Created by: Hideo Yamamoto
- Manga
- Written by: Hideo Yamamoto
- Published by: Shogakukan
- Imprint: YS Comics
- Magazine: Weekly Young Sunday
- Original run: 1989 – 1991
- Volumes: 5
- Original video animation
- Directed by: Teruo Kogure
- Music by: Jirō Takemura
- Studio: Knack Productions
- Released: March 12, 1991 – February 6, 1992
- Episodes: 3

Okama Report (Japanese: おカマ白書, Hepburn: Okama Hakusho) is a Japanese manga series written and illustrated by Hideo Yamamoto. The series follows Shinya Okama, a straight college student who works at an okama bar (a cross-dressing gay bar). Okama Report was serialized in the manga magazine Weekly Young Sunday from 1989 to 1991, and was adapted into a three-part original video animation (OVA) from 1991 to 1992.

== Synopsis ==
While drunk at a party, college student Shinya Okama's friends dress him as a woman. He later sees a photograph of himself at the party, but with no recollection of the incident, he believes his own image to be that of a beautiful woman and falls in love at first sight with himself. Upon learning the truth, he is persuaded to work at an okama bar – a cross-dressing gay bar – where he adopts the drag persona of "Catherine". On his first night at the bar he meets Miki, a female college student and regular at the bar with an uncanny resemblance to Catherine. The series follows Shinya as he attempts to court Miki while concealing his true identity.

== Characters ==
Shinya Okama / Catherine (岡間進也 / キャサリン)
Portrayed by: Ryō Horikawa (Shinya) and Yuri Amano (Catherine)
A straight college student who works at an okama bar.
Miki (ミキ)
Portrayed by: Asuka Morimura
A regular at the okama bar who Shinya falls in love with.
Tanaka Yasuyuki (田中康之)
Portrayed by: Issei Futamata
Shinya's friend, who originally dressed him as a woman.

== Media ==
=== Manga ===
Okama Report was serialized in the manga magazine Weekly Young Sunday from 1989 to 1991. It was written and illustrated by Hideo Yamamoto, and is noted as one of his sole works in the comedy genre.

Its title is a parodic reference to "Gay Report" (ゲイレポート), a report published by the LGBT rights group OCCUR that was the first large-scale survey of gay life in Japan conducted by gay men; okama is a pejorative term for gay men, particularly for those who are effeminate or who cross-dress. OCCUR protested Okama Report for containing what it argued were stereotypical and inaccurate depictions of LGBT people, particularly its failure to distinguish between gay male sexual orientation and transgender gender identity.

In response to OCCUR's criticism, publisher Shogakukan ceased publishing collected tankōbon editions of the manga, discontinuing the release of the series after two volumes. The series was subsequently printed in full twice: as five tankōbon volumes published from October 1996 to June 1997, and as three bunkobon volumes published from May to June 2009. Both the 1996 and 2009 editions contain "On how to portray male homosexuals", a postscript from OCCUR noting that the series contains exaggerated and inaccurate depictions of LGBT people.

No.	Release date	ISBN
1	April 1990 (first edition); October 1996 (second edition)	978-4091511812 (first edition); 978-4091518415 (second edition)
2	October 1990 (first edition); December 1996 (second edition)	978-4091511829 (first edition); 978-4091518422 (second edition)
3	February 1997	978-4091518439
4	April 1997	978-4091518446
5	June 1997	978-4091518453

=== Original video animation (OVA) ===
Okama Report was adapted into a three-part original video animation (OVA) produced by Toshiba EMI from 1991 to 1992.
