= High School Mystery: Gakuen Nanafushigi =

Japanese anime television series

ハイスクールミステリー 学園七不思議
- Anime television series
- Directed by: Shin Misawa
- Produced by: Hiromichi Mogaki; Minoru Wada
- Written by: Mayori Sekijima; Nobuaki Kishima; Sukehiro Tomita; Takashi Yamada
- Studio: Studio Comet
- Original network: Fuji TV
- Original run: April 12, 1991 – March 13, 1992
- Episodes: 41

High School Mystery: Gakuen Nanafushigi (ハイスクールミステリー 学園七不思議) is a Japanese anime television series based on Tsunoda Jiro's original manga titled Gakuen Seven Wonders. The series was directed by Shin Misawa and produced by Studio Comet and 41 episodes were broadcast on Fuji TV from April 12, 1991, to March 13, 1992.

== Plot ==
Mizuki Ichijo is a junior student at Kosen High School. Her grandmother was a medium and she experiences various psychic and mysterious phenomena which occur at the school: accidents, suicides, bullying, resentment, romance and more. She is befriended by the third year student Meiko Tsukikage, and together they attempt to solve the mysteries.

== Voice cast ==
Character	Voice actor	Description
Mizuki Ichijô	Michie Tomizawa	High school student with psychic powers.
Meiko Tsukikage	Chieko Honda	Third year student who befriends Mizuki to help solve mysteries at the school
