= James Bond Jr. =

American animated television series

- Based on: James Bond by Ian Fleming
- Developed by: Michael G. Wilson; Andy Heyward; Robby London
- Directed by: Bill Hutten; Tony Love
- Voices of: Jeff Bennett; Corey Burton; Julian Holloway; Mona Marshall; Brian Stokes Mitchell; Jan Rabson; Susan Silo; Simon Templeman
- Theme music composer: Dennis C. Brown; Maxine Sellers
- Composers: Dennis C. Brown; Larry Brown
- Country of origin: United States
- Original language: English
- No. of seasons: 1
- No. of episodes: 65 (list of episodes)

Production
- Executive producer: Fred Wolf
- Producers: Bill Hutten; Tony Love
- Running time: 22 minutes
- Production companies: Mac B Inc. United Artists; Murakami-Wolf-Swenson; Danjaq

Original release
- Network: Syndication
- Release: September 16 – December 13, 1991

James Bond Jr. is an American animated television series based on Ian Fleming's James Bond. Produced by Murakami-Wolf-Swenson in association with United Artists and Danjaq, the show follows the adventures of James Bond's nephew James Bond Jr. It premiered on September 16, 1991, and ran for 65 episodes before concluding on December 13. It is the first and only animated spin-off within the franchise.

== Background ==
In February 1988, Variety reported that screenwriter Kevin McClory was producing an animated series titled James Bond vs S.P.E.C.T.R.E. with an unnamed Dutch company. This series never came to fruition. EON Productions later began development on James Bond Jr. alongside Murakami-Wolf-Swenson and MGM Television. It was officially licensed by Danjaq and United Artists, the rights holders of the James Bond franchise. (McClory only had rights pertaining to Thunderball.) It was the first successful attempt to bring the series to television since the 1954 adaptation of Casino Royale.

The show features James Bond Jr., who, while attending Warfield Academy, works alongside his friends—IQ, the grandson of Q; Gordo Leiter, the son of Felix Leiter; and Tracy Milbanks—to combat the terrorist organization S.C.U.M. (Saboteurs and Criminals United in Mayhem), a group modeled after SPECTRE. His catchphrase, "Bond, James Bond... Junior", is a nod to his uncle's famous introduction.

The series often surpasses the Bond films in terms of outlandish technology, though it notably lacks the violence associated with the franchise. Several villains from the films make recurring appearances, including Jaws, Nick Nack, Julius No, Auric Goldfinger, and Oddjob. Many of the episode titles parody those of the original movies.

== Characters ==
=== Main characters ===
- James Bond Jr. (voiced by Corey Burton) is the adventurous teenage nephew of MI6 agent James Bond, 007. Like his uncle, he is known for his wit and flair for puns. He attends Warfield Academy and frequently embarks on missions to stop the criminal organization S.C.U.M. with his friends. A romantic interest is occasionally implied between him and Tracy Milbanks.
- Horace "I.Q." Boothroyd III (voiced by Jeff Bennett) is the grandson of Q. He is a close friend of James and frequently develops devices for him and his team to use during their missions. In the Italian dub of the series, he is named "Ike".
- Tracy Milbanks (voiced by Mona Marshall) is the daughter of Bradford Milbanks. She is one of James's closest friends and frequently accompanies him on missions. Her name is a reference to James Bond's late wife Tracy.
- Gordon "Gordo" Leiter (voiced by Jan Rabson) is the tanned, blonde, athletic son of CIA associate Felix Leiter. He is part of James's inner circle.
- Phoebe Farragut (voiced by Susan Silo) is the daughter of a wealthy businessman and Tracy's best friend. Throughout the show, she is open about her crush on James, though her feelings are not reciprocated. This dynamic mirrors Miss Moneypenny's relationship with Bond in the original franchise.
- Trevor Noseworthy IV (voiced by Simon Templeman) is a snobbish, egotistical student at Warfield Academy who comes from a privileged background. He frequently attempts to get James expelled. Trevor's schemes are typically petty and short-sighted, and thus consistently backfire. A future character in the James Bond universe, Alec Trevelyan, aka 006, has a similar role, but as a rogue agent attempting to stop Bond in GoldenEye.
- Bradford Milbanks (voiced by Julian Holloway) is the headmaster of Warfield Academy and the father of Tracy Milbanks. He previously worked as an RAF officer.
- Burton "Buddy" Mitchell (voiced by Brian Stokes Mitchell) is the gym teacher at Warfield Academy, a former FBI agent, and associate of Bond. He serves as a mentor to James and is often aware of his secret missions, but chooses not to interfere.

=== Villains ===
==== S.C.U.M. ====
S.C.U.M. (short for Saboteurs and Criminals United in Mayhem) is a global criminal organization that serve as the main antagonists of the series.

The major members of S.C.U.M. are listed in order of appearance:

- Scumlord (voiced by Jeff Bennett) is the leader of S.C.U.M. He operates from a dark surveillance room, always dressed in a trench coat, fedora, and sunglasses. Scumlord issues commands via telescreen and is never seen outside the shadows.
- Jaws (voiced by Jan Rabson) is a dim-witted but dangerous henchman, known for his powerful steel teeth which can chew through almost anything. Unlike his film counterpart, his lower jaw is also made of metal. He typically works with senior S.C.U.M. agents and is frequently paired with Nick Nack.
- Auric Goldfinger (voiced by Jan Rabson) is a greedy and manipulative smuggler with an obsession for gold. His survival from falling out of his airplane during his fight with 007 in Goldfinger was not explained.
  - Goldie Finger (voiced by Kath Soucie) is Goldfinger's spoiled daughter. Like her father, she is obsessed with gold and was first seen acting on her own in "City of Gold".
  - Barbella (voiced by Kath Soucie) is a bodybuilder, assassin, and henchwoman to Goldfinger and Goldie Finger.
  - Oddjob (voiced by Jeff Bennett) is a henchman who frequently works with Goldfinger. He is known for his eccentric sense of fashion. Unlike his film counterpart, Oddjob wears a metal-rimmed miniature top hat, flying goggles, a gold OJ necklace, a purple jump suit, a scarf, half-gloves, and sneakers.
- Walker D. Plank (voiced by Ed Gilbert) is a pirate with a peg leg, a hook for a hand, and an eyepatch-wearing parrot. His schemes are reminiscent of those of Karl Stromberg from the original franchise.
- Dr. No (voiced by Julian Holloway) is a nuclear physicist one of 007's most fiendish opponents. The animated version differs a lot from the film Dr. No as he has green skin, likely as a result of his defeat at the hands of 007 in the original film. No's accent, costume, and mustache have Asiatic themes and many of his schemes involve ninjas, samurai swords, and the like.
- Dr. Derange (voiced by Julian Holloway) is a mad scientist with long black hair, misaligned eyes, and a heavy French accent. He is obsessed with radioactive materials, especially plutonium.
  - Skullcap (voiced by Jan Rabson) is a high-ranking S.C.U.M. assassin and ranked 17th on INTERPOL's Most Wanted list who frequently works with Dr. Derange. He has a steel dome surgically installed over the top of his head which can conduct static electricity.
- Nick Nack (voiced by Jeff Bennett) is a henchman with dwarfism and a disproportionately large chin. He is frequently partnered with Jaws when working for any of the senior S.C.U.M. members and is often the subject of "short jokes" from the other characters.
- Baron Von Skarin (voiced by Julian Holloway) is a wealthy Bavarian baron, an international terrorist, and an arms smuggler with a monocle over his right eye. He reports directly to Scumlord and is one of his most trusted agents.
- Ms. Fortune (voiced by Susan Silo) is an aristocrat with a relentless desire for wealth and financial domination. Some of her wealth comes from owning a casino.
  - Snuffer (voiced by Jan Rabson) is Ms. Fortune's butler who assists Ms. Fortune in her missions.
- Spoiler (voiced by Michael Gough) is a gravel-voiced S.C.U.M. agent who leads a biker gang that often works under the higher S.C.U.M. operatives like Walker D. Plank and Dr. No.
- The S.C.U.M. Minions are the generic foot soldiers of S.C.U.M.

The following are minor S.C.U.M. members:

- Pharaoh Fearo is a pharaoh-themed villain and minor member of S.C.U.M. He appeared in "Shifting Sands", where he plotted to take over Egypt. Fearo would later appear in the accompanying John Vincent novelization Sandblast.
  - Viper is a cousin of Pharaoh Fearo who assisted him in his campaign to take over Egypt by posing as the Mummy of Pharaoh Hiphurrah. He would later appear in the accompanying John Vincent novelization Sandblast.
- Felony O'Toole is an actress and minor member of S.C.U.M. She appeared in "Location: Danger" where she was sent to abduct Professor Braintrust.
- Mask is a minor member of S.C.U.M. and a master of disguise who uses cloaking technology. He appeared in "Hostile Takeover" where he took on the alias of temporary principal William Baxter when infiltrating Warfield Academy.
- Tiara Hotstones (voiced by Kath Soucie) is a jewel thief and mercenary who once worked for S.C.U.M. She appeared in "Rubies Aren't Forever" where she targeted the necklace worn by her niece Ruby.
  - Crowbar is the minion of Tiara Hotstones.

==== Other villains ====
- The Chameleon (voiced by Alan Oppenheimer) is a shapeshifting villain who can alter his appearance using subdermal nanotechnology. While he worked with Dr. Derange on one occasion, he is not affiliated with S.C.U.M.
- The Worm (voiced by Jan Rabson) is the only villain in the series unaffiliated with S.C.U.M. and is known for his fear of sunlight and preference for underground lairs.
- Maximillion Cotex (voiced by Jan Rabson) is a large-headed criminal who is unaffiliated with S.C.U.M.

== Episodes ==
Season	Episodes	Originally released	
Season	Episodes	First released	Last released
1	65	September 16, 1991	December 13, 1991

== Physical releases ==
=== Home media ===
Most episodes of James Bond Jr. were only broadcast on television and never made commercially available. On April 1, 1992, eight different single-episode VHS tapes were released in the United States. The following year, six multi-episode tapes were released in the United Kingdom.

=== Books ===
In 1992, Puffin Books released six novels based on James Bond Jr. They were written by John Peel under the pseudonym John Vincent. A year later, Buzz Books published a separate series of books adapted from the television show by Caryl Jenner. These were significantly shorter and geared towards a younger audience.

=== Marvel Comics ===
James Bond Jr. was adapted into a limited comic series by Marvel Comics between January and December 1992. While the first issues were direct adaptations of episodes from the television show, the remaining seven featured original stories. They were written by Cal Hamilton and Dan Abnett and illustrated by Mario Capaldi, Colin Fawcett, Adolfo Buylla, and Bambos Georgioli.

=== Video games ===
Two James Bond Jr. video games were released: a platformer for the NES developed by Eurocom and an action game by Gray Matter. Both were published in 1992 by THQ and received mixed-to-negative reviews. The NES version originally started out as John Smith, Special Agent, intended to be published by Taxan, and the SNES version originally started out as a port of the NES game Captain Planet and the Planeteers, intended to be published by Mindscape.

== See also ==
- Young Bond
- Alex Rider
- Jimmy Coates
- CHERUB
- Henderson's Boys
- Cody Banks
- Spy School
- Outline of James Bond
- Jonny Quest
