= Sweet Spot (manga) =

Japanese manga series

- First volume cover

スイートスポット
- Genre: Sports (golf)
- Created by: Yutsuko Chūsonji
- Manga
- Written by: Yutsuko Chūsonji
- Published by: Fusosha
- Magazine: SPA!
- Original run: 1989 – 1992
- Original video animation
- Directed by: Gisaburō Sugii
- Written by: Gisaburō Sugii
- Studio: Fuji TV, Group TAC, Pony Canyon
- Released: April 21, 1991
- Runtime: 45 minutes

Sweet Spot (Japanese: スイートスポット) is a Japanese manga series written and illustrated by Yutsuko Chūsonji. Originally serialized in the magazine SPA! from 1989 to 1992, the series follows an office lady (OL) with a passion for golf. The series is credited with originating the slang term oyaji gal (オヤジギャル; literally "old man gal"), used to describe young businesswomen who have interests and hobbies stereotypically associated with middle-aged businessmen. In 1991, Sweet Spot was adapted into an original video animation (OVA) directed by Gisaburō Sugii.

== Synopsis ==
Set against the backdrop of bubble-era Tokyo, Sweet Spot follows the life of Oyamada Non, a 23-year-old office lady. Oyamada and the women who work at her office are oyaji gals: women who have a passion for activities generally associated with middle-aged men, such as golf, karaoke, and horse betting.

== Media ==
=== Manga ===
Sweet Spot was serialized in the magazine SPA! from 1989 to 1992. It was published as eight tankōbon (collected editions) by Fusosha Publishing:

No.	Release date	ISBN
1	November 1989	978-4594005061
2	April 1990	978-4594005634
3	July 1990	978-4594006129
4	January 1991	978-4594006822
5	April 1991	978-4594007102
6	October 1991	978-4594008093
7	April 1992	978-4594009137
8	September 1992	978-4594009137

=== Original video animation ===
An original video animation (OVA) adaptation of Sweet Spot, directed by Gisaburō Sugii and produced by Fuji TV, Group TAC, and Pony Canyon, was released on April 21, 1991. All of the characters in the OVA are voiced by news presenters for Fuji TV, with the exception of Oyamada, who is voiced by actress Yumi Morio.

== Impact ==
Sweet Spot originated the Japanese slang term oyaji gal (オヤジギャル; literally "old man gal"), used to describe upwardly-mobile young businesswomen who have interests and hobbies stereotypically associated with middle-aged businessmen. The Los Angeles Times noted in 1991 that the oyaji gal was "the latest figure in the evolution of Japanese women that has seen the 'body-con' or body conscious woman with hip-hugging clothes; the giggling burriko, whose hallmark is everything cute, and the 'O. L.,' or office lady, who serves tea and makes photocopies while waiting for Mr. Right." In his book Japan in the 21st Century, academic Pradyumna Karan cites Sweet Spot as an example of the "perception gap between the sexes" in Japan during the bubble era, in the way that it "pokes fun at workaholic men and salutes the leisurely attitudes of young female workers."
