= Vampire Wars =

Japanese original video animation

ヴァンパイヤー戦争 (Vanpaiyaa Sensou)
- Genre: Supernatural, Vampire
- Original video animation
- Directed by: Kazuhisa Takenouchi
- Written by: Hiroyuki Hoshiyama
- Music by: Kazuhiko Toyama
- Studio: Toei Animation
- Licensed by: UK: Manga Entertainment
- Released: January 25, 1991
- Runtime: 50 minutes

Vampire Wars (ヴァンパイヤー戦争, Vanpaiyā Sensō) is an original video animation based on a novel series by Kiyoshi Kasai and published by Kadokawa Shoten, produced by Toei Animation and directed by Kazuhisa Takenouchi.

== Cast ==
Character	Original Version	English Dub
Kuki Kosaburo	Masashi Sugawara	Roger May
Milcea Millere	Shuuichi Ikeda	
Kiki/Lamia	Yuka Koyama	Julia Brahms
Bellboy	Hikaru Midorikawa	
Muraki	Kaneto Shiozawa	
Mirucha	Masaru Ikeda	Peter Marinker
Charlie Milan	Takeshi Aono	
Newscaster		Peter Marinker
George Lazare	Toshiya Ueda	Frank Rozelaar-Green
Brigit	Yūko Mita	Sarah Wateridge

== Media ==
=== Novels ===
The first volume was published in 1982 and it ran up to 11 volumes. Artwork in the original printing was handled by Hiroyuki Kitazume, while the reprint was made by Takashi Takeuchi.

=== Anime ===
Vampire Wars was broadcast in United States on May 5, 2008 and in Canada by Super Channel on December 1, 2008.

The OVA is licensed in the US and United Kingdom by Manga Entertainment. Manga Entertainment released a DVD of the Vampire Wars OVA on June 25, 2002.
