= List of animated television series of 1972 =

A list of animated television series first aired in 1972.

Animated television series first aired in 1972
Title	Episodes	Country	Year	Notes	Technique
The ABC Saturday Superstar Movie	20	United States	1972–73		Traditional
The Adventures of Sir Prancelot	31	United Kingdom	1972		Traditional
Akado Suzunosuke	52	Japan	1972–73		Anime
The Amazing Chan and the Chan Clan	16	United States	1972	Based on Charlie Chan novels and films.	Traditional
Anime Document Munchen E No Michi	16	Japan	1972		Anime
Arago X-001	26	France	1972–73		Traditional
Around the World in Eighty Days	16	Australia	1972–73		Traditional
Astroganger	26	Japan	1972–73		Anime
Au Clair de Lune	26	France	1972		Traditional
The Barkleys	13	United States	1972	inspired by All in the Family	Traditional
The Brady Kids	22	United States	1972–73	Spin-off of The Brady Bunch and The ABC Saturday Superstar Movie	Traditional
Cantinflas Show	52	Mexico	1972		Traditional
Chappy the Witch	39	Japan	1972		Anime
Devilman	39	Japan	1972–73		Anime
Fat Albert and the Cosby Kids	110	United States	1972–85	Based on the childhood and friend of Bill Cosby and his brother.	Traditional
Festival of Family Classics	20	United States	1972–73		Traditional
Fingerbobs	13	United Kingdom	1972		Stop-Motion
The Flintstone Comedy Hour	18	United States	1972–73	Spin-off of The Flintstones and The Pebbles and Bamm-Bamm Show	Traditional
Frakk, the Cats' Nightmare	52	Hungary	1972–87		Traditional
The Gutsy Frog	103	Japan	1972–74		Anime
Hazedon	26	Japan	1972–73		Anime
The Houndcats	13	United States	1972		Traditional
Josie and the Pussycats in Outer Space	16	United States	1972–74	Spin-off of Josie and the Pussycats	Traditional
Kid Power	17	United States	1972–73	Based on Wee Pals comic strip	Traditional
Larry the Lamb	26	United Kingdom	1972–74		Stop-Motion
Lassie's Rescue Rangers	16	United States	1972–73	Spin-off of Lassie and The ABC Saturday Superstar Movie	Traditional
Mahōtsukai Chappy	39	Japan	1972		Anime
Mazinger Z	92	Japan	1972–74		Anime
The Merrie Melodies Show	24	United States	1972		Traditional
Mon Chéri CoCo	13	Japan	1972		Anime
The Most Important Person	66	United States	1972		Traditional
The Mouse Factory	43	United States	1972–73		Traditional
New Moomin	52	Japan	1972		Anime
The New Scooby-Doo Movies	24	United States	1972–73	Spin-off of Scooby-Doo, Where Are You!	Traditional
O makové panence	13	Czechoslovakia	1972–73		Traditional
Onbu Obake	52	Japan	1972–73		Anime
The Osmonds	17	United States	1972	Based on the popular boy band	Traditional
Pinocchio: The Series	52	Japan	1972		Anime
Przygody kota Filemona	39	Poland	1972–81		Traditional
The Roman Holidays	13	United States	1972		Traditional
Science Ninja Team Gatchaman	105	Japan	1972–74		Anime
Sealab 2020	13	United States	1972		Traditional
Seigi wo Ai Suru Mono - Gekkō Kamen	39	Japan	1972		Anime
Tamagon the Counselor	195	Japan	1972–73		Anime
Triton of the Sea	27	Japan	1972		Anime
Victor et Horace	26	France	1972		Stop-motion
Wait Till Your Father Gets Home	48	United States	1972–74	Prime time animated sitcom	Traditional
The Wonderful Stories of Professor Kitzel	105	United States	1972		Traditional

== See also ==
- List of animated feature films of 1972
- List of Japanese animation television series of 1972
