= List of animated feature films of 1972 =

This is a list of animated feature films first released in 1972.

== List ==
Title	Country	Director	Production company	Animation technique	Format	Notes	Release date	Duration
The Adventures of Pinocchio; Un burattino di nome Pinocchio (A Puppet Named Pinocchio)	Italy	Giuliano Cenci	Cartoons Cinematografica Italiana; Artfilm Distribuzione	Traditional	Theatrical		December 21, 1972	93 minutes
The Adventures of Robin Hoodnik	United States	Joseph Barbera; William Hanna	Hanna-Barbera	Traditional	Television film		November 4, 1972	45 minutes
The Amlash Enchanted Forest היער הקסום (Ha'Ya'ar Ha-Kasum)	Israel	Shlomo Suriano	Amlash Production	Traditional	Theatrical		June 1974	71 minutes
Anteojito and Antifaz: A Thousand Attempts and One Invention; Anteojito y Antifaz, mil intentos y un invento	Argentina	Manuel García Ferré	Producciones García Ferré	Traditional	Theatrical		September 14, 1972	80 minutes
The Banana Splits in Hocus Pocus Park	United States	Charles A. Nichols; Tom Boutross	Hanna-Barbera	Traditional/Live action	Television film Live-action animated film		November 25, 1972	44 minutes
The Brady Kids on Mysterious Island	United States	Hal Sutherland	Filmation; Paramount Television	Traditional	Television special Live-action animated film	Pilot film of the animated television series The Brady Kids (1972–1973).	September 9, 1972	60 minutes
Daffy Duck and Porky Pig Meet the Groovie Goolies	United States	Hal Sutherland	Filmation; Warner Bros. Television Distribution	Traditional/Live action	Television film Live-action animated film	Crossover special of the animation franchise Looney Tunes and the television series Groovie Goolies (1970–1972).	December 16, 1972	60 minutes
The Enchanted World of Danny Kaye: The Emperor's New Clothes	United States; Denmark; Japan	Arthur Rankin Jr. Jules Bass	Rankin/Bass; Video Tokyo Production	Stop motion/Live action	Television special		February 21, 1972	50 minutes
Fritz the Cat	United States	Ralph Bakshi	Aurica Finance Company; Black Ink; Fritz Productions; Krantz Films	Traditional	Theatrical	The first film directed by Ralph Bakshi, and the first adult animated feature to be produced and released in the United States; originally rated X, rating surrendered by MGM for unrated home video release.	April 12, 1972	80 minutes
Gidget Makes the Wrong Connection	United States		Hanna-Barbera; Screen Gems	Traditional	Television film		November 18, 1972	60 minutes
Go Get Them 0011 魔犬ライナー0011変身せよ! (Maken Liner 0011 Henshin Seyo!)	Japan	Takeshi Tamiya	Toei Animation	Traditional	Theatrical		July 16, 1972	50 minutes
Grimy's Tales (Erotische Zeichentrickfilm Parade)	West Germany; United States	Richard Meintz; Hubert Mentel	Amor Film; Love Film Produktion; Marketing Film Videofex	Traditional	Theatrical		1972	59 minutes
Journey Back to Oz	United States	Hal Sutherland	Filmation; ABC	Traditional	Theatrical		December 14, 1972	88 minutes
Lassie and the Spirit of Thunder Mountain	United States	Hal Sutherland	Filmation; Paramount Television	Traditional	Television special	Pilot film of the animated television series Lassie's Rescue Rangers (1972–1973).	November 11, 1972	60 minutes
Last of the Curlews	United States	Joseph Barbera; William Hanna	Hanna-Barbera	Traditional	Television special	Originally aired as the first installment of the ABC anthology television series ABC Afterschool Special (1972–1997).	October 4, 1972	60 minutes
Mad Mad Mad Monsters	United States; Japan	Jules Bass; Arthur Rankin Jr.	Rankin/Bass; Mushi Production	Traditional	Television film		September 23, 1972	43 minutes
Marco Polo Junior Versus the Red Dragon	Australia; United States	Eric Porter	Animation International Inc. Porter Animations	Traditional	Theatrical	First Australian animated theatrical feature.	December 1, 1972	82 minutes
Nanny and the Professor	United States		Fred Calvert Productions; 20th Century-Fox Television	Traditional	Television film		September 30, 1972	60 minutes
Oliver and the Artful Dodger	United States	Joseph Barbera; William Hanna	Hanna-Barbera	Traditional	Television film	Originally broadcast as a two-part special.	October 21–28, 1972	90 minutes
Popeye Meets the Man Who Hated Laughter	United States	Hal Seeger; Jack Zander	Hal Seeger Productions; King Features Syndicate	Traditional	Television film		October 7, 1972	60 minutes
The Prince and the Pauper	Australia	Chris Cuddington	Air Programs International	Traditional	Television film	Originally aired as the 8th installment of the CBS animated anthology series Famous Classic Tales (1970–1984).	November 26, 1972	60 minutes
The Red Baron	United States	Arthur Rankin Jr. Jules Bass	Rankin/Bass	Traditional	Television film		December 9, 1972	60 minutes
Robinson Crusoe	Australia	Leif Gram	Air Programs International	Traditional	Television film	Originally aired as the 7th installment of the CBS animated anthology series Famous Classic Tales (1970–1984).	November 23, 1972	47 minutes
Snoopy Come Home	United States	Bill Melendez	United Feature Syndicate; Lee Mendelson Films; Cinema Center Films; National General Pictures	Traditional	Theatrical	Second feature film in the Peanuts franchise, and the last to be distributed by National General Pictures. This film, an unexpected box office failure, was considered the cause of the demise of Cinema Center Films.	August 9, 1972	80 minutes
Superstar Goofy	United States	Jack Hannah; Jack King; Jack Kinney; Wolfgang Reitherman	Walt Disney Productions	Traditional	Theatrical; Anthology film	Film compiled from Disney theatrical animated shorts; originally released theatrically for overseas markets and never in the United States until July 25, 1976.	June 21, 1972	74 minutes
Tabitha and Adam and the Clown Family	United States		Hanna-Barbera; Screen Gems	Traditional	Television film		December 2, 1972	60 minutes
The Three Musketeers in Boots; Nagagutsu Sanjūshi	Japan	Tomoharu Katsumata	Toei Animation	Traditional	Theatrical	Sequel to The Wonderful World of Puss 'n Boots (1969).	March 18, 1972	53 minutes
Tintin and the Lake of Sharks; Tintin et le lac aux requins	Belgium; France	Raymond Leblanc	Belvision Studios	Traditional	Theatrical	The third animated feature film in The Adventures of Tintin franchise, and the third to be an completely original story and screenplay.	December 13, 1972	71 minutes
Travels of Marco Polo	Australia	Leif Gram	Air Programs International	Traditional	Television film	Originally aired as the 6th installment of the CBS animated anthology series Famous Classic Tales (1970–1984).	January 1, 1972	60 minutes
The War of Great Monsters 괴수대전쟁 (Koesu Taejonjaeng)	South Korea	Yongyusu	Segi Trading Co., Ltd.	Traditional	Theatrical		December 23, 1972	69 minutes
Willie Mays and the Say-Hey Kid	United States	Arthur Rankin Jr. Jules Bass	Rankin/Bass	Traditional	Television film		October 14, 1972	60 minutes
Yogi's Ark Lark	United States	Joseph Barbera; William Hanna	Hanna-Barbera	Traditional	Television film	Pilot film of the animated television series Yogi's Gang (1973).	September 16, 1972	45 minutes

== See also ==
- List of animated television series of 1972
