= List of Science Ninja Team Gatchaman episodes =

This article is a list of episodes from the television show Science Ninja Team Gatchaman in order by air date.

== Episode list ==
No.	Title	Original release date
1	"Gatchaman Versus Turtle King"; Transliteration: "Gatchaman Tai Tātoru Kingu" (Japanese: ガッチャマン対タートル・キング)	October 1, 1972
A huge turtle-shaped mecha, the "Turtle King", attacks a uranium storage facility. The International Science Organization (ISO) and the delegates of various countries are very concerned. Nambu, the only person who previously knew of Galactor, now officially announces the existence of both this criminal organization and the Science Ninja Team that has been formed to defeat it. The Science Ninja Team receives Nambu's orders, unites in the "God Phoenix", and flies off right away to a missile-launching base where the mecha was sighted. Ken stops Joe, who's eager to get into his first real fight. Ken takes Jun along and they sneak inside the mecha. With Ken's help, the God Phoenix then enters the mecha, and Joe, Jinpei, and Ryu join the battle against the Galactor members. Elsewhere, the commander of the mecha tells Bergu Kattse, the second-in-command of Galactor, of the Science Ninja Team's existence. He then relays the message to Sosai X, a supernatural being who leads the criminal organization. In accordance with X's instructions, Kattse orders the Science Ninja Team to be destroyed, which is to have the mecha make a suicidal plunge, taking the God Phoenix with it, thus burying the Science Ninja Team. But at the very last moment, the God Phoenix escapes the mecha by using the Firebird Effect, melting the enemy ship.
2	"The Monstrous Aircraft Carrier Appears"; Transliteration: "Ma no Obake Kūbo Arawaru" (Japanese: 魔のお化け空母現わる)	October 8, 1972
A spaceship disappears, along with a device that can report and record the location of the Earth's resources. The Science Ninja Team receives Nambu's instructions and heads toward the bottom of the sea, in the vicinity of the spot where contact with a spaceship was lost. There, shrimp-shaped bulldozers leave a huge aircraft carrier located on the sea bottom to build a uranium factory. Ken stops Ryu, who wants to fire a bird missile and sneaks into the aircraft carrier alone. Ken discovers the spaceship's capsule inside the aircraft carrier, but the astronauts who were on board have been taken hostage. Ken attempts to rescue them, however, in reality, the pilots were already murdered. Showing them as if they were still alive was a trap. Jinpei sneaks into the aircraft carrier, following Ken on Joe's orders. He is able to rescue Ken as he is being led underground. The two of them collect the device and escape, destroying the computer in the aircraft carrier. The commander of the carrier gets blamed by Kattse for the failure of the operation, and he gets into the head of the Turtle King to hurl himself at the God Phoenix. But because of Ken's quick thinking, the God Phoenix becomes the Firebird, and the flames consume everything.
3	"The Giant Mummy that Summons Storms"; Transliteration: "Arashi wo Yobu Mīra Kyojin" (Japanese: 嵐を呼ぶミイラ巨人)	October 15, 1972
Deadly crashes involving passenger planes keep occurring. Ken, who's investigating these occurrences, encounters a boy named Makoto, who is awaiting the return of his father who was reported missing in one of the accidents. Makoto's father is the younger brother of Dr. Takahara, the inventor of "uranless", a new element. It is found that the string of plane crashes were caused by Galactor, which is intent on getting the uranless, since it is capable of neutralizing the means of propulsion of their giant mummy. Ken encountered the mummy in his Cessna before, and because of that incident, he has data concerning the propulsion system of the mummy. He contacts Dr. Takahara in order to get the uranless. He meets Makoto's father, who miraculously survived the crash, but it's really Berugu Kattse in disguise, who battles with Ken and escapes. Makoto blames Ken for torturing his father, and Ken promises to bring back his father—whereupon he gets the pin hiding the uranless. The giant mummy appears at the airport, and Ken is able to defeat it by firing the uranless into it. But Makoto watches Kattse, still in the guise of his father, flee in an escape rocket. He accuses Ken of breaking his promise to bring his father back. Ken accepts Makoto's hate silently, since he lost his own father 10 years ago in a similar way and has had the same thoughts—namely that his father would return some day.
4	"Revenge on the Iron Beast Mechadegon"; Transliteration: "Tetsu jū Mekadegon ni Fukushū da" (Japanese: 鉄獣メカデゴンに復しゅうだ)	October 22, 1972
During the investigation of an incident, Ken visits the Institute for Earthquake Research. Because of an earthquake caused by a mecha, he falls along with the director of the institute, Nakahara, into a crevice in the Earth. Ken transmutes and is saved, but he cannot rescue Nakahara. Ken stands before the director's grave and is attacked by Naomi Nakahara, the director's daughter, who firmly believes he's a member of Galactor. Ken understands her anger at not being able to avenge her father and decides to let her know about his true identity as member of the Science Ninja Team. Consequently, he lets her join the team on its mission. In an investigation, it was determined which resources the mecha will most likely attack next, and the God Phoenix encounters the mecha at a base. Inside, Ken wants to let Naomi avenge her father and asks Dr. Nambu for permission to fire the bird missiles. Nambu doesn't give permission, but Ken ignores him and tells Naomi to fire the bird missiles anyway. Naomi hesitates to press the firing button, and Ken takes Naomi's hand and makes her fire the missiles. At the director's grave, Ken hands his bracelet to Nambu. He says he wants to take the responsibility for making Naomi press the firing button without permission and resign from the team. However, Nambu says that Ken is needed for world peace and Naomi promises not to reveal his true identity.
5	"The Ghost Fleet From Hell"; Transliteration: "Jigoku no Yūrei Kantai" (Japanese: 地獄の幽霊艦隊)	October 29, 1972
Ocean-going ships from the ISO keep disappearing. It always happens in the vicinity of a place called the Cemetery of the Sea. Director Andāson and Nambu ask the Science Ninja Team to go to a base on the ocean floor that is most likely to be struck next. The Science Ninja Team gets Nambu's message and takes the God Phoenix toward the base at the bottom of the sea. Then the team encounters a mysterious submarine, which leads them to the Cemetery of the Sea, where they see countless sunken ships. But when Joe says that all the ships are actually battleships, Ken gets suspicious and has the God Phoenix surface. There's fog everywhere on the surface, and from the middle of the fog, a ghost fleet attacks the team, but they guess correctly that the fog is man-made. The team destroys the device that's creating the fog, but from the ghost fleet appear countless disks that attack them using light rays. The Science Ninja Team has to fight a hard battle. Just when all the missiles are used up and they don't know what to do, three red planes appear and shoot down the enemy machines using superior flying techniques. The commander of the fighter plane unit introduces himself to the baffled Science Ninja Team as Red Impulse. He then flies away, leaving the words "we'll meet again" behind.
6	"The Great Mini-Robot Operation"; Transliteration: "Mini Robotto Dai Sakusen" (Japanese: ミニ・ロボット大作戦)	November 5, 1972
Gold bars are stolen from the vault of the World Bank. It is the deed of Galactor's Mini Robots. The Science Ninja Team gets its instructions and starts a search on the islands in the vicinity of the place where gold bars seem to have been taken. Joe makes sure that Ken, Jun, and Jinpei, in civilian wear, attract the enemy's attention and get taken off to the base. He proposes that if this is the headquarters, it should be destroyed right away. However, Nambu stops him by saying it's not the Science Ninja Team's duty to attack. Joe leaves a bored Ryu behind in the God Phoenix on the bottom of the sea and sneaks into the base in order to prepare for retaking of the gold bars. While Ken and the other create a lot of confusion in the interior of the base, Joe goes looking for the gold bars. He learns that a missile is about to be fired at the God Phoenix when it is detected by the surveillance cameras. He contacts Ryu in the God Phoenix immediately Ryu, who is always on stand-by, is taking a nap, although he manages to evade the missile by a hair's breadth. With Joe's guidance, they store the stolen gold bars in the God Phoenix's interior. Ken and the others are contacted and escape from the base. Galactor destroys the base and all its inhabitants because of the missing gold bars.
7	"Galactor's Giant Airshow"; Transliteration: "Gyarakutā no Dai Kōkū Shō" (Japanese: ギャラクターの大航空ショー)	November 12, 1972
There's a new kind of plane that does not pollute the environment. In the middle of Ken's test flight of this ISO-developed plane, he is attacked by a biplane, piloted by a man who introduces himself as Katzen Berugu, who lashes his whip at the ISO plane, which causes it to crash, but Ken saves himself just in time by deploying a parachute. Nambu suspects from the name that Galactor is involved and orders the God Phoenix to attack immediately, but the ship's tail fin is damaged by the whip. Analysis of the material stuck in the hull of the God Phoenix reveals that this kind of metal, called whisker, is something that was researched by the ISO but not manufactured. Nambu is taken aback at the scientific power of Galactor, but when the production factory is discovered, he gives the Science Ninja Team the order to destroy it. While the Science Ninja Team conducts a search with the God Phoenix in a mining area, it detects a huge mine. When the team discovers that this is where Galactor's secret factory is located, its members sneak into it. By the end of the battle, they have succeeded in destroying the computer and a nuclear reactor. The team try to make its getaway in the God Phoenix but are caught by the strong magnetic attraction of the mine. The team switches to jet propulsion and escapes narrowly, leaving the exploding factory behind.
8	"The Secret of the Crescent Coral Reef"; Transliteration: "Mikazuki no Sangoshō no Himitsu" (Japanese: 三日月のサンゴ礁の秘密)	November 19, 1972
In order to resist its terrible enemy, Nambu thinks about building a base for the Science Ninja Team. But fearing enemy intervention, he gives the Ninja Team orders to fly a patrol at Point G in the southern Pacific Ocean. Following orders not to intervene there, the God Phoenix leaves a smoke screen and flees when it encounters a sea anemone mecha. That night, Jinpei is with the other four team members, but he is not tired at all. He takes the G-4 and dives to the bottom of the sea. Children in a park told him that G-4's popularity is the lowest of all the team members, and he intends on gaining their favor by being the best. Despite the worries of the other team members, he wanders around the sea bottom searching for the mecha. He never notices that he is being tailed by the very mecha that he seeks. Jinpei finds what seems to be a base under construction but is caught by the mecha. He contacts Ken, but the base is blown up before his eyes. The mecha is destroyed by the God Phoenix, and Kattse gets away again. Jinpei complains that the base has been blown up because of his own selfish actions, but Nambu tells him that the destroyed base was only a decoy. The Science Ninja Team was the bait to attract the enemy's attention. The God Phoenix is flying high in the sky. Down below stretches a crescent-shaped coral reef. The base is hidden below the reef, which is capable of changing its location.
9	"The Devil from the Moon"; Transliteration: "Tsuki Yori no Akuma" (Japanese: 月よりの悪魔)	November 26, 1972
In the deep black sky, the blue-white moon is shining. Suddenly, a meteorite falls down to Earth. According to analysis, the meteorite has the same composition as the moon. So Ken proposes approaching the moon in the God Phoenix to investigate. Approaching the moon, the God Phoenix encounters a swarm of meteorites heading for Earth. Ken discovers a wrapped-up body in the middle of the swarm and, because this is not a meteorite, he attacks. But bird missiles have no effect. The body falls to the Earth, becomes a scorpion-shaped mecha, and attacks an oil refinery. Following Nambu's instructions from Earth to find the source of the radio waves steering the mecha and the meteorites, Ken asks Jun to trace the signal they detected while the mecha was on its way to Earth. The Science Ninja Team find the carrier sending out the control signal and leaves Ryu behind in the God Phoenix while they sneak inside the mecha. The other members question the commander, but he doesn't reveal anything. Joe loses his patience and fires carelessly into the control panels with a machine gun. Shortly after the Science Ninja Team escapes, the meteorites hit the carrier because the computer was destroyed. Meanwhile on Earth, the Reddo Imparusu squad reports that the now-unguided scorpion mecha has been destroyed.
10	"The Great Underground Monster War"; Transliteration: "Chitei Kaijū Dai Sensō" (Japanese: 地底怪獣大戦争)	December 3, 1972
Suddenly, a whole city has lost power. Ken, in his Cessna, is thinking about an anomaly in the power plant when he gets a message from Nambu that the nuclear power plant has been attacked by a large group of ants. The Science Ninja Team goes to the site in question, but since the missiles would have hardly any effect on the tiny groups, the team washes them away by breaking a nearby dam and using the force of the water. Upon analyzing an ant the team brought back to the base, it learns that it's a finely and precisely manufactured robot. The robot ant gets repaired and, following its control signal, returns to its base. It is followed by Ryu in the God Phoenix in the sky and by the other four on the ground. They soon discover huge ant-hills and end up in a huge ant cave when they try to sneak inside. Kattse is waiting for them where they fall and are captured in a dome made of reinforced glass. The air is about to run out, and they don't know what to do, but in the end, the team barely escapes by using a bomb. In the meantime, swarms of ants have attacked the streets, but the Reddo Imparusu squad exterminates them with flamethrowers. At this time, Kattse lets a huge ant-shaped mecha take off. Reddo Imparus and the God Phoenix drive the ant mecha into an underwater tunnel. Collecting the sunlight with a mirror built into its nose, the God Phoenix burns everything with a strong heat ray, but Kattse gets escapes.
11	"The Mysterious Red Impulse"; Transliteration: "Nazo no Reddo Inparusu" (Japanese: 謎のレッド・インパルス)	December 10, 1972
While flying, Ken is surprised to encounter the plane of the Red Impulse commander. He pursues him, but Red Impulse gets away using some superb flying technique; Ken longs to be able to use similar techniques. The Science Ninja Team gets order to guard the super powerful plane "Blue Hawk", pride of the country Toritan. But the crew of the plane has been killed before take-off and replaced with Galactor members. Nambu learns of this situation after take-off. He mobilizes Red Impulse in order to protect the Science Ninja Team from the Blue Hawk, since it is more powerful than the God Phoenix. The God Phoenix continues to accompany the Blue Hawk without knowing the situation on-board. Red Impulse appears, attacking the Blue Hawk and, after shooting a timebomb into it, disappears again. Ken sees that and firmly believes that Red Impulse is actually an enemy. Ignoring Nambu who wants to stop him, he pursues Red Impulse alone in the G-1. While Ken is away, the other four members get abducted and taken to a base located in a volcano. Ken however, follows Red Impulse, who in turn is following the signal emitted by the time bomb. They arrive together and save the team just before they're executed. Nambu tells them that Red Impulse is a friend battling on their side. The G-1 and the Red Impulse plane fly through the sky wing-to-wing, reminiscent of bird parents flying with their children. Nobody at the time knows the meaning of the tear appearing in the Red Impulse commander's eye.
12	"The Gluttonous Monster Ibukron"; Transliteration: "Ōgui Kaijū Ibukuron" (Japanese: 大喰い怪獣イブクロン)	December 17, 1972
The world's raw material for sugar gets stolen by the Galactor mecha, Ibukuron, and the world emergency sugar is getting very low. Ryu and Jinpei rush out into the street to buy candies. Just then, they get the order from Nambu to move out in order to follow Ibukuron and find the secret base. During the pursuit, the God Phoenix gets drawn toward the mecha by its strong magnetic force it uses to suck in the raw materials. Ken uses this force to sneak into the interior of the mecha, along with Joe and Ryu. However, the interior turns out to be a sugar factory and the three team members get sucked into the production process. They almost fall into a huge cooking pot filled with seething raw material, but somehow manage to escape. But then they enter a centrifuge and are rendered completely helpless. Meanwhile, Ibukuron has arrived at the base in a snow mountain and Jun and Jinpei sneak into its nuclear energy chamber. They turn off the power source, but get caught by the enemy. With the power turned off, Ken and the others can escape and arrive to rescue them. Just before escaping, Jun installs a time bomb and, as a result, the base disappears in the middle of an avalanche. The Science Ninja Team distributes the sugar, which they won back from Ibukuron, in a park. The children are now happy again.
13	"The Mysterious Red Sand"; Transliteration: "Nazo no Akai Suna" (Japanese: 謎の赤い砂)	December 24, 1972
An ISO constructed storage lake, which is part of a plan to make the desert fertile, disappears. The Science Ninja Team flies to Africa to investigate. An Elder there tells them the legend of the moving red sand. It is said that the red sand burns forever and that it can make civilizations grow, as well as destroy them. Ken asks the Elder about the sand's secret, but the Elder doesn't tell anything. Jinpei, following the Elder who's about to get abducted by Galactor, finds a pendant. The red sand contained in its interior is sent to Nambu and the analysis reveals that it's a new sort of bacteria and also a previously undiscovered powerful energy source. It has a thousand times the force of uranium and, if water is added, splits up and causes a big explosion. Because Galactor is looking for the red sand, a lion ant mecha changes the lake's location via an underground channel. The God Phoenix dives deep underground, discovers the caves used by the mecha and sneaks into the base they discover. But Galactor learns of the Science Ninja Team's arrival and they shoot the Elder after he reveals the secret. They head to the location where the red sand is locked up, one step ahead of the Science Ninja Team. Before dying, the Elder tells the Science Ninja Team the location as well. The God Phoenix gets there too late, the red sand is already stolen by the mecha. As a last resort, the God Phoenix turns toward the mecha as the Fiery Phoenix. As the red sand is touched by the flames, Galactor's high ambitions are burned, together with the sand.
14	"The Fearsome Ice-Kander"; Transliteration: "Kyōfu no Aisu Kyandā" (Japanese: 恐怖のアイスキャンダー)	December 31, 1972
It is reported that all kind of nuclear ships (cruise ships, submarines, battle ships, etc.) are disappearing. The disappearance is the result of the Galactor mecha Icecander, aiming at nuclear energy. While investigating these incidents, the Science Ninja Team gets a message that a suspicious iceberg is moving forward against the current of the sea. The God Phoenix follows the iceberg, going to the north pole, where they discover a base in the middle of icebergs. Ken and Jun sneak into the base. In the base, while they are trying to take out the nuclear reactor, an operation is performed, designed to convert the crew and the passengers of the ships into Galactor members. With this strategy, Galactor wants to gain nuclear energy and new members at the same time. Just at this moment, Katse wants to perform the operation on a small girl, a passenger on one of the cruise ships. Ken and Jun invade the room and stop the operation, but Katse locks them up and leaves a time bomb in the room. In this instance, an old man in a wheelchair, who was on the same ship as the little girl, takes the time bomb in his arms and sacrifices himself, saving the others from the explosion. Ken and the others exit the operation room. First they free the abducted passengers and let them get back on board, then they blow up the base and escape. The Icecander pursues them, but the God Phoenix encounters it using the fiery phoenix and the mecha goes up in flames.
15	"The Fearsome Jellyfish Lens"; Transliteration: "Kyōfu no Kurage Renzu" (Japanese: 恐怖のクラゲレンズ)	January 7, 1973
The town Ghost City has been destroyed 10 years earlier by environmental pollution. Communication with an investigation team sending data from there is lost. The Science Ninja Team goes there in the God Phoenix, which uses a soft skin (membrane) to protect it against the pollution. But as soon as they enter the city, they meet a Galactor attack. As it turns out, there's a base here. Nambu orders the U.N. military forces to attack. It seems everything is cleared after the attack. In reality however, a jellyfish lens created by Sosai X continues to grow at the bottom of the sea near the city. It uses the polluted sea water as its amniotic fluid. After finishing its growth, the jellyfish lens which turns the sunlight into energy a few hundred times stronger, completely destroys fighter planes from the U.N. forces. It then starts to attack the cities on Earth. The God Phoenix dives into the sea near the city and discovers the base and the hiding jellyfish lens. They attack with missiles, but even though they destroy the base, the jellyfish lens flies out of the sea, pursuing the God Phoenix. The membrane protecting the God Phoenix is peeled off and puts it in a difficult situation. Just then, the Red Impulse group gets Nambu's instructions that in order to dissipate the poisonous gas the jellyfish lens breathes, they should throw high pressure oxygen at it. Protected by the Red Impulse machines, Ken flies they fiery phoenix into the jellyfish lens. The high pressure oxygen goes up in flames and the jellyfish lens burns to ashes on the surface of the sea.
16	"The Indestructible Machine Mechanika"; Transliteration: "Muteki Mashin Mekanika" (Japanese: 無敵マシン メカニカ)	January 14, 1973
The latest ISO weapon factory is used by Galactor and manufactures Mekanika. It's a machine which, according to the plan on a microfilm, can change its form constantly. The Science Ninja Team follows Mekanika. But when they lose sight of it, they continue searching individually before meeting in Nambu's house. While searching a tunnel where they lose sight of Mekanika, Jinpei discovers a base through a hole in the surface and sneaks into it. While trying to destroy the base, he finds a micro cassette. Judging from the behaviour of the Galactor members, this cassette seems to be very important and Jinpei takes it with him while fleeing. It contains the plans needed to change the form of Mekanika. Nambu makes a new plan, based on the cassette, and instructs the Science Ninja Team how to install this plan in Mekanika. As Mekanika transforms, there's a chink between the different parts of the casing. Ken sneaks into Mekanika through one of those chinks and wants to insert Nambu's cassette into the computer, but gets into a melee with Katse who was in the pilot's seat. Ken dives under Katse's arm and somehow manages to insert the cassette. Mekanika, according to Nambu's plan, transforms into a fair. When Katse sees that, he flees.
17	"The Grand Insect Operation"; Transliteration: "Konchū Dai Sakusen" (Japanese: 昆虫大作戦)	January 21, 1973
X, intending on using the strong destructive tendencies of humans, especially children, releases Kabutoron in the city. It destroys things using the children's brain waves. The children are happy when they find big stag beetles in one of the open areas, something which rarely happens in town. Also Jinpei finds one of the bugs and brings it home. On that night, each of the children's stag beetles grow large and they pull the children inside their bodies, fly out the room and start to destroy the city. While flying, Ken discovers how Kabutoron attacks a nuclear plant. But since Jinpei is missing, the God Phoenix cannot take off. Ken transmutes into his G1 plane and uses his X-ray on Kabutoron. Because he sees a child in the interior, he ceases to attack. The four members of the Science Ninja Team shadow Kabutoron and discover a base hidden in an ancient ruin. In the interior of the base, an operation intending to remove the children's brains and install them into Kabutoron is about to begin. A drill is just touching Jinpei's head when he's saved by a hair's breadth by Ken and Jun. They save the other children with Joe's help. Ken and the others get into the God Phoenix. Bombed by Red Impulse, Kabutoron blows up together with the base.
18	"Revenge! The Whale Operation"; Transliteration: "Fukushū! Kujira Sakusen" (Japanese: 復讐！くじら作戦)	January 28, 1973
A huge whale keeps attacking harbours. While investigating a group of whales, the Science Ninja Team discovers a huge whale heading for this group. The huge whales fires a rocket aiming for the God Phoenix and flees, pushing aside the other whales. In reality, it's a Galactor submarine camouflaged as a whale. They want to follow the huge whale submarine, but, in order to save a young whale under attack by orcas, the G4 flies away. During all this, the submarine gets away. Nambu reproves them because of their squeamishness and puts a transmitter on the small whale so that he can help in the search for the big whale. The God Phoenix goes to the Arctic Circle, following the small whale. In order to search for the base, Ken and Joe leave the God Phoenix and encounter two men who introduce themselves as forest-keepers, but are then attacked from behind. Ken is baffled. Joe says that this is Galactor's trick and that his parents got murdered by the very same trick. The Science Ninja Team discovers the base and sneaks into it. They learn that a group of submarines is about to leave and attack the harbours in the world. They install explosives in the base and in the submarines. But, in order to help the little whale who ended up in the base, Jinpei dives with him into the sea. The Science Ninja Team can't stop the operation at this point, and escapes leaving Jinpei. But after the explosion of the base and the submarines, they are contacted by Jinpei, saying that he was saved by the small whale, and everybody is very relieved.
19	"Speed Race from Hell"; Transliteration: "Jigoku no Supīdo Rēsu" (Japanese: 地獄のスピード・レース)	February 4, 1973
The Ruman Kingdom is known as the "Gambling Kingdom". Galactor, guaranteeing the king's position, is channeling millions in riches out of the country. His highness Prince Luga's heart is torn by the people moaning with the high taxes imposed by the kingdom. So he contacts the ISO and offers to hand over a microfilm containing the location of the Galactor bases and headquarters to them. He does this knowing that it's against his father the king's orders. In order to lay their hands on the film, the Science Ninja Team takes part in a race sponsored by the prince in which everybody can participate. But the encounter obstacles set by Galactor, who know the prince's plans. They're lured, together with the prince, into the base located in the interior of the kingdom. Katse wants to force them into exchanging the film against the king's life. But the prince has already handed over the film to Ken. Katse gets angry and shoots the king. The prince, clinging to his father's body, cries. But he now has his duty towards the people of the kingdom. Katse wants to take back the film by force. In order to achieve this, he wants to cut open Jinpei's belly, since he pretended to swallow the film. After the ensuing brawl, Joe has Katse cornered and is about to take away his mask, but Katse get away again by a hair's breadth. Despite the fact that they saved the prince's life, the film, which cost a huge sacrifice, was burned as well.
20	"A Critical Moment for the Science Ninja Team"; Transliteration: "Kagaku Ninja Tai Kiki-Ippatsu" (Japanese: 科学忍者隊危機一発)	February 11, 1973
A Galactor mole mecha appears. The Science Ninja Team is contacted and starts to meet, but on the way there, Joe wants to save a small dog beside his mother, who was killed in the attack. Joe suffers a rocket attack. The mecha starts attacking the God Phoenix as well, but, since it gets weak in the sun, it has to withdraw at dawn. In an examination, it becomes known that Joe got hit in the head by a fragment of the rocket. Since it's a very dangerous area, an operation is impossible. Also, the attempt in the high speed centrifuge fails. Then a message arrives saying that the mecha has appeared again. The other four members are mobilized, but their thoughts remain with Joe. But because the G2 car does not meet up with them, the God Phoenix cannot use its normal powers. At that moment, Joe appears in the G-2. He's taken immediately into the God Phoenix, but while they are still thinking about the reunion, they are caught in the mecha's hand. The God Phoenix wants to escape its certain doom, but it's impossible. Joe presses the firing button for the rockets and blows up the mole mecha. The God Phoenix is caught in the resulting shock wave and is thrown away rotating heavily, but with Ryu's steering capabilities they recover. The resulting jolt gets the fragment out of Joe's head and he escapes alive.
21	"Who is Leader X?"; Transliteration: "Sōsai Ekkusu wa Dare da" (Japanese: 総裁Xは誰だ)	February 18, 1973
A horse owned by a doctor who is an authority in the area of cyborgs, participates and wins with an astonishing performance at the world-famous horse grand prix. When Nambu sees this video, he guesses that this horse is a cyborg. He orders the Science Ninja Team to guard the doctor so that his astonishing cyborg technique is not abused. But when Ken and the others arrive, it's already too late. Only one Galactor badge has been left behind and the doctor has vanished. Dr. Henjinman has been brought to the base where he recognizes X's real face. He threatens X, saying that he will reveal his secret if he is not made X's representative. X reluctantly agrees. The doctor's cyborg horses attack a meadow. The Science Ninja Team pursue them and sneak into the base. Inside, they find the doctor standing before X to reveal his face, just as he wanted. The doctor falls down as he's hit by light rays projected by X when Katse pressed a button. Katse orders the horses to attack the city and flees. The Science Ninja Team escapes and blows up the base. Dying, the doctor tells them to press the buttons on the horses' backs. After the Science Ninja Teams has pressed the buttons on each of the horses, he activates the self-destruct mechanism of the horses and silently dies.
22	"The Firebird Versus The Fire-Breathing Dragon"; Transliteration: "Hi no Tori Tai Hikui Ryū" (Japanese: 火の鳥対火喰い竜)	February 25, 1973
A uranium mining factory at the bottom of the sea is attacked by the mecha Kingdragon. Since a guard vessel with much more power than the God Phoenix was beaten during the attack, Nambu does not order the Science Ninja Team deployed. But Ken disobeys Nambu's orders and goes to face the mecha in the God Phoenix. But the God Phoenix is no match against the enemy and even their trump card, the firebird, is beaten by the much higher temperatures. Nambu orders the Red Impulse group to attack the mecha, but the Red Impulse commander believes that Ken should face the enemy again and refuses Nambu's order. So Nambu comes up with another plan. He wants to install a cooling device in the God Phoenix, which is then supposed to react with a minus bomb to be installed in the interior of the mecha to freeze the enemy. Knowing this will be very dangerous, Ken applies for the job of installing the minus bomb. Hiding in a swarm of tuna, Ken sneaks into the mecha. He succeeds in placing the bomb, but he has no more time to escape as the mecha starts to freeze from the icy firebird. The Science Ninja Team is worried and wondering about Ken, when he suddenly appears in front of them from a crack in the mecha, like an immortal bird.
23	"The Mecha-Ball Runs Wild"; Transliteration: "Dai Abare Meka Bōru" (Japanese: 大暴れメカ・ボール)	March 4, 1973
From the cellar of a bowling alley, the "Mecha Ball" appears and starts to destroy the city. Because of the Mecha Ball's simple structure, an attack is futile since there is no weak point. Opposing his four eager teammates, Ken decides not to go out, saying that if they attack without a chance for winning, they will only die a useless death. At the same time, Ken watches Jinpei move a pachinko ball with a magnet and gets an idea how to defeat the mecha. When Nambu hears Ken's proposal, he immediately builds a huge electrical magnet in the middle of the alps and decides that the God Phoenix must lure the mecha there. But with the mecha lured halfway to its destination, it changes its course to an international nuclear plant. Ken wants to get into the mecha himself and steer it towards the magnet. Joe wants to stop him, but Ken convinces him and flies away from the God Phoenix. Getting in the mecha alone, Ken defeats the Galactor members and changes the course of the mecha. He destroys the steering panel, making sure the course cannot be changed anymore. As Jun holds her breath and watches, the mecha ball is drawn towards the magnet and explodes. Ken's figure is reflected in the tear-filled eyes of the four teammates, similar to a bird flying in the sky.
24	"The Neon Giant that Smiles in the Dark"; Transliteration: "Yami ni Warau Neon Kyojin" (Japanese: 闇に笑うネオン巨人)	March 11, 1973
Scientists from the ISO headquarters are murdered one after the other and Nambu orders the Science Ninja Team to act as bodyguards. The Science Ninja Team separate for their guard duty. During Ken's guard, he surprisingly meets Galactor's Ninja Blackbirds and follows them, but loses sight of them near an amusement park. At the same time, Jun and Jinpei are attacked by a Neon Giant which appeared accompanied by the sounds of a flute. In order to let the scientist escape, they offer themselves as bait, but fall off the street. Jun reports that the Neon Giant resembles the Indian statue standing before the amusement park where the Black Birds vanished. Because of that, the Science Ninja Team waits for the night and sneaks into the park to start investigating. Since Jun said that she heard the sounds of a flute, Ken follows a flutist who leads him into an underground base. It's Katse in disguise. Katse tells Ken that this night, Nambu will get attacked. Ken gets in contact with Joe and Ryu, telling them to hurry to Nambu's location, but he's caught in a pertinacious attack from the Black Birds. Before his eyes, Katse steers the Neon Giant with the flute's tune. When Jun and Jinpei intrude, Ken flings the flute away, and orders Jinpei to play on it. Through Jinpei's nonsensical tune, the Neon Giant overheats and explodes. The plan to assassinate Nambu has failed.
25	"The Magma Giant, Emperor of Hell"; Transliteration: "Jigoku no Teiō Maguma Kyojin" (Japanese: 地獄の帝王マグマ巨人)	March 18, 1973
An ISO volcanic research center is attacked. The God Phoenix, starting the investigation, is surprised by the Magma Giant and escapes into the sea where the Giant cannot follow it. When Joe says that the Magma Giant's face resembles the face of Jesus Christ sculptured into a steep slope in the national park, the Science Ninja Team goes there to investigate. A girl climbing the Jesus Christ sculpture is suspected to be a Galactor agent by Joe and questioned, but she answers that she's here to sculpture the statue, continuing the tradition of her family in the third generation. Together with the girl they go into the cave found in the steep slope and discover a base. The Jesus Christ face sculpted in the slope, is plunged into lava seething in the interior of the base and comes out as the Magma Giant. Seeing this, Ken calls the God Phoenix. At the top of the base, there's a special glass which is actually at the bottom of a sea. The sea is used as a lens to heat the magma, using the sunlight. With a rocket, they break the glass and thus destroy the base. When a message comes in from Nambu that the Magma Giant is heading towards a city, the Science Ninja Team split up in their individual machines and lure the Magma Giant towards the sea. The Magma Giant cannot resist and steps into the sea. Through the sea water he's instantly cooled and becomes a black piece of rock, standing still. The girl then gets her chisel to begin sculpting again.
26	"The God Phoenix Reborn"; Transliteration: "Yomigaere Goddo Fenikkusu" (Japanese: よみがえれゴッドフェニックス)	March 25, 1973
ISO ships are attacked one after the other by Galactor's black ray. And because Ryu is napping in the God Phoenix, he cannot be mobilized. Ryu feels responsible and gives Nambu his bracelet back, while shaking off his teammates who want to stop him. He then goes back to the fishing village where he was born. During this time, the fishing areas in the village become polluted through unknown causes. Since Ryu's father is the co-operative head, he is blamed by the village people. Ryu tells his father to ask Nambu to analyse the sea water. In the analysis, a matter is found which results from a process to produce metal. Nambu thinks it's Galactor's deed and arrives in the fishing village with the Science Ninja Team. Thinking that the sea is strange, Ryu, together with Ken who has been following him, discovers a machine in the water shaped like a ray, which can fly in the sky and dive in the sea. Following it, they discover a base and sneak into it, but end up getting caught. When they succeed in barely escaping, Galactor is about to deploy the ray machines to attack the world. The two men lock themselves up in the command room and defeat Galactor by letting water flow into the base, but they wind up getting caught into the base themselves. Ken reports to Nambu that the destruction of the base has been accomplished by Ryu and requests that he be taken back into active service. The two men, waiting for their death, are rescued by the G4 machine. Back on surface, Ryu gets his bracelet back from Nambu.
27	"Galactor's Witch Racer"; Transliteration: "Gyarakutā no Majo Rēsā" (Japanese: ギャラクターの魔女レーサー)	April 1, 1973
The ISO gets a message from Lucy, one of the executives at Galactor, that she wants to reveal the location of their headquarters in exchange for $10 billion. Therefore, they contact Lucy by having Joe team up with her in the world customer car endurance race across Africa. The other four team members are going to act as guards for their scout. After Joe gets into the car, he expects the information immediately, but Lucy says it's not possible until the rally is over. On the way, they are attacked by mechas camouflaged as animals. It is Galactor who have come to know of Lucy's treason. But with Ken and the other's help, they escape the attacks and continue the rally. As they approach the finish line, Lucy asks her old friend Joe whether they don't want to team up and takeover Galactor. Evading all kind of obstacles, the team of Lucy and Joe wins the race and gets $100,000 in prize money. In the tea room, Joe demands that Lucy gives him the information as offered. When Lucy tries to answer, she suddenly starts to move strangely and finally breaks through a wall and falls to the ground where she explodes. She was a cyborg manufactured by Galactor, and a radio signal emitted by X caused her to self-destruct. Joe is taken aback by Lucy who is now nothing more than a pile of iron fragments. His anger towards Galactor is ignited again.
28	"The Invisible Devil"; Transliteration: "Mienai Akuma" (Japanese: 見えない悪魔)	April 8, 1973
Children keep dissolving into thin air. Even the members of the Science Ninja Team become eye witnesses to one of the disappearances. Ken follows some tire tracks on the ground and enters a mirror maze. There he discovers some snail mechas, but they become transparent and disappear. Galactor is collecting children with strong brain waves in order to produce the brain wave monster Alphagila. The monster reads the secrets of the ISO in its institutions, and then destroys them. Nambu enhances Jun's brain waves for a while and makes her pose as a bait. The Science Ninja Team locates her radio signal, sneaks into the base beneath the mirror maze and saves the children. Then, based on the information he got, Katse is going to a uranium storage room in the desert. But, because the interior of the room becomes a mirror dome, the mechas which snuck in and should be transparent, become visible. In reality, they fall into the trap Nambu prepared. The mechas are thrown aside by the fast-approaching God Phoenix. The Science Ninja Team thinks that they have cornered Katse for sure this time, but he gets away again, disappearing in blue-white flames.
29	"Gallack X, the Demon Man"; Transliteration: "Majin Gyarakku Ekkusu" (Japanese: 魔人ギャラックX)	April 15, 1973
Jinpei and Ryu visit the Shirayuki orphanage where Jinpei grew up, in order to play with friends. The children beg them to take them to watch some kickboxing. At the same time, in a volcanic area, strange things are happening. Ken and the other two go to investigate, but don't find anything extraordinary. After watching the fight, the children go to ask the winner, Galack X, for an autograph. They learn however that he was trained with deadly weapons in his boxing gloves. They are caught by the female assistant and taken away. Ryu, following Galack X by Jinpei's request, battles with Galack X, but gets hurt. He contacts Ken and the others. Jinpei, following the children, sneaks into a building behind the orphanage. There's a Galactor base and the assistant is Katse in disguise. Katse intends to have the now inactive volcano erupt and burn the city. Jinpei's clackers hit the switch and the eruption begins. Katse escapes in a rocket. With Ken and others, who had now arrived, they defeat Galack X and save the children. But the lava is flowing out of the mountain in direction of the city. Burning the orphanage, it continues its way. Despite his injuries, Ryu suddenly comes flying in the God Phoenix. They unite and destroy the mountain with a rocket, succeeding in damming up the lava. The city is saved, but the orphanage is completely burned. The Science Ninja Team starts to rebuild it, together with the children.
30	"Kamisoral, the Guillotine Iron Beast"; Transliteration: "Girochin Kaijū Kamisorāru" (Japanese: ギロチン怪獣カミソラール)	April 22, 1973
A water shortage is occurring everywhere. As if to pursue the beaten enemy, an invisible enemy continues to pound, destroying dams and water tanks. The Earth is put into a grave situation. The God Phoenix is mobilized and discovers the flying mecha Kamisoral which has become a white shadow. Merely flying past it causes great damage and missiles are useless since they can be cut apart by the mecha's sickle. The Science Ninja Team somehow manages to escape and report to Nambu. During this time, an announcement from Katse is received saying that tomorrow will be the last day for mankind. Nambu guesses that the Mecha will attack a nuclear power plant next. In order to create turbulences and a vacuum, which are regarded to be the mecha's weak point, a plan to create artificial rain is changed to the size of a typhoon. Equipped with a special filter, the God Phoenix goes to the power plant and succeeds to lure the mecha in the test area for the artificial rain fall. While waiting for the artificial typhoon, the God Phoenix is caught by the mecha and has to fight very hard. The missiles show no effect either and the God Phoenix, caught in the sickle of the mecha, is drawn into the typhoon together with it. In one instance, the force of the mecha's sickle is diminishes because of the thunderstorm's shock. The God Phoenix is able to escape. The Mecha is drawn into the eye of the typhoon by the vacuum and explodes. The Earth's crisis is over.
31	"The Plan to Assassinate Dr. Nambu"; Transliteration: "Nanbu-Hakase Ansatsu Keikaku" (Japanese: 南部博士暗殺計画)	April 29, 1973
Nambu's car is attacked by Galactor. But because of Joe, who seems to remember the Devil Star's rose bomb, they escape by a hair's breadth. Everybody wants to fully concentrate upon protecting Nambu since he's targeted. But Joe cannot agree with them and leaves the villa. In order to control his anger, Joe runs his car around a racetrack. When his parents were murdered, he too suffered a lethal wound by a rose bomb. His memories revive and he thinks of revenge. Just then, he has to save a woman from an accident on the track. Before parting, they make an appointment to race on the track together the following day. Meanwhile, Nambu boards the cross-continent train, along with Chief Anderson's secretary, in order to conduct an investigation. Ken thinks that it's a Galactor trap and boards the train too. The remaining three team members hide and wait for the Devil Stars in their individual machines. Ken defeats the Devil Star members in the train, but the secretary, having turned into the female commander, manages to flee in a disc-shaped plane. Jun defeats the Devil Star members who want to destroy the tracks further ahead. Joe faces the last remaining Devil Star member. He knew the spot through a feather shuriken left by Ken in a map. Their respective weapons clash. The rose bomb pierces the Devil Star's chest along with the feather shuriken. They go past each other and behind Joe's back, the Devil Star's mask falls away. Her face is revealed to be the girl Joe was planning to race.
32	"The Grand Gezora Operation: Episode 1"; Transliteration: "Gezora Dai Sakusen: Zenpen" (Japanese: ゲゾラ大作戦（前編）)	May 6, 1973
Galactor is targeting Lawnpark City, which the ISO has used all its resources to complete. The Mecha Gezora appears and starts to attack. The God Phoenix confronts it, but the mecha escapes through the use of a smoke screen. Receiving a warning from Galactor, the Science Ninja Team mixes with the other citizens and starts to investigate. But thinking this might be a Galactor trap, they take off their bracelets and split up in the city. While searching, Jun and Jinpei save a woman being attacked by violent criminals and get invited into a manor-house. Jun thinks all this is suspicious and accepts the invitation on purpose. The lady of the house ushers them inside and invites them to a delicious and abundant meal. Jinpei falls asleep because of a drug in the coffee, but Jun only pretended to drink and fall asleep. She watches what is going on carefully. When the lady of the house orders her men to kill them Jun offers resistance, but she gets caught. She excuses herself, saying that she's a city police officer, but the lady of the house is convinced that she's part of the Science Ninja Team and locks both of them up in a subterranean prison. Ken and the others get worried when Jun and Jinpei don't show up at the agreed time and they split up again. Meanwhile, Gezora tries to lure the remaining three members of the Science Ninja team into the open by attacking a chemical factory.
33	"The Grand Gezora Operation: Episode 2"; Transliteration: "Gezora Dai Sakusen: Kōhen" (Japanese: ゲゾラ大作戦（後編）)	May 13, 1973
The Science Ninja Team doesn't know where Jun and Jinpei are, and Gezora starts to attack. But with two of them missing, scoring is difficult for the team. Katse appears at the big city square and publicly announces that he will continue the attack until the Science Ninja Team shows itself. As the Galactor rifles are trained on some children throwing stones, Ken's boomerang comes flying in and Joe and Ryu also seize the opportunity to appear. Katse gets cornered, but boasts that two of the Science Ninja Team are his prisoners. Ken contradicts this statement, saying that the remaining two members are inside the God Phoenix. Katse gets into Gezora and flees. Jun and Jinpei are about to be executed by the lady of the house when, according to Ken's plan, the God Phoenix with five human figures in it passes on a screen. The execution is stopped. As Ken sneaks into a manor-house which appears suspicious to him, he finds a message saying that if he wants to save the two, he should come to the uranium storage building. The God Phoenix hurries there. There, Gezora is flying with the building in its hands. Ken sneaks into Gezora and saves the two team members. After Jun has installed a bomb, they escape together. The Science Ninja Team, again consisting of five members, shows itself and heads towards Katse. Gezora explodes when it touches the uranium, and again, Katse is the only one who gets away.
34	"The Evil Aurora Operation"; Transliteration: "Ma no Ōrora Sakusen" (Japanese: 魔のオーロラ作戦)	May 20, 1973
Strange radio waves attack people together with an aurora. Afterwards they run amuck and cause grave accidents. While fishing, Ryu is also bathed in these radio waves. Because Ryu's speech and behaviour are strange after he comes back to the base, an investigation is conducted. It results that Ryu's brain waves are like those of a cat. Additionally, Nambu is touched by those radio waves as well. In a rage, he tries to activate the switch for the self-destruct mechanism of Crescent Coral. Joe punches him out. Ken and Joe take Ryu with them and go to the place where Ryu got hit by the radio waves, in order to find clues. Because they can't get any answers, Joe gets angry and punches Ryu, who then hits the boat's panel and suffers an electrical shock. However, this causes him to return to his true personality. They think that an electrical shock might also work in Nambu's case, but because Nambu's brain waves keep changing their frequency, they have to destroy the mechanism producing the radio waves. The God Phoenix is therefore mobilised, and they seek the suspicious aurora Ryu saw. What they finally find is Thundersaurus, but the Science Ninja Team has to fight hard because the mecha's barrier of radio waves. A rocket is fired, but gets stuck and does not work. But as the mecha increases its electrical voltage, the blind shell explodes. Jun has made all the necessary installation to create a situation in which the increased voltage causes an explosion. The mecha is destroyed and all the people running amuck become their usual selves again.
35	"Burn, Desert Fires"; Transliteration: "Moero Sabaku no Honō" (Japanese: 燃えろ砂漠の炎)	May 27, 1973
In the country Doria, oil springs have been discovered. A battle has started between the king, keen on the mining rights, and the prince, who's on the side of the poor, revolting people. It has become a civil war. Now there's also a never sleeping force, intent on making this into a world war. The king, in a disadvantageous situation in this war, asks the Science Ninja Team for help. The God Phoenix sneaks into the country in firebird mode. Ken contacts Prince Ali and convinces him to talk one more time with his father, the king. Together, they go to the palace. But the king's answer is a volley of bullets, aimed at the prince and his companions. Ken stops the prince who wants to attack the king. They are both dropped through a hole in the floor into a subterranean prison, where they find the skeleton of the true king. Ken tells the God Phoenix to come and get them, thus escaping. At the palace, people are gathering to demand the release of Prince Ali. The Mecha Moskon attacks them with bombs. Katse, disguised as the king, is chuckling while watching this. Ken appears before him and cuts the escape rope which Katse is holding. Katse falls into the city streets, which are wrapped in fire. Elsewhere, the Mecha's nature of following every move is uncovered and the God Phoenix is able to lure it into the oil field. The God Phoenix shoots it and it goes up in flames together with the oil field. The people of Dorian see the God Phoenix, coming out of the flames as firebird, and worshipping the Firebird God, they start to believe in the rebuilding of their country.
36	"Little Gatchamans"; Transliteration: "Chibikko Gacchaman" (Japanese: ちびっこガッチャマン)	June 3, 1973
An ISO research ship is attacked and data regarding uranium resources on the bottom of the sea is lost along with it. In the middle of the investigation, the Science Ninja Team discovers three persons, a father and his two sons, floating in the sea. They say they witnessed the occurrence while fishing. But in the village they live, the brothers Taro and Jiro and their father have the reputation of being liars. Nobody wants to listen to their testimony that they saw an apparition of a crawfish and a moving lighthouse. Ken discovers that the squid the family fished out is a rocket. The Science Ninja Team decides to have a look at the lighthouse. Ken saves Taro and his brother from a lynx in the vicinity of the lighthouse. They were imitating the Science Ninja Team by putting on capes made of chicken feathers. The Lynx turns out to be a Galactor cyborg. Then, Taro says that he knows a secret passage to the lighthouse and leads Ken there. Beneath the lighthouse, there's a Galactor base. In the ensuing confusion, Taro and Jiro board the lighthouse rocket which also holds the uranium resource data. The Galactor commander, thinking he captured the Science Ninja Team, goes to the base where Katse is waiting. The God Phoenix, following the crawfish mecha and is attacked by special metallic seaweed and rocket squids. In the vicinity of the attack, they discover the base. They rescue the children and recover the data. Katse, though cornered by the five team members, manages to escapes again by using a glass partition wall.
37	"Renzilla, the Electric Monster"; Transliteration: "Denshi Kaijū Renjirā" (Japanese: 電子怪獣レンジラー)	June 10, 1973
Dr. Miwa is researching whether the surface of the Sanjo Lake, frozen over the whole year, can be used to produce strong energy from the sun, instead of using polarization glass. Now he has gone missing. He had questions because this year the lake wasn't frozen over and seemed to have started an investigation. Nambu orders the Science Ninja Team to look for him since he fears the misuse of the doctor's research, but also because the doctor is his friend. The Science Ninja Team, led by the doctor's pet Taro who was able to get to Nambu with a camera, heads towards the snowy mountains. There they discover a Galactor base. The Science Ninja Team and Taro are tricked by the doctor's reflection. Taro is washed away by water falling from the ceiling of the base where the surface of the lake is located. The Science Ninja Team is locked up by walls made of reinforced glass. But with Taro's help the Science Ninja Team escapes and intervenes in the test area for the mecha using the doctor's research. Ken's boomerang cuts through Katse's mask. Hiding his face, Katse flees. Ken, taking the doctor with him, steals the enemy's snowmobiles and escapes from the base. Taro attacks the snowmobiles of the Galactor members about to assault the doctor and the doctor is saved, but Taro falls out of sight towards the bottom of the valley. Lenjira explodes because the doctor is not present at the experiment. It disappears together with the base. The fate of Taro however is unknown.
38	"The Mysterious Mechanized Jungle"; Transliteration: "Nazo no Mekanikku Janguru" (Japanese: 謎のメカニックジャングル)	June 17, 1973
As part of the Mantle plan, a pollution-free city is constructed in the desert. Nambu and the Science Ninja Team have come into the city for the inauguration. In the middle of the parade, a man who introduces himself as the archaeologist Dr. Mukashiski, is distributing leaflets for a dinosaur exhibition. That night, the city is attacked by dinosaurs, and Ken sneaks into the dinosaur exhibition from Dr. Mukashiski. It turns out to be a jungle from the dinosaur period. Ken is caught by ivy made of metal and can escape into a subterranean sewer, but his bracelet is taken away this time. The doctor takes the bracelet and, in order to make this is own merit, hides it. Ken is severely scolded by Nambu who then orders the Science Ninja Team to get the bracelet back by all means. Nambu also leaves the attack on the dinosaurs to Red Impulse. Ken sneaks back into the sewer from which he escaped, and is discovered by the enemy, but G-4 followed him and saves him. Together they sneak into the base and rescue the three other team members who have been caught inside the base. They also recover the bracelet from Dr. Mukashiski. With the remote control destroyed by the Science Ninja Team, the magnetic propulsion energy of the dinosaurs explodes and they are destroyed along with the base.
39	"Jigokillers, the People-Eating Flowers: Episode 1"; Transliteration: "Hitokuibana Jigokirā: Zenpen" (Japanese: 人喰い花ジゴキラー（前編）)	June 24, 1973
Outside of Earth's atmosphere, a Devilstar ship appears. Spores of the Jigokiller plant are released towards Earth by Katse's hand. On a rainy night, women (and only women) are attacked. Jun who is alone in her shop, is attacked as well. She brings tissue of one of the flowers that was burned by her bomb to Nambu. In the analysis, the results reveal that it's a flesh-eating plant from ancient times. But it's not yet decided what its weak points, habits, etc. are. Because only women are attacked, Jun simply borrows a protective suit which allows the bearer to also breath deep in the ocean and drives quickly through the city on her motorcycle, acting as a bait. Jinpei follows her, and she is swallowed by the Jigokiller plant in front of him. The Jigokiller flees. While looking for Jun, the Science Ninja Team receives orders to burn some Jigokiller plants to finish them off. They are located at a water reservoir that serves 10 million people. The team members hesitate since Jun may still be alive in one of those plants, but Ken says that it's the duty of the Science Ninja Team and even though he's grieving, drops his plane's fuel onto the flowers. Knowing Ken's feelings, the God Phoenix sets the flowers burning with a missiles. Meanwhile, Jun is caught in the interior of one of the flowers. The flames are stirred up, and from the interior of the flowers white spores are released, spores whose secret is yet unknown to the Science Ninja Team.
40	"Jigokillers, the People-Eating Flowers: Episode 2"; Transliteration: "Hitokuibana Jigokirā: Kōhen" (Japanese: 人喰い花ジゴキラー（後編）)	July 1, 1973
Jinpei is lost in mourning in Jun's empty shop. Elsewhere, Nambu is absorbed with the research on the Jigokiller plants. Hidden in the sewer, the Jigokiller plants start their activities and many damage reports follow. Ken refuses the order to move out, driven by the remorse that he abandoned Jun. Red Impulse beats into him the importance of the responsibility that it's up to him to at least find her body if Jun is dead. Ken's bracelet receives a bird scramble signal. Despite the fact that it might be a trap, the Science Ninja Team is mobilized. Willy City is well equipped with sewers. They locate the bird scramble in a subterranean base. It is ideal for the Jigokiller plants, since they're weak in the sun and they grow in darkness and water. Breaking into the base, they are barely able to rescue Jun who is bound to a scaffold. Meanwhile, Nambu discovers by coincidence that his blood causes the Jigokiller plan to wither. Because of this, he finds out that the plant cannot stand the Y-chromosome that every man has. He entrusts Red Impulse with a special Y-chromosome bomb. Because of the bomb dropped by Red Impulse, a Y-Chromosome rain is falling and each of the Jigokiller plants wither. The crisis of humankind is over.
41	"Murder Music"; Transliteration: "Satsujin Myūjikku" (Japanese: 殺人ミュージック)	July 8, 1973
Invited by Jun, the Science Ninja Team visits a concert by the popular rock group Demon 5, who are kidnapped by Galactor right in front of them. Galactor has Demon 5 play the murder music composed by X. Using a Sonic Mecha, they start to play this music high above the city. The music destroys buildings and drives people crazy. The God Phoenix is mobilized, but meeting a counter-attack, it's forced to retreat for the time being. Revived by the operation's success, Katse has Demon 5 play another powerful murder music, but this time, the drummer uses his sticks to add a morse code signal. Jun notices this signal woven into the music. The analysis reveals that the signals tells the location of the Galactor base. Hurrying there in the God Phoenix, the Science Ninja Team saves Demon 5 just before their execution. But they are attacked by the Sonic Mecha. They get advice from Nambu that they should emit the same sounds, delayed by half a tact. As they follow this advice, the magnetic waves from the Sonic Mecha are interrupted and it self-destructs. Back home safely, the Demon 5 are in concert again. The Science Ninja Team is present as well, listening to the music as common people.
42	"The Great Breakout Trick Operation"; Transliteration: "Dai Dassō Torikku Dai Sakusen" (Japanese: 大脱走トリック大作戦)	July 15, 1973
During his vacation, Ryu asks a passing car whether they can take him with them. But the car is part of a Galactor plan to free prisoners. Ryu is consequently captured by Galactor and taken along to the Jinjin prison which houses only prisoners sentenced to death that have tried to escape earlier. Galactor, upon arriving at the prison, kills the guards and has the prisoners assemble in the prison yard. The plan is to make them Galactor members. Ryu is in the midst of those prisoners, but because he has taken away his bracelet, he cannot get into contact with Ken and the others. He decides to go along to the Galactor base. Learning of the incident, Nambu starts planning a trick operation to ambush Galactor. Ken, disguised as commander, has all the prisoners enter the God Phoenix, which is camouflaged as a Galactor transport airplane. He wants to draw some information regarding the location of the main Galactor base out of the Galactor leader who came to pick up the prisoners. Ken becomes a suspect and is consequently knocked unconscious. But the rest of the Science Ninja Team, with a tape containing pieces with Katse's voice, manages to continue the operation. The prisoners are cheated by a fake landscape built in the prison yard, and end up right back in the same prison again. Meeting his friends, Ryu thinks about the one man he met in the prison who dreams about going back home to his family.
43	"A Romance Destroyed By Evil"; Transliteration: "Aku ni Kieta Romansu" (Japanese: 悪に消えたロマンス)	July 22, 1973
The two countries of Bien and Ameria suffer from a long war. When the two countries finally make peace, their respective representatives standing for peace, Romina and Julia, get married as a symbol of peace. However, Galactor is planning to prevent the marriage of the two, to start a war again in both countries. The Science Ninja Team serves as bodyguard during the honeymoon trip. Joe thinks that the man he met in the airport, who supposedly has the same convictions as Romina, is suspicious. So he follows him, but loses him near an old temple. Meanwhile, Romina and Julia are captured by Galactor robots. Ken and the others, still doing bodyguard duty, follow but lose sight of them. Searching the vicinities, they find the old temple. The Science Ninja Team sneak in and are attacked by a dove-shaped mecha. They fight hard, but a sun ray reflected off the compact Jun dropped, causes the dove mecha to self-destruct. When they intervene in the interior of the secret base, they discover Romina Julia, their whole bodies turned into cyborgs by Galactor. Ken offers them the possibility to escape, but they chose to die, becoming the reason for peace, rather than to live as puppets for Galactor's will. Embracing and kissing each other, the two changed cyborg bodies are wrapped in a lightning, smashing the Galactor plot to bits.
44	"Galactor's Challenge"; Transliteration: "Gyarakutā no Chōsenjō" (Japanese: ギャラクターの挑戦状)	July 29, 1973
Galactor's Arkeo attacks Moroi City. But Nambu judges that the Science Ninja Team is no match for the mecha's shock wave, therefore they don't receive orders to move out. Even when an announcement sent by Galactor arrives, the Science Ninja Team only gets an order to stand by. The Team ignores Nambu trying to stop them and gets mobilized. But they end up in a dangerous situation when they're hit by the mecha's shockwave. They are saved by Red Impulse. Ken yells at the angry Nambu that it's fine with him if the bracelets are given to the Red Impulse squad. The Red Impulse commander asks Nambu whether it would be possible to hand Ken and the others over to him. In the Red Impulse base, located in the South Sea, they start special training. Ken and the Red Impulse commander keep repeating the exercise of quickly pulling up with their planes. The other four watch Ken with sympathy. He is very happy, feeling like being with his father, even if he keeps protesting. For those four, the other Red Impulse members wait with a special training as well. In the middle of the training, Ken sees the waves caused by a pebble thrown into the water by Ryu and suddenly understands the aim of this training – namely to invade the center of the shock wave. Again, an announcement of the next attack by Arkeo is received and the God Phoenix departs with the Red Impulse squad. By breaking through the shock wave and throwing bombs at the mech itself, they manage to make it explode. Ken, accompanying Red Impulse, does not know that this Red Impulse commander is his much sought-after father.
45	"The Sea Lion Ninja Team in the Night Fog"; Transliteration: "Yogiri no Ashika Ninja Tai" (Japanese: 夜霧のアシカ忍者隊)	August 5, 1973
A secret mining factory of the ISO is attacked, and the island on which the factory is located is besieged by Galactor. In the mine, an ore containing more energy than uranium is being mined. If this ore were to fall into Galactor's hands, the consequences would be catastrophic. Opposing the ISO which demands the protection of the ore, Nambu insists that saving the people is priority. The Science Ninja Team and a group of transport ships head towards the seal island where the factory is located. The island is hidden all year in a fog, and also Galactor is just standing there without being able to intervene. One group sneaks in, ducking under a Galactor attack, and gets near the island. They send G-4 to the island and he decides to get the workers out of there to the ships. He is able to hide them in a group of seals that had been surprised by a Galactor attack and are seeking shelter in the sea. The plan succeeds and the workers are saved, but the ore is stolen by Galactor's mecha. Also, the fact that the workers could escape gets to be known. The transport ships are attacked and the workers taken as hostages. Katse threatens to kill the workers if the Science Ninja Team doesn't show itself. The Science Ninja Team appears in the dome atop the God Phoenix, but the moment the guns aim at them, the baby seal Jinpei took with him jumps into the sea. The Galactor members are distracted for a short moment by that noise and the Science Ninja Team seizes the opportunity to launch a counter-offensive. They succeed in reclaiming the ore from the mecha.
46	"Gatchaman in the Valley of Death"; Transliteration: "Shi no Tani no Gacchaman" (Japanese: 死の谷のガッチャマン)	August 12, 1973
Ken is maintaining his beloved plane at the airport when a man with a gun forces him to fly a plane. Since Ken's plane has only a single seat, the man makes him fly another plane made for two people. During the flight, Ken seizes an opportunity and tries to take away the man's gun. However, the man fires a bullet which hits a wire in the fin tails of the Cessna, making it impossible to control the plane. The man, using the only parachute on board, escapes, saying that he will go to sell information to the ISO. Ken makes a forced landing, but because of that shock the radio device in the bracelet ceases to function. Ken sees a Galactor Mecha and follows the man who heads towards a valley. There is an abandoned Galactor mine there. Ken and the man are captured and hung up in an old well. The man has betrayed Galactor for money and has hidden a tape in the well which contains an overheard discussion between Katse and the Prime Minister of a certain country. Ken transmutes and rescues the man, defeating all the Galactor members in the building. But in an explosion occurring at that time, the man, who has seen Ken's true face and has followed him, is badly hurt. The Galactor commander, who got out alive, is about to attack them with a mecha. The man entrusts the tape to Ken, along with a message to his mother living in Hontwall, then he throws himself and the Galactor commander towards the bottom of the valley. What remains is the tape, which was smashed by the commander, and one name. "Kelly, Arthur Kelly is my name".
47	"The Devil's Airline"; Transliteration: "Akuma no Eārain" (Japanese: 悪魔のエアーライン)	August 19, 1973
In order to finish an ultracomputer, Director Anderson himself is hand-carrying the core of this computer in his private jet to the research institute in the Jetol plateau. Galactor anticipates this, and starts to move in order to steal the component before it reaches the heavily fortified research institute. The Science Ninja Team, in the God Phoenix, takes over the guard duty for the director's private jet. But the disguised Katse has already taken the place of a stewardess. Katse eliminates the pilot and has the plane flown to the base guided by radio waves. Director Anderson notices the disaster and transmits a morse code signal with the radio attached to the seat. Ken and the others receive the signal and immediately follow the director's machine with the intention of getting it back. But they end up being led to the Galactor base. Just before arriving at the base, the director escapes using the ejector seat. But the core of the computer falls into the base. The Science Ninja Team and the Galactor members start a fight in a room, but through better teamwork, the Science Ninja Team gets the component back. Having gotten back the minister and the component, they blow up the Galactor base with a rocket and afterwards head towards the research institute in the God Phoenix.
48	"The Camera Iron Beast, Shutterkiller"; Transliteration: "Kamera Tetsujū Shattā Kirā" (Japanese: カメラ鉄獣シャッター・キラー)	August 26, 1973
Galactor plans to use the Shutterkiller to copy data from ISO institutions and to then destroy those institutions. The ISO institutions are attacked one after the other. The Science Ninja Team guards the institution which is most likely to be attacked next and, shortly pretending to have been defeated, follows the mecha in the G-4. Jinpei finds the Galactor base in the middle of the desert and goes on digging into the earth with his G-4. In addition, the other four team members follow him and sneak in. But when they enter the base, the G-4 machine is left unoccupied. They start looking for Jinpei, and find a factory which restores the copied ISO data. Splitting up, they continue with destroying the factory and looking for Jinpei. Meanwhile, Jinpei has been taken along by a spaceship which is supposed to transmit rays from the mecha. Jinpei is saved and the factory destroyed, but Katse gets in the mecha and escapes. Attaching a wire to the mecha, Ken and the others follow him. Katse wants to shoot at them with the mecha's electronic laser flash. Ken notices this and throws his boomerang into the shutter part of the mecha. As a consequence, the mecha can't open the shutter and the laser hits its own interior. The mecha blows itself up. With a damaged hull, the Science Ninja Team returns to its base. But Katse will be back, showing his teeth.
49	"The Fearsome Mechadokuga"; Transliteration: "Kyōfu no Mekadokuga" (Japanese: 恐怖のメカドクガ)	September 2, 1973
The Science Ninja Team is accompanying Nambu, who came to the ISO headquarters for a conference. Jinpei discovers a car with the emblem of Galactor, hides in the car and goes to the Galactor base. But when he wants to get into contact with Ken, he is captured. Meanwhile, in Nambu's office, a message from Katse arrives saying that he will blow up ISO buildings unless the Science Ninja Team hands over some data regarding newly discovered uranium ore. Despite knowing that it's a trap, Nambu mobilizes the Science Ninja Team. Heading towards the location agreed upon, the God Phoenix is attacked by missiles from a mecha. Ken, using the many lobsters in the vicinity, causes the missiles to deviate from their course. Pretending to be done for, the case with the data is released into the sea, visible amidst some debris. The mecha collects the case and heads back to the base. In that base, the captured Jinpei escapes, sending a bird scramble. From that signal, the Science Ninja Team figures out the location of the base and breaks in, saving Jinpei. Realizing that the case is empty, Galactor presses the switch to blow up the ISO buildings, but through a trick of Jinpei, the Galactor base explodes. Jinpei is feigning to know nothing at all when the other four team members are very much astonished at the base blowing up.
50	"Trachadon, the Dinosaur Skeleton"; Transliteration: "Hakkotsu Kyōryū Torakodon" (Japanese: 白骨恐竜トラコドン)	September 9, 1973
In the country Inderia, droughts and heavy rainfalls occur every year. In cooperation with the ISO, a plan to build a dam in the hinterland to create lots of arable land is being made. But through mysterious events which are happening again and again around a shrine which will be inundated by the dam, the plan is only progressing very slowly. At long last, the Torakodon skeleton appears. The Science Ninja Team gets the order to investigate and sneaks into the country. Events like a landing transport plane exploding on the runway the God Phoenix was supposed to use, show the handwriting of Galactor. Jinpei and Ryu, staying in a cheap hotel, get involved in a murder case. Ken hears that the murder might have been connected to the fact that a golden coin has been found at the construction place. He thinks that the picture carved into the coin shows a secret underground passageway to the shrine and starts to investigate that shrine. While escaping, Ryu and Jinpei sneak into a Galactor base built in the cellar of the shrine and learn that the purpose of Torakodon is to have people stay away from the missile construction plans in that base. Ken and the other sneak in from the street and together they destroy the missiles. They blow up the control mechanism for Torakodon and defeat the Galactor members. Afterwards, they leave the rest to the local police and depart from the country. Then, just as Katse arrives in Inderia, the base explodes before his eyes.
51	"Cata-Roller, the Revolving Beast"; Transliteration: "Kaitenjū Kyatarōrā" (Japanese: 回転獣キャタローラー)	September 16, 1973
The Science Ninja Team follows Nambu's orders to come to Huntwall to spend their free time there. Only Ken doesn't trust those instructions. At that moment, a man in a white suit, being pursued by the police, appears and Ken helps him. But when they hear from the police commander that that man is a Galactor, the Science Ninja Team is on alert. While flying his Cessna, Ken is attacked, but saved by the Red Impulse commander. The man in the white suit is the Red Impulse commander. He asks Ken for help to get the legal proof that the defense minister of that country concluded an agreement with Galactor. He then tells Ken that he spent 10 years to stop Galactor's plan, abandoning his family. The two sneak into the mansion of the defense minister and get their hands on the film proving the agreement. However, they are discovered. The Red Impulse commander tells Ken to give the film to the president, then they split up. The following day, when they come to the presidential manor to hand over the film, the Galactor mecha Kataroller shows up right in the middle of the president's birthday party. It picks up the mansion and lifts it into the air. But through the Science Ninja Team, the people could already escape and the mecha, having failed to assassinate the president, goes away. Ken hears from Nambu that he can meet his father once this task is finished and goes off, his heart full of longing thoughts.
52	"Red Impulse's Secret"; Transliteration: "Reddo Inparusu no Himitsu" (Japanese: レッド・インパルスの秘密)	September 23, 1973
To be able to see his father! Carrying this wish in his heart, Ken follows the whereabouts of the mecha. Before him somebody is shot and wounded. It's Sabu, a friend from Ken's childhood. When Sabu says that he saw Ken's father in Huntwall, they both go there. In Nambu's office, Katse makes a bold appearance in disguise. He leaves saying that if the world does not surrender to Galactor in Huntwall, the V2 plan will be realized. The V2 plan is the terrible plot to make the Van Allen belt descend with a special rocket, thus extinguishing mankind with radioactive flames... Nambu orders the remaining four team members to stop the rocket without Ken. But the teamwork breaks apart and they can't use their missiles. The God Phoenix is surprised by the mecha and with skill they manage to defeat it, but they were definitely at a disadvantage. Meanwhile, Ken has met Sabu's treason and is held isolated by the defense minister in order to lure the spy Kentaro Washio into a trap. But coming to the rescue is Red Impulse. He scolds Ken that now is not the right time to ask such sweet things like how his father is. He then tells him the actual situation. Joe and the others have arrived in Hontwall, and before their eyes, the rocket takes off into the sky. Blaming the fact that Ken was not there, the Science Ninja Team is told by Nambu that Red Impulse himself is Ken's father.
53	"Farewell Red Impulse"; Transliteration: "Saraba Reddo Inparusu" (Japanese: さらばレッド・インパルス)	September 30, 1973
The Galactor rocket explodes in the Van Allen belt and humankind enters the worst crisis ever. Upon the message from Galactor saying that a rocket restoring the belt will be launched if the world surrenders within 24 hours, the representatives of all countries assemble. They feel the time pressure and want to come to a conclusion. Nambu tells them to believe in the Science Ninja Team and puts an autolock on the doors so that they won't open until the following morning. The Science Ninja Team is mobilized to take away the Galactor rocket and to restore the Van Allen belt. At approximately that time, Ken sneaks alone into the construction facility for the rocket. In order to complete the rocket within the timeframe, it is changed from automatically controlled to manual control. Ken, in the middle of Galactor members who are sleeping, tired from the now finished incessant work, emits a bird signal. But then Katse's gun is pointed at him. Ken transforms into birdstyle. The gun of the Red Impulse commander, who sneaked in as well, is then pointed at Katse. The God Phoenix breaks in and Katse escapes and the defense minister falls to his death. Taking responsibility, Ken says he will get into the rocket himself. Jun then tells him that Red Impulse is Ken's father. The dream of Ken to reunite with his father also becomes their eternal separation at the same time. The Red Impulse commander throws Ken away and gets into the rocket himself. Ken runs after him, calling for his father. In Red Impulse's mind, the figure of Ken in his youth is turning around. The rocket disperses across the sky and Earth is saved.
54	"Gatchaman Burns with Rage"; Transliteration: "Ikari ni Moeta Gacchaman" (Japanese: 怒りに燃えたガッチャマン)	October 7, 1973
Katse, who got into his stride by the funeral of Red Impulse, plans to destroy institutions related to uranium in the whole world. The representatives from all the countries assemble at the ISO, and a conference to discuss countermeasures is opened. The Science Ninja Team acts as guard. Ken alone separates himself from his friends, lost in mourning over the death of his father. At that time, he discovers a dead body in the middle of a fountain. Because the flag of the country of Atarii is attached to the body, Ken penetrates into the conference room and captures the Galactor who poses as the representative of the Atarii country. After returning to Crescent Coral, Ken makes the man spit out the location of the headquarters by continuously torturing him. Nambu slaps Ken, saying that his behaviour is not excusable by the fact that the man is a Galactor. Ken turn his back towards Nambu and forces the other members of the Science Ninja Team to go with him. Guided by the man, they go to the location. But at the base, which is only a common one, they encounter an ambush by Katse. They end up getting trapped in a room with walls made from ice from the north pole. Katse raises the room's temperature, thus causing the ice to slowly melt. He then leaves to attack the uranium institutions. Joe and the others blame Ken, that his behavior, which is solely aimed at revenge, caused all this. Ken wails whether they know how it feels to have a father killed. Jun rebukes him that he is not the only one without parents. Those words cause Ken to get back his calmness. The Science Ninja Team escape from the ice chamber and blow up the base. They pursue the Mecha in the God Phoenix and demolish it with their missiles.
55	"The Daring Mini-Submarine"; Transliteration: "Kesshi no Mini Sensuikan" (Japanese: 決死のミニ潜水艦)	October 14, 1973
The sea takes up 70% of Earth. Galactor makes Nambu and the Science Ninja Team chose between their lives and pollution of the seas by PCB. Pretending to agree, the God Phoenix goes to the pre-defined area in the sea, but when they blow up the approaching mini submarines, the pollution matter streams out and the Tarushia Sea ends up polluted. Ken discovers three tankers which seem to control the mini submarines and, using the mini submarine loaded into the God Phoenix, sneaks in. There, cleaning work is done for the returning mini submarines. Ken is discovered by Galactor. He defeats them and heads towards Katse's whereabouts, but in the meantime, the tankers have transformed into one huge tanker which emits a magnetic force attracting the God Phoenix whose hull starts to crack. Ken pulls the control lever. Katse, activating the self-destruct mechanism of the tanker, escapes into a passageway beneath the floor. Ken pursues him, but Katse escapes in a rocket. Ken and the Galactor members go out into the sea, but the pollution matter flowing out of the tankers is approaching them. The Galactor members each die as they touch the pollution matter. By a hair's breadth, Ken is picked up by a mechanical arm outstretched from the God Phoenix and thus escapes the danger. Soon, the Galactor cleaning capsules are released into the sea and it gets back its former beauty.
56	"The Bird Missile of Bitterness"; Transliteration: "Urami no Bādo Misairu" (Japanese: うらみのバードミサイル)	October 21, 1973
Jun is attacked by a group of bikers. Koji saves her, he is a former race champion and Jun's friend from childhood. Now he has become the commander of a Black Bird squad and is on the way to blow up the missile base of a certain country. When he wants to install the time bomb, the figure of Jun, the way he encountered her, crosses his mind. Without installing the time bomb, he runs away from the base. Jun sees his figure and reports to Nambu. She disagrees vehemently however, when her comrades voice the opinion that Koji is a Galactor. Koji, who didn't fulfill his task, is ordered by Katse to assassinate the president during a bike race which the president will be watching. Jun goes to that race, in which Koji participates, only very reluctantly. But she agrees when Ken says that they will try to save him if possible. Koji's attempt to assassinate the president is foiled by Joe's sharpshooting and ends up in failure. Koji seeks refuge in the officers' mansion. Jun follows him and sees how Koji gets orders from Katse. Koji notices Jun as well. The bikes of the Black Bird squad transform and unite into a snake-shaped mecha which starts to attack the God Phoenix. In order to defeat the mecha, Jun presses the launch button for the missiles. When Koji is defeated by the Science Ninja Team, he decides that this is the punishment for his own crimes.
57	"The Evil White Sea"; Transliteration: "Ma no Shiroi Umi" (Japanese: 魔の白い海)	October 28, 1973
Mike Miller, a sniper, has been released from prison after 35 years. Galactor gives him a small tank with a freeze gun on board and orders him to eliminate the Science Ninja Team. Three observation satellites high above the south pole are shot down. Guessing that this is Galactor's fault, the Science Ninja Team heads towards the area. Katse is awaiting their arrival, accompanied by a small tank. Joe tells Ken to pursue Katse and goes after the tank, but the freeze gun freezes him along with the G2 car. The rest of the team heads out in order to fight in their individual machine, but when Ryu sees how Jinpei is done for, he heads towards the tank without thinking and the G-5 gets frozen as well. But when Mike aims at Jun, he hesitates one moment and the bullet misses. Besides, the gun is starting to burn because of the continuous use. The fire is fanned by the G1 and the fallen over tank goes up in flames. Ken and Jun approach Mike. He asks them why they didn't fight using weapons. Ken answers that their individual machines are not equipped with weapons. Mike shows Ken the cores of the bullets he secretly took away and tells him that his comrades are not dead. He also says that he missed the shot at Jun because he saw in her figure his daughter from whom he was separated 35 years ago. Then he dies. Inside the God Phoenix, which is on its way home, Ken says that if they wished for weapons, it wouldn't be them to try outdoing Galactor.
58	"Hell's Mecha-Buttha"; Transliteration: "Kyōfu no Mekabutta" (Japanese: 恐怖のメカブッタ)	November 4, 1973
The Jet Cutter, developed by the ISO to gain energy without causing pollution, is stolen. Nambu gives the order to recover it. Ken opposes him, asking whether they have to pay for the faults of the ISO. It's because of a lack of reason which makes him think that he wants to attack the enemies of his father. Jinpei starts crying at the argument between the two men. When Ken sees this, he reluctantly agrees to be mobilized. Ken and Joe enter the cave where Mekabutta disappeared and are attacked by buddha statues acting as surveillance devices. Ken ignores Joe who suggest they should return to the God Phoenix for the time being, and he runs towards the interior. Joe follows him, but is hindered by the fire being spouted by the buddha statues. Ken discovers the Galactor base and Mekabutta in the interior of the cave, but gets knocked unconscious when he touches an iron grating with high voltage which comes falling down. When Ken wakes up in the God Phoenix, Mekabutta has already left the base and is heading towards a uranium mining factory. The God Phoenix pursues Mekabutta, but the Jet Cutter is loaded aboard the mecha and it spouts continuously heat of 40,000 degrees celsius from its four faces, on each side. The God Phoenix has to fight hard against it. But Ken, using the multiple firebird figure, lets the Jet Cutter shoot without pause, thus causing Mekabutta to self-destruct because of overheating. In the God Phoenix, on the way home, Ken apologizes for being hotheaded because of this desire to fight the enemies of his father. Joe tells him that if they defeat Galactor one by one, Katse will be cornered.
59	"The Secret of the Monster Mecha Factory"; Transliteration: "Kaijū Meka Kōjō" (Japanese: 怪獣メカ工場)	November 11, 1973
A fishing-boat is in the vicinity of Ghost Island and becomes eyewitness to a big ray and cuttle-fish. Afterwards, it is swallowed by a huge waterspout and is shipwrecked. On Nambu's orders, Ken and Jun land on the island and start to investigate. As night falls, the two of them see how previously defeated Galactor mechas appear to explode as they are swallowed by a waterspout. They are convinced that there has to be a mecha factory. They defeat Galactor members who have come searching for intruders and take their place. Then they sneak into the base. At the base, Doctor Ogawara and his assistant Nakamora are about to explain the new mecha Komaking to Katse. Ken tells Jun to contact the God Phoenix, then he gets into the mecha. But Jun follows him, sneaking in as well. The God Phoenix fights hard against the waterspout created by Komaking. But Ken and Jun destroy the power generator of the mecha and it starts to fall. Ken catches Katse in the command room and brings him back to the God Phoenix. Fulfilling a wish he has since a long time, Ken pulls off Katse's mask. But the face appearing beneath it is the one of Nakamora. Katse has already escaped. When Ken weeps tears of anger the words of his father seem to resound in his ear, encouraging him.
60	"Science Ninja Team, Number G-6"; Transliteration: "Kagaku Ninja Tai Jī-Roku-Gō" (Japanese: 科学忍者隊G－6号)	November 18, 1973
During an experiment with Galactor's brand-new mecha, the research machine crashes. Katse commands the termination of the survivors. The Science Ninja Team arrives at the crash site of the machine. It is not clear what the purpose of that machine was. They discover a young man and bring him back. The young man has lost his memory. He and Jinpei become good friends. When the name of Galactor is said, the young man shows a strong reaction in his nerves. He goes out on a motorcycle together with Ken. They are attacked by Galactor and from that shock, the young man remembers the location of the base, the weak points of the mecha and also that he himself is a Galactor. Ken wants to go to confront the mecha and take the young man with them. The young man declines, suffering from the fact that he's a Galactor. However, Ken convinces him to go with them. Jinpei then addresses him as "Science Ninja Team G-6". Ken and the young man sneak into the mecha. While Ken attracts the enemy, the young man seeks the device to reverse the flame and laser gun, the weak point of the mecha. However, he is captured by the commander and told to shoot Ken with the gun given to him. Ken tells him to think this over. The young man points the gun at him, saying that this is his destiny. The bullet and Ken's boomerang fly away at the same time. The bullet pierces the commander, the young man is hit by the boomerang. He tells Ken where to find the reverse mechanism, then he breathes for the last time. In his report to Nambu, Ken tells the following: Through G-6's death defying deed, the mecha could be blown up.
61	"The Phantom Red Impulse"; Transliteration: "Maboroshi no Reddo Inparusu" (Japanese: 幻のレッド・インパルス)	November 25, 1973
Ken is flying over the country Hontwall in his G1 plane. He is shocked when he sees the three Red Impulse planes. The figure in one of the machines is undoubtedly his father. When the Red Impulse commander asks him whether he should lead Ken to the new base, Ken gets into contact with Nambu. However, without listening to Nambu trying to stop him, Ken heads towards the base. Nambu orders the God Phoenix to investigate what is going on in reality. However, the God Phoenix encounters a mecha without the G1 on board. It is caught and brought to the base. Ken asks Red Impulse why he didn't let him know that he was alive. Red Impulse answers that it was because he was looking for the Galactor headquarters. He says that he would like Ken to hand a briefcase to Nambu containing information regarding the location of some bases. When Ken brings the briefcase to Nambu, he learns that they didn't get any report from the God Phoenix. In order to make sure of the real intentions of Red Impulse, Ken goes back to the base. Because Red Impulse uses some delicate words, Ken understands that Red Impulse is an imposter. The commander is Katse in disguise and there was a transmitter installed in the briefcase. Ken gets angry and grabs Katse by the collar. However, Katse takes advantage of an opening and gets away. Ken is dropped into a subterranean prison under the floor. His abducted team mates are there. Ken escapes from the subterranean prison and contacts Nambu, telling him to get rid of the briefcase. The signal of the transmitter is interrupted and the mecha follows the small transmitter Ken attached to Katse. The Galactor base and the mecha end up attacking each other and are destroyed.
62	"The Snow Demon King Blizzarder"; Transliteration: "Yuki Maō Burizādā" (Japanese: 雪魔王ブリザーダー)	December 2, 1973
A celebration is held in order to praise the merits of the Science Ninja Team. However, the participants are super robots. They were invented by Nambu with purpose. His plan is to let them be intentionally captured by Galactor. Then based on their message, learn where the location of the enemy base is, have the real Science Ninja Team sneak in there. But Ken thinks that the enemy will not be fooled by them, so he takes the place of his robot. As Nambu intended, a Galactor mecha appears, freezes the robots and Ken with a freeze ray, and takes them to the base. After being thawed, Ken mingles with the robots and sends a bird scramble. The God Phoenix receives the signal and hurries towards the base. But the robots explode upon touching high voltage electric current. It becomes obvious that they are fakes. The mecha is deployed. Ken sneaks in the mecha and throws robots' debris into the propulsion system. The mecha crashes and goes up in flames. Ken is dead. With their breath held, his comrades look at the screen in the God Phoenix for a long time. Before them, Ken's figure appears slowly falling, having escaped by using the robot's capes as a parachute.
63	"Massacre of the Mecha Curve Ball"; Transliteration: "Satsujin Meka Makyū" (Japanese: 殺人メカ魔球)	December 9, 1973
Professional baseball players disappear in front of the spectators during a short power outage in the middle of a match. Nambu thinks that it's Galactor's fault and according to his instructions, the Science Ninja Team are keeping guard everywhere in the baseball stadium. During another game, a similar power outage happens, and the players disappear before their eyes again. This time however, Jinpei, who was acting as a ball boy on the field, has disappeared as well. The remaining four team members go to investigate the ground thoroughly in the middle of the night. But suddenly the surface of the Earth breaks open and Ken and Jun fall into a secret subterranean base. They are made to inhale some gas and are taken into a cell. Jinpei is already in the cell. He says that the players are brainwashed by some kind of drug and are to receive a special training in order to turn them into Galactor members. The three of them escape from the cell. Katse tells them that during the match this evening under the floodlight, a hydrogen bomb might explode. It would be capable of blowing away the whole country. Then he escapes. Ken contacts Nambu. Joe and Ryu start to search immediately for the bomb on the surface, but the game has already begun. Ken gets information from the commander that if a home run ball hits the backscreen, the fuse will be activated. A home run ball is hit. Joe and the others aim at the ball flying towards the backscreen. All four weapons miss their aim. However, the ball is knocked away just before hitting the backscreen. The ball falls to the ground and it is pierced by Ken's boomerang.
64	"A Christmas Present of Death"; Transliteration: "Shi no Kurisumasu Purezento" (Japanese: 死のクリスマスプレゼント)	December 16, 1973
A year earlier, the northern country Flanbel escaped from the rule of the Dictator General Somure. But Galactor, who instructs Somure, appears in the mansion of the Prime Minister and tells him that he either obeys or dies. By the demand of the governor, the Science Ninja Team sneaks in through the secret back door. On the peace memorial day, presents are distributed to the children by the governor. But the Suimusa group, which Jinpei met, have their presents stolen by children from the upper city quarter. That night during a patrol, the Science Ninja Team discovers that all the families which opened the presents are dead. They learn that the governor is a subordinate of Somure and has put poison gas into the presents. Meanwhile, the Suimusa group has gone to the celebration site in order to tear down the snow man to vent their anger. However, that snowman is the camouflage for Galactor's mecha. Mistaking the shapes of the Suimusa group for the Science Ninja Team, Galactor captures them. But they are saved by the Science Ninja Team who follow them and take them aboard the God Phoenix and escape. The mecha pursues them. In the interior are the governor and Somure. Burying the mecha together with Somure and the governor, the God Phoenix leaves. Inside, the Science Ninja Team says they want to make a present as replacement for the ones the Suimusa group missed. The Suimusa group replies that the best present was to have been able to fight alongside Gatchaman. The voices of the children echo "Justice will win for sure!"
65	"Super Bem, the Composite Iron Beast"; Transliteration: "Gōsei Tetsujū Sūpā Bemu" (Japanese: 合成鉄獣スーパーベム)	December 23, 1973
The conserved brains of famous doctors keep getting stolen. A monster also steals the brain of Dr. Yamashina, an expert in robot engineering. The Science Ninja Team follows it, but lets it get away. But Nambu gets a hold of one of the tentacles from the monster. Analysis shows that the monster is the low life form Bem from space. Nambu fears that if Galactor's scientific powers can control space life forms, they may be able to revive the dead brains. At a scientific exhibition, Dr. Yamashina's creation, the X1 robot X1, is planned to be revealed. In order to achieve that, Director Anderson requests protection for it. At the exhibition, Bem appears, unites with X1 and escapes. The God Phoenix pursues it, and discovers Bem again at the spot where it lost sight of him before. Galactor has Bem and the robot unite. With the brain energy of the doctors Superbem is completed. Ken has it followed by the God Phoenix and sneaks into the base himself. In the base, the commander guiding Bem notices that a brain don't have enough output. In reality, the stolen brain of Dr. Yamasina is an imitation placed by Nambu on purpose. Ken sneaks in there and destroys the energy source for Bem. His plan having failed, Katse orders the self-destruction of Bem. Bem and the base explode together and the God Phoenix, uniting with the G1, escapes the explosion using the Firebird.
66	"The Devil's Fashion Show"; Transliteration: "Akuma no Fasshon Shō" (Japanese: 悪魔のファッションショー)	December 30, 1973
The queen of the country Monarins is a big fan of the Science Ninja Team. Every year, she donates big amounts of money to the ISO. Katse comes into the country himself, planning to weaken the activities of the Science Ninja Team by killing that woman. Elsewhere, it is predicted that a Galactor assault may take place during the fashion show and the Science Ninja Team is put on guard duty. Ken and the others sneak into the country as common tourists. In the middle of the night, while Ken and Joe are investigating the surroundings of the palace, they are bathed in fire from the finger-ring bombs of some ominous figures. Ken, thinking that it is difficult to evade this attack, intends to take over the technique of the roller game, which is a characteristic for the Monarins country. Also, Jun gets hired as a model by the designer responsible for the fashion show. However, shortly thereafter, Katse and the Devil Stars take the place of all the participants except for Jun, who enters the palace and notifies the queen that the Science Ninja Team will always be at her side. In the final stages of the show, the designer announces an original design that turns out to be the Devil Stars. The queen, beleaguered by the Devil Stars, calls the name of the Science Ninja Team as the fashion of justice. As a result of the special training, the Science Ninja Team evades the finger-ring bombs of the Devil Stars. Katse sees that he's at a disadvantage and calls a mole tank to escape alone.
67	"Mortal Blow! Gatchaman Fire"; Transliteration: "Hissatsu! Gacchaman Faiyā" (Japanese: 必殺！ガッチャマンファイヤー)	January 6, 1974
Katse, opposed to Sosai X's orders to destroy the Mantle Plan, asks whether it wouldn't be better to conquer Earth after the Mantle Plan was finished. X promises Katse the rank of President Z, and lets him start the operation. But behind his back, X laughs and says that Z is a symbol for murder. Institutions of the Mantle Plan are attacked one after the other by a jellyfish mecha. The God Phoenix faces it, but its missiles have no effect. On the contrary, the launching ramp gets hit. The God Phoenix wants to escape with the multiple firebird. But mines are released upon the God Phoenix and it is wrapped in flames in no time at all. The God Phoenix makes a forced landing in the desert and explodes in the end. While the rebirth of the God Phoenix is being carried out by the ISO, the Science Ninja Team has no means to intervene and can only watch Galactor's attacks. They are in an irritated state when they receive the message that the revived God Phoenix is finished. Each of their individual mechas has been outfitted with a weapon. But Nambu tells the five team members that the purpose of those weapons is not to kill, but for defending themselves. When the message arrives that the jellyfish mecha is attacking the ISO headquarters, the God Phoenix is deployed immediately. Guiding the mecha to a mountain region, they defeat it with the weapons on their individual mechas and the Super Bird Missiles. But in Ken's heart, there is the doubt that if the development of new weapons continues, peace might still be far away.
68	"The Particle Iron Beast Micro-Saturn"; Transliteration: "Ryūshi Tetsujū Mikuro Satān" (Japanese: 粒子鉄獣ミクロサターン)	January 13, 1974
One day on a small island in the south sea, a nuclear explosion takes place. The ISO research planes crash and burn in the high radio-activity. From the remaining records, they learn that in the vicinity of the island there's radioactivity, but not in the center of the island. The God Phoenix is supposed to go to investigate, but in order to overcome the radioactivity belt, they have to use the Firebird on the way in and out. Beauce of this, they request a research ship to supply them with fuel. When they enter the island, there's no radioactivity, and the buildings are also undamaged. But there's nobody around. Joe sees human shapes in a tram which were exposed to very high heat and instantly made molten. He is convinced that a nuclear experiment has taken place. At that time, the walls of the buildings suddenly start to come loose and the radioactivity gets very strong. They get into the God Phoenix and escape from the island, but because of the shock caused by the radioactivity belt not being there anymore, they all lose consciousness. When they wake again, they are on board the research ship. There, Nambu is waiting and says that because of a change in plans they will return to the base in the God Phoenix. Ken is about to obey, but when Ryu says that, for passing the radioactivity belt, they didn't use any fuel, he turns towards Nambu and throws his boomerang. Nambu is Katse in disguise. The strategy of Galactor – namely to pose as Nambu and to be led to the base in the God Phoenix, has failed. Katse escapes in a disc-shaped plane.
69	"The Cemetery in the Moonlight"; Transliteration: "Gekka no Hakaba" (Japanese: 月下の墓場)	January 20, 1974
Galactor sneaks into the country Shosken, 80% of which is taken up by the Ohara desert and mountainous regions. Communications break off with a special troop which went there to investigate in the old tombs. In order to search for them, the Science Ninja Team splits up and mixes with the citizens. A woman confuses Jinpei with her dead son. But he sees his mother in her as well and goes to her house. There he hears the story that in the old tombs, which are called the devil's cemetery, caravans and people from the village disappear. Jinpei thinks that those tombs are suspicious, and sneaks in there alone. He finds a Galactor base where they are trying to gain uranium from underground quicksand. The people who disappeared are made to work there. Jinpei calls Ken and the others, who join him. Together they corner Katse. But Galactor has taken the village people as hostages and they are forced to release Katse. Nevertheless, Galactor wants to drop the hostages into the quicksand. But Ken's boomerang flies towards them. Galactor members are about to fall unto the self-destruct mechanism of the base. The self-destruct mechanism ends up being activated. Katse and the Galactor members escape. Ken and the others guide the village people hostages outside of the base. The woman is worried about Jinpei and wants to return to the tomb, but is stopped and collapses crying. Jinpei appears as a member of the Science Ninja Team and cannot show his face to the woman. After returning to the God Phoenix, he has a good cry clinging to Jun's chest.
70	"Death Girls Unite!"; Transliteration: "Gattai! Shinigami Shōjo" (Japanese: 合体！死神少女)	January 27, 1974
Mummified corpses keep being found. Since the damages continue, Nambu orders the Science Ninja Team to find out the cause of all this. During a patrol, Joe saves a girl from a taxi which is being attacked by mannequin mechas. He takes her to the hospital. But Ken blames him for not contacting him from there and doesn't trust the girl. Joe returns to the hospital and sees the girl running away from her hospital room. He also sees the nurse who has been assaulted. Joe follows the girl. The girl notices, and her face shows a slight smile. Ken, who has received a message and comes to the hospital, brings back a piece of plastic from the bed the girl was in. There he receives a message from Joe, saying "the cemetery of the puppets" and then breaking off. Connecting the plastic piece to Joe's message, the Science Ninja Team searches for a mannequin dumping place. However, Jun and Ryu are also captured by Maya, the girl who controls the mannequins. Through Ryu's Birdscramble, Ken and Jinpei sneak into the base and save the other three. Then they defeat the mannequins. Maya was allowed to leave Galactor if she succeeded in terminating the Science Ninja Team. But Katse shoots Maya, who failed, and goes away saying that it is not possible to leave Galactor alive. The masks falls from Maya's face. She tells the Science Ninja Team about the self-destruction of the base and murmurs that she would have loved living under the sun, then she passes away.
71	"The Invincible Leader X"; Transliteration: "Fujimi no Sōsai Ekkusu" (Japanese: 不死身の総裁X)	February 3, 1974
The ISO discovers a new energy source in the Himalaya, but an investigation troop sent there is annihilated by the Yeti. Because of several rumours about Yetis, Jinpei goes to the Himalaya alone. There he is attacked by the Yeti, but it is a Galactor Yeti Mecha. The God Phoenix goes to the Himalaya to look for the missing troop according to Nambu's orders. They get the message from Jinpei about the apparition of the Yeti and head towards the location this message came from. Elsewhere, matters have developed in such a way that Jinpei has been saved by Galactor members and is now working as a servant in the base. While working, he secretly sends a bird scramble signal. Additionally, when he brings food to Katse's chamber, he hears Katse speaking with X. The God Phoenix appears in the vicinity of the base and Galactor turns towards it, attacking it with missiles and flame throwers. However, because of Ken's tactic, the God Phoenix keeps turning back and while it is continuously shot at, an avalanche gets started and the base is hit hard. The God Phoenix breaks into the base. Ken and the others corner Katse again. Ken tears away Katse's mask. Katse covers his face and from behind him, X appears with a flash and introduces himself as the ruler of Galactor. The Science Ninja Team is blinded by the light and they lose consciousness. When they wake up again, Katse and X's form have disappeared. A certain anxiousness arises now that they are aware of X's existence. The mountains of the Himalaya still enclose that secret.
72	"Swarm! A Plague of Mini Iron Beasts"; Transliteration: "Taigun! Mini Tetsujū no Shūrai" (Japanese: 大群！ミニ鉄獣の襲来)	February 10, 1974
In Amazonia, the old entomologist (insect researcher) Toda who is continuing his research, notices unusual behaviour in the locusts. He notifies every authority and department, but he is not taken seriously. Jinpei, who heard his story, returns with him to Amazonia. The unusual appearance of the locusts is a Galactor deed. With a guiding radio signal emitted by a locust mecha, a swarm of locusts is made to attack the city. In the research hut of Toda, they are attacked by a swarm of locusts. While protecting the hut with a pesticide, they capture the mecha locust leading the swarm and Toda finds out the frequency of the radio signal. However, because of the interfering radio signals, Jinpei cannot contact Ken and the others. He comes up with a plan and sprays the form of the bird head shape into a meadow with the pesticide. Having received a message about the unusual appearance of the locusts, the God Phoenix has come to Amazonia. They discover the mark and join Jinpei and Toda. Because of the appearance of the God Phoenix, Katse accelerates his plan and releases mecha locusts and their locusts swarms, heading for the capitals of the world. Ken hears the story about the radio signal from Jinpei and has the God Phoenix emit the same frequency. He lures the locust swarms released in the world towards the sea and blows them up with a rocket. Only Ken and the other know that the true credit belongs to the old scientist who piled up years of research and was ignored by everybody.
73	"Pursue Katse!"; Transliteration: "Kattse wo Tsuigeki Seyo!" (Japanese: カッツェを追撃せよ！)	February 17, 1974
The Science Ninja Team vanquishes another mecha and has let Katse escape yet again. With Nambu's transmission, they follow the course of Katse's rocket. However, Katse has switched to a car and heads towards a jungle. The Science Ninja Team descends towards the jungle as well in his pursuit, and separates into three parties, searching for Katse. X receives an SOS signal from Katse and, together with sending a commando unit, takes additional steps by setting traps in the jungle. Joe criticizes Ryu for approaching a trap unprepared. But when he distrusts a wounded young deer, Ryu retorts that there's nobody more insensitive than Joe. Meanwhile, Jinpei discovers Katse and corners him, but is in turn caught by the commando unit. Before an ice covered mammoth, Joe and Ryu discover Jinpei is about to be turned into a human sacrifice. They save him and additionally corner Katse, who changed into a shinto-priest. But Katse seeks refuge in the mammoth mecha titan and attacks Joe and the others. They are saved by a hair's breadth by the God Phoenix and Joe wants to shoot a rocket into the mecha. But when he sees a group of deer below the mecha, he hesitates. Luring the mecha titan into the mountains, they shoot at the ground below the mecha with a rocket. The mecha disappears into an avalanche. The Science Ninja Team is wrong in assuming that, because of the jungle with the traps set, the headquarters is nearby. Its existence is however, still shrouded in the fog.
74	"Secret of the Birdstyles"; Transliteration: "Bādosutairu no Himitsu" (Japanese: バードスタイルの秘密)	February 24, 1974
The mammoth which should be buried in a glacier, appears at an amusement park where Jun and Jinpei have gone. While saving the children, Jun's shoe falls off and gets stuck between the mecha's claws. Jun reports the loss of her shoe. Nambu tells her to look for it. He says that, with Galactor's scientific power, they might be able to discover the secret of the transformation from the shoe. In the Galactor base, Katse orders the analysis of the shoe which remained completely intact after burning in the incinerator. At last they find out the frequency of the electrical waves which cause the shoe to transform into a white boot. X has Dr. Mizuno start developing a weapon to undo the transformation. Additionally, they start searching for G-3 based on the data gained from the shoe from 16-year-old girls that are recruited for a beauty center. Jun, who is depressed because of losing her shoe, applies for the job, even though she knows that it's a trap. The female commander, who has captured the four other candidates besides Jun, puts them to sleep and transports them to the base. Jun pretends to be sleeping and transmits a bird scramble signal. Jun is led off to the base and questioned by Katse. When it's almost too late, the God Phoenix appears. Jun seizes the opportunity and saves the girls, recovers her shoe and gets into the God Phoenix. Katse fires the rockets of the mecha, but because of the guiding system built in by Ken, the rockets return and the base explodes together with the mecha.
75	"Jumbo Shakora, the Ocean Devil King"; Transliteration: "Umi Maō Janbo Shakora" (Japanese: 海魔王ジャンボシャコラ)	March 3, 1974
While a Galactor mech is mobilized, one of the small planes loses speed and collides with the fisher boat on which Ryu's father is on. The boat is shipwrecked. When Ryu's younger brother Seiji hurries to Ryu's whereabouts and tells him of his father's shipwreck, Nambu's mobilization order goes out. Ryu desperately shakes his brother off, who is crying and clinging to him. But he ends up being late for the mobilization and the main research institute is already destroyed. Shortly thereafter, while they are doing bodyguard duty for a tanker, Ryu is worrying about his father's shipwreck as well and misses the course. In the meantime, the tanker has been attacked. Nambu scolds him that he didn't do his best. Ken defends Ryu and tells Nambu that they are not robots which just follow orders. Nambu tells them that they are under house arrest. However, Ken and Jun hear from Seiji about the shipwreck of Ryu's father and go out in the God Phoenix searching for the father without Nambu's orders. On one of the Amana islands they discover smoke and save Ryu's father and his comrades who are safe and sound. At that time, Ryu's father, without knowing that Ryu is his son, tells them the weakness of the mecha. Namely – when the small planes detach themselves from the main part of the mecha, the interior becomes visible. Aiming at a uranium store, the mecha appears again. The God Phoenix is mobilized. As he learned from his father, Ryu makes a rocket hit right on target into the main part of the mecha right after the small planes have detached themselves. The mecha is defeated.
76	"The Bracelets Exposed"; Transliteration: "Abakareta Buresuretto" (Japanese: あばかれたブレスレット)	March 10, 1974
When the mobilisation order from Nambu comes in, Joe is in the middle of a race. Because he finishes it, he is too late. On the way to the meeting he transforms. The electrical waves emitted while transforming are intercepted by Galactor and Joe is targeted by the completed Megazainer. His leg is hit by the high frequency and its transformation is undone. Joe falls behind a rock, Dr. Misuno however, is afraid of an explosion because of the continuous use and retreats. Elsewhere, the other four team members arrive in a burnt-down subterranean city. They start searching for the source of some suspicious electrical waves, but it is a Galactor trap. Joe is late and returns to Nambu's whereabouts, reporting about the weapon which can undo the transformation. Nambu tries to contact Ken, but does not get through. Joe follows the other four team members. Meanwhile, Ken is deceived by Katse's disguise and gets a direct hit by the Megazainer. However, he is saved by a hair's breadth by two members of Red Impulse. They have come upon Nambu's request to save the Science Ninja Team. Jun, Jinpei and Ryu are captured too and are to be exposed to the high frequency. Joe hurries to that place and saves them. Katse keeps aiming stubbornly at Joe and the others. There, the Red Impulse commander appears and fires a rocket. The disguise is thrown away and Ken appears. He plays with the Megazainer with his friends, which overheats and explodes. The Red Impulse planes pursue the fleeing Katse. Ken watched Red Impulse leave. Joe throws Red Impulse's cap at Ken who looks at the cap he's holding for a long time.
77	"The Successful Berg Katse"; Transliteration: "Seikō Shita Beruku Kattse" (Japanese: 成功したベルクカッツェ)	March 17, 1974
The country Dokual is rich in the Earth's resources. But because it declines to pay supporting money to Galactor, the president's life is threatened. The Science Ninja Team receives a call for help which reaches the ISO. They hide the God Phoenix at the bottom of the sea and secretly go to the president's residence. On the estate, several traps have been laid, but it is explained that they're only there to protect the President. The five of them meet the President, but from the fact that the President holds the cane in the hand opposite the side of his bad leg, they see through the Black Bird's disguise. They are chased away by the traps inside the residence and are locked up by glass shields. Poisonous gas is put in, but because the glass shields are opened when the Black Birds want to shoot them, they escape. But when the five of them go out into the city, they are attacked by the citizens. The Black Birds have been sending out brainwashing radio waves. At that time, a manhole cover opens and a boy rescues the five. He has turned a subway into a playground and therefore has not suffered the influence of the radio waves. He says he wants to go back to his parents' house. Ken and the others follow the sewer, heading towards the source of the radio waves. They fight the Black Birds who have been waiting for them and destroy the mechanism producing the waves. However, Katse appears on the monitor simultaneously and tells them that he has carried off this country's resources. Additionally, he boasts that there was a mechanism which caused the base to blow up as well when the mechanism was destroyed. Despite their escape, the Science Ninja Team can't hide its anger at their first complete defeat. The only help is the figure of the boy being embraced by his mother.
78	"Mortal Combat! 5,000 Fathoms Under the Sea"; Transliteration: "Shitō! Kaitei Ichiman Mētoru" (Japanese: 死斗！海底1万メートル)	March 24, 1974
Joe sees his parents killed every night in his dreams. An extreme exhaustion is left in his body. A research institute for the Earth's crust, which is located at the bottom of a deep sea canyon 10,000 meters below sea level, breaks off a connection. Ken and Joe go to the research institute in Marin Saturn in order to investigate. While going deeper, Joe takes a relaxing nap. As a message from the surface relates information about the existence of a mysterious submarine, Joe hears it, has a nightmare and pulls the cord of the radio set, tearing it to pieces. The submarine is actually from Galactor. The Galactor members have changed into the engineers of the research institute. They go into Marin Saturn together with Ken and Joe and, seizing an opportunity, they point their guns at the two. They take the Marin Saturn to a carrier and lead the two men into a gas chamber. But Ken sneaks away without much difficulties. He leaves Joe behind since he's not feeling well, as he goes to destroy the carrier. The fuel ignites and an explosion follows. Ken goes to pick up Joe and sees him standing motionless before the flames. Judging that the source of the nightmares is in the light, Ken has Joe face the flames. Joe's memory comes back. He wails that he himself is a child of Galactor. The two men escape by a hair's breadth from the exploding carrier in the Marin Saturn. On their way home, the two men discover the engineers who were captured in some ghost water and died there. Ken reports this information to Nambu in a message. Joe asks whether Ken wants to tell Nambu that he's a Galactor himself. Ken answers him: "You're the Science Ninja Team G-2". Standing up on the Marin Saturn, the two men watch the setting evening sun.
79	"The Stolen Gatchaman Information"; Transliteration: "Ubawareta Gacchaman Jōhō" (Japanese: 奪われたガッチャマン情報)	March 31, 1974
Secret information regarding the Science Ninja Team is stolen. Nambu orders the Science Ninja Team to investigate why the ISO scientist Boronbo acted as a spy and to stop any data from reaching Galactor. Ken pretends to be a Galactor and contacts Boronbo. He learns from Boronbo's story that his daughter has been taken hostage, but before Ken can introduce himself, Boronbo locks him up in his own house and goes away with the data. Through Ken's message, Joe and the others discover Boronbo's car near the ISO headquarter. Under a red sportscar, which is besides Boronbo's car, they discover the entrance to a subterranean base. The four of them are dropped from an elevator, but Ken who arrives late, saves them. The Science Ninja Team is beleaguered by Galactor members. In the middle of the confusion, Ken pursues the fleeing Katse and secretly joins him in a mecha going to another base. After Katse has noticed Ken, he wants to blow him up with the base. He installs a timebomb and escapes with the data. Ken has discovered Boronbo's daughter in the base and takes her with him, escaping from the base. Elsewhere, Katse is baffled at the data disappearing. Boronbo has cleverly arranged that the data is erased when the switch is turned. Rumi says that she would like to see the face of her benefactor. Ken covers his face and hands her over to Boronbo. In the train on their way back, Ken has dissolved the transformation and when Rumi passes him without noticing him on her search for Gatchaman, he picks up her fallen rose and looks at it for a long time.
80	"Come Back! Boomerang"; Transliteration: "Yomigaere! Būmeran" (Japanese: よみがえれ！ブーメラン)	April 7, 1974
In the country Assham, an uprising has started. Traces of a confusion ray appear on the body of the leader who has been shot. Thinking that a few hundred people have been bathed in that ray, the Science Ninja Team sneaks into the country. During the investigation, Ken and Jinpei notice that the peacocks, which are the country's national birds, and which are bred and released in the country, are robots. The peacock mechas cover the two men with confusion rays. Ken pushes Jinpei away and saves him from the rays, but he is attacked by the Peacock Devil a peacock shaped mecha titan, which then takes with him the car Ken has hidden in. Ken's boomerang remains behind. The Science Ninja Team receives a broadcast showing the car that Ken was in, being destroyed. They are grieving when the message reaches them that the mecha has appeared again. The Science Ninja Team says it's a fight in memory of Ken and gets going. The God Phoenix has to fight hard against the mecha, getting bathed in the confusion ray. However, Ken has escaped from the car and destroys the launching device in the mecha. The iron ball, which was about to be launched, opens a hole in the hull of the mecha and Ken can go to the outside of the mecha titan. Ken contacts Joe and tells him to shoot a rocket with a timing device into the titan. Because of the rocket shot into the mecha, panic arises and Katse ends up getting away. Just before the mecha crashes on the soil, Ken detaches himself from the hull. The timing device moves and the mecha explodes. His comrades are happy that Ken survived. Jun returns the boomerang to Ken's hand.
81	"Duel on Galactor Island"; Transliteration: "Gyarakutā-Tō no Kettō" (Japanese: ギャラクター島の決闘)	April 14, 1974
BC Island is an island ruled by Galactor. A man visits the grave of Giuseppe Asakura and his wife, which has not been visited by anybody for 10 years. Because the man on the photo transmitted is disguised and looks like Giuseppe, Katse goes to the island. It is said that Giuseppe's child died in the hospital it was brought to, but when Katse learns that the man who brought that child was Nambu, he has the child's grave opened. It is empty. The order to capture the man is issued to the whole island. While escaping Galactor's continuous pursuit, that man, Joe, encounters his friend from childhood, who is now Father Alan. At midnight Joe, who has been wounded, appears at the church and asks him to shelter him. While Alan is treating him, Joe learns from Alan's words that the Devil Star girl he killed earlier was Alan's fiancé. Slipping by Alan, who left, Galactor enters the church and Joe collapses because of the bullets. At that time, the Science Ninja Team has learned of Joe's past and hurries to him. The Science Ninja Team has defeated Galator, but then Alan appears holding a gun. Alan points the gun at them, asking who Joe, the Condor is. Ken answer that it is him. When Alan's finger touches the trigger, Joe's bullet penetrates Alan's chest. However, Alan's gun does not hold a bullet. Joe wails that Alan was the most needed man on this island. By the hand of the inhabitants of the island, a solemn funeral is held for Alan. Behind the rows of people, the God Phoenix takes off.
82	"Aim at the Crescent Coral Reef!"; Transliteration: "Mikazuki Sangoshō wo Nerae!" (Japanese: 三日月サンゴ礁を狙え！)	April 21, 1974
Dr. Misuno, a Galactor, succeeds in diminishing the earlier invented detection device, which discovers the electrical waves emitted when the Science Ninja Team transforms. Galactor plans to use it in an operation to track down the Science Ninja Team and follow them to their base. They rebuild some previous mechas and have them rage everywhere. Catching the short moment when the Science Ninja Team transform, they succeed in their plan. The Science Ninja Team, not knowing the Galactor plan, reunites in the God Phoenix, and wants to attack the mechas. However, Nambu suspects it's a Galactor trap and orders them to return to the Crescent Coral, leaving the mechas to the U.N. troops. However, the God Phoenix is followed by some crab-shaped bulldozers. When they notice their followers, Crescent Coral is already in sight. They contact the base and tell them to change their location. The base and the God Phoenix are however, already surrounded by some mechas. The crab bulldozers aim at the propulsion system of the base, but G-4 is mobilized and protects the system from the bulldozers. Desperately returning the fire, they manage to defeat the mechas and the base is saved. But Crescent Coral has been detected and, additionally, the secret of the capability to change its location is known as well. In the ears of the Science Ninja Team, the continuously approaching steps of Galactor are resounding.
83	"A Deadly Ring of Fire!"; Transliteration: "Honō no Kesshi Ken" (Japanese: 炎の決死圏)	April 28, 1974
During construction of a subterranean factory of the ISO, Galactor attacks and a drill falls into a crack in the Earth. Since the energy source of the drill is uranium, it is predicted that, when the drill touches the magma, a huge earthquake with a magnitude of more than 8 will occur. The Science Ninja Team, together with the geologist Dr. Karig, goes to collect the drill in an Earth investigation car, with the G-4 in the lead. The time limit is 10 hours. On their way, they encounter an ambush from a mecha. Ken gets into the G-4 and, acting as bait, lures the mecha away from the car. He then shoots his boomerang, converted into a time bomb, into the mecha. Soon the wagon is stopped by a rock layer. Joe and the others want to have the rock detonated by the monkey brought along by Dr. Karig, but from the monkey's collar, Katse's voice is heard. Karig's family is held as hostage and he accompanied them as a spy. G-4 returns to them and then digs its way just below the drill. Through Katse's message, Dr. Karig learns that he has been abandoned. He wants to stop the detonation by having the monkey bite through a cable in the interior of the drill. But the mecha appears and starts attacking them. Ken has the timebomb explode. The descent of the drill is stopped by the explosion, but Dr. Karig is buried beneath the drill and loses his life. Looking after the drill, which is collected by a crane, Jinpei takes away the receiver on the monkey's collar and stamps on it.
84	"Smog Fiber, The Spiderweb Iron Beast!"; Transliteration: "Kumo no Su Tetsujū Sumoggu Faibā" (Japanese: くもの巣鉄獣スモッグファイバー)	May 5, 1974
The scientist Demon tries to sell his own invention to Galactor by using it to attack a cargo plane, which carries goods for those in need. He hates Nambu, who has been battling him for a position in the ISO as a schoolmate. For leaking information on the mecha and thus luring out Nambu, Katse makes it a condition that the true faces of the Science Ninja Team should be revealed. Nambu agrees to Demon's invitation and goes out to an airfield. Demon notices that the Science Ninja Team secretly acts as Nambu's bodyguards. He takes a picture of the figures with a small camera hidden in his eyepatch, then throws a small bomb. The Science Ninja Team understands that their uncovered faces have been photographed and they lose their courage. Soon another cargo plane takes off and the God Phoenix accompanies it as bodyguard. Ken tells them to fly into the spider net of the appearing mecha. Through the information received from Demon, the G-4 is equipped with an electronic membrane and can cut through the threads with its buzzsaw, thus enabling the God Phoenix to fly into the mecha. Demon points his gun at the Science Ninja Team. The bullet hits Jun's bracelet and the transformation is undone. Demon points his camera at Jun but Ken and Joe appear in front of him, extending their capes and protecting Jun. The Science Ninja Team approaches Demon. He resigns and when he hands over the photo, he presses the switch for the self-destruct mechanism. After escaping, Ken and the others look at the photo in the God Phoenix. Voices with relieved laughter are heard. In the photo, only the legs of five persons about to fly away can be seen.
85	"That's G-4"; Transliteration: "Jī-Yon-Gō wa Aitsu da" (Japanese: G－4号はあいつだ)	May 12, 1974
The message is intercepted that Galactor spies will sneak into Utoland City. With a funny look to the Science Ninja Team, who are guarding the frontiers, the spies just walk in. Meanwhile, Jinpei meets a hippie named Dave and decides to have him work at the restaurant. Jinpei leaves the work to Dave and goes out in his buggy. He is stopped by a suspicious looking policeman for driving as underaged without a license. Seizing an opportunity, he flees, but gets hurt. Dave eagerly acts as Jinpei's male nurse and Jinpei starts to have feelings towards him like towards a father. But Joe thinks Dave is suspicious and watches him in the very act of communicating with Katse. Ken and the others use Dave to set a trap. They don't tell Jinpei on purpose, but he hears the conversation on his bracelet. He feels responsible and goes alone to the place where Katse is supposed to be lured. When they learn that, the four other team members and Dave race to the place. There, the Chessknight mecha is waiting. Dave wants to rescue Jun and Jinpei, who are hanging from the ceiling of a bridge. He is pushed by Katse to tell him what the true faces of the Science Ninja Team look like. Dave says nothing and pulls up the two team member. Katse blows up the bridge. Jinpei is saved by the G-5 craft. He thinks that Dave left not as a Galactor spy, but as a friend.
86	"Galactor's Monopoly Operation"; Transliteration: "Gyarakutā no Kaishime Sakusen" (Japanese: ギャラクターの買占め作戦)	May 19, 1974
The world sugar reserve is about to be exhausted. The artificial sweetener Shugare is developed as a substitute, but when the distribution starts, somebody buys it all. Because of the message that Shugare has been found in the water flowing out of the Bikkuiero mountains, the God Phoenix goes there. There they find a crashed cargo plane. From the wreckage, it turns out that the man buying up all the Shugare is an arms dealer named Gilman. From the black box they conclude that the loading place for the plane could have been in four different places. They split up the work and start searching. Jinpei and Ryu disguise themselves into a prince and his chamberlain, and offer a ransom for places where ants assemble. When they go out to verify the message a woman named Mei brought, they are captured and brought aboard a submarine. She's Gilman's secretary. Ken, having been contacted by Jinpei, says that he won't help them. He said they should lead them to the main base. Ken then starts to follow the submarine. After arriving at a relay station at the bottom of the sea, Katse, who turned himself into Mei, reveals himself and shoots Gilman. This is since the buying has ended, and he has no further use for him. Besides, he wants to reload the Shugare and go to the main base. But Ryu and Jinpei seize an opportunity and escape. They meet up with the God Phoenix which comes flying into the base. When they exit the base, Katse's submarine shoots rockets aimed at the God Phoenix, but they hit the relay station. While escaping, Ryu did a trick so that the submarine couldn't move anymore and is blown up by the Bird Missile.
87	"Patogiller, the Triple Combined Iron Beast"; Transliteration: "Sandan Gattai Tetsujū Patogirā" (Japanese: 三段合体鉄獣パトギラー)	May 26, 1974
While on patrol, Jinpei falls in love at first sight with a girl in a holiday house in the mountains. When Jinpei returns, he sees in the news that Maria, the daughter of a great multi-millionaire, has been abducted. He learns that that girl was Maria. Jinpei rescues Maria alone. However, a boy who took on six grown-up men and who disappeared without saying his name raises the suspicion of the local police chief, who is one of Galactor's men. Because there are policemen who saw Jinpei's face, the whole department is sent to search for the boy. A letter from Maria reaches Jinpei. Jinpei meets her in an amusement park which she mentioned in her letter. Maria says Jinpei had asked her to come here. Jinpei notices that it's a trap. Katse, in the look-out tower, orders Patogila to reveal the true face of Jinpei. Meanwhile, the God Phoenix is mobilized because of a crayfish mecha. However, they can't contact Jinpei because of interfering radio waves. And because Jinpei was invited by a letter, even though as a member of the Science Ninja Team, no one knows his address, they become suspicious and go to the amusement park. When the four of them arrive at the amusement park, they have a dummy of Jinpei with them and show its face in the top dome. Jun throws the dummy into the other side of the building Jinpei is in. Jinpei transforms and joins them in the God Phoenix. Now they can defeat Patogila with the Bird Missiles. Jinpei visits Maria who has been brought to the hospital. His comrades watch him with concern. Jinpei, having left her room, endures the pain of not meeting her again until Galactor has been defeated.
88	"Iron Beast Snake 828"; Transliteration: "Tetsujū Sunēku Hachi-Ni-Hachi" (Japanese: 鉄獣スネーク828)	June 2, 1974
There is a man who has guessed Katse's secret and who has worked his way up in the staff of Galactor. But he is in prison now, and is looking for help in a very safe place. Nambu shows to the Science Ninja Team, photos and the records of a female pupil that the man had had. On the back of one of the pictures, which is believed to show the female commander, a name is written: "Katse". In order to search for Katse's secret, Ken and Jun go to the school of the girl in the photos and the remaining three members go to the prison. Ken and Jun hear from Professor Howard of that school that the girl had an IQ of 280 and that she changed schools every year. Before changing schools, the performances of that pupil were below average and besides, the pupil was male. On top of that, he heard that at the same time they finished school, the record rooms of both of them were burned. After Ken and Jun left, a rocket is shot into the Professor's room. Elsewhere, Joe and the others who were supposed to go to the prison, fight desperately against a mecha. Ken joins them and with his wit, they escape from disaster. However, the Galactor commander has sneaked into the interior alone and has killed the man. The Science Ninja Team has to fight hard against the tough commander. However, he collapses when he perforates his windpipe with Joe's airgun, which he had laughed at as being a toy. Pursuing Katse's mystery, Ken and the others visit Professor Hume's home, but they are a step behind and the Professor has already been killed. The Science Ninja Team realizes that the bare-noticeable old man they went by on the stairs was Katse in disguise. They shudder at Katse's superhuman disguise.
89	"Lay a Trap in the Crescent Base!"; Transliteration: "Mikazuki Kichi ni Wana wo Hare" (Japanese: 三日月基地に罠を張れ)	June 9, 1974
Ryu laughs at Jinpei, who is moving earth with the G-4 machine in order to shape a coral reef into a crescent form. The purpose is to turn this coral reef into a bait and lure Galactor there. Nambu goes along with the plan and hands over a special liquid which dyes things red. When something is coloured by that liquid, it is visible on a special radar and cannot escape. G-4 is standing by on the bottom of the sea. Soon, Galactor's spy satellite discovers the crescent shaped coral reef. The order to move out goes to the sea bottom tanks in all the bases. Galactor approaches. When Jinpei fires the colouring liquid, the sea bottom becomes red as well and the radar becomes useless. When they learn that it's a fake base, the sea bottom tanks surfaces and head back to their bases. G-4 follows them with the radar and discovers six individual bases which the Science Ninja Team destroys completely. Jinpei follows the very big mecha of Katse, which is returning to the main base. Katse learns of his follower through a communication from X and, after firing torpedoes, sets the self-destruct mechanism and escapes. With the help of Jinpei's message, the Science Ninja Team follows Katse. But Ryu alone is worried about Jinpei, who is following the mecha, and follows him. Despite the fact that he's hurt when he puts himself between the G-4 and the torpedoes directed at it, they surface together, fleeing from the self-destruction of the mecha. The other three corner Katse's plane, but in the pilot's seat there's only a puppet. Once again, the Science Ninja Team has let Katse escape, but Ryu and Jinpei are in a cheerful mood.
90	"Matangar, the Armored Iron Beast"; Transliteration: "Sōkō Tetsujū Matangā" (Japanese: 装甲鉄獣マタンガー)	June 16, 1974
Joe, who is busily maintaining his weapon, is told by Ken that using weapons is a mistake, which results in a dispute. Before his father's grave, Ken is wondering whether, even if they defeat Galactor, a new evil organization will be born. On Mikron Island, there's an extinct volcano in the middle. Around it, seven evenly dispersed cities are expanding. The mecha Matanga takes position on top of the mountain, and sends a message to Nambu which says that it will attack a city every 12 hours as long as Nambu doesn't send the Science Ninja Team. The Science Ninja Team goes to the island, but Ken only takes consecutive photos of the mecha, and goes back to the base. He has the photos developed and examines them, looking for a weak point in the mecha. If they would blow up the mecha with its thick armour, the whole island would be destroyed as well. Soon, Ken notices that the mecha has a vent and asks Nambu to manufacture a special bullet. The Phoenix opposes the mecha, standing still in the air. At its tip, Joe aligns the Condor Machine, which is loaded with a single special bullet. Ken's instructions are to shoot the bullet through the vent, which measures a bit over one centimeter. The interior of the mecha then becomes a sea of fire. The mecha clutches the God Phoenix to its chest and heads for the sea. Ken, betting that the belly armour is thinner, has Jun's rocket fired into it from the top dome. Ken wins the bet. The mecha is blown up by the rocket.
91	"Completion of the Plan to Destroy the Crescent Base"; Transliteration: "Mikazuki Kichi Bakuha Keikaku Kanryō" (Japanese: 三日月基地爆破計画完了)	June 23, 1974
Galactor has a spy infiltrate a passenger ship with a lot of ISO engineers on board. He attaches a homing system to the ship and it is then blown up by firing torpedoes into it. Nambu, afraid that such an incident may happen again, sends the Science Ninja Team on a patrol. The God Phoenix dives at the spot where the ship sank and encounters crab-shaped tanks. Seizing the opportunity when the Science Ninja Team is distracted by the tanks, a submarine attaches itself to the belly of the God Phoenix. When the crab-shaped tanks are sure of this, they retreat. The Science Ninja Team doesn't trust this move, but they nevertheless go back to their base when Nambu orders them to do so. The Galactor submarine manages to easily sneak into Crescent Coral. The crew kills some engineers, disguise themselves and install the homing system in the base. The assaulted engineers are discovered and Nambu suspects that a homing system equal to that in the passenger ship has been installed. He orders Ken and Jun to find the system, and Joe and the rest to find the submarine which fires the torpedoes. Ken and Jun search the interior of the base, discover the Galactor members disguised as engineers and corner them. However, the Galactor members press a button, per Katse's instructions, which causes the submarine to blow up completely, destroying any one clues to the location of the tracking device. It's nearly impossible to search the huge base with its complicated layout. Elsewhere, the God Phoenix is searching the bottom of the sea, but it cannot detect the submarine which hides close by. Convinced of his victory, Katse's laughter resounds as torpedoes are launched towards Crescent Coral.
92	"The End of the Crescent Base"; Transliteration: "Mikazuki Kichi no Saigo" (Japanese: 三日月基地の最後)	June 30, 1974
One after the other, the torpedoes hit right on target. The props of the camouflaging coral reef get stuck in the base which loses its balances and starts sinking towards the bottom of the sea. Inside, the engineers don't want to just leave their research, but Ken and Jun convince them the really important thing is their lives. They make them escape. Meanwhile, while Nambu is destroying the data, a big computer falls over and traps his leg, rendering him immobile. The God Phoenix notices the sound of the explosions and returns to the base. After making sure of this, another group of torpedoes attack the base. Overturning, the base is caught on the wall of a deep-sea trench and the God Phoenix cannot escape from the hangar. Ken and Jun have managed to arrive at Nambu's room, but they can't open the door because the electrical system has been shut off. They sit down, awaiting their last hour. However, the base starts falling towards the deep-sea trench again and through this shock, the God Phoenix tears down the hangar's shutter and breaks into the interior. Joe and Jinpei go to Nambu's room, crossing flooded areas. They meet with Ken and Jun. With the burner in Joe's airgun they break open the door and rescue Nambu. The God Phoenix separates itself from the sinking base. The Science Ninja Team watches for a long time how the form of their own base sinks deep into the deep-sea trench. Nambu orders them to blast the base. When he tells them that it would be easy for Galactor to save data from the base in the deep-sea trench, Ken presses the firing button for the Bird Missiles. The basis of the Science Ninja Team, Crescent Coral, has ceased to exist.
93	"Counterattack! The Underground Torpedo Operation"; Transliteration: "Gyakushū! Chichū Gyorai Sakusen" (Japanese: 逆襲！地中魚雷作戦)	July 7, 1974
Katse is happy that he has defeated the Science Ninja Team. An order comes in from X to make sure that the Science Ninja Team is dead. Meanwhile, the Science Ninja Team spends its days at Nambu's villa. Without means to do anything after the heavy blow of losing the base, the data of the Mantel plan, and a place to produce missiles. Then, a message is received that a tourist city without any strategic value has been attacked. The Science Ninja Team wants to get mobilized, but Nambu stops them and leaves the field to the U.N. troops. Despite the attack on the city, the Science Ninja Team does not appear. Katse is convinced that the Team is dead and proceeds to his operation of destroying U.N. bases and factories with subterranean torpedoes. Based on the destroyed locations, Nambu derives where the torpedoes were launched from and sends the Science Ninja Team there. The Ninja Team sneaks into the base and discovers there a storage room for the torpedoes. Joe collects everybody's small detectors and installs them on the torpedoes. During the celebration for the destruction of the Science Ninja Team, Katse is in the middle of a speech with a tape in his hand that came in with X's latest plan for conquest. Katse and the Galactor members are startled by the Science Ninja Team appearing there. Seizing the opportunity, they grab the tape. Katse orders the torpedoes launched and the base destroyed, then flees from the base. The God Phoenix follows the mecha and fires the last Bird Missile. A transmitter has been installed in the missile and the torpodoes go one after the other in direction of the mecha. They bring the tape back to Nambu, but when they try to play it, it disintegrates in a column of white smoke.
94	"Angler, the Electric Devil Beast"; Transliteration: "Den Majū Angurā" (Japanese: 電魔獣アングラー)	July 14, 1974
The Torasshuu power plant provides electrical power to the city of Utoland. Nambu charges its head, Dr. Komibe, with the testing of whether a space capsule is fireproof or not, a test which requires the highly powerful incinerator of the plant. That evening, Ken and the others come to the station to say goodbye to Ryu, who is boarding the night train because his father is in critical condition. However, while Joe is heading towards the station, he hits a child and takes the child and its mother to the hospital. During a testflight for the mecha Angler, Katse lands by the power plant and forces them to recharge the mecha. This causes a blackout in the city. As a result, Ryu expects the re-establishment of power supply in the middle of the train; Joe in the hospital, where they are in the middle of the operation, the other three in a restaurant. But Ken and the others get suspicious at the length of the blackout. They go to the power plant. Katse, disguised as Komibe, throws the three of them into the incinerator and installs a pendant bomb inside the plant. The incinerator is fired up, but by fleeing into the capsule left by Nambu, they escape from the danger. They defeat the Galactor members who come to check on the situation. Jun then plans, with the help of Komibe, the re-establishment of the power supply and Ken attaches the pendant bomb discovered by Jinpei to his boomerang and throws it after the fleeing mecha. When Katse wants to blow up the power plant and presses the button, the mecha itself explodes. Power is restored to Utoland City. Ryu learns on the phone in the train that his father has overcome the critical condition. In the hospital, Joe is relieved by the fact that the operation on the child was a success.
95	"The Combined Ninjas, Giant Demon Man"; Transliteration: "Gattai Ninja Dai Majin" (Japanese: 合体忍者大魔人)	July 21, 1974
In the Jupiter mountains, there are ruins of a fortress which is said to have been erected by ninjas of ancient times. Some strange corpses are found. Nambu charges Jun, who is familiar with this region, with the investigation. Jun has found Jinpei in the Jupiter mountains. It was decided that this day would be Jinpei's birthday and it has been celebrated ever since. Despite that, Jinpei is in a bad mood that Jun has gone away this year because of the investigation. Ryu tells him that, since he doesn't know when his real birthday is, it doesn't matter when he celebrates it. Jinpei goes to the Jupiter mountains in order to research his real birthday and his origin. Jinpei sleeps in the hut of an old man he met, but they are attacked by a Ninja group. Jinpei learns from the old man, that he used to be one of those ninjas as well and that, because he opposed Katse, his eyes were crushed while the chief and his family were killed. Only one person, the son of the chief, who was three-years-old at that time, was missing. However, the old man says that if he were to meet that child, he wished he could convey him the message that knowing about one's origin is not lucky. Then, he breathes for the last time. Soon, Jinpei meets with Ken and the others, who have stolen the chariots of the ninja group and, led by the horses, hurried to the base together with Jun, who also sneaked into the base as well. They fight with the ninja group, who has been subdued by the Galactor army, and defeat the giant devil man, composed of the united ninjas, with the Tornado Fighter. They couldn't learn Jinpei's origin or his true birthday. But as a reparation, Ryu hands Jinpei a birthday present. The present has been crushed in the fight, but Jinpei is nevertheless satisfied.
96	"Storm Galactor's Headquarters!"; Transliteration: "Gyarakutā Honbu ni Totsunyū Seyo" (Japanese: ギャラクター本部に突入せよ)	July 28, 1974
When the ISO intelligence office analyses a horn of a mecha which fell into the Mammoth Canyon, they conclude that with 80% probability the Galactor Headquarters is at the upper course of the Lelo River. Because the river is a gorge, the God Phoenix cannot fly into it, and Ryu is left with the God Phoenix at the entrance of the gorge. The other four head towards the upper course of the river in a canoe. However, on their way there somebody interferes with them. Elsewhere, this also becomes a hindrance to the Galactor operation of displaying the headquarters, thus luring the Science Ninja Team there. They capture the man. Going up the river, they come across a sea deep below the earth, extending in the middle of a cave. However, it's the Galactor base. Just before the door in the ceiling closes, Jinpei escapes, but the other three are captured. Jinpei contacts the God Phoenix. Ryu is afraid somebody might listen in and pretends to be sleeping, does not answer the call. Then he secretly takes off and steers the God Phoenix towards the base. Caught in the base, the man hears what is said between the Science Ninja Team and Galactor. He seizes an opportunity and opens the ceiling. Jinpei immediately throws in a bomb and releases the bonds of Ken and the others. Taking the man with them, the four of them escape from the base. Ken orders to shoot a missile into the base. The Galactor base is blown up. The man, having been rescued, tells them that in a fight between Galactor and the Science Ninja Team, his willow at the bottom of the sea had been destroyed and he had taken it badly. However, he says that he made a mistake. Ken says that he knows that there are humans who are involved in his fight, and that the burden of his post weighs heavy on him.
97	"Leona 3, the Spaceship With No Tomorrow"; Transliteration: "Ashita Naki Uchūsen Reona San-Gō" (Japanese: 明日なき宇宙船 レオナ3号)	August 4, 1974
From the U.N. rocket launch site the two-man rocket, Leona 3, is launched in order to solve the mysteries of the Milky Way Nebula. Nambu leaves the launch site together with the president in a private plane, but then they are reported missing. The real president has been killed before the launch. Suddenly, Leona 3 deviates from its course. The control mechanism in both the machine and the control center has no effect. As it stands, it seems that the rocket will crash on the Shaku peninsula, resulting in 20,000 dead and injured people. The Science Ninja Team is charged with the search for Nambu, who participated in the development of the control mechanism. Nambu has been locked up in an atomic power plant on the Shaku peninsula. He gets in contact with a transmitter. Katse turns off the interfering radio waves on purpose, thus luring the Science Ninja Team there. Then he locks them up in the power plant together with Nambu. Telling them that Leona 3 will fall onto the plant, Katse escapes in a devil star disc plane. They have a narrow escape from the power plant, however, since it is already too late to correct the course of Leona 3, Nambu orders them to shoot a rocket at it. The crew of Leona 3 is already prepared and has cut the connection as well. Ken is at a loss. However, when Joe wants to press the button, Ken does it. Leona 3 disintegrates. Only the rosary, containing the last prayer of the crew, comes floating down towards Earth.
98	"Grape Bomber, the Spherical Iron Beast"; Transliteration: "Kyūkei Tetsujū Gurēpu Bonbā" (Japanese: 球形鉄獣グレープボンバー)	August 11, 1974
Joe, heading towards a meeting point, is blinded by a light reflection and runs into a woman. Seeing his mother's face in her, he takes care of her, but another blinding makes him feel afraid. At that time, the God Phoenix is forced into a tough battle because the G-2 is missing. Joe, having returned, does not mention that something is not right with his body, and acts up towards Nambu. Nambu orders him to rescue the young air pollution specialist, Mekker, who seems to be developing the mechas. Nambu also asks Ken to secretly help Joe. Joe boards a Bird Missile and the God Phoenix shoots it unnoticed into the mecha that has appeared. The mecha returns to the base. Joe sneaks into Mekker's room, accuses him of killing people with the poisonous gas he produced and knocks him down. Mekker wails that the world has ignored him, but that Galactor has appreciated and helped him. Joe provokes him, saying that he will let him take out the gun to shoot at him. Just when Mekker shoots, Joe is attacked by another blinding. However, Ken breaks in and saves him. From the speakers, Katse's voice comes out together with poisonous gas, and Mekker notices that he has been used. Ken and the others take Mekker with them and escape from the base. The mecha and the base are then blown up. After returning, Joe visits the woman's room. He's afraid that he may be taken off the Science Ninja Team because of his illness and that he won't be able to take his revenge.
99	"The Wounded G-2"; Transliteration: "Kizudarake no Jī-Ni-Gō" (Japanese: 傷だらけのG－2号)	August 18, 1974
The Science Ninja has pursued Katse and arrives at a base. X orders Katse to terminate the Science Ninja Team. They want to reciprocate when missiles are shot at them from the base, but Joe can't focus properly and therefore can't decide on a target either. The Bird Missile he shoots blindly destroys the upper part of the fortress. The five of them break into the base, but they are guided into a trap and are about to be buried under sand. They escape with the tornado fighter, but because of Joe's blinding, they fail the first time. Ken notices Joe's condition and orders him to stay on the alert in the God Phoenix. Joe goes back to the God Phoenix and is irritated because he has the enemy before his eyes and can't do anything. He punches a panel and causes his fist to bleed. Ken and the others discover an ammunition storage room and plan to use it to confuse the enemy, but through a trick of X, they are locked in a room with a drill attached to its bottom side. The room moves forward deep into the earth, heading towards the magma. Due to the drill's centrifugal force, there's nothing they can do. Ken contacts Joe in the God Phoenix, and tells him to shoot a Bird Missile equipped with a timing device right below the drill. When Joe says that he doesn't have self-confidence, Ken is convinced that something is not right with Joe's body. However, Ken tells him that he entrusts their lives to him and lets him know the location of the drill with a bird scramble. Joe prays that for one second everything will be well and back to normal. The eyes return to normal for a moment. Joe's fist punches hard on the launching button. The Science Ninja Team escapes alive and well, but Ken, without reason, feels afraid at the sight of the blood on Joe's hand.
100	"Gatchaman, 20 Years Later"; Transliteration: "Nijū Nengo no Gacchaman" (Japanese: 20年後のガッチャマン)	August 25, 1974
The Science Ninja has pursued Katse and arrives at a base. X orders Katse to terminate the Science Ninja Team.
101	"The Sniper Group Heavy Cobra"; Transliteration: "Sogeki Shūdan Hebī Kobura" (Japanese: 狙撃集団ヘビーコブラ)	September 1, 1974
Ken is worried about Joe's condition and Joe is afraid of being taken out of the fight. A fight between the two is interrupted by a message from Nambu. Secret ISO circuits are being tapped into and because of interfering electronic waves, the enemy cannot be determined. When Jun says that they may be able to determine the location if they use their bracelets; Joe wants to run off, but Ken stops him. Ken says that it's better to have only a couple and proposes that he goes together with Jun. Joe gets the order to be on standby and hands Ken his airgun. The two of them think that the helicopter on the roof of the ISO headquarters is suspicious. They get in and accompany it to the base where they recover the tape from Katse. However, they understand that the tape has already been copied. The two shoot a wire into the fleeing Devilstar disc, but they land in the middle of a big swamp where there's no place to hide. The two are chased around by Galactor mobiles. Tied up, they are dragged along behind the mobiles. Joe has been following the transmitter placed into the airgun, and shoots the ropes holding them. Joe shoots down one mobile after the other. The mobiles unite and change into a mecha, which Joe confronts in his G-2. Evading the rays of light, he shoots the head with the Condor Machine and blows it up. Joe's bold, smiling face has returned to Joe. However, his two opposing sides, self-confidence and puzzlement, are too much to bear.
102	"A Reversal! Checkmate X!"; Transliteration: "Gyakuten! Chekkumeito Ekkusu" (Japanese: 逆転！チェックメイトX)	September 8, 1974
A message comes in that a mecha has appeared, but since he can't contact Nambu, Ken goes out based on his own decision. But that mecha is bait to lure the team away from Nambu. Meanwhile, Joe visits an unlicensed doctor. The Female Commander appears, unnoticed by Joe. The doctor watches Nambu, who has locked himself up in his house, pushing his analysing work. Nambu is abducted by Galactor. Joe, who has visited the doctor again, sees the commander, follows her and arrives at the mecha where Nambu is held. Nambu says to the triumphant Katse that it's a pity that he can't reveal the true face of Katse, which he has been grasping for a month. At that moment, Joe comes storming in in order to save Nambu. He is shot by the Megazainer, the transformation is undone and he remains unconscious. He is surrounded by Galactor rifle muzzles. At that instance, the Science Ninja Team, who entered because of Joe's message, mows down the Galactor members. Katse aims the Megazainer again at the Science Ninja Team. Regaining consciousness, Joe shoots the wire of his airgun into the muzzle of the Megazainer, making it explode. The mask goes flying through the explosion's shockwave and Katse covers his face. Nambu trusts them the secret that Katse should have been born as twins, one male, one female, but he is a mutant. Just then, X shows his form before Nambu and the others. Ken hesitates for a moment to throw his boomerang at the fleeing Katse. The Science Ninja Team shudders at the existence and power of X.
103	"G-2 Risks Death"; Transliteration: "Shi wo Kaketa Jī-Ni-Gō" (Japanese: 死を賭けたG－2号)	September 15, 1974
His illness progresses and Joe goes racing at the track in order to shake off his fear. There, he is captured by Galactor and dragged before Katse. Katse presses him to reveal the true faces of his comrades. Because he declines, Joe goes mowing down the Galactor members who assaulted him, but he is attacked by another blinding. On the way to the cell, he escapes by jumping off the mecha, but he collapses on the street and is brought to a hospital. After regaining consciousness, Joe hears Nambu and the doctor talking on the phone and learns that he has about a week or ten days left to live. Galactor starts its last operation. Additionally, they start the Vibration operation as a bait. Everywhere on Earth, earthquakes of varying scale keep happening. Nambu gives the orders to investigate the relation between the earthquakes and Galactor, but Joe is left behind for a medical examination. Joe asks Ken to take the G-2 car with him. When the Science Ninja Team leaves, Joe sees a moment of carelessness by Nambu and runs away. Based on Katse's careless words, Joe finally reaches Cross Karakorum and is convinced that the headquarters are there. When he wants to contact Ken, his bracelet is smashed by a Galactor bullet. Joe fights with the Galactor members surrounding him. But finally he crumbles because of the Galactor bullets. At that time, in an observatory, the extinction of the star selector in the Andromeda nebula is observed.
104	"The Evil Grand Black Hole Operation"; Transliteration: "Ma no Burakku Hōru Dai Sakusen" (Japanese: 魔のブラックホール大作戦)	September 22, 1974
The mecha serving as bait is destroyed by the God Phoenix. Then, the order from Nambu to search Joe comes in. X is agitated because of the disappearance of Selector. He accidentally tells he will have the Earth extinguished and orders Katse to set the timer in the mantle. The order to return home goes out to the Science Ninja Team. It is said that the Earth is turning into a black hole, that neutron reactions have been happening. Nambu says that Galactor is causing nuclear explosions in the interior of the mantle layer. But they can't determine the location. At that moment, the message that the headquarters has been discovered is received by Ken's bracelet in morse code. Nambu suspects a trap, but sends the Science Ninja Team to follow the signal in the knowledge that it might be a trap. Those who are sending the signal are the two members of Red Impulse who sneaked into the headquarters. Joe is given a medication which lets him recover temporarily and is dragged before Katse. Hearing about the Black Hole Operation, Joe throws a feather shuriken in Katse's direction. But Katse evades it. It is then drawn into the interior of the machine by the counter. In the eye of the collapsed Joe, the God Phoenix on the screen is reflected. The God Phoenix has arrived, but the fog is dense and they don't know the entrance. Then the Red Impulse members appear and lead the Science Ninja Team. But they fall into a Galactor trap and the two men collapse under the bullets. The Science Ninja Team, with the volition of Red Impulse in their hearts, return to the outside. They split up in different directions, searching for the entrance.
105	"Earth's Destruction! 0002"; Transliteration: "Chikyū Shōmetsu! Zero-Zero-Zero-Ni" (Japanese: 地球消滅！0002)	September 29, 1974
Eerie stone statues appear in the fog. The Science Ninja Team walks around, searching for the entrance. Galactor is there and spreads out a radio net, waiting for a transmission to be sent. Joe, who has learned of the arrival of the Science Ninja Team, has mobilized his last forces and has sneaked out of the base, where people were trying to get away. In the middle of the fog, Jun is cornered by Galactor, but Joe's feather shuriken saves her. Through the radio communication, saying that Joe has been discovered, the four other team members gather around Joe, but his hour of death is already impending. Leaving some parting words, Joe tells them that the entrance to the base is here. Intercepting the radio communication, Galactor comes to shorten the harmony of the gathering. Ken and the others head toward the entrance, leaving Joe behind. Breaking in, they discover Katse and Ken demands that Katse must stop the operation. However, Sosai X interferes. He tells them that the Black Hole project has already started and Earth will be destroyed in 30 minutes. Katse is shocked because he believed Sosai X would give him world domination, not destruction. X tells them that the recent disappearance of his mother star caused him to change his plans. He launches himself into the black hole inside a giant pencil-shaped ship. The team tries everything to stop the mechanism. But Katse, in tears, says that he trusted X's instructions and never considered a control device. He throws himself into the magma surrounding Galactor's former headquarters. Ken still wants to climb into the mechanism and stop it, but Jun holds him off. At that moment, the feather shuriken that Joe threw at Katse in a previous episode loosens a gear wheel inside the machine. Because of a molecular bomb that exploded in the interior of the machine, the mechanism stands still. However, nobody knows that. Ken and the others go outside and stand still on the solid earth with no survivors around. Nambu reports the destruction of Galactor at a press conference. He says he does not know who or what Sosai X is, nor does he know what caused Sosai X to go to war with Earth. But Nambu requests that everybody considers that the core of evil may reside in anybody.
