= Battle of the Planets =

1978–1980 American adaptation of a Japanese anime series

- Based on: Science Ninja Team Gatchaman by Tatsuo Yoshida
- Developed by: Sandy Frank
- Directed by: David E. Hanson; Alan Dinehart
- Voices of: Casey Kasem; Keye Luke; Alan Young; Janet Waldo; Alan Dinehart; Ronnie Schell
- Narrated by: William Woodson (Opening Narration)
- Theme music composer: Hoyt Curtin
- Composers: Hoyt Curtin; Dennis Dreith; Richard Greene; Bob Sakuma
- Countries of origin: United States; Japan (o.v.)
- No. of episodes: 85 (list of episodes)

Production
- Executive producers: Jameson Brewer; Sandy Frank
- Producers: David E. Hanson; Alan Dinehart
- Animator: Tatsunoko Production
- Running time: 30 minutes
- Production companies: Sandy Frank Entertainment; Gallerie International Films

Original release
- Network: First-run syndication
- Release: September 12, 1978 – May 12, 1980

Battle of the Planets is an American adaptation of the Japanese anime series Science Ninja Team Gatchaman (1972). Of the 105 original Gatchaman episodes, 85 were used in the Battle of the Planets adaptation, produced by Sandy Frank Entertainment. The adaptation was generally faithful to the plot and character development of the original Gatchaman series, but significant additions and reductions were made in order to increase appeal to the North American television market of the late 1970s, as well as avoid controversy from parents; these included the removal of elements of graphic violence and profanity.

It was the most successful anime series in the United States during the 1970s, airing on 100 network affiliates during after-school hours by 1979. As of June 2013, Sentai Filmworks have licensed the Gatchaman franchise. An oft-delayed CGI film based on the franchise, Gatchaman, last slated for a 2011 release from Warner Bros., was officially canceled in June 2011. However, a live-action Gatchaman feature film was released in Japan in August 2013. As of 2018, the series has been made available for streaming on Hidive.

== History ==
In April 1977, TV producer Sandy Frank attended the MIP-TV conference in Cannes. It was here Frank first encountered the Japanese animation Gatchaman from producer Tatsunoko Production run by the Yoshida brothers. Frank committed to a Western release after seeing how successful the film Star Wars was in May 1977.

Battle of the Planets is the title of the American adaptation of this series created by Frank. New footage was authorized and Frank hired writers to add dialogue to fit the look of the animation, without reference to original scripts. Of the 105 original Gatchaman episodes, the adaptation used 85.

== Plot ==
Battle of the Planets cast five young people as G-Force, consisting of Mark, Jason, Princess, Keyop, and Tiny. G-Force protects Earth from the planet Spectra and other attacks from beyond space. The most prominent field commander of the Spectra forces was a villainous, masked individual known as Zoltar. Zoltar would receive his orders directly from a being he would refer to as the "Luminous One." The Luminous One would appear as a ghost-like, disembodied, floating head. While the Luminous One's origins were not explained on the show, it is clear he is the ruler of Spectra and its invading armies.

The main ship of the G-Force team was called the Phoenix, which could carry, transport, and deploy four smaller vehicles, each operated by one team member. The four vehicles included a futuristic race car with various hidden weapons driven by Jason; this vehicle was concealed within the Phoenix's nosecone. The "galacti-cycle," a futuristic motorcycle Princess rode, was stored within the left-wing capsule of the Phoenix. Keyop's "Space Bubble," an all-terrain, tank-like vehicle capable of VTOL as well as being a submersible craft, was held in the right storage capsule of the Phoenix. And lastly, a futuristic jet fighter Mark pilots was stored in the top rear section of the Phoenix command island structure, and which used its tail fin to make up the center tail fin of the Phoenix. The fifth crew member, Tiny, was assigned to pilot the Phoenix rather than one of the detachable craft.

A regularly featured plot device was the transformation of the Phoenix into a flaming bird-shaped craft able to handle virtually any exceptional situation for a brief period by essentially turning itself into pure energy called the Fiery Phoenix. The Phoenix's primary weapon was a supply of rockets called "TBX missiles" in the series. It also occasionally flaunted a powerful solar-powered energy blaster, although the team had the misfortune of choosing very cloudy days to use it.

The G-Force team themselves would use a combination of martial arts skills, ninja-like weapons, and their "cerebonic" powers to dispatch hordes of enemy soldiers and overcome other obstacles. Their bird-like costumes include wing-like capes that could fan out and function nearly identically to parachutes and/or wingsuits, enabling the G-Force members to drift or glide down to safety from heights that would otherwise prove fatal.

The G-Force members stay in contact through a wrist-band communicator device which also serves as a way for them to change or "transmute" instantly from their civilian clothes into their G-Force uniforms, and back again. Other weapons seen displayed by various team members include Mark's sonic boomerang, a bird-shaped boomerang with razor-sharp wings; Jason's and Tiny's multi-purpose gadget guns, which can be outfitted with grappling hook and line, drill bits, etc.; and Keyop's and Princess's yo-yo bombs, which could be used as bolas, darts, and explosive devices. Other weapons include feathers with a sharpened steel quill that could be used as deadly throwing darts and mini-grenades shaped like ball bearings with spike studs.

=== Key changes in the adaptation ===
The Battle of the Planets adaptation differs significantly from Gatchaman. The difference is due to heavy editing made to make the show appealing to the audience in the United States by removing controversial elements (i.e. graphic violence, profanity, and a gender changing mutant) while adding elements reminiscent of the feature film Star Wars, which was popular at the time. In fact, the name "Battle of the Planets" was an attempt to associate itself with the popularity of Star Wars. While the original Gatchaman was earthbound, dark-toned, and environmentally themed, the adaptation morphed it into a less violent outer space show with robot characters, although some environmental themes were kept, and this is also why the other planets to which G-Force traveled on missions looked very much like Earth. Setting, violence, objectionable language, and certain character fatalities were altered or eliminated by cutting scenes, dubbing, and explanatory voice-overs (for instance, claiming that the city had been evacuated before a battle scene that would show the incidental destruction of buildings and houses, as well as explaining away the destruction of the Earth armies and air forces as being robot tanks and fighter planes).

One of the most notable changes in the BotP adaptation involves the character Keyop (Jinpei in Gatchaman), who picked up a bizarre verbal tic of stuttering, chirping, and burbling every time he started to speak. There was a longstanding fan rumor that this was done because the original character spoke using much profanity and that Keyop's excess mouth motion would cover up deleting the words. This was not true, as demonstrated by the existence of an unedited Gatchaman version released by ADV Films in the US, in which Jinpei rarely, if ever, used profanity. The in-story explanation for Keyop's unique manner of speech is that he is an artificial life form with a speech impediment because of slightly defective genetic engineering.

The main villain, known as Zoltar in BotP, had an unusual background due to the gender changing mutant nature of the original Berg Katse character. In an episode where Katse's female half was featured (BotP title: "The Galaxy Girls"), she was introduced as a separate character, Zoltar's sister, for BotP. (A hint of her actual nature was retained in the name she used when masquerading as a human, Mala Latroz—"Latroz" is an anagram of "Zoltar.")

To compensate for the other differences, a robot named 7-Zark-7—who watched over G-Force from their base, Center Neptune—performed explanatory voiceovers and light comic relief, which not only padded the time lost from editing but also filled in the gaps in the storyline. This device bears the influence of contemporary Star Wars film, with 7-Zark-7 having a visual appearance not dissimilar from R2-D2, and a somewhat camp personality in the style of C-3PO. Notionally, 7-Zark-7 ran the undersea monitoring station Center Neptune, from where he received information regarding incoming threats to Earth and relayed that information to G-Force. Zark and other added characters, such as 1-Rover-1, Zark's robotic dog (who could hover from one side of the control room to the other by spinning his tail like a propeller, Muttley-style) and Susan (the early-warning computer whose sultry feminine voice often sent Zark into ecstasy) added to the cartoon's youth appeal. Some additional footage was also animated showing G-Force members Mark and Princess (using their Gatchaman model sheets) interacting with Zark, as well putting an image of Mark on a video screen in the control room, helping his addition blend more smoothly into the existing Gatchaman footage (although there is a clear difference in quality between the Zark and the Gatchaman animation).

=== Character variations ===
Team variations in different versions

Gatchaman	Battle of the Planets	G-Force	Eagle Riders	OVA (Harmony Gold dub)	Rank	Bird Uniform	Weapon	Mecha	Voice actor (Gatchaman)	Voice actor (Gatchaman OVA)	Voice actor (BotP)	Voice actor (G-Force)	Voice actor (Harmony Gold OVA dub)	Voice actor (Eagle Riders)	Voice actor (ADV TV/Sentai OVA dub)
Ken Washio	Mark	Ace Goodheart	Hunter Harris	Ken the Eagle	G1	Eagle	Razor boomerang	Airplane	Katsuji Mori	Masaya Onosaka	Casey Kasem	Sam Fontana	Eddie Frierson	Richard Cansino	Leraldo Anzaldua
George "Joe" Asakura	Jason	Dirk Daring	Joe Thax	Joe the Condor	G2	Condor	Pistol	Race Car	Isao Sasaki	Kōji Ishii	Ronnie Schell	Cam Clarke	Richard Cansino	Bryan Cranston	Brian Jepson
Jun	Princess	Agatha "Aggie" June	Kelly Jennar	June the Swan	G3	Swan	Yo-yo	Motorcycle	Kazuko Sugiyama	Michiko Neya	Janet Waldo	Barbara Goodson	Lara Cody	Heidi Noelle Lenhart	Kim Prause
Jinpei	Keyop	Pee Wee	Mickey Dugan	Jimmy the Falcon	G4	Swallow	Bolo	Dune Buggy	Yoku Shioya	Rica Matsumoto	Alan Young	Barbara Goodson	Mona Marshall	Mona Marshall	Luci Christian
Ryu Nakanishi	Tiny Harper	Hoot "Hooty" Owl	Ollie Keeawani	Rocky the Owl	G5	Owl	Pistol	God Phoenix	Shingo Kanemoto	Fumihiko Tachiki	Alan Dinehart	Jan Rabson/ Gregg Berger	Richard Epcar	Paul Schrier	Victor Carsrud

Character variations across different versions

Gatchaman	Battle of the Planets	G-Force	Eagle Riders	OVA (Harmony Gold Dub)	Voice actor (Gatchaman)	Voice actor (Gatchaman OVA)	Voice actor (BotP)	Voice actor (G-Force)	Voice actor (Eagle Riders)	Voice actor (Harmony Gold OVA dub)	Voice actor (ADV TV/Sentai OVA dub)
Dr. Kozaburo Nambu-hakase	Chief Anderson	Dr. Benjamin Brighthead	Dr. Thaddeus Keane	Dr. Kozaburo Nambu	Tōru Ōhira	Jan Rabson/Gregg Berger	Alan Dinehart	Ikuya Sawaki	Michael McConnohie	Greg O'Neill	Andy McAvin
ISO Director Anderson	President Kane	Anderson / Cmdr. Todd (some episodes)	Anderson	Director Anderson	Teiji Ōmiya	Jan Rabson/Gregg Berger	Alan Young	Yonehiko Kitagawa	Michael Forest		Marty Fleck
Red Impulse / Kentaro Washio	Col. Cronos	Red Impulse / Kendrick Goodheart	Red Impulse / Harley Harris	Red Spectre / Kentaro Washio	Cam Clarke	Bob Papenbrook	Keye Luke	Unshō Ishizuka		John Tyson	
Berg Katse	Zoltar	Galactor	Lukan	Solaris	Mikio Terashima	Bill Capizzi	Keye Luke	Kaneto Shiozawa	R. Martin Klein		Edwin Neal
Sosai (Leader) X	O Luminous One / The Great Spirit	Computor	Cybercom	Lord Zortek	Nobuo Tanaka	Jan Rabson/Gregg Berger	Keye Luke	Nobuo Tanaka	Ralph Votrais	Peter Spellos	Winston Parish
Gel Sadra			Mallanox		Masaru Ikeda						R. Martin Klein
Sylvie Pandora-hakase		Dr. Sylvie Pandora	Dr. Francine Aikens		Miyuka Ieda						Lara Cody
Announcer						Norm Prescott	William Woodson (Main) / Alan Young (Zark)	Hideo Kinoshita/Shūsei Nakamura			George Manley

Other notable changes

Variations	Gatchaman (Japanese)	Battle of the Planets	Guardians of Space	Eagle Riders	OVA (English, Harmony Gold)	Gatchaman (English)
Identity change command	Bird, go!‡	Transmute!	G-Force, transform!	Eagle Mode, now!	Ken / Eagle One, transform!; Joe / Shapeshift, Condor!; June / Swan Mode, now!; Jimmy / Falcon Tracker, transform!	Bird, go!
Enemy planet	Selectol	Spectra	Galactor	Vorak	Galactor	Selectol
Enemy civilization	Galactor (Gyarakutā)	Spectra	Galactor	Vorak	Galactor	Galactor

‡The original Japanese-language version of Gatchaman contains a small amount of English.

== Other media ==
=== Subsequent variations ===
Left to right: Mark, Tiny, Keyop, Princess, and Jason

In 1986, Gatchaman was re-worked in the US as G-Force: Guardians of Space by Turner, with a good deal of the original content edited out of Battle of the Planets put back into the show. It followed the plot of the original Gatchaman much more faithfully than Battle of the Planets because of this. Missing was Hoyt Curtin's original score. New voice acting was used.

Two soundtrack albums and several DVDs have been released.

The two Japanese follow-up series, Gatchaman II and Gatchaman Fighter, were combined into 65 episodes and released as the Saban-produced show Eagle Riders. All 65 episodes aired in Australia, but in the United States, only 13 episodes were aired.

=== TV movie ===
A TV movie called Battle of the Planets: The Movie was made by Gallerie International Films and Sandy Frank Film Syndication. David Bret Egen was the voice of 7-Zark-7. Several episodes were compiled to create a new storyline that contained violence as well as deaths. It was considered for an uncut remake of Battle of the Planets, but was scrapped when plans changed, as Frank began focusing efforts on arranging an uncut dub of Gatchaman instead.

=== Comic books ===
Battle of the Planets was also released in comic book form, originally by Gold Key Comics, but later revamped by Top Cow Productions. Among the Top Cow comic books was Battle of the Planets: Princess, written by David Wohl with art by Wilson Tortosa, released in 2002. A Battle of the Planets comic strip ran in the British TV Comic. The TV Comic issues which feature the Battle of the Planets strip run from #1530 (17 April 1981) to #1671 (30 December 1983). TV Comic also reprinted some of the Gold Key stories for two Battle of the Planets holiday specials and one TV Comic holiday special. There was also a Battle of the Planets Annual which reprinted some of the Gold Key stories.

== Voice cast ==
Apart from the pilot episode, Battle of the Planets featured a generic end credits sequence which only credited the regular cast, Alan Young, Casey Kasem, Janet Waldo, Ronnie Schell, Keye Luke and Alan Dinehart. But in addition to the regulars, several uncredited performers voiced secondary characters in many of the episodes. These include Takayo Fischer, William Woodson (who was also the announcer for the opening titles, episode previews and trailers), Frank Maxwell, Edward Andrews, Wendy Young (daughter of Alan Young), and David Jolliffe (who also voiced Jason in the pilot). The pilot episode features a different end credits sequence which also credits Jolliffe, William Woodson and Alan Oppenheimer. It is unclear which character Oppenheimer voiced in the episode (it may have been Gorok, the episode's villain; or it may have been Chief Anderson, who was cut from the final version of the episode), and he never worked on the series again.

Regular Cast:

- Alan Young as 7-Zark-7, Keyop, additional voices
- Casey Kasem as Mark, additional voices
- Ronnie Schell as Jason (regular voice), Tiny (episode 1), additional voices
- Keye Luke as Zoltar, the Spirit, Cronos, additional voices
- Janet Waldo as Princess, Susan, additional voices
- Alan Dinehart as Tiny (regular voice), Anderson, additional voices

Additional voices provided by:

- David Jolliffe Jason (episode 1), additional voices
- William Woodson announcer, additional voices
- Alan Oppenheimer additional voices, episode 1 only
- Edward Andrews additional voices (uncredited)
- Takayo Fischer additional voices (uncredited)
- Frank Maxwell additional voices (uncredited)
- Wendy Young additional voices (uncredited)

== Soundtrack ==
Battle of the Planets track listing

1. Main Theme – Title Card
2. Dramatic Curtain
3. Ready Room
4. Alien Trap
5. BP-Mysterioso 4 – BP-Mysterioso 3 – BP-Mysterioso 2
6. BP-Teenage Mysterioso
7. Love In The Afterburner
8. 7-Zark-7's Song – Zarks Theme Alt – Zark Disco
9. Keyops 1 – Robot Hijinks
10. Firefight
11. BP-Orion Cue #1 – Orion 4 – BP-Orion Runs
12. Alien Planet
13. Two Monsters – Star Fight
14. Alien Trouble – More Alien Trouble
15. Space On Fire
16. Phoenix Raising
17. BP-108
18. BP-101 Alt – The Robot's Dog
19. BP-Sneak-Up – BP-Bad Guys
20. Return To The Alien Planet
21. BP-600 – BP600 A
22. BP-101 – BP-106 – BP-107 – BP-2002
23. Come Out, Come Out
24. BP-105 – BP-2001
25. Melting Jets
26. BP-Dialogue – BP-2025 – BP-Mysterious – BP-2020 – BP-2002
27. The Chief Alien Shows Up - Victory
28. Main Title With Voice Over
29. Emblem G
30. Spectra Visions
31. Like The Phoenix
32. Coral Reef
33. Crescent Moon
34. Holding Up A Shad
35. Zoltar, Fastening The Armor
36. Fighter G
37. Red Illusion
38. The Earth Is Alone!
39. A Vow To The Sky
40. Countdown
41. Fighting Phoenix
42. Space Chase
43. BP-1 Zark's Theme
44. Alien Planet
45. BP-1000
46. Space Mummy Trailer
47. Space Serpent Trailer
48. The Ghost Ship Of Planet Mir Trailer
49. The Luminous One (Promo Spot)
50. G-Force Vs. Zoltar (Promo Spot)
51. 7-Zark-7 And Company (Promo Spot)
52. The Luminous One #2 (Promo Spot)
53. Commander Mark, Jason (Promo Spot)
54. Princess, Tiny, Keyop (Promo Spot)
55. Battle Of The Planes 04 (Remix) – Spray
56. The Ballad Of 7 Zark 7 (Remix) – Spray

== Reception ==
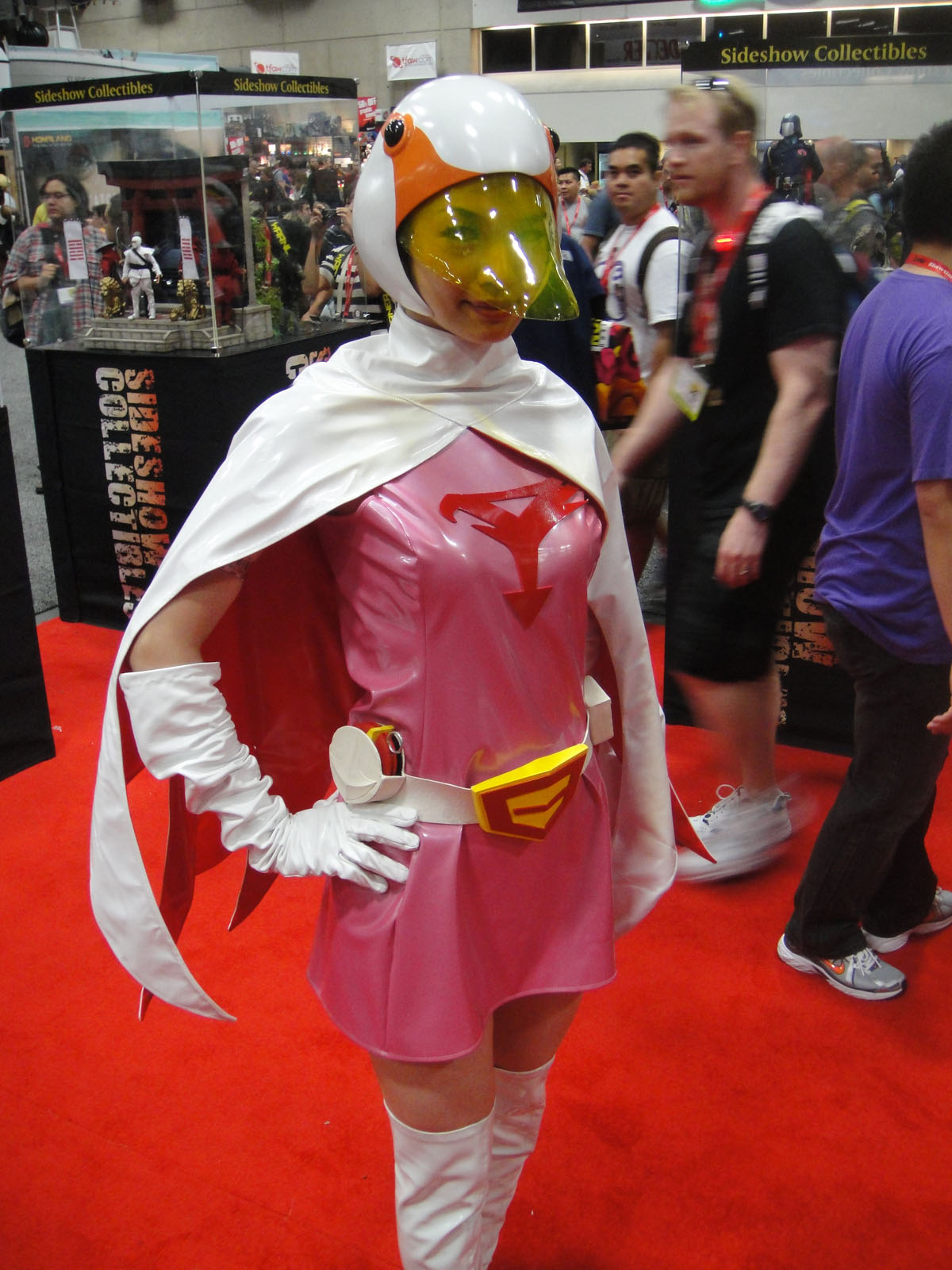
Princess cosplayer

In the United Kingdom, the show was voted #42 on Channel 4's 100 Greatest Kids' TV Shows in 2001.

The show was voted #62 on Channel 4's 100 Greatest Cartoons in 2004.

According to Wizard magazine, Battle of the Planets is considered to be one of the 100 greatest animated shows.

In 2009, IGN ranked BotP as the 44th-greatest animated show of all time in their Top 100 list.

== Legacy ==
=== Scrapped reboot ===
An animated reboot, with the working subtitle Phoenix Ninjas, was planned to have been produced by Nelvana, d-rights and Tatsunoko. Aimed at the 6-11 male demographic, the project was conceived when d-rights expressed interest in Nelvana rebooting the franchise following the success of the second generation of Beyblade. No new information on the project has surfaced since 2016 and has since been scrapped as Nelvana's parent company Corus Entertainment removed the press release from their official website.

=== Live-action film ===
It was announced at the 2019 San Diego Comic-Con that Joe and Anthony Russo are producing a live-action Battle of the Planets film through their production company, AGBO, with the possibility of directing. On July 22, 2021, it was announced the duo have brought Daniel Casey to write the script. In a video interview with AP Entertainment on July 1, 2022, Joe Russo said they are still working on the movie.
