= Gatchaman (disambiguation) =

Science Ninja Team Gatchaman is a Japanese animated franchise and 1972 TV series.

Gatchaman may also refer to:

- Science Ninja Team Gatchaman: The Movie, 1978
- Gatchaman (film), a 2013 film based on the TV show
- Gatchaman II, a 1978 sequel to the original TV show
  - Gatchaman Fighter, a 1979 sequel
- Gatchaman (OVA), a 1994 original video animation

== See also ==
- List of Gatchaman video games
- Battle of the Planets, a 1978 American adaptation of the Japanese anime series
  - G-Force: Guardians of Space, a 1986 American adaptation
- Eagle Riders, a 1996 American adaptation of Gatchaman II and Gatchaman Fighter
