= List of Battle of the Planets episodes =

Battle of the Planets episodes are listed below in their intended viewing order, recommended by the distributor Sandy Frank Entertainment. The first column on the right lists the production numbers for the original Japanese version Science Ninja Team Gatchaman, while the second column on the right lists the transmission numbers for the original U.S. broadcast of the series.

== Episodes ==
| BotP Episode Number | BotP Episode Title | Gatchaman Episode Number | BotP U.S. Transmission Number | Summary |
|---|---|---|---|---|
| 1 | "Attack of the Space Terrapin" | (1) | (15) | G-force's first mission is fighting the Spectra controlled Space Terrapin. |
| 2 | "Siege of the Squids" | (36) | (4) | Two boys and their father see the destruction of Federation survey ship by dozens of mechanical squids. The ship was drilling for Solodium for a new formula Zoltar wants. The young two boys, Poco and Peru join G-force to help infiltrate Spectra base inside a lighthouse. |
| 3 | "Decoys of Doom" | (62) | (7) | Chief Anderson has robot duplicates of G-Force to lure Spectra from its hidden Earth base. Mark without the other G-force members knowledge swaps places with his robot double and is captured by Spectra. |
| 4 | "Mad New Ruler of Spectra" | (21) | (14) | The Luminous one captures Professor Hugo Doriarity for Spectra in order to acquire his cyborg formula. Doriarity negotiates he will give the formula in exchange of being made ruler of the Planet Spectra. |
| 5 | "Peril of the Preying Mantis" | (75) | (12) | |
| 6 | "Giant from Planet Zyr" | (58) | (1) | |
| 7 | "The Thing with 1000 Eyes" | (15) | (9) | |
| 8 | "Fastest Gun in the Galaxy" | (57) | (13) | |
| 9 | "Panic of the Peacock" | (80) | (10) | |
| 10 | "Raid of the Space Octopus" | (67) | (3) | |
| 11 | "The Space Rock Concert" | (41) | (6) | |
| 12 | "Mammoth Shark Menace" | (55) | (18) | |
| 13 | "The Fiery Lava Giant" | (25) | (2) | |
| 14 | "Race Against Disaster" | (27) | (5) | |
| 15 | "A Whale Joins G-Force" | (18) | (11) | |
| 16 | "Rescue of the Astronauts" | (2) | (16) | Astronauts return to Earth after conducting resource surveys, but they and their data are captured by Spectra. |
| 17 | "Big Robot Gold Grab" | (6) | (19) | Mini robots sent by Spectra infiltrate the World Bank and steal all the gold reserves. G-Force is deployed to retrieve the stolen precious metal back from Spectra. |
| 18 | "The Musical Mummy" | (24) | (21) | |
| 19 | "Attack of the Alien Wasp" | (61) | (8) | |
| 20 | "The Space Safari" | (73) | (23) | |
| 21 | "Raid on a Nearby Planet" | (48) | (17) | |
| 22 | "The Ghostly Grasshopper" | (30) | (20) | |
| 23 | "Space Rocket Escort" | (11) | (22) | While he performs aerial maneuvers, Mark is surprised to cross the road of the leader of the Red Impulse Squadron. Both compete of skill in piloting their aircraft, but the pseudo duel is interrupted because the commander of G-Force must quickly join his teammates. |
| 24 | "Museum of Mystery" | (74) | (24) | |
| 25 | "Silent City" | (68) | (25) | |
| 26 | "Microfilm Mystery" | (16) | (26) | Spectra secretly takes over an automated factory and uses it to make a form-changing monster that menaces G-Force. |
| 27 | "Mission to Inner Space" | (83) | (27) | |
| 28 | "A Swarm of Robot Ants" | (10) | (28) | A vast army of tiny mecha ants destructively swarm power generating infrastructure. G-Force is tasked with stopping them. |
| 29 | "Cupid Does it to Keyop" | (87) | (29) | |
| 30 | "Raid of the Red Scorpion" | (54) | (30) | |
| 31 | "Spectra Space Spider" | (84) | (31) | |
| 32 | "Beast with a Sweet Tooth" | (12) | (32) | While working in a sugar cane field, a man is attacked by a giant beetle that seizes the harvest. ISO dispatches G-Force to stop the food-stealing monster that Spectra intends to cause a shortage of sugar. |
| 33 | "Raid on Riga" | (44) | (33) | Zoltar plays on G-force loyalties and sets out on distant planet Riga. |
| 34 | "Prisoners in Space" | (42) | (34) | |
| 35 | "Capture of the Galaxy Code" | (47) | (35) | |
| 36 | "Orion, Wonder Dog of Space" | (37) | (36) | |
| 37 | "Secret Island" | (59) | (37) | |
| 38 | "The Jupiter Moon Menace" | (9) | (38) | Spectra uses a new monster to create devastating meteor showers. Meteorites from destroyed cities are analyzed: it seems that they are coming from the Moon. G-Force is dispatched to thwart Spectra's plans. |
| 39 | "Seals of Sytron" | (45) | (39) | |
| 40 | "Ghost Ship of Planet Mir" | (5) | (40) | After several ships and their passengers disappear, G-Force is sent to the rescue, and finds a mysterious ghost ship may be involved. |
| 41 | "The Alien Bigfoot" | (71) | (41) | |
| 42 | "Super Space Spies" | (86) | (42) | |
| 43 | "Vacation on Venus" | (96) | (43) | |
| 44 | "Keyop Does it All" | (49) | (44) | |
| 45 | "Demons of the Desert" | (35) | (45) | |
| 46 | "The Space Serpent" | (4) | (46) | Spectra sends a mecha to steal the planet's oil reserves from ships and refineries. G-Force and the Phoenix are sent to eliminate the threat. |
| 47 | "Rockets out of Control" | (97) | (47) | |
| 48 | "The Space Mummy" | (3) | (48) | Mysterious plane crashes lead Chief Anderson to summon G-Force in order to solve the mystery. |
| 49 | "The Sea Dragon" | (22) | (49) | |
| 50 | "Perilous Pleasure Cruise" | (14) | (50) | |
| 51 | "G-Force in the Future" | (100) | (51) | |
| 52 | "The Awesome Armadillo" | (90) | (52) | |
| 53 | "Tentacles from Space" | (88) | (53) | |
| 54 | "Ace from Outer Space" | (7) | (54) | Mark has been selected to test a new ultra-sophisticated device and the team is there to cheer him on. It's attacked by a strange plane and crashes to the bottom of the ocean. G-Force join the Phooenix in order to carry it aid, before going in search of the strange device. and its equally strange pilot. |
| 55 | "Giant Space Bat" | (60) | (55) | |
| 56 | "The Great Brain Robbery" | (65) | (56) | |
| 57 | "Giant Gila Monster" | (46) | (57) | |
| 58 | "The Duplicate King" | (77) | (58) | |
| 59 | "Curse of the Cuttlefish, Part I" | (32) | (59) | |
| 60 | "Curse of the Cuttlefish, Part II" | (33) | (60) | |
| 61 | "Peril in the Pyramids" | (69) | (61) | |
| 62 | "Save the Space Colony" | (93) | (62) | |
| 63 | "Zoltar Strikes Out" | (63) | (63) | |
| 64 | "Magnetic Attraction" | (23) | (64) | |
| 65 | "Peaks of Planet Odin" | (51) | (65) | |
| 66 | "G-Force Defector" | (98) | (69) | |
| 67 | "Invasion of the Locusts" | (72) | (66) | |
| 68 | "Victims of the Hawk" | (43) | (67) | |
| 69 | "Island of Fear" | (89) | (68) | |
| 70 | "Strike at Spectra" | (99) | (73) | |
| 71 | "The Galaxy Girls" | (31) | (70) | |
| 72 | "The Conway Tape Tap" | (101) | (71) | |
| 73 | "The Awesome Ray Force" | (76) | (74) | |
| 74 | "Fearful Sea Anenome" | (8) | (72) | The ISO is constructing a new important underwater base of operations. Spectra is close to discovering the base, and G-Force is dispatched to prevent interference. |
| 75 | "The Alien Beetles" | (17) | (75) | Keyop and other children take home interesting beetles they find outdoors. Overnight, the beetles, designed by Spectra, each grow into giant mechas and kidnap children, including Keyop, to use their brainwaves for destruction. |
| 76 | "Defector to Spectra" | (79) | (76) | |
| 77 | "The Bat-Ray Bombers" | (26) | (78) | |
| 78 | "Rage of the Robotoids" | (70) | (77) | |
| 79 | "The Sky is Falling, Part I" | (52) | (82) | |
| 80 | "The Sky is Falling, Part II" | (53) | (83) | |
| 81 | "The Fierce Flowers, Part I" | (39) | (79) | A rain of flowers is coming down to Earth and no one seems to care. Nevertheless, They soon grow and transform into creatures venomous and carnivorous. |
| 82 | "The Fierce Flowers, Part II" | (40) | (80) | Back to basics, our heroes understand that not only the creatures were not destroyed, but on the contrary they continue to spread. Keyop is devastated at the thought that he will never see his big sister again and other members just as affected as him are unable to provide him with the comfort he needs. |
| 83 | "Charioteers of Changu" | (95) | (81) | |
| 84 | "Invasion of Space Center, Part I" | (91) | (84) | Agents from Spectra invade Space Center Neptune and put an electronic targeting advice. |
| 85 | "Invasion of Space Center, Part II" | (92) | (85) | Spectra missiles attack the undersea defence of Earth. Mark, Princess, and Chief Anderson and trapped in Space Center Neptune, while Jason, Tiny and Keyop on their ship the Phoenix. The trio decide to use the Phoenix to ram it into Space Centre Neptune in order to rescue their friends. |
