= Face the Music (American game show) =

American syndicated game show

- Onstage logo of Face the Music
- Created by: David Levy; Buddy Piper-Beverly Piper
- Developed by: Buddy Piper
- Directed by: Lou Tedesco
- Presented by: Ron Ely
- Announcer: Dave Williams (January–September, 1980); John Harlan (Season 2); Art James (substitute, Season 2)
- Country of origin: United States

Production
- Executive producer: David Levy
- Producers: Sandy Frank; Ray Horl; Peggy Touchstone
- Running time: 30 minutes
- Production company: Sandy Frank Productions

Original release
- Network: Syndicated
- Release: January 14, 1980 – September 1981

Face the Music is an American television game show that aired daily in syndication from January 14, 1980, to September 1981. The show was hosted by actor Ron Ely, with Dave Williams as announcer for the first season and John Harlan for the second with Art James as a substitute. The Tommy Oliver Orchestra, with Lisa Donovan as vocalist, was also featured. Face the Music was produced and distributed by Sandy Frank Productions.

The basic premise of Face the Music was a musical guessing game in the same vein as Name That Tune, which Frank was also distributing when Face the Music premiered and for whom Oliver had been the orchestra director during the mid-1970s. The twist, however, was that in addition to identifying the songs that the orchestra played, the contestants had to link the song titles to famous people, places, and things.

== Gameplay ==
On each episode three new contestants compete for the right to face a returning champion in the end game. The first part of the game was played in three rounds, referred on air by Ely as "Games".

=== Main game ===
==== Game 1 ====
The contestants were shown a montage of six pictures, mostly faces of famous people, although places and even fictional characters were shown at times. The band played a song, and the first contestant to buzz-in, give its title, and identify the face associated with it scored 10 points. The idea was to link the title with something closely linked to the famous face, such as "Happy Talk" for talk show host Johnny Carson. In another example, an actor (such as Rob Reiner or Carroll O'Connor) who appeared on a certain television series would be linked to the theme song from that series (in this case, All in the Family). A third example would be a song that the famous face performed, such as "Ready to Take a Chance Again" by Barry Manilow.

An incorrect guess carried no point penalty. However, a contestant who failed to correctly identify a song after buzzing-in was locked out of the next one. After the second song, the contestants would be shown the faces a second time. Game 1 was played until six songs were played or until time was called.

==== Game 2 ====
In Game 2, the contestants try to determine the identity of a subject, which fit a category given to the contestants (person, place, thing, fictional character, etc.), using song titles. For example, in the category of "fictional character", the songs "(I Can't Get No) Satisfaction", "The Teddy Bears' Picnic", "Go Away Little Girl", and "Band of Gold" all pertained to Goldilocks from "The Story of the Three Bears".

For each subject, a maximum of four songs would be played, and as in the first game, guessing the title of a song incorrectly locked the contestant out of the next musical clue. Correctly identifying the subject was worth 20 points, and the two contestants with the highest scores when time was called advanced to Game 3 to determine who would face the champion.

In the event of a tie for second place, a shortened version of Game 1 was played. Three pictures were shown to the tied contestants, after which a song played. The first contestant to name the song and identify the picture to which it applied advanced to Game 3. If all three contestants were tied, a second song was played to determine the second contestant who advanced.

==== Game 3 ====
In Game 3, the remaining two contestants again tried to guess subjects through use of song titles. This time, if a contestant did not correctly identify a song title the opposing player was given the chance to do so. Identifying the subject in this round was worth 30 points.

The player in the lead when time was called advanced to the Championship Game to face the champion while the other player won a consolation prize for advancing to the Game 3. As before, a tie was broken with a shortened version of the first game.

=== Championship Game ===
In the Championship Game, the reigning champion and the surviving contestant competed to identify a famous person using song titles and a series of six photographs of him/her from infancy through adulthood. Beginning in the second season, the contestants were also told whether the subject was a man or a woman. The champion and challenger would be shown the photographs one at a time with an accompanying song, and the first one of them to correctly identify the song and the subject won the championship.

For the first picture only, the contestant that identified the song was given ten seconds to study it. If the contestant identified the subject on the first try, he/she won $10,000 in cash (originally a prize package worth that amount). If not, the game continued with a prize package being offered to the eventual winner, starting out with a value of $5,000 for the second photo and decreasing by $1,000 for each subsequent turn, down to $1,000 for the sixth and last combination.

If neither contestant was able to identify the subject after all six photographs had been revealed, the tiebreaker from games 2 and 3 was played to determine the champion. The first contestant to correctly identify the song title and the celebrity associated with it won the $1,000 prize package.

In the first season, champions stayed on for up to ten games or until defeated. In the second season, champions stayed on until defeated, regardless of the number of wins. A champion was rewarded with a new automobile for winning five consecutive games. Reaching ten victories won a trip around the world during the first season and a travel trailer during season two.

== Episode status ==
Face the Music still exists in its entirety and has been previously rerun on CBN (July 2, 1984, to September 27, 1985, and January 6 to August 29, 1986), USA Network (January 2 to September 8, 1989, and March 26 to September 14, 1990), and The Family Channel (January 2 to September 29, 1995).

== Band members ==
Face the Music featured band members who also appeared on another show by Sandy Frank Productions, Name That Tune. The band members included pianist Michel Rubini, drummer Evan Diner, guitarists Tommy Tedesco and brothers Tom and John Morell, sax player Fred Selden, bass player Lyle Ritz, and trombonists Lew McCreary and Gil Falco. Tommy Oliver played electric piano in addition to conducting the group.

== International versions ==
Country	Name	Host	Network	Date premiered
Italy	Si La Sol	Paolo Limiti	Rai 1	October 2, 2000 – March 9, 2001
New Zealand	Face the Music	Simon Barnett	TV2	1992–1994
