= Turner Program Services =

American TV series syndication company

- Logo used from 1994 to 1996
- Predecessor: MGM/UA Entertainment Co. Television Distribution (for the pre-1986 library)
- Founded: 1982; 44 years ago United States
- Defunct: 1996; 30 years ago
- Fate: Dismantled, Program slate absorbed into Telepictures Distribution, which would be folded into Warner Bros. Domestic Television Distribution in 2003
- Successor: Warner Bros. Domestic Television Distribution
- Headquarters: United States
- Parent: Turner Broadcasting System

Turner Program Services was the syndication arm of Turner Broadcasting. It served the same purpose as Turner Entertainment Co.'s distribution unit, with the exception that TPS was more involved in distributing television series rather than films.

Founded in 1982, the company was originally responsible for syndicating Turner-produced programs (such as the syndicated game show Starcade) as well as developing programming for TBS such as Night Tracks. TPS expanded its distribution into other networks' series in the 1990s, syndicating series such as The Wonder Years (which is now owned by 20th Television since 2011). When Turner bought the rights to the Hanna-Barbera library of cartoons in 1991, TPS became their distributor to local stations. TPS was also responsible for handling distribution and sales for CNN Newsource.

One of the more notable series TPS was responsible for developing was Captain Planet and the Planeteers, which was a co-production with DiC Entertainment and centered on a character created by Turner Broadcasting founder Ted Turner. DiC and Turner combined on the development of the series while TPS was responsible for the distribution of the series, which aired on both TBS and in syndication. (When the series' sequel, The New Adventures of Captain Planet, debuted in 1993, Turner Entertainment Co., through Hanna-Barbera, developed and produced the series on its own, and neither TPS nor DiC was involved.)

Also, earlier in 1986, TPS, with the help of veteran anime translator Fred Ladd, produced a second English translation of the 1970s anime Science Ninja Team Gatchaman called G-Force: Guardians of Space, which would subsequently air on TBS (1986) and Cartoon Network (1995–1997). TPS also held partial distribution rights to G-Force (along with King Features Entertainment) until all rights to the series reverted to license holder Sandy Frank Entertainment in 2003. In 1987, Turner Program Services expanded to build on the pre-May 1986 MGM library with various film packages, provided by Turner Entertainment Co., as well as colorization of various older movie titles.

Upon Time Warner's purchase of Turner Broadcasting in 1996, TPS was dismantled with their program slate being absorbed into Telepictures Distribution, which is also now part of Warner Bros. Domestic Television Distribution (Telepictures still exists as a production company). CNN Newsource began to handle its own distribution and ad sales from then on.
