= Jan Rabson =

American actor (1954–2022)

- Born: June 14, 1954; East Meadow, New York, U.S.
- Died: October 13, 2022 (aged 68); Salt Spring Island, British Columbia, Canada
- Other names: Stanley Gurd, Jr.
- Occupation: Actor
- Years active: 1982–2022
- Spouse: Cindy Akers

Jan Rabson (June 14, 1954 – October 13, 2022) was an American actor. During his four-decade career, he appeared in over 100 titles. He frequently worked in voice over, including as Tetsuo Shima in the Streamline Pictures dub of the anime film Akira (1988) and Larry Laffer in the Leisure Suit Larry video game series (1993–2004; 2013–2020).

== Life and career ==
Rabson was born in East Meadow, New York, on June 14, 1954. Rabson's voice was in thousands of commercials, films, TV shows, and animated films and series. For many years, Jan was a member of Johnny Carson's "Mighty Carson Art Players", performing in on-camera sketches as well as providing the voices for answering machines, cash registers and other inanimate objects for Johnny's sketches. One of his more famous roles included providing the voice for Larry Laffer in Leisure Suit Larry 6: Shape Up or Slip Out!, Leisure Suit Larry: Love for Sail!, Leisure Suit Larry's Casino, Leisure Suit Larry: Magna Cum Laude, Leisure Suit Larry: Reloaded and Leisure Suit Larry: Wet Dreams Don't Dry.

Rabson performed in all of the Pixar Cars Toons shorts as well as Toy Story 3, Up, WALL-E, Cars, Finding Nemo and many more. In some of his anime dubbing and on-camera work, he used the name Stanley Gurd, Jr., and is best known for voicing Tetsuo Shima from the first English dub of Akira under that name. He is also the voice of Horse from the preschool series Slim Pig.

In 1988, Rabson was the first contestant and champion on Blackout.

In 2013, he reprised his role of Tetsuo Shima for AficionadosChris' review of Akira.

== Personal life and death ==
Rabson resided in Salt Spring Island, British Columbia, Canada and divided work between Vancouver and Los Angeles productions. He died of a heart attack on October 13, 2022, at the age of 68.

== Partial filmography ==
=== Television ===
Year	Title	Role	Notes
1982	One Day at a Time	Charlie	Episode: "Stick 'Em Up"
1982	The Facts of Life	Waiter	Episode: "New York, New York"
1982	Knight Rider	Charlie	Episode: "Not a Drop to Drink"
1983	Cheers	Director	Episode: "Now Pitching, Sam Malone"
1985	Hunter	Reporter	Episode: "The Big Fall"
1986	What's Happening Now!!	Murray	Episode: "Mr. First Nighter"
1987	G-Force: Guardians of Space	Hooty, Dr. Brighthead, Computer (voice)	English dub
1987, 1990	Night Court	Laughton, Mr. Borelli	2 episodes
1989	Designing Women	Man	Episode: "Manhunt"
1989	Just the Ten of Us	Rod Serling Lookalike	Episode: "Highway to Heaven"
1990	Growing Pains	Rod Serling	Episode: "Happy Halloween"
1991	James Bond Jr.	Gordon Leiter, Goldfinger, Jaws, Skullcap, The Worm, Snuffer (voice)	65 episodes
1991	Parker Lewis Can't Lose	Future Jerry	Episode: "Jerry's First Date"
1991–1993	Teenage Mutant Ninja Turtles	Kerma (voice)	4 episodes
1993	Animaniacs	Papa (voice)	Episode: "Hollywoodchuck"
1996	The Real Adventures of Jonny Quest	Avery, Donaldson (voice)	Episode: "Alligators and Okeechobee Vikings"
1996	Babylon 5	Vendor	Episode: "Interludes and Examinations"
1996	Baywatch	Frank	Episode: "Shark Fever"
1997	Pinky and the Brain	Farmer, Referee (voice)	2 episodes
1997	Almost Perfect	Man in Line	Episode: "Gimme Shelter"
1999	Batman Beyond	Rocketeer Leader (voice)	Episode: "Heroes"
1999	Beverly Hills, 90210	Sal	Episode: "Local Hero"
2002	Rugrats	Steve Malone, Weatherman (voice)	Episode: "Silent Angelica"
2002	Justice League	Professor Erlich (voice)	Episode: "Paradise Lost"
2008	Bratz	Principal Affleck (voice)	3 episodes
2011–2020	Superbook	Professor Quantum (voice)	20 episodes
2015	My Little Pony: Friendship Is Magic	Wind Rider (voice)	Episode: "Rarity Investigates!"

=== Film ===
Year	Title	Role	Notes
1982	Chasing Dreams	Scout	
1987	Royal Space Force: The Wings of Honnêamise	Dormuhot (voice)	English dub
1987	Fatal Attraction	Party Guest	
1989	Akira	Tetsuo Shima (voice)	Streamline Pictures English dub
1995	Toy Story	Mr. Mike, Gas Station Attendant (voice)	
1996	The Hunchback of Notre Dame	Frollo's Soldiers (voice)	
1996	Theodore Rex	Tina Rex (voice)	
1997	Hercules	Driver (voice)	
1998	A Bug's Life	Axle, Grasshopper (voice)	
1999	Toy Story 2	Japanese Businessman (voice)	
2001	Monsters, Inc.	Sushi Chef (voice)	
2003	Finding Nemo	Seagulls (voice)	
2004	Barbie as the Princess and the Pauper	Nack, Midas (voice)	
2005	A Fairy Tale Christmas	Crofton, Farmer (voice)	
2006	Cars	T.J. Hummer (voice)	
2007	Betsy Bubblegum's Journey Through Yummi-Land	Mayor Marshmallow (voice)	
2007	Bratz Super Babyz	Tuber, Announcer (voice)	
2008	Horton Hears a Who!	Town Cryer (voice)	
2008	WALL-E	Axiom Passenger (voice)	
2009	Up	Construction Worker, Television Announcer (voice)	
2009	Playmobil: The Secret of Pirate Island	Sea Biscuit, Voodoo Daddy (voice)	
2010	Toy Story 3	Sparks (voice)	
2011	Quest for Zhu	Zhu Fu, Mangawanga (voice)	
2013	Monsters University	Astronomy Club President (voice)	

=== Video games ===
Year	Title	Role	Notes
1993	Leisure Suit Larry 6: Shape Up or Slip Out!	Larry Laffer	
1994	Freddy Pharkas: Frontier Pharmacist	Sam Andreas, Wheaton Hall, Jim Laffer	
1996	Leisure Suit Larry: Love for Sail!	Larry Laffer	
1998	Leisure Suit Larry's Casino	Larry Laffer	
2004	Leisure Suit Larry: Magna Cum Laude	Larry Laffer	
2013	Leisure Suit Larry: Reloaded	Larry Laffer, Short Man	
2018	Leisure Suit Larry: Wet Dreams Don't Dry	Larry Laffer	
2020	Leisure Suit Larry: Wet Dreams Dry Twice	Larry Laffer	Final role
