= Jacob Holmes =

Australian basketball player

Personal information
- Born: 14 August 1983 (age 43) Adelaide, South Australia, Australia
- Listed height: 201 cm (6 ft 7 in)
- Listed weight: 94 kg (207 lb)

Career information
- High school: Heathfield (Heathfield, South Australia)
- Playing career: 2001–2015
- Position: Power forward
- Number: 12, 31

Career history
- 2001–2006: Adelaide 36ers
- 2005: Nelson Giants
- 2006–2008: South Dragons
- 2008–2011: Adelaide 36ers
- 2011–2015: Townsville Crocodiles

Career highlights
- NBL champion (2002); 3× Premier League champion (2004, 2010, 2015); 2× Premier League Grand Final MVP (2010, 2015); 3× Premier League Woollacott Medal (2003–2004, 2011); 6× Premier League All-Star Five (2002–2004, 2009–2011); NZNBL Co-Most Outstanding Forward (2005); NZNBL All-Star Five (2005)
Medals
Men's basketball
Representing Australia
Commonwealth Games
Gold medal – first place	2006 Melbourne

Jacob Holmes (born 14 August 1983) is an Australian former professional basketball player who played 14 seasons in the National Basketball League (NBL).

== Professional career ==
Holmes attended the Australian Institute of Sport from 2000 to 2001.

Holmes debut for the Adelaide 36ers in the during the 2001–02 NBL season and was a member of the teams' NBL championship win that year. Three more seasons followed with the 36ers where the Phil Smyth coached team never made it past the quarter-finals before he signed with the South Dragons for the 2006–07 NBL season. His leadership was acknowledged within the Dragons to the point where he earned the club captaincy as well as winning the Dragons MVP award for the 2007–08 season. Holmes also spent a season in New Zealand as an import for the Nelson Giants in 2005.

At the end of the 2007–08 season, Holmes decided to return home to Adelaide and re-joined the 36ers. In doing so, he missed out on a second NBL championship as the Dragons went on to win the 2008–09 NBL title in what would prove to be their final season in the league. During the 2010–11 NBL season, Holmes averaged 5.2 points, 6.8 rebounds and 2.9 assists per game for the 36ers in 28 games and was consistently among the top 10 in the league in rebounding.

Holmes signed with the Townsville Crocodiles late in the 2011 off-season as an injury replacement for Crocodiles captain, Russell Hinder. Holmes, who juggled his time between being a professional basketball player and a law student, made such an impact with the Crocodiles that halfway through the season the club announced they had signed Holmes for another two seasons.

On 5 June 2013, Holmes re-signed with the Crocodiles on a two-year deal.

On 16 January 2015, Holmes played his 400th NBL game. On 7 August 2015, he retired from professional basketball to continue on as the full-time president of the NBL Players Association. In 407 career games over 14 seasons, he averaged 8.8 points, 6.9 rebounds and 2.0 assists per game.

== National team career ==
Holmes was a member of the Australian Boomers team that won the 2005 FIBA Oceania Championship. He also won the gold medal playing for Australia at the 2006 Commonwealth Games held in Melbourne. Both championship wins were over the New Zealand Tall Blacks.

== Personal life ==
Holmes has two sisters, Fleur and Victoria. He and his wife, Conor, have one daughter named Addy. He currently serves on the board of the Australian Basketball Players' Association.
