= Australian Basketball Players' Association =

ABPA
- Australian Basketball Players' Association
- Founded: 2016 (predecessor organisations founded in the 1980s and 2000s)
- Location: Australia
- Key people: Greg O'Neill, Chairman
- Website: Australian Basketball Players' Association

The Australian Basketball Players’ Association (ABPA) is a player-run organisation that represents basketball players in Australia.

== Current administration ==
Greg O'Neill is the current chairman of the ABPA's board, with the other board members being Bert Bargeus, Jacob Holmes, Laura Hodges, Jenna O'Hea, Mitch McCarron and Cayla George.

== History ==
The Australian Basketball Players' Association was formed as the Australian Basketballers' Association in October 2016 from the foundations of the NBLPA and WNBLPA; formed in the 1980s, the NBLPA was one of the first player unions in Australian sport, while the WNBLPA was formed in the 2000s. The ABPA's objective is to grow the game and the players’ position as genuine partners in shaping the future of Australian Basketball, through representing, protecting, advocating and promoting Australia's basketball players in their best interests and for the benefit of basketball in Australia. The Australian Basketball Players' Association adopted its current name in 2019 as part of an organisational rebrand; the rebrand placed players as central to the organisations name and logo, in order to recognise that the players are at the heart of everything the organisation does.

In December 2018, the ABPA helped to negotiate the inaugural National Teams Collective Bargaining Agreement with Basketball Australia; the CBA will be in place until 2022, and provided improved working conditions, improved travel conditions, better contract provisions and protections, and a revenue share model.

After successfully negotiating a WMBL Parental and Pregnancy Care Policy in October 2018, in March 2019, the ABPA negotiated the WNBL's first ever Collective Bargaining Agreement, which provided an increase in the minimum payment for WNBL players in 2019, with WNBL players provided access to improved health care and other basic conditions such as advanced scheduling, improved travel conditions and professional services, as well as guaranteed a minimum base wage of $13,000 for the 2019–20 and 2020-20 WNBL seasons; this amounted to a 73% increase from the previous season.

In 2021, the ABPA committed $350,000 to a fund to support players who were directly impacted by the changes in salary and extension to the length of the NBL season as a result of COVID-19 pandemic-imposed changes.

In September 2023, the ABPA successfully negotiated a new Collective Bargaining Agreement with the NBL. Under the terms of the new CBA, the NBL Salary Cap and Floor will by 7% in 2023/24 and will continue to grow between 4% and 7% over the next two seasons, the minimum wage will increase in line with increases to the salary cap and floor, provides for a minimum of two Development Players at each club, provides greater protections incorporated into the Standard Player Contract, implements NBL and club contributions to the ABPA's Wellbeing and Engagement services for players, incorporating mental health, wellbeing, professional and personal development support and advice, as well as flexibility for future League expansion initiatives.
