= Norman Benson =

American radio and game show host

- Born: February 21, 1917; Columbus, Ohio, US
- Died: June 19, 1966 (aged 49)
- Education: Ohio State University
- Occupations: Radio personality and game show host
- Notable work: Name That Tune

Norman "Red" Benson (February 21, 1917 – June 19, 1966) was an American radio and game show host best known for serving as the original host of Name That Tune when it first premiered on NBC Radio in December 1952. In 1953, Name That Tune premiered on television as part of NBC's primetime lineup, also with Benson as host. In summer 1954, CBS picked up Name That Tune, with Bill Cullen replacing Benson as host. Cullen would host Name That Tune on CBS until its cancellation in 1959.

== Early life ==
Benson was born in Columbus, Ohio on February 21, 1917, and was a graduate of Ohio State University. He also served in the US Navy as a frogman in World War II before starting his television career.

== Career ==
Benson worked at WCAU radio and WEEU radio in Reading, Pennsylvania (a suburb of Philadelphia) before moving to New York City where he hosted several different network television programs including Name That Tune. After the NBC series ended, Benson returned to Philadelphia where he hosted a talk show on WPEN radio.

A member of ASCAP, he wrote several songs including "Rosalinda" and "Here Today, Gone Tomorrow."

== Personal life ==
Benson died at his home on June 19, 1966, at the age of 49.
