= George DeWitt =

American singer

George DeWitt (born George Florentine; December 30, 1922 – July 14, 1979) was an American singer and comedian, best known was the host of the 1950s musical quiz television program, Name That Tune, which featured contestants guessing the name of popular tunes from a limited number of notes. He later became a recording artist for RKO Records.

== Early life ==
DeWitt was born George Florentine in Atlantic City, New Jersey. He was the second of four children. DeWitt's father Joseph was a police sergeant with the Atlantic City Police Department. As a boy during the Great Depression, DeWitt would sing on the street corners in Atlantic City for tips. Later, as a young man during high school, he would work as a singing waiter in clubs around Atlantic City. DeWitt had two great passions: entertainment and learning to be a pilot, which he later did with the US Army Air Corps. He entertained in USO tours during WWII. His nightclub and theater stints afterward led to becoming one of the first comedians to open for Frank Sinatra.

== Music career ==
One evening during the 1950s at the 500 Club in Atlantic City, DeWitt entertained with the Rat Pack (Frank Sinatra, Dean Martin, Sammy Davis Jr.). While Davis was on stage impersonating Jack Benny, DeWitt walked out from the wings and ad-libbed an impersonation of Jack Benny's radio and TV valet Eddie "Rochester" Anderson.

In September 1953, DeWitt appeared with Sinatra and Bud and CeCe Robinson at Bill Miller's Riviera. DeWitt was known best as the emcee of the TV show Name That Tune. Originally produced by Harry Salter, Name That Tune ran from 1953 to 1959 on NBC and CBS in prime time. The first hosts were Red Benson and Bill Cullen, but DeWitt became most identified with the show.

DeWitt recorded two record albums during the show's run. The first, Name That Tune with George Dewitt was recorded in 1956. The second was titled George DeWitt Sings That Tune, recorded in 1957. CBS dropped the series in the wake of the quiz scandals, even though Name That Tune was not implicated as much as Twenty One or The $64,000 Question. DeWitt made a number of guest appearances on television, including an appearance on the Frank Sinatra variety TV show with the Three Stooges.

== Film and television ==
DeWitt was master of ceremonies of a late-night variety program on NBC that ended in 1951. He appeared in the movie A Hole in the Head with Frank Sinatra in 1959, as well as hosting another short-lived TV show called Be Our Guest during the 1960-1961 TV season and guest appearances on television shows such as The Gisele MacKenzie Show, Hawaiian Eye and Surfside 6 between 1960 and 1962. He spent the rest of the 1960s playing club dates in New York City, Miami Beach, and the Catskills (the Borscht Belt).

During the 1970s DeWitt retired from actively performing, choosing to "ghost write" for other comedians. DeWitt came out of retirement in 1974, appearing with Dustin Hoffman in the film Lenny, which was nominated for the Academy Award for Best Picture, Best Director, Best Actor, and Best Actress.

== Personal life and death ==
DeWitt married actress Claire Kelly in the early 1950s. They had a son, Jay Florentine, and later divorced. DeWitt died of a heart attack in Veterans Hospital in Miami in 1979, aged 56.
