= Lost Wages =

Lost Wages may refer to:

- A nickname for the city or urban area of Las Vegas, Nevada, referring to money losses by tourists due to gambling
- The fictional city, modelled after Las Vegas, in which the 1987 video game Leisure Suit Larry in the Land of the Lounge Lizards is set
- Pure economic losses of wages or finances
