= Name That Tune =

American music game show

- Also known as: The $100,000 Name That Tune (1976–1981); Celebrity Name That Tune (2023–present)
- Created by: Harry Salter
- Written by: Chris Newberg
- Directed by: Peter Ots (2021); Julian Smith (2022–present)
- Presented by: Red Benson; Bill Cullen; George DeWitt; Dennis James; Tom Kennedy; Jim Lange; Jane Krakowski
- Announcer: Johnny Olson; John Harlan; Randy Jackson; Robin Thicke
- Country of origin: United States
- Original language: English
- No. of seasons: 7 (1974–1981); 1 (1984–1985); 6 (2021–present)
- No. of episodes: 109 (NBC, 1974–1975); 114 (NBC, 1977); 195 (1984–1985); 77 (2021–present)

Production
- Executive producers: Harry Salter (1952–1959); Ralph Edwards (1974–1981); Sandy Frank (1984–1985); Chris Culvenor (2021); Paul Franklin (2021); Jane Krakowski (2021–present); Ralph Rubenstein (2021–present); Noah Rubenstein (2021–present); Janine Cooper (2021); Shane Byrne (2022–present); Sean O'Riordan (2022–present)
- Running time: approx. 26 minutes (1952–1985); 42–43 minutes (2021–present)
- Production companies: Ralph Edwards Productions (1974–1981); Sandy Frank Productions (1984–1985); Fox Alternative Entertainment (2021–2026); Fox Entertainment Studios (2026–present); Prestige Entertainment Group (2021–present); Eureka Productions (2021); BiggerStage (2022–present)

Original release
- Network: NBC (1952–1954, 1974–1975, 1977); CBS (1953–1959); Syndication (1974–1981, 1984–1985); Fox (2021–present)
- Release: December 20, 1952 – present

Related
- Name That Video

Name That Tune is an American television music game show. Originally created and produced by orchestra conductor Harry Salter and his wife Roberta Semple Salter, the series features contestants competing to correctly identify songs being played by an on-stage orchestra or band.

Name That Tune premiered on the NBC Radio Network in 1952, where it aired until 1954, and moved to television in 1953 on the same network. CBS aired the television series in the summer of 1954 and carried it through 1959.

A revival that started in 1974 was more successful than the original. Airing weekly, the 1974 syndicated offered a new show format and, beginning in 1976, offered a top prize of $100,000 to a lucky champion (after which the show became known as The $100,000 Name That Tune). Tom Kennedy hosted this series, which ran until 1981 and began airing twice weekly during its final season.

During the course of Kennedy's series, two attempts were made at reviving the series for network television, both on its original home at NBC. Dennis James hosted the first of these series, which ran daily for five months in daytime in 1974 and was canceled in early 1975. In 1977, a second daily daytime series with Kennedy hosting was conceived, but this was also short-lived and was canceled after six months.

Name That Tune returned in 1984 to syndication, again using the $100,000 prize in its branding. Hosted by Jim Lange, this revival was the first syndicated edition of Name That Tune not to air on a weekly basis from the start. Instead, the show aired as a daily series with some changes to the format, including the tournament structure. It did not find the success that its predecessor had in syndication and was canceled after one season in 1985.

In November 2020, Prestige Entertainment, Eureka Productions, and Fox announced a primetime version of Name That Tune hosted by actress Jane Krakowski with Randy Jackson as the bandleader, which premiered on January 6, 2021. The ten-episode first season was filmed in Australia with American contestants. Production moved to Ireland beginning with the second season, which premiered on March 29, 2022. In this season, four of the ten episodes featured celebrity contestants. A third season of the revival, titled Celebrity Name That Tune, premiered on January 11, 2023. A fourth season consisting of both celebrity and non-celebrity games began on June 3, 2024. A fifth season began on September 15, 2025, and a sixth season, which featured Robin Thicke as the new bandleader, premiered on September 21, 2026.

== Background and production ==
=== Development ===
Name That Tune had its conceptual origins in an earlier radio and television series, Stop the Music. Stop the Music was created by Mark Goodson, orchestra conductor Harry Salter, and advertising executive Howard Connell. Stop the Music relied on studio audience members and random telephone calls to potential viewers/listeners to identify melodies played by an orchestra. Name That Tune changed this idea to a competition between two onstage contestants.

Incarnations of Name That Tune over the years have maintained core concepts. These include an orchestra or a band, competitive contestant identification of songs played by that orchestra/band, and a bonus round known as the "Golden Medley", where the winner of the competition plays on their own for the episode's grand prize. Previous winners would sometimes return to identify songs for much larger prizes, in the 1950s television version the prize was $25,000, and by the 1970s, this grand prize was increased to $100,000.

==== Orchestra, band, dancers ====
Bob Alberti was the conductor of the orchestra for the first season of the 1970s run, with Tommy Oliver replacing him in 1975 and Stan Worth replacing Oliver in 1978. Beginning in 1977, the orchestra featured Kathie Lee Johnson as a vocalist. She left after one season and was replaced by Monica Pege of the singing group Lady Flash, who performed under the name Monica Burruss.

Also for the 1978–1979 season, the series featured choreographers Dennon Rawles and Jerri Fiala, who had also worked for show producer Ralph Edwards as hostess on The Cross-Wits, to serve as background dancers for that season only, although Fiala remained until the series ended in a similar role to the one she held on The Cross-Wits. Worth's orchestra was joined by The Sound System, a rock music ensemble led by Dan Sawyer with Steve March as its featured vocalist. They remained as part of the show through the final season in 1981.

In the 1984–1985 series, Tommy Oliver returned to lead the orchestra.

The first five seasons of the 2021 version featured musician, record executive and former American Idol judge Randy Jackson as the bandleader. In 2026, it was announced that singer and The Masked Singer panelist Robin Thicke would succeed Jackson as on-stage bandleader, with Jackson continuing to serve as music supervisor.

== Gameplay ==
=== 1950s version ===
In the 1950s version of Name That Tune, the contestants stood across the stage from two large ship's bells as the orchestra started playing tunes. When a contestant knew the tune, they ran across the stage to "ring the bell and name that tune". Four tunes were played every game, and each tune was worth increasing dollar amounts. The first tune was worth $5 and each subsequent tune was worth double the previous tune, up to $40 for the fourth and final tune. The contestant with the most money after four tunes won the game and played the "Golden Medley" bonus round. From 1955 to 1959, only three tunes were played, worth $10, $20 and $30. If both contestants were tied at $30 each, both played as a team in the Golden Medley.

==== Golden Medley ====
In the original series, all the tunes played were selected by home viewers. Each correct tune won money for the winning contestant as well as the home viewers. The first correct answer was worth $25, and each subsequent correct answer doubled the money. Naming all seven won $1,600 and gave a home viewer a chance to come to the New York studio where the show was taped at that time, and play along with the studio contestant in a special round called the "Golden Medley Marathon".

===== The Golden Medley Marathon =====
In the Golden Medley Marathon, the winning home viewer and the winning studio contestant worked as a team. This time, the two contestants had to correctly guess five tunes in 30 seconds, and if they did so they split $10,000 and returned the next week to try and do it again. They could return for up to four additional weeks, and potentially could win a combined $50,000.

The top prize for the prime time CBS show, by 1959, was $25,000.

=== 1974–1981 version ===
Two contestants selected from the studio audience compete in various song identification games to win points as well as cash and prizes. Three rounds were played per game, typically beginning with Melody Roulette, followed by a second game which varied by-episode, and culminating with Bid-a-Note. Each of the first two games awarded ten points to the winner, but Bid-a-Note was worth 20 points. A round's points were split between the contestants in the event of a tie. If the contestants were tied after the final competitive round, a single tiebreaker tune was played to determine who advanced to the Golden Medley bonus round for a chance at more prizes.

==== Melody Roulette ====
A wheel was spun onstage to determine a cash prize for identifying the tune. Early in both the daytime and syndicated versions the wheel contained categories. Each contestant selected a category before each spin and received $100 if the wheel stopped on their choice. However, the categories were later replaced by money amounts ranging from $20 to $1,000 from 1974 to 1976, $50–$1,000 from 1976 to 1977, and $50–$500 on the 1977 daytime series. The amounts were $100–$1,000 from 1977 to 1981 on the syndicated series. Also, after the switch to dollar amounts on the wheel, each contestant selected a space on the wheel (a $100 space in daytime, a $200 space in the syndicated series). If the wheel landed on one of those spaces, that contestant won that amount automatically prior to the start of the tune. This was discarded in 1976.

An outer wheel was added in 1976 which held two spaces marked "Double" and was spun in the opposite direction of the inner. From 1977 to 1980, it also featured a space offering a new car, but the car could be won only once per episode. In 1980, this was replaced by two generic "prize" spaces, which worked the same way, along with only one Double space. In order for a tune to be worth double the value or to have a prize on the line, the corresponding space had to be covering the space where the inner wheel had stopped.

Both contestants kept the cash they received.

==== Other games ====
These games were typically played during the second round:

- Build-a-Tune, played only on the short-lived 1977 daytime version, where the orchestra played a tune starting with minimal instrumentation and gradually added more until it became a full orchestral arrangement. Whoever named more tunes out of five received ten points and a prize package. If both contestants were tied, each received five points and the prizes.
- Cassette Roulette, played during the first few months of the 1970s syndicated version, where contestants alternated selecting categories for songs from a board of eight 8-track tapes. Seven tunes were played, and the contestant who correctly named the most tunes won the round and ten points. Four of the cassettes also contained a bonus prize, which would be awarded to the contestant who correctly named the tune.
- The Money Tree, where the contestants were both given a "tree" with 100 $1 bills on it. While one contestant tried to guess a tune, their opponent would remove bills from it as quickly as possible until that contestant guessed correctly or ran out of time. The contestant with the most money left on their tree at the end of the round received ten points and a prize package, although both trees sometimes had no money by the end of the round. The game was featured on the syndicated series from 1974 to 1977.
- Pick-a-Prize was another game played only on the 1977 daytime series, where the contestants were shown an assortment of prizes, then alternated between listening to tunes and trying to name them for a prize of their choice each time. The first contestant to name three tunes won the round and ten points.
- Pick-a-Tune, where each tune would feature a list of words that included the words in the tune's title. Contestants eliminated words so that only the words in the title remained. This game was featured early in the first season of the 1974 syndicated series.
- Ring That Bell was a recreation of the gameplay of the 1950s version, where contestants ran to and rang a bell in order to guess the tune. Five tunes were played, and the contestant who correctly guessed the most tunes won the round and ten points. This game was only featured on the 1974 daytime series.
- Sing-a-Tune, where both contestants guessed the song being sung by house vocalist Kathie Lee Johnson (who replaced any instance of its title in the lyrics with "la-las") by writing down the title. Five tunes were played and the winner of the round received ten points and a prize package. If contestants were tied, each received the prize package and five points. The game was played only during the 1977–1978 season, and was removed when Johnson left the show.

==== Bid-a-Note ====
Bid-a-Note has typically been the final competitive round of the show, except from 1978 to 1981 and during the 1984–1985 tournaments, when it was the penultimate round.

After being given a clue towards the song, the two contestants alternate bidding as to how few notes they need to identify it, starting as high as seven. Bidding ends when one contestant challenges the other to name the tune, or a bid of one note is given by a contestant to end the auction. The contestant receives one point for correctly identifying the song, while missing it gives the point to the opponent. The first to reach three points wins the game, and the winning point was won by a correct answer, not by default.

From 1978 to the end of the Kennedy run, contestants alternated choosing the tune to be played via displayed numbered packets.

==== Golden Medley ====
The Golden Medley is the main bonus round where the contestant must identify seven tunes within 30 seconds. The champion stops the clock by hitting a buzzer, a cue for the band to stop playing, and can either give an answer or pass if they are not sure. Once all seven tunes are played, the contestant may return to tunes passed in the original sequence in which they were played if time permits. The game ends when a contestant identifies all seven tunes, runs out of time, or gives an incorrect answer.

On the 1974 daytime series, the winning contestant had to correctly identify six (later five) tunes. Each correct guess won $200, and $2,000 was awarded if the contestant guessed all six in 30 seconds. No matter what the result of the Golden Medley was, the champion returned the next day and played until they had won five times or had been defeated. Any champion that made it to a fifth day won a car.

Later in the run, corresponding with the change to five tunes, a champion was required to win the Golden Medley in order to return the next day. The car was awarded if the champion successfully completed the Golden Medley four times.

On the syndicated series, each tune was worth $500 in cash or prizes (usually, a contestant who correctly named six won a car on the nighttime version), and any contestant who named all seven tunes won a $15,000 prize package. On the 1977 daytime version, each tune was worth $250, and all seven won a $2,500 prize package.

==== The $100,000 Mystery Tune ====
From 1976 to 1978, Golden Medley winners on the syndicated series were given a chance to win an additional $100,000 in cash at the conclusion of the next week's episode by guessing the $100,000 Mystery Tune. A safe filled with large, sealed manila envelopes was placed in a special room backstage called the "Gold Room", and one envelope was chosen at random. The producers made the choice in 1976, while the contestant did so effective 1977. Each envelope contained the sheet music for a mystery tune whose title had been blacked out, along with a smaller second envelope containing the title, composer name, and copyright/background information for the mystery tune.

Once an envelope was chosen, it was brought onstage by a security guard who gave the sheet music to orchestra pianist Michel Mencien and the inner envelope to host Kennedy. The contestant was then placed an isolation booth specially wired so that they could only hear Mencien and Kennedy, and Mencien played the mystery tune for 20 seconds. The contestant was then given ten seconds to offer one guess at the title, which was recorded on audiotape and replayed after Kennedy opened the inner envelope and read its contents aloud. An exact guess won the contestant $100,000, paid at $10,000 per year for the following ten years.

When Name That Tune returned to daytime in 1977, the Mystery Tune round was added and played according to the same rules as the syndicated version. The prize for correctly naming the tune was a lump sum of $25,000.

On days when the Mystery Tune was played, the front game was abbreviated in order to leave time for it, such as by making Bid-a-Note a best-of-three round instead of best-of-five.

==== $100,000 Tournaments ====
In 1977, eleven Golden Medley winners who did not correctly identify the Mystery Tune returned to play in a three week tournament where the winner would receive $100,000 in cash and prizes. In the first two weeks, five or six contestants competed in an otherwise normal game, except that in Melody Roulette, only the first two contestants to answer two tunes continued. Sing a Tune and Bid a Note were then played between the remaining two contestants for ten points each.

To determine the winner of the match, the Golden Medley became a competitive round of play instead of a bonus round and changed its name to the Golden Medley Showdown. The two contestants tried to identify as many songs as they could within the thirty second time limit. A tune was discarded if neither contestant buzzed in within five seconds.

The two winners returned on the third week, playing Melody Roulette, Sing a Tune, and Bid a Note for ten points each, and Golden Medley Showdown for 30, to determine the $100,000 winner. Unlike the mystery tune prize, this $100,000 was in cash and prizes. Runners-up won $2,500.

In 1978, the show (which had switched to a disco set and theme) discarded the Mystery Tunes and the entire season was set up to have four nine-week $100,000 tournaments. The first six weeks consisted of two-contestant games, featuring Melody Roulette, Bid-a-Note, and Golden Medley Showdown. The six winners returned for a three-week tournament, played like the 1977 tournament, except that three contestants played Melody Roulette and two of those contestants played the remaining two games. Every ninth episode would be a tournament final. The winner of each tournament won $10,000 a year for the following ten years, while the runner-up won a car. A number of celebrity specials filled out the season; the first season also had a 3-week tournament for the 1977 contestants that were unsuccessful identifying their Mystery Tunes.

=== 1984 version ===
Onstage logo used for the 1984 version

The show was revived in 1984 as a daily series, with some of the same elements of the 1970s series. Typical episodes featured Melody Roulette and the new game Tune Topics for ten points each, and Bid-a-Note for 20. The day's winner advanced to the Golden Medley, which if won, qualified the contestant for a monthly tournament for the grand prize.

Melody Roulette: The outer wheel had one Double space (except for the pilot week wheel, which had three). Initially, the wheels were spun before every tune to determine its value, with the inner wheel displaying amounts from $100 to $500 in increments of $100, and only the winner of the round kept their cash. The maximum number of tunes was seven in the earliest episodes, but was reduced to five shortly thereafter. In a further later change, the inner wheel displayed amounts from $250 to $1000 in increments of $250, and one spin determined the award for the winner of the round. The maximum number of tunes was increased back to seven temporarily, but by the series' cancelation was reduced again to five.

Tune Topics: This was the second game of the day on all episodes except for the pilot week. The orchestra would play a maximum of five tunes with a specific theme. Originally, one topic was exclusively shown, but it was quickly changed to a presentation where one of five categories was shown to be chosen at random. Ten points were given to the contestant who identified more tunes.

Tune Countdown: This was the second round for the pilot week, and was a 20-second version of the Golden Medley Showdown.

Bid-a-Note played the same, except the contestants no longer chose the clues by number. Bonus prizes were awarded to the winners of Tune Topics/Countdown and Bid-a-Note.

Golden Medley: Each tune was worth at least $250 in prizes, with an unspecified amount in prizes, usually including a vacation, awarded for naming all seven tunes, along with an entry into the monthly tournament.

$100,000 Tournament: Each episode varied in the number of contestants playing, which depended on how many of them qualified for the tournament. If more than two contestants were competing on any particular episode, a qualifying round was played in place of Melody Roulette, and the first two contestants to identify two tunes advanced to the next round. The two contestants then played Tune Topics and Bid-a-Note for ten points each and the Golden Medley Showdown for 20. For games with two contestants, they played Melody Roulette and Tune Topics for ten points each, Bid-a-Note for 20, and the Golden Medley Showdown for 40. The contestant with the most points at the end of the Golden Medley Showdown advanced in the tournament, with a sudden death tune played if necessary. The winner of each month's tournament won cash and prizes totaling $100,000, which included $10,000 cash and a Pontiac Fiero, while the runner up received a vacation for two to Hong Kong.

The series actually began with its first tournament, as fourteen former $100,000 winners from the previous series returned for another chance at $100,000. One difference featured the Golden Medley was played as normal for the first round of the tournament and the only way to advance was for a contestant to win it.

A home viewer sweepstakes was held in late 1984 in some non-tournament episodes. The day's champion would draw a postcard from inside a giant drum to determine whom the contestant would be playing for. Then, just before the Golden Medley began, the champion would draw a disk from inside a bin with the show's logo on it. One of the tournament prizes would be displayed on the disk and if the champion won, then the home viewer would win that prize.

=== 2021 version ===
Each hour-long episode consists of two complete games, with two new contestants per game playing for cash through two rounds. In each round, an incorrect response by one contestant gives the opponent a chance to steal the money. Bid-a-Note is always played as the second round. The high scorer at its end keeps their entire winnings total and advances to the Golden Medley for a chance to win up to $100,000 more. Tunes in all first-round games are played as toss-ups, open for either contestant to buzz in. One tune also awards a bonus prize, which the contestant keeps regardless of the final outcome of the game.

Celebrity contestants playing for charity are guaranteed $10,000.

Lyrics are sung in the first round, except for those that constitute the title. Six to eight tunes are played in each game, with each worth $1,000 (in the first season, tunes increased from $1,000 to $6,000). Some tunes missed by both contestants are edited out of the program.

The rotating first-round games include:

- By Request: A contestant chooses one category from a list of six or more, and a tune fitting it is played. The one who correctly names it gets to choose the next category, with the just-used one removed from the list.
- Mixtape: All tunes fit a single topic given by the host.
- On Shuffle: Contestants must name one tune by each of six different artists, chosen at random from a displayed list. Each artist is identified and removed from the list only after the tune has been named.
- Remix'd: Contestants must name a series of pop tunes as they are performed in a range of different styles. After a tune is correctly named, the house band performs it in its original style.
- Spin Me Round: An electronic wheel is spun before each turn to choose one of nine musical genres, and a tune from that genre is played.
- Title Track: Contestants must name tunes fitting a topic given by the host. Two topics are played, each with three tunes.
- Blank That Blank (introduced in season 3, and only used in some Celebrity episodes): A portion of the title for each tune is given before it is played.

Bid-a-Note is played second, with a maximum bid of ten notes. If the low bidder misses, the opponent must hear all ten notes before responding (rather than scoring by default as before). Four tunes are played, with the first one worth $5,000 and the value increasing by $5,000 per subsequent tune up to $20,000 ($10,000-$25,000 in season 1).

The high scorer advances to the Golden Medley, played as in earlier versions, with seven tunes to be named in 30 seconds and no vocals. The contestant wins $10,000 for each of the first six correct responses and an additional $40,000 for the seventh, for a top prize of $100,000. For civilian contestants, a wrong answer ends the round, but they keep any money won. For celebrity contestants, the first wrong answer forfeits the ability to win the $100,000, but they can still attempt the remaining tunes for a chance to win up to $60,000. A contestant may pass a tune and return to it after hearing all seven if time permits.

== Broadcast history ==
Name That Tune ran in prime time from 1953 to 1954 on NBC, with Red Benson hosting. It moved to CBS in fall 1954, and was hosted by Bill Cullen. Cullen was replaced by George DeWitt in fall 1955 until the show was canceled in October 1959. Notable contestants during this period included the singer Leslie Uggams and child actor Eddie Hodges, who were followed by Betty Leary, a contestant whose twelve children filled the first row in the studio theater for seven consecutive shows. The series finished at #30 in the Nielsen ratings for the 1956–57 season. On October 18, 1959, CBS canceled Name That Tune in following the quiz show scandals. Its final episode aired on October 19, 1959.

In 1974, the syndicated Name That Tune premiered, hosted by Tom Kennedy, and produced by Ralph Edwards in association with Sandy Frank Productions. It became The $100,000 Name That Tune in 1976 and continued until 1981.

Also in 1974, NBC broadcast a weekday version of Name That Tune for its daytime lineup, which ran from July 29, 1974, to January 3, 1975, and was hosted by Dennis James. A second iteration of the daytime version, this time hosted by Kennedy, ran on NBC from January 3 to June 10, 1977 (replacing the Kennedy-hosted 50 Grand Slam in its timeslot). Both were lower-paying versions of the concurrent syndicated version.

The New $100,000 Name That Tune returned to syndication as a weekday series in 1984, hosted by Jim Lange and produced by Sandy Frank. It was canceled after one season.

=== Episode status ===
The 1950s primetime versions are believed to have been lost. A handful of episodes have survived and clips have been shown on other programs.

The 1974–1975 and 1977 NBC daytime versions are believed to be deleted due to NBC's practice of removing daytime game shows during this time.

The 1974–1981 syndicated version is believed to be completely intact, but has never aired in reruns on national American television, both due to Ralph Edwards' refusal to sell the rights and music clearance issues. Clips from this version have aired on other shows.

The 1984 syndicated series is fully intact and was rerun on American television on a frequent basis for almost a decade. Christian Broadcasting Network (now Freeform) was the first to air reruns of the series, from September 2, 1985, to August 29, 1986. USA Network acquired the program on January 2, 1989, and aired it until September 13, 1991. It then returned to the renamed The Family Channel, which aired it from June 7, 1993, to March 29, 1996. Prestige Entertainment Group, the format's current distributor, holds the rights to the syndicated Kennedy and Lange versions.

Twenty episodes of the 1984 version were added to the streaming service Tubi in June 2021. They were removed in 2024.

== Revivals ==
During the 1996–1997 season, an attempt to revived the show was made by Quincy Jones-David Salzman Entertainment after their normal producing partner Warner Bros. declined the project, they later went to Columbia TriStar Television in an attempt to a possible collaboration with a revival of the game show Treasure Hunt but both projects were eventually canceled.

An unsuccessful attempt to revive the show occurred in 2001, with producer Phil Gurin. This would have been "a game-variety hybrid," such as incorporating live performances.

In October 2006, CBS ordered a pilot for a revival with Donny Osmond as host, but never aired as a series. This attempt would have included a new bonus round where contestants guessed 15 songs in 60 seconds for a chance at $1 million.

In October 2007, it was reported that MTV Networks had bought the rights to the series and planned to create concurrent versions of the show to air on MTV, VH1 and CMT in 2008. Their musical content was to be targeted to the networks' respective formats and audiences (for example, the CMT version would have focused on country music), and the show was to be "[reinterpreted] for the digital age" with new online elements. None of these efforts were successful.

In March 2012, it was reported that FremantleMedia had bought the rights and planned to revive the series. However, that plan was also canceled.

In October 2017, CBS ordered another pilot for a revival, this time with Elizabeth Banks as host. However, it was not ordered to series.

=== 2021 revival ===
In October 2020, it was reported that Eureka Productions and current rightsholder Prestige Entertainment were preparing to begin production of a new version of Name That Tune in Sydney, Australia for an unspecified network, with American Australians as contestants. It was filmed with a studio audience under local COVID-19 protocols. Filming began on November 17 at ICC Sydney.

On November 18, 2020, Fox officially announced the series, with actress Jane Krakowski as host and former American Idol judge Randy Jackson as bandleader. Premiering on January 6, 2021, to accompany the Masked Singer spin-off The Masked Dancer on its Wednesday-night lineup, the series broadcasts on Fox's programming slate with its similar series Beat Shazam. It was co-produced by Eureka, Prestige, and Fox Alternative Entertainment.

A second season premiered on March 29, 2022, which primarily features celebrity episodes. Production was moved to Dublin, Ireland at the RDS and Font Hill Studios, with BiggerStage (which had previously collaborated with Fox Alternative Entertainment on its new talent show format The Big Deal) replacing Eureka as co-production partner.

A third season titled Celebrity Name That Tune premiered on January 11, 2023.

A fourth season premiered on June 3, 2024, and a fifth season premiered in September 2025.

For the sixth season, Robin Thicke replaced Jackson as the bandleader.

== International versions ==
Country	Name	Presenter	Channel	Broadcast
Algeria	Famila		ENTV	2000s–2005
Australia	Name That Tune	Bruce Gyngell; Chuck Faulkner; Tony Barber; Stuart Wagstaff	TCN	1956–1957; 1975
Armenia	Գուշակիր մեղեդին Gushakir Meghedin	Avet Barseghyan	Armenia 1	2015–2016
Azerbaijan	Oyna Dostum	Elçin Cəfərov	Lider TV	2011–2012
Brazil	Qual é a Musica? (aired as a segment of Programa Silvio Santos)	Silvio Santos; Patrícia Abravanel	SBT	1976–1991; 1999–2008; 2023–present
Brazil	Desafio Musical	Gugu Liberato	Record	2013
Bulgaria	Коя е тази песен? Koya e tazi pesen?	Deo	BNT 1	2007
Bulgaria	Коя е тази песен? Koya e tazi pesen?	Kerana	bTV	2024
Canada	Fa Si La Chanter	Patrick Bourgeois	Radio-Canada	1996–1998
France	Fa Si La Chanter	Pascal Brunner; Cyril Hanouna	France 3	1994–2000; 2010
Germany	Hast du Töne?	Matthias Opdenhövel	VOX	1999–2001
Germany	Hast du Töne?	Matthias Opdenhövel	Sat.1	2024–present
Germany	Let the music play – Das Hit Quiz	Amiaz Habtu	Sat.1	2021–2022
Greece	Βρείτε τον σκοπό Vreite ton skopo	Kostas Tournas	Star Channel	1993
Greece	Νότα Μία; Nota Mia	Smaragda Karydi	Alpha TV	2017–2018
Hungary	Hangszáll	Róbert Sikora	M1	1998–1999
Indonesia	Berpacu Dalam Melodi	Koes Hendratmo	TVRI	1988–1998
Indonesia	Berpacu Dalam Melodi	Koes Hendratmo	Metro TV	2000–2005
Indonesia	Berpacu Dalam Melodi	Koes Hendratmo	TVRI	2013–2014
Indonesia	Berpacu Dalam Melodi	David Bayu Danangjaya	NET	2014–2016
Indonesia	Berpacu Dalam Melodi	David Bayu Danangjaya	Trans7	2017
Indonesia	Berpacu Dalam Melodi	Armand Maulana	iNews	2021
Indonesia	Berpacu Dalam Melodi	Gilang Dirga; Fara Dhilla	MNCTV	2025
Italy	Il Musichiere	Mario Riva	Programma Nazionale	1957–1960
Italy	Sarabanda	Enrico Papi	Italia 1	1997–2005; 2017
Italy	Sarabanda	Teo Mammucari and Belén Rodríguez; Enrico Papi	Canale 5	2009; 2025
Italy	Name That Tune – Indovina la canzone	Enrico Papi (2020–2021); Ciro Priello and Fabio Balsamo (2022–2023)	TV8	2020–2023
Italy	Sarabanda Celebrity	Enrico Papi	Italia 1	2025–present
Lebanon	شو إسم اللحن؟ Shwism allahna?	Maya Diab	LBCI	2024–present
Lithuania	Atspėk dainą	Beata Tiškevič and Arūnas Valinskas	LRT	2016–2017
Mongolia	Аяыг таа Ayaig taa	Bayarsaikhan Bold	Edutainment TV	2015–present
Morocco	Fa Si La	Imad Ntifi	2M	2003–2008
Poland	Jaka to melodia?	Robert Janowski (1997–2018, 2024–); Jacek Borkowski (April 2001); Norbert "Norbi" Dudziuk (2018–2019); Rafał Brzozowski (2019–2024)	TVP1	1997–present
Romania	Sarabanda	Horia Brenciu	TVR1	1999
Russia	Угадай мелодию Ugaday Melodiyu	Valdis Pelšs	Channel One Russia	1995–1999
Russia	Угадайка; Ugadayka	Valdis Pelšs	Channel One Russia	1999–2000
Russia	Угадай мелодию-II	Valdis Pelšs	Channel One Russia	2003–2005
Russia	Угадай мелодию-III	Valdis Pelšs	Channel One Russia	2013–2024
Spain	Valanota	Óscar Martínez	Telecinco	2008
Turkey	Bir Şarki Söyle	Berna Laçin	Kanal D	1998–1999
Ukraine	Яка то мелодія Yaka to melodiya	Kostyantyn Kirkaryan	Ukraine	2008
Ukraine	Вгадай мелодію Vhaday melodiyu	Mykhailo Khoma	Sweet.tv	2026–present
United Kingdom	Name That Tune	Tom O'Connor	ITV	1976–1983
United Kingdom	Name That Tune	Lionel Blair	ITV	1983–1987
United Kingdom	Name That Tune	Alison Hammond	ITV	2027 TBA
United Kingdom	Name That Tune	Jools Holland	Channel 5	1997–1998
United States (original format)	Name That Tune	Red Benson (1952–1954); Bill Cullen (1954–1955); George DeWitt (1955–1959)	NBC (1952–1954); CBS (1954–1959)	1952–1959
United States (original format)	Name That Tune	Dennis James (1974–1975 daytime); Tom Kennedy (1974–1981 nighttime, 1977 daytime)	Syndication	1974–1981
United States (original format)	Name That Tune	Jim Lange	Syndication	1984–1985
United States (original format)	Name That Tune	Jane Krakowski	Fox	2021–present
United States (original format)	Name That Video	Karyn Bryant	VH1	2001
Vietnam	Nốt Nhạc Vui	Thanh Bạch	Ho Chi Minh City Television	2004–2009

=== Germany ===
Hast du Töne? (Do you have sound?), hosted by Matthias Opdenhövel, aired daily on VOX from 1999 to 2001. Gameplay was somewhat different from the U.S. version, but the final round was the same as the Golden Medley. In 2024, the show was revived with six new episodes, Opdenhövel returning as host, and the same band as before. The contestants are all celebrities.

=== Russia ===
Ugaday Melodiyu (Guess the Tune), hosted by Valdis Pelšs, aired daily on ORT from 1995 to 1999. It was produced by the VID television company. The version was presented like the German version. Later, the series was presented as Ugadai i kompaniya (Guess and company) called Ugadaika (Guessing), also by Pelšs, but it was not as successful as the first version. In 2003, the program was revived and aired for two years on Channel One Russia. Gameplay remained the same and the only difference was the size of prizes.

On January 2, 2013, the program was once again revived, and since 2017, it has been aired during winter holidays. Starting in January 2023, the show continues to air without Fremantle's involvement in the production due to Russia's invasion of Ukraine.

=== Brazil ===
Qual é a Música? ("What Song Is It?" or "Which Song Is It?"), hosted by Silvio Santos, is the Brazilian version that aired on Sistema Brasileiro de Televisão for two decades. On June 4, 2023, a revival version of the show was broadcast as a segment of Programa Silvio Santos, which was hosted by Patricia Abravanel.

=== Italy ===
Il Musichiere (The Musician) aired on Saturdays from 1957 to 1960 on the then-called National Program, but it ended after the conductor Mario Riva accidentally fell from the stadium and subsequently died. Sarabanda (Sarabanda), aired from 1997 to 2004 and 2005 on Italia 1 and presented by Enrico Papi, in 2009 on Canale 5 by Teo Mammucari with participation of Belén Rodríguez and in 2017, on Italia 1 with the return of Enrico Papi, in some games he was inspired by the 1970s and 1980s versions of Name That Tune. Name That Tune, Indovina la canzone, which aired from September 2020 to March 2023 on TV8 in the first two editions with Papi, replaced in the third and fourth by Ciro Priello with the participation of Fabio Balsamo (both members of the comedy group of The Jackal), focused on the challenge between two teams of famous people in Italy: this formula mixes the variety and the quiz. Sarabanda Celebrity, which aired on Italia 1 in 2025, with Enrico Papi returning as host, follows the same format as Name That Tune, Indovina la canzone, while it reproposed the classic version of Sarabanda in the early evening slot on Canale 5.

=== Poland ===
Jaka to melodia? (What Melody Is It?) was first broadcast on September 4, 1997, on TVP1 and currently airs seven days a week. From 1997 to 2018, the show was hosted by Robert Janowski, an actor and singer. During the 2018–2019 season Norbi served as a host, but on September 7, 2019, he was replaced by Rafał Brzozowski.

The show combines a standard music quiz and musical performances performed by either the host, the in-house band and singers or guests (including artists who perform given song originally). Three contestants compete at the beginning of each episode which consists of four rounds (including the final round, Golden Medley). The grand prize for a finalist who successfully completes the Golden Medley is PLN 10,000 in a regular episode and PLN 80,000 in the finale of the month or the finale of the year (although formerly the grand prize of the finale was PLN 10,000 and a car). Typically, episodes aired on Saturdays and Sundays feature celebrities (unless the finale of the month is played), whose appearance on the show, and the style of episodes of that kind, is criticised by the program's fans.

=== Vietnam ===
The Vietnamese version was called Nốt nhạc vui (Happy Notes). 272 episodes of the show aired from January 14, 2004, to March 25, 2009. It became popular and was among the most-watched television series of Ho Chi Minh City Television. Thanh Bạch hosted that version.

=== Lebanon ===
شو إسم اللحن؟ (Name that Tune), is hosted by Maya Diab, airs weekly on Saturdays on LBCI starting on January 6, 2024. It is produced by the LBCI.

== Name That Video ==
Name That Video was a variation of the series that aired in 2001 on VH1. The show was hosted by Karyn Bryant and featured contestants competing to name song titles by viewing the music video.

== Merchandise ==
=== Arcade game ===
In 1986, a coin-operated arcade game based on the 1984 version of the show was released by Bally/Sente Technologies, created by Owen Rubin. The show's bandleader, Tommy Oliver, was hired as the game's music consultant. The contestant's task was to guess the tune being played from among four choices. It also featured a two-contestant mode.

While playable, critics and contestants considered the machine's difficulty to be high due to the technical limits of the very basic synthesized music the machine was capable of generating, and songs being too difficult to name mostly because the wrong audience was targeted as teenage contestants of the arcade era were not interested in trying to name songs from the 1940s through the 1970s. Critics also believed the game would have served better as a tabletop unit for bars and other adult-oriented entertainment establishments instead of as an arcade game.

The game only utilized three of the six games shown in the 1984 version of the show, Tune Topics, Bid-a-Note, and The Golden Medley. The game required the contestant to score 18,000 points, playing five tunes apiece in the Tune Topics and Bid-a-Note rounds. In Tune Topics, the contestant scored up to 990 points per tune based on how quickly they named it. In Bid-a-Note, the value of each tune was determined by how many notes the contestant requested, starting at 100 for nine and increasing by 100 for each note below that threshold (to a maximum of 900 for one). For both rounds, the contestant had to correctly name at least three out of five tunes in order to score a bonus that started at 9,900 points and counted down throughout the round.

If the contestant failed to score at least 18,000 points after both rounds, the game ended immediately. Reaching this minimum allowed the contestant to enter the Golden Medley, with the goal of naming five tunes in 15 seconds. Each tune had three choices instead of four. The fourth button could be used to pass. Tunes were scored as in Tune Topics, and successfully completing the round awarded a bonus as in the other two rounds. If time ran out or the contestant made an incorrect guess, the game ended and the bonus was forfeited.

Sente had developed several different upgrade chips for the game containing different musical selections and game modes, but these plans were canceled due to the game's failure.

=== Video game ===
A game based on the show was released for the short-lived CD-i home console. This version was hosted by Bob Goen and was based on the unsold 1990 Peter Allen version of the show. A game adaptation for the Game.com was announced, but never released.

=== Mobile phone game ===
In 2003, a mobile phone version of the game appeared on major U.S. cellular providers. The game follows the traditional format, with MIDI interpretations of popular and classic music played in short clips. The contestant then has several seconds to correctly identify the tune. Prizes such as free ringtones were available, a first in the mobile industry. The game is often mentioned as a pioneer in the emerging wireless entertainment industry.

=== DVD games ===
In 2005, Imagination Games released a DVD game called Name That Tune: 80s Edition. The DVD game featured elements from the game show, as well as Name That Video, such as the Bid-a-Vid round.

In 2007, Imagination Games re-released Name That Tune: 80s Edition, under the new name Name That Tune Eighties.
