= Greg O'Neill =

Australian businessman

- Born: Gregory Kevin O'Neill; Leongatha, Victoria, Australia
- Education: Monash University, Melbourne
- Occupation: Businessman
- Awards: Wealth Executive of Year Nomination (2011); Australian Entrepreneur of Year Nomination (2012); Social Media Power 50 (2013,2014,2015); Financial Services CEO of Year Winner (2016); Medal of the Order of Australia OAM (2019)

Gregory Kevin O'Neill is an Australian businessman who is chairman of Watermill Capital Partners, a private family office operating a portfolio of social impact investments and philanthropic ventures. He is also chairman of the Australian Basketball Players’ Association (ABPA). He was until 17 June 2022, the President, CEO and owner of La Trobe Financial, a credit asset manager with $14 billion assets under management. In 2011, O'Neill was nominated by Rainmaker Group as the 2011 Wealth Management Executive of the year. In 2016, O'Neill was the winner of the Financial Services CEO of the Year from CEO Magazine Australia.

O'Neill worked at La Trobe Financial from 1985 and assumed the position of CEO after a twelve-year apprenticeship in May 1997, succeeding his father Ray O'Neill, who founded the company in 1952. Upon Brookfield purchasing the business for $1.5 bn in 2022, O'Neill resigned as CEO and managing director, and now is Executive Chairman of Watermill Capital Partners.

== Early life and education ==
Gregory Kevin O'Neill, born the youngest of five children, grew up in the Gippsland, Victoria.

O’Neill completed a Bachelor of Economics & Econometrics at Monash University (1983), and in 2000 completed Securities Institute of Australia (SIA) Certificate of "Financial Planning – Principles & Practice".

== Career ==
In 1983 O'Neill joined the US based IT Company NCR Limited as an Account Manager. Thereafter he was recruited by Security Permanent Building Society (SPBS) in Melbourne then owned by Advance Bank of Australia Limited, before joining La Trobe Financial in 1985 as company secretary; La Trobe Financial at that point had $12m AUM and 8 staff.

In 1990 he was appointed, by the then Attorney General Jan Wade, to a government Advisory Committee on housing policy.

During the period 1992 – 2002 O’Neill was a member of the International Committee of the Mortgage Bankers Association of America (MBAA).

1998 saw O’Neill placed on the Finance experts Register at the Australian Institute of Banking and Finance (AIBF).

He was chairman (2006–2009) of the Melbourne Tigers Basketball Club Limited when the club appeared in all four finals of the Australian National Basketball League (NBL) winning two National Championships.

== Awards and honours ==
In 2012 he was nominated by Ernst & Young as Australian Entrepreneur of the Year, and contributor to Deloitte Access Economics Paper Domestic Fixed Income Assets in Australia (16 October 2012).

In 2013, 2014 & 2015 recognised by Financial Standard as one of the 50 most influential social media users in finance #gregceo in the FSPOWER50 rankings.

He was the 2015 & 2016 London Award recipient for Best Investment Management Company.

He was named 2016 CEO of the Year by CEO Magazine Australia (Financial Services).

He was 2017 Inaugural and current Chairman of the Australian Basketballers' Association.

He was awarded a 2019 The Medal of Order of Australia (OAM) for services to business and services to basketball.

In 2020 he was appointed by Senator Andrew Bragg to Australian Finance and Technology Centre Advisory Group.
