= Bill Capizzi =

American actor

- Capizzi in They Call Me Bruce?, 1982
- Born: March 21, 1937; Somerville, Massachusetts, U.S.
- Died: March 26, 2007 (aged 70); Scottsdale, Arizona, U.S.
- Other names: Bill Capeze; Bill Kapezi; A. Gregory

Bill Capizzi, also known as Bill Capezzoli, Bill Capeze, Bill Kapezi, and A. Gregory (March 21, 1937 – March 26, 2007), was an American voice actor. Born and raised in Somerville, Massachusetts, and also raised in North Hollywood, California. Capizzi appeared in mostly bit roles in his live-action film and TV show appearances. Also a gifted voice actor, he appeared in numerous animated projects, such as Digimon Adventure, Robotech and G-Force.

Capizzi died on March 26, 2007, in Scottsdale, Arizona, at the age of 70.

== Filmography ==
=== Anime ===
- American Hot Wax (1978) – Member of Singing Group in Front of Theater
- Bâsu (1984) – Raider (Streamline 1992) (as A. Gregory)
- Dôwa meita senshi Windaria (1986) – Caleb / Cord / Court / Tank / Walla (1987)
- Robotech (1985) – Robotech Masters / Konda / Colonel Maistroff / General Reinhardt
- Robotech: The Movie (1986) –
- Twilight of the Cockroaches (1987) – Takashi (1992)
- G-Force: Guardians of Space (1987, TV Series) – Galactor
- The Cockpit (1993)
- Teknoman (1995, TV Series)
- Digimon Adventure (1999-2000, TV Series) – Frigimon
- Mon Colle Knights (2000) – King Pezno the Penguin
- Shinzo (2000)
- Grimm's Fairy Tale Classics (1987-1988 TV Series) - Rumpelstiltskin

=== Films ===
- They Call Me Bruce? (1982) – Lil Pete
- What's Up, Hideous Sun Demon (1983) – George (voice)
- Katy La Oruga (1984) – Lenny (English version, voice)
- Peter-No-Tail in Americat (1985) - Max, Bull (English version, voice)
- Dutch Treat (1987) – Franco
- Summer School (1987) – Security Guard
- Heart and Souls (1993) – Race Track Ticket Clerk
- We're Back! A Dinosaur's Story (1993) – (voice)
- Don Juan DeMarco (1994) – Sultan
- In the Kingdom of the Blind, the Man with One Eye Is King (1995) – Cappy / Card Player
- Ed (1996) – Farley
- Bulletproof (1996) – Tommy
- Little Cobras: Operation Dalmatian (1997)
- True Friends (1998) – Sal
- Babe: Pig in the City (1998) – Snoop the Sniffer Dog
- Monkey Business (1998) – George
- Soccer Dog: The Movie (1999) – Vito
- Lansky (1999, TV Movie) – Joe Masseria
- Kiss Toledo Goodbye (1999) – Two-Ton Tony
- Mercy Streets (2000) – Hot Dog Vendor
- Made (2001) – Arthur
- Fish Don't Blink (2002) – Fat Louie (final film role)

=== Television ===
- The Incredible Hulk (1979) – Ben
- Tenspeed and Brown Shoe (1980)
- Knots Landing (1982) – Maitre D'
- T. J. Hooker (1983) – Armando
- Hunter (1984) – Georgie
- Street Hawk (1985) – Cabbie
- Murder, She Wrote (1987) – Doorman
- Bride of Boogedy (1987) – Pizza Man
- Major Dad (1989) – Ernie Buckholtz
- Night Court (1989-1992) – Dan Look-Alike / Mr. Poplinsky
- NYPD Blue (1995) – Fat Mike
- Tarzan: The Epic Adventures (1996) – Achmed

=== Video games ===
- Might and Magic: World of Xeen (1996)
- Grim Fandango (1998) – Maximino
