= Leisure Suit Larry: Reloaded =

2013 video game

- Developer: N-Fusion Interactive
- Publishers: Replay Games; Codemasters
- Designers: Al Lowe; Josh Mandel
- Composer: Austin Wintory
- Series: Leisure Suit Larry
- Engine: Unity
- Platforms: Linux; macOS; Windows; Android; iOS
- Release: Linux, macOS, Windows; (June 27, 2013); Android, iOS; (July 17, 2013)
- Genre: Adventure
- Mode: Single-player

Leisure Suit Larry: Reloaded is a point-and-click adventure game released on June 27, 2013, by N-Fusion Interactive, Intermarum and Replay Games working with series creator Al Lowe and intellectual property holder Codemasters. The game is available for Microsoft Windows via Steam and GOG, macOS, Linux, Android and iOS. It is an enhanced remake of the 1987 Sierra On-Line adventure game Leisure Suit Larry in the Land of the Lounge Lizards. It is the second remake of this game, following the 1991 remake, which featured VGA graphics.

Development was crowdfunded via Kickstarter, and claims the title of "first major video game to be released with funding from Kickstarter", being the first release among major crowdfunded games in the video game crowdfunding boom following the successful funding of Broken Age.

== Gameplay ==
A screenshot showing the game's starting location and its user interface

Like the first (1991) remake of Leisure Suit Larry in the Land of the Lounge Lizards, the game employs a point-and-click interface over the original 1987 version's text parser. The game consists of a variety of puzzles, which can be solved by looking at, picking up, licking, talking to or using items on a variety of objects and people in the game.

There are five buildings in the game: Lefty's Bar, a mini-mart, a love chapel, a multi-floor casino, and a disco club. The locations are fully explorable to the player from the beginning of the game, although somewhat limited by the money in Larry's wallet, as he needs to pay a cab fare to travel around. Larry can always earn additional money by gambling on the slot machines that are placed all over Lost Wages, but should he run entirely out of money, a local bum will take pity on him and hand him some change to help him get back on his feet.

== Plot ==
Plot-wise, the game is closely based on the original version; this extends to the time of the setting, which is still in the 1980s. Larry Laffer, an almost 40-year-old software salesman, having grown weary of his lonely life, has decided to travel to the resort city of Lost Wages (a parody of Las Vegas) in an attempt to lose his virginity and maybe even find true love. Certain characters were replaced or modernized, however, while others were cut from the game. The inventory run is also slightly different, preferring similar items to those used in the original version.

== Development ==
In October 2011, games publisher Replay Games announced a modern remake of Leisure Suit Larry in the Land of the Lounge Lizards, entitled Leisure Suit Larry: Reloaded (alternative title Leisure Suit Larry in the Land of the Lounge Lizards: the 25th Anniversary Edition), which would have updated HD graphics, fully vocalized audio and would be released on various platforms including home computers, games consoles and mobile devices, after reaching a licensing agreement with IP holder Codemasters. Replay Games originally planned to have an Israeli game studio Adventure Mob build a cross-platform game using the Unity game engine, but eventually the development was given to New Jersey–based studio N-Fusion Interactive.

To help the project along, a Kickstarter campaign was launched in early April 2012 during which $655,182 (the goal of the project was $500,000) was raised within 30 days from 14,081 backers. Several ex-Sierra Entertainment employees got involved with the project alongside Larry's creator Al Lowe, including Josh Mandel and Leslie Balfour. The soundtrack of the game was composed by Austin Wintory, a Grammy-nominated composer. The remake was promised by the Replay Games team to have an additional girl and expanded dialogue for trying certain things, which were promised to the players if the goal of $650,000 was reached.

Al Lowe stated: "One of our goals with doing this remake was not to do a remake. We didn't just want to port the game over with higher-res and better graphics. We wanted to do a much better game and it gave me a chance to fix some of the puzzles that I've hated for twenty-five years that I wish I had changed back when. ... And I'd like to say to all of those that pirated the [original Larry] games, we're going to give you a new chance to come clean and own up—man up—and buy a copy come January." Lowe also said that the rest of the Leisure Suit Larry series, or even other classic Sierra adventure games, might be remade if sales of this game enabled them to fund future titles.

The game was supposed to be released in October 2012, but once the Kickstarter campaign passed through the $650,000 goal, a new potential love interest was added to the game, a girl named Jasmine. The new content was scheduled for a March 2013 release, then delayed further to late May/June 2013. Al Lowe announced on June 18, 2013, that the final release date would be June 27, 2013, and Leisure Suit Larry: Reloaded appeared to be the first Kickstarter game to ship. The game was subsequently released for Android and iOS one month later on July 17. On November 24th, 2017, the game was delisted from Steam, possibly due to the license from Codemasters having expired.

== Reception ==
Reception

Aggregate scores
Aggregator	Score
GameRankings	54.70%
Metacritic	56/100

Review scores
Publication	Score
Adventure Gamers	4/5
Game Informer	6/10
GameSpot	4/10
GamesRadar+	2.5/5
Joystiq	3.5/5

Leisure Suit Larry: Reloaded received mixed or average reviews from critics. It has an aggregate score of 54.70% on GameRankings (as compared to 80.67% of the original version from 1987) and 56/100 on Metacritic. Nikola Suprak of Hardcore Gamer praised the game for being "a worthy remake that improves upon the original in every conceivable fashion," but Jason Venter of GameSpot criticized the game in his review for not having "enough new gameplay to hide the fact that the original Leisure Suit Larry game was every bit as shallow as its sexually frustrated protagonist."
