= Science Ninja Team Gatchaman =

Japanese anime television series

- Cover art by Alex Ross for the ADV Films release (DVD 18)
- 科学忍者隊ガッチャマン
- Genre: Action, Superhero
- Created by: Tatsuo Yoshida
- Directed by: Hisayuki Toriumi
- Music by: Bob Sakuma
- Country of origin: Japan
- Original language: Japanese
- No. of episodes: 105 (list of episodes)

Production
- Producer: Ippei Kuri
- Production company: Tatsunoko Production

Original release
- Network: FNS (Fuji TV)
- Release: October 1, 1972 – September 29, 1974

Science Ninja Team Gatchaman (科学忍者隊ガッチャマン, Kagaku Ninja-tai Gatchaman, lit. Science Ninja Squad Gatchaman), also simply titled as Gatchaman is a 1972 Japanese anime television series produced by Tatsunoko Production which aired on Fuji Television and its affiliates from October 1, 1972, to September 29, 1974, for 105 episodes. The series centers on a five-member superhero ninja team known as the Gatchaman as they save the world from the mysterious secret organization known as the Galactor.

Following its run on Fuji TV, Tatsunoko would license the show to Sandy Frank Syndication, owned by producer Sandy Frank, which would create an adaptation entitled Battle of the Planets, which aired in the US in syndication during 1978. The original series was dubbed into English twice with the 1986 dub by Turner Program Services and King Features Entertainment, titled G-Force: Guardians of Space and the 2005 ADV Films uncut release, both under license from Sandy Frank. Tatsunoko also uses the official translation Science Commando Gatchaman in related products and media.

The original Gatchaman series was followed by an animated film and two direct sequel series, Gatchaman II (1978) and Gatchaman Fighter (1979). During the 1990s, episodes from both series were dubbed into English by Saban Entertainment as Eagle Riders.

In the years since, the franchise has spawned many different productions, some that were left unproduced or evolved significantly from its development. This includes a 1994 original animated video remake, an unproduced 1998 television remake, a cancelled 2011 animated film reboot by Imagi Animation Studios, a 2013 Japanese live-action film reboot by Nikkatsu Studios, a comic book series by Mad Cave Studios, various spinoffs, re-imaginings, and merchandise.

== Original series ==
=== Plot ===
Recurring themes of Gatchaman involve conservation, environmentalism and the responsible use of technology for progress. The series centers around five young superhero ninja employed by Kōzaburō Nambu of the fictitious International Science Organization to oppose an international terrorist organization of technologically advanced villains (Galactor) who are trying to control Earth's natural resources, such as water, oil, sugar and uranium. The second-in-command of Galactor is an androgynous, masked antagonist named Berg Katse, who is later revealed to be a gender-shifting, genetically engineered mutant acting on the orders of the head of Galactor, Leader X, an alien Artificial Intelligence that is hell-bent on destroying the human race. The mechas produced by Galactor are often animal-based.

Most of the team are in their late teens, except for Jinpei (who is about ten or eleven years old). They include Ken Washio, the team leader and tactical expert; Jō Asakura, his second-in-command marksman and weapons expert; Jun, the team's electronics and demolitions expert; Jinpei, the youngest and the reconnaissance expert as well as an adopted brother of Jun; and Ryū Nakanishi, the ship's pilot. The main characters wear teen clothing with T-shirts numbered to show their rank in the team or caped, birdlike battle uniforms. The Science Ninja Team is often aided by a squadron of combat pilots led by and sharing the name of their enigmatic commander Red Impulse, who is later revealed as Ken's father.

The Gatchaman team employs a unique and effective martial art developed by Dr. Nambu, drawing on their ability to perform feats similar to their avian namesakes, such as high-speed running, flight, high jumping, and silent attacks. This fighting system, known as Science Ninja Technique (科学忍法, Kagaku Ninpō), is mentioned in the Japanese lyrics of the Gatchaman theme. The team members also use signature weapons and mecha-style vehicles, each with a mundane, disguised form. To change modes, each member is equipped with a wrist device that, in addition to communications and tracking, enables a change when the proper gesture and voice command ("Bird, go!") is given.

Their vehicles are docked in the team's main vehicle: the God Phoenix, a supersonic plane capable of underwater travel and space flight. The God Phoenix is armed with Bird Missiles, which are fired from a rack mounted atop the center section. After the original God Phoenix is destroyed by an octopus mecha, an improved version carries a pair of Super Bird Missiles in twin drop-down pods on the bottom center section. The ship also has an energy-beam weapon that opens the nose doors for the weapon apparatus mounted on the frame holding Joe's car; however, its solar power source is unreliable because of its sensitivity to cloud cover. The plane can also temporarily transform into a massive bird of flame (like the legendary phoenix) to escape danger or attack, although the process endangers the team because of extreme pressure in the passenger cabin and it consumes a great deal of fuel.

=== Characters ===
Left to right: Ken, Ryu, Jinpei, Jun and Joe

Ken the Eagle (G-1)
Ken Washio (鷲尾 健), a pilot, is the leader of the Science Ninja Team. "Gatchaman" designates the team leader. Ken's father disappeared during a flight, becoming Red Impulse. Ken did not know his father and was raised by Dr. Nambu.
Joe the Condor (G-2)
Joe Asakura (ジョー 浅倉), an Italian race car driver of Japanese descent, he is the sub-leader of the team. Joe was born George Asakura (ジョージ 浅倉, Jōji Asakura), the son of Giuseppe Asakura and his wife Caterina (members of Galactor, who were killed by a Galactor rose bomb when they tried to escape). Dr. Nambu rescued the boy, named him Joe to hide him from Galactor and raised him as his son.
Jun the Swan (G-3)
Jun (ジュン) is a Japanese-American girl. Raised in an orphanage, her last name is never disclosed in the anime. In her free time, she enjoys riding her motorcycle and runs Snack Bar J.
Jinpei the Swallow (G-4)
Jinpei (甚平) is also an orphan and grew up with Jun. His last name is not disclosed in the anime either, and he lives with Jun in Snack Bar J.
Ryu the Owl (G-5)
Ryu Nakanishi (中西竜), a fisherman's son, he is the manager of a yacht harbor and the main pilot of God Phoenix. He is the only person on the team with a family (parents and a younger brother).

=== Production ===
Created in the wake of the Henshin (transformation) boom begun by Shotaro Ishinomori's Kamen Rider in 1971, Gatchaman was conceived as a blending of ninja adventure with science fiction.

=== Film version ===
In 1978, Tatsunoko released a condensed theatrical compilation of the first two-story arcs in the series with additional new animation.

The film was released in English for the first time by Sentai Filmworks in 2015. The dub featured the cast reprising their roles from the ADV dub of the original TV anime for the film.

== Adaptations ==
After its broadcast in Japan, Gatchaman was later exported to other countries and translated into several languages. In Taiwan, beginning in 1977 it was known as Ke Xue Xiao Fei Xia (「科學小飛俠」/"科学小飞侠" kēxué xiǎofēixiá, Scientific Flying Fantasy Warriors).

The original series has seen several English adaptations with varying levels of modifications. Many of these versions later spawned foreign-language releases of their own:

=== Battle of the Planets ===
Sandy Frank and Jameson Brewer syndicated the series on American television in 1978, in heavily edited form, as Battle of the Planets (BOTP). In this version, the team was known as G-Force and protected the Earth from constant threats from the planet Spectra. Several scenes were replaced with new segments by Gallerie International Films, with additional characters: the robot 7-Zark-7 and his associates, 1-Rover-1 (a robot dog) and Susan (a sentient computer), all of which were stationed at the outpost Centre Neptune and provided both comic relief and linking narrative to the wider story. Other segments included the Phoenix flying in space. The quality of the new segments did not match the original content, with the G-Force and 7-Zark-7 never actually appearing together. New music by Hoyt Curtin was blended with the original soundtrack. Although all 105 episodes of Gatchaman were used as sources, only 85 episodes of BOTP were produced. An animated TV movie was made, combining several episodes into a new storyline. In 2003, Sandy Frank announced a series of eight compilation films that ultimately went unreleased.

Battle of the Planets was released on VHS and DVD from 2001 to 2003 by Rhino Entertainment in six volumes and a complete DVD collection. The DVD set includes a subtitled version of the corresponding Japanese episodes, alongside a single episode of the later English adaptation, G-Force. When Sentai Filmworks acquired the rights to Gatchaman in 2014, Battle of the Planets became available to stream on The Anime Network and temporarily on Hulu.

=== G-Force: Guardians of Space ===
G-Force: Guardians of Space (1986) is the second American adaptation of the anime Science Ninja Team Gatchaman (1972), following Sandy Frank Entertainment's Battle of the Planets (1978) and preceding ADV Films' 2005 Gatchaman. Five teenagers, Ace Goodheart, Dirk Daring, Agatha June, Pee Wee and Hoot Owl, battle Galactor and Computor to defend Earth.

As Battle of the Planets wound down in the mid-1980s, Sandy Frank Entertainment partnered with Turner Broadcasting to make a more faithful Gatchaman adaptation, feasible thanks to the relaxed television standards of the Reagan era. Turner brought in Fred Ladd (known for Astro Boy, Gigantor, Kimba the White Lion) to produce it through his company Sparklin' Entertainment. Two test pilots were approved and production began in autumn 1986. Sandy Frank kept the copyright and international rights; Turner Program Services and King Features Entertainment held limited distribution and syndication rights.

==== Changes and additions in the adaptation ====
Unlike Battle of the Planets, none of its American additions (7-Zark-7, 1-Rover-1, space-travel framing) were kept. Most plot, violence and deaths were retained, only softened where too explicit. Composer Dean Andre wrote a new score, kept some original 1970s music, and filled silent stretches with new cues, chiefly a repetitive synth instrumental derived from the theme song.

G-Force followed the original Gatchaman order, skipping only episodes 81 and 86, for 85 dubbed episodes. It never adapted the final 18, darker episodes, leaving no proper ending; reasons are unclear (contract limits, budget, or unsuitability for children). The two pilot episodes (Gatchaman #18 and #87) uniquely used all-new Dean Andre music rather than the original score, later abandoned. Between both US dubs, 99 of 105 Gatchaman episodes were adapted; ADV's 2005 release finally covered all 105.

Character names were newly Americanised rather than reused from Battle of the Planets. The heroes became Ace Goodheart (Mark), Dirk Daring (Jason), Agatha June (Princess), Pee Wee (Keyop), Hoot Owl (Tiny), and Dr. Brighthead (Chief Anderson); the villains became Galactor (Zoltar) and Computor (The Great Spirit). Only "G-Force" and "Phoenix" carried over from the earlier dub.

Pee Wee stayed close to the original child character Jinpei, unlike Battle of the Planets's altered Keyop. The Galactor–Computor relationship shifted from subordinate/master to master/consultant, partly due to religious objections to the "Great Spirit" framing. G-Force also had no episode title cards, unlike its predecessors.

It was produced and voice-directed by Fred Ladd; additional music by Dean Andre; post-production by Bruce Austin Productions; edited by Kurt Tiegs. Rights now belong to Warner Bros. Domestic Television Distribution and Hearst Television under license from Sandy Frank Entertainment after Sandy Frank's death on October 20, 2026.

The voice cast is Sam Fontana (Ace Goodheart), Cam Clarke (Dirk Daring/Red Impulse), Barbara Goodson (Agatha June/Pee Wee), Jan Rabson and Gregg Berger (Hoot Owl/Dr. Brighthead/Computor, split), Bill Capizzi (Galactor), Norm Prescott (announcer).

==== Debut and reception ====
- TBS run (1986): G-Force quietly premiered on WTBS in July 1987, airing for only a week before disappearing, likely to satisfy a contractual requirement ahead of international sales. It was then syndicated abroad while the US had no Gatchaman adaptation for eight years.
- Cartoon Network run (1995–1997; 2000; 2004): buoyed by the success of Mighty Morphin Power Rangers, G-Force properly debuted on Cartoon Network on 2 January 1995 alongside James Bond Jr., airing all 85 episodes. It was Cartoon Network's first anime, ahead of Robot Carnival, Vampire Hunter D and Twilight of the Cockroaches, and, with Speed Racer, helped pave the way for Toonami (1997). It moved to late-night/weekend slots in 1996 and was cancelled in mid-1997 for Toonami. Brief reruns followed in 2000 and 2004.

==== DVD releases and availability ====
Since ADV's uncut Gatchaman is now the more accurate adaptation, a full G-Force boxset is considered unlikely. Sandy Frank Entertainment lost distribution rights around 2007; these were reacquired by Sentai Filmworks, which has released the ADV dub and streamed Battle of the Planets, but has no plans to reissue G-Force. Only 13 of the 85 episodes have appeared on home video, across The Best of G-Force (Rhino, 2004, seven uncut episodes out of order), the eponymous G-Force: Guardians of Space (PAL DVD, 2003, first three episodes), and Battle of the Planets Volumes 1–6 (Rhino, 2001–02, one G-Force episode per volume as an extra).

=== Battle of the Planets: The New Exploits of G-Force ===
Development began for an uncensored version of Battle of the Planets. An animated TV movie was made (Battle of the Planets: The Movie, featuring David Bret Edgen as Zark), combining several episodes into a new storyline. In 2003, Sandy Frank announced a series of 8 compilation films that ultimately went unreleased. Sandy Frank announced a third English adaptation of the series in 2003 that was also never released. Battle of the Planets: The New Exploits of G-Force was set to be a 52-episode series encompassing content from the first 85 episodes of Gatchaman, the 20 previously unlocalized ones, and new CG animation produced by JulesWorld (including 7-Zark-7). The series would have been recorded at Ocean Studios in Vancouver, Canada and would have featured a new score and script to help modernize the show and create a tone in-between the two prior adaptations. While never released, the twenty-second episode of Gatchaman was adapted into a pilot called The Sea Dragon. It received two forms: one that focused on adventure and action and another that focused on comedy. At the time, this rendition of the show was sold as Battle of the Planets: The New Adventures of G-Force.

=== Battle of the Planets: Phoenix Ninjas ===
Battle of the Planets: Phoenix Ninjas is a scrapped reboot of the first American adaptation of Science Ninja Team Gatchaman. Tatsunoko partnered up with d-rights and Nelvana, a Canadian animation company owned by Corus Entertainment, on the project. The last new information on the project was in 2016 and it appears to be canceled.

== DVD releases ==
At Anime Central 2004, ADV Films announced that it had acquired the rights to release the series. In 2005, ADV released on DVD in 18 volumes (and nine limited-edition sets) containing a new uncut English dub and original Japanese audio with English subtitles under the name Gatchaman. This release included all 105 episodes. The dub aimed to be a faithful translation, without attempts to modify the show for younger viewers. The English dub contained creative changes: profanity, 1970s slang and thick, occasionally stereotypical accents were added.

The series was released on Blu-ray and DVD in Japan on October 19, 2012, with an all new remastered version.

Since then, Sentai Filmworks, a company founded by the creators of ADV, later signed a contract with Tatsunoko, acquiring the North American home video rights to the Gatchaman franchise in 2013. Section23 Films released a complete collection of the series on Blu-ray and DVD on December 10, 2013. The Blu-ray set contains 14 discs in three keep cases, and the DVD set has 22 discs in four cases. Both sets contain all 105 episodes of the original series (with the ADV English version and Japanese audio), it features new remastered (from the 2012 Japanese releases).

== Other series ==
=== Gatchaman II ===
A sequel, filmed with a different color process, was released four years later. Resembling the Blue Hawk, the new God Phoenix is larger and painted with the face of a bird. The personal mecha are also upgraded, with similar bird-designed paint jobs. Ryu has a tank-like mecha and a Pilot Machine to assist him.

Gatchaman II sees Sosai X turn a young shipwreck survivor into his newest commander Gel Sadra and resumes his plot to destroy the Earth. Gatchaman reunites with Joe, now a cyborg, after Galactor sends a spy to serve as his replacement on the team. The group is also aided by Dr. Pandora, who is revealed to be Gel Sadra's mother.

In the end, Sosai X is destroyed by Joe and Gel Sadra dies after betraying Sosai X, after the villain murders her mother.

Episodes from this series and Gatchaman Fighter were combined and translated into English as Eagle Riders in 1996 by Saban Entertainment. Gatchaman II served as the bulk of the series, though its ending is changed to have Gel Sadra turn into Gatchaman Fighter villain Egoblauser.

Another release in South Korea is Eagle 5 Brothers (독수리 5 형제, Dokksuri Hyeongje) which does not contain unusual changes in audio. Instead, it contains visual changes.

=== Gatchaman Fighter ===
This series aired in 1979, immediately after Gatchaman II. Here, the team's mecha bear no resemblance to birds. Earth is again threatened by evil; the mad tyrant Egoblauser (who has usurped control over the shattered forces of Galactor) and Sosai X, who has been reborn as Sosai Z.

Unlike Gatchaman II, Gatchaman Fighter is a much darker series, especially in the final episodes with regards to casualties and deaths of longtime series characters. The ending itself has Gatchaman presumed dead, sacrificing their lives to destroy Sosai X once and for all.

Select episodes from this series and Gatchaman II were combined and translated into English as Eagle Riders in 1996 by Saban Entertainment.

=== Gatchaman (OVA) ===
A 1994 original video animation remake series produced in association with Artmic that featured updated character designs and altered backgrounds.

Urban Vision released it on VHS in 1997 and DVD in 2001 with an English dub produced by Harmony Gold and Japanese audio with English subtitles. In 2013, Sentai Filmworks licensed the series and produced a new English dub from Seraphim Digital with the same cast as their ADV/Sentai's releases of the original series and film. The new dub was released on DVD and Blu-Ray and is available for streaming on The Anime Network.

=== New Gatchaman ===
New Gatchaman (新ガッチャマン, Shin Gatchaman) is a project that was attempted around the same time that Mach Go Go Go '97 was made. This version of Speed Racer was not so successful and as a result, it was canceled along with the project of Gatchaman '98.

=== NTT/SMAP Gatchaman ===
NTT Gatchaman was a series of commercials that were made to promote the Internet service provider NTT-East in fall 2000. Some of the commercials featured Japanese boy band group SMAP portraying live action versions of the characters, while the other two were animated by Tatsunoko Production and featured modernized costume redesigns of the Science Ninja Team. The animated commercials were directed by Keiichi Sato, with character designs by Kenji Hayama. A light novel based on these commercials were sent by e-mail by NTT-East as a gift for new subscribers. To this date, the contents of this light novel remain unknown. Based on sketches found on the Internet, fans have speculated if the commercials were an attempt to revive the franchise with a new anime. However, no such series was made at that time, and the franchise would not receive any new animated material for thirteen years until Gatchaman Crowds.

=== Good Morning Ninja Team Gatchaman ===
In 2011, Tatsunoko produced a series of 200 two-minute animated shorts called Good Morning Ninja Team Gatchaman (おはよう忍者隊ガッチャマン, Ohayō Ninja Tai Gatchaman) for broadcast on Nippon Television's Zip! television series. While the series used the original's designs, it was more comedic in nature and featured none of the original actors. The characters were instead voiced by Scha Dara Parr's Bose and Ani, along with actor Tomu Miyazaki.

Additional shorts were produced in promotion of the Japanese launch of Monster Hunter 3 Ultimate.

=== Gatchaman Crowds ===
A reboot of the Gatchaman series premiered in July 2013 on NTV. The story is set in Tachikawa City, Tokyo, where some of its residents have been chosen to join a team to confront a mysterious entity known as MESS. The series follows Hajime Ichinose, a 16-year-old girl who is the team's newest member. A second season, titled Gatchaman Crowds insight, started airing on July 6, 2015.

As it aired in Japan, both seasons of the show were simulcast on Crunchyroll. Sentai Filmworks licensed and dubbed both seasons. They released them on home video between 2014 and 2016.

=== Crossovers ===
Ken the Eagle and Jun the Swan, along other Tatsunoko superheroes were featured on the PlayStation video game Tatsunoko Fight developed by Takara and released in 2000.

Super deformed animal versions of the Gatchaman team appeared alongside similar renditions of Tatsunoko's Casshan and Golden Lightan in Tachimals Theater (たちゅまる劇場, Tachumaru Gekijō). The 26-episode anime series ran on Yomiuri TV between from October 4, 2010, and March 28, 2011.

On March 26, 2016, Tatsunoko announced a collaboration with Digital Frontier to create the Infini-T Force 3D CGI anime project. The team features members from Gatchaman alongside Tekkaman, Casshan and Hurricane Polymar. Set for release in 2017 alongside Tatsunoko's 55th anniversary, the project will contain an original story and will not be an adaptation of Ukyō Kodachi and Tatsuma Ejiri's Infini-T Force: Writing Line of the Future (Infini-T Force 未来の描線, Infini-T Force ~Mirai no Byōsen~) manga series.

== Film adaptations ==
=== Canceled Imagi film ===
Imagi began developing a film version in 2004, with producer Tom Gray saying that it would have a PG-13 or R rating. A Gatchaman film was first announced in February 2006, with an expected 2008 release. Kevin Munroe (TMNT) was scheduled to write and direct, with Lynne Southerland (co-director of Mulan 2) as producer, and an initial treatment was begun. However, in 2008 Munroe was taken off the project to direct Dylan Dog along with creative differences with Imagi & Warner Bros., who were planning to distribute the movie. Although early scripts were written by Paul Dini, in fall 2007 he was released from the project. In June 2007, Robert Mark Kamen was signed to write the screenplay in preparation for a 2008 release.

At the July 2008 Comic-Con, Imagi introduced a Paul Dini-scripted trailer. In August, art director Felix Ip began posting screenshots from the trailer. At the July 2009 Anime Expo, Imagi shared another 45-second, Dini-scripted trailer. Although it did not reveal much plot, it was the first public look at the 3D characterizations of the main villain Galactor and the Gatchaman team in and out of costume. The trailer also introduced the film's theme: "A world in chaos, an alien evil, a lone warrior is found; Earth's last hope, five shall rise, Gatchaman." In July 2009 Imagi posted a new one-minute trailer for Gatchaman on its company website, with a release date of 2011.

In December 2009, auditors reported growing concerns with the half-year results posted by Imagi. Although the company said that it was on course for the release of Astro Boy, according to the audit firm "It is uncertain whether the group will have the necessary financial resources to complete [the films] Gatchaman, Tusker, and Cat Tale." In January 2009, the auditing firm announced that the studio lacked funding for the release of Tusker, Cat Tale and Gatchaman, although Felix Ip reported that Gatchaman was expected to be released later in 2009. In June 2009, Imagi opened Gatchaman for licensing and announced a planned 3-D theatrical release in 2011. On December 11, 2009, Imagi's Hong Kong-based parent company, Imagi International Holdings Limited, laid off 100 employees. In January 2010 it announced that although the Gatchaman project would be delivered in 100-percent stereoscopic 3D, to safeguard working capital it would close its U.S. subsidiaries. The U.S. closure was finalized in late January, with about 30 staffers laid off and a few key personnel continuing as consultants as Imagi sought $30 million from investors for its animation projects. In February 2010 the parent company laid off another 300 employees, calling the layoffs temporary as it sought new investors. On June 21, 2011, Imagi announced in its annual report that the Gatchaman film project was cancelled.

=== Nikkatsu film ===
Nikkatsu Studios produced a live-action version of Gatchaman for Japan, which was released on August 24, 2013, starring Tori Matsuzaka, Go Ayano, Ayame Goriki, Tatsyomi Hamada, and Ryohei Suzuki.

=== American live-action film ===
It was announced at San Diego Comic-Con in July 2019 that Joe and Anthony Russo are producing a live-action Battle of the Planets film through their production company, AGBO Studios with the possibility of directing.

== Character variations ==
=== Team variations in different versions ===
Gatchaman	Battle of the Planets	G-Force	Eagle Riders	OVA (Harmony Gold dub)	Rank	Bird Uniform	Weapon	Mecha	Voice actor (Gatchaman)	Voice actor (Gatchaman OVA)	Voice actor (BOTP)	Voice actor (G-Force)	Voice actor (Harmony Gold OVA dub)	Voice actor (Eagle Riders)	Voice actor (ADV TV/Sentai OVA dub)
Ken Washio	Mark	Ace Goodheart	Hunter Harris	Ken the Eagle	G1	Eagle	Razor boomerang	Airplane	Katsuji Mori	Masaya Onosaka	Casey Kasem	Sam Fontana	Eddie Frierson	Richard Cansino	Leraldo Anzaldua
George "Joe" Asakura	Jason	Dirk Daring	Joe Thax	Joe the Condor	G2	Condor	Pistol	Race Car	Isao Sasaki	Kōji Ishii	Ronnie Schell	Cam Clarke	Richard Cansino	Bryan Cranston	Brian Jepson
Jun	Princess	Agatha "Aggie" June	Kelly Jennar	June the Swan	G3	Swan	Yo-yo	Motorcycle	Kazuko Sugiyama	Michiko Neya	Janet Waldo	Barbara Goodson	Lara Cody	Heidi Noelle Lenhart	Kim Prause
Jinpei	Keyop	Pee Wee	Mickey Dugan	Jimmy the Falcon	G4	Swallow	Bolo	Dune Buggy	Yoku Shioya	Rica Matsumoto	Alan Young	Barbara Goodson	Mona Marshall	Mona Marshall	Luci Christian
Ryu Nakanishi	Tiny Harper	Hoot "Hooty" Owl	Ollie Keeawani	Rocky the Owl	G5	Owl	Pistol	God Phoenix	Shingo Kanemoto	Fumihiko Tachiki	Alan Dinehart	Jan Rabson/ Gregg Berger	Richard Epcar	Paul Schrier	Victor Carsrud

=== Other character variations in different versions ===
Gatchaman	Battle of the Planets	G-Force	Eagle Riders	OVA (Harmony Gold Dub)	Voice actor (Gatchaman)	Voice actor (BOTP)	Voice actor (G-Force)	Voice actor (Gatchaman OVA)	Voice actor (Eagle Riders)	Voice actor (Harmony Gold OVA dub)	Voice actor (ADV TV/Sentai OVA dub)
Dr. Kozaburo Nambu-hakase	Chief Anderson	Dr. Benjamin Brighthead	Dr. Thaddeus Keane	Dr. Kozaburo Nambu	Tōru Ōhira	Alan Dinehart	Jan Rabson/Gregg Berger	Ikuya Sawaki	Michael McConnohie	Greg O'Neill	Andy McAvin
ISO Director Anderson	President Kane	Anderson / Cmdr. Todd (some episodes)	Anderson	Director Anderson	Teiji Ōmiya	Edward Andrews	Jan Rabson/Gregg Berger	Yonehiko Kitagawa	Michael Forest		Marty Fleck
Red Impulse / Kentaro Washio	Col. Cronos	Red Impulse / Kendrick Goodheart	Red Impulse / Harley Harris	Red Spectre / Kentaro Washio		Keye Luke	Cam Clarke	Unshō Ishizuka	Bob Papenbrook		John Tyson
Berg Katse	Zoltar	Galactor	Lukan	Solaris	Mikio Terashima	Keye Luke	Bill Capizzi	Kaneto Shiozawa	R. Martin Klein		Edwin Neal
Sosai (Leader) X	O Luminous One / The Great Spirit	Computor	Cybercom	Lord Zortek	Nobuo Tanaka	Keye Luke	Jan Rabson/Gregg Berger	Nobuo Tanaka	Ralph Votrais	Peter Spellos	Winston Parish
Gel Sadra			Mallanox		Masaru Ikeda						R. Martin Klein
Sylvie Pandora-hakase			Dr. Francine Aikens		Dr. Sylvie Pandora	Miyuka Ieda					Lara Cody
Announcer					Hideo Kinoshita/Shūsei Nakamura	William Woodson (Main) / Alan Young (Zark)	Norm Prescott				George Manley

=== Other changes ===
Variations	Gatchaman (Japanese)	Battle of the Planets	Guardians of Space	Eagle Riders	OVA (English, Harmony Gold)	Gatchaman (English)
Identity change command	Bird, go!‡	Transmute!	G-Force, transform!	Eagle Mode, now!	Ken / Eagle One, transform!; Joe / Shapeshift, Condor!; June / Swan Mode, now!; Jimmy / Falcon Tracker, transform!	Bird, go!
Enemy planet	Selectol	Spectra	Galactor	Vorak	Galactor	Selectol
Enemy civilization	Galactor (Gyarakutā)	Spectra	Galactor	Vorak	Galactor	Galactor

‡The original Japanese-language version of Gatchaman features a few words in English.

== Video games ==
Ken, Jun and Berg appear as playable characters in Tatsunoko Fight. Ken and Jun appear as playable fighters in Tatsunoko vs. Capcom: Cross Generation of Heroes, and Joe joins Ken and Jun in Tatsunoko vs. Capcom: Ultimate All-Stars.

== Comics ==
In July 2023, it was announced that Mad Cave Studios partnered with Tatsunoko Productions to publish a new comic book

== Reception ==
In 2001, the Japanese magazine Animage listed the 1972 Gatchaman TV series the 10th-best anime production of all time.

== Legacy ==
=== Impact ===
Gatchaman helped establish the convention of the five-member hero team emulated in later series, notably in the successful tokusatsu Super Sentai franchise (a genre exemplified by the English series adaptation of the Power Rangers franchise many years later). The Sentai series Chōjin Sentai Jetman was, in many ways, a homage to Gatchaman.

=== Guest appearances and pop culture references ===
- The Italian cartoon Winx Club parodied Gatchaman in the episode "Battle on Planet Eraklyon" when several characters form the superhero quintet "Patchamen," with uniforms and mannerisms bearing striking resemblances to those of the Science Ninja Team.
- In 1994, the Science Ninja Team and Dr. Nambu appeared in a crossover OVA, Time Bokan: Royal Revival.
- In 2000, NTT East produced two animated and two live-action television commercials for their ISDN service with an updated version of Gatchaman, featuring members of the J-Pop boy group SMAP.
- They appeared in several episodes of the 2008 reboot of Yatterman as background characters and played a minor speaking role in the hour-long "Episode 12.5" TV special.
- The third episode of Sket Dance has Jun as a playable character in a re-enactment of Tatsunoko vs. Capcom.
- The face of one of the characters appears in episode 252 of the Gintama anime.
- Archie's Sonic the Hedgehog comic series parodied Gatchaman in Sonic Super Special issue #12.
- A parody of Gatchaman was used in the cartoon Megas XLR as the S-Force, appearing in two episodes.
- Joe is the reference of the Yu-Gi-Oh! TCG card, "Swift Birdman Joe".
- The character Ushiwaka in the Clover Studios video game Ōkami wears a hood that resembles that of the Gatchaman cast members.
- The Ame-Comi version of Batgirl has a costume with design similarities to the Gatchaman costume. She is also equipped with Batarangs that look identical to Ken the Eagle's Birdrangs.
- The character of Lord Viper in the 90s cartoon King Arthur and the Knights of Justice appears to be based on the design of Spectra foot soldiers.
- In Batman Ninja vs. Yakuza League, The Batman Family begins to utilize "Science Ninja Techniques" against Yakuza League, a corrupt counterpart of Justice League.
