= La Trobe Financial =

Australian asset management company

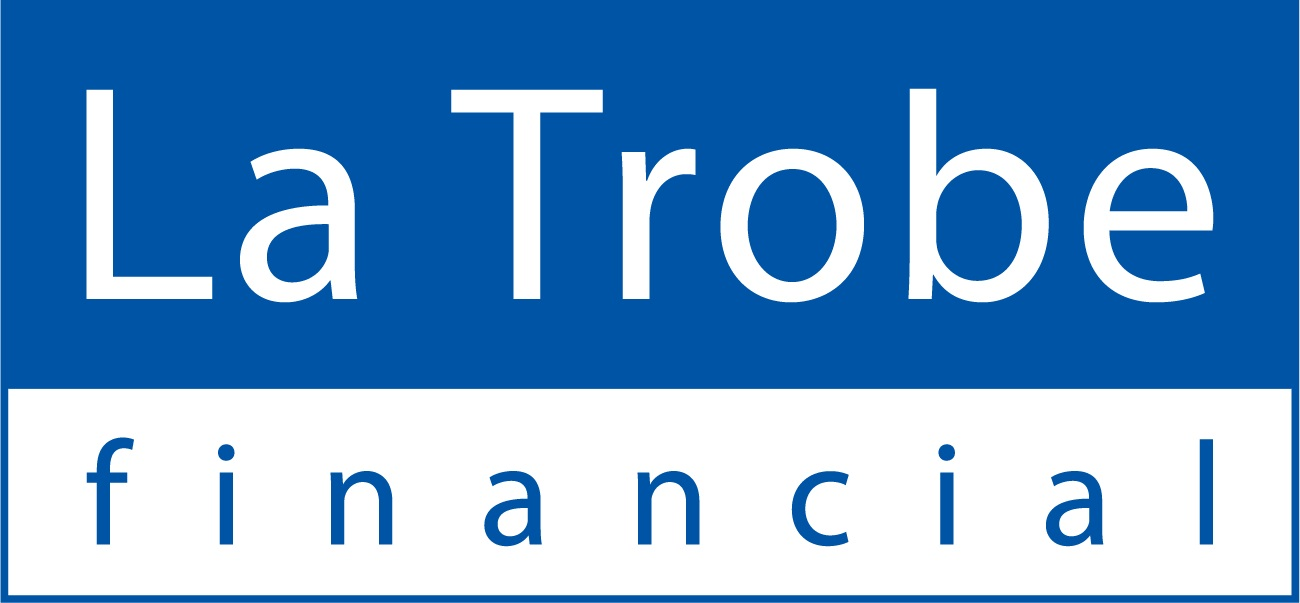
- Company type: Private Limited
- Industry: Financial services
- Founded: August 6, 1952; 73 years ago
- Headquarters: Melbourne, Australia
- Number of locations: Sydney, Melbourne
- Area served: Australia
- Key people: Chris Andrews (Chief Executive Officer)
- Products: Real Estate Credit, asset Management, retirement Income
- Services: Alternative Asset Management
- AUM: A$20 billion (2025)
- Owners: Brookfield Asset Management
- Number of employees: 550 (2024)
- Divisions: Real Estate Credit Finance (RECF); Asset Management (AM); People & Marketing; Finance; Tech-Ops; Risk & Governance
- Website: latrobefinancial.com

La Trobe Financial is an Australian alternative asset management firm specialising in Australian real estate credit retirement-focused income and asset management. The company is headquartered in Melbourne, with a secondary corporate office in Sydney.

In 2025, its average loan-to-value ratio (LVR) was 64.1%

== History ==
The Company was founded as a specialist lender in 1952 by Ray O’Neill with the steadfast belief that home ownership was the foundation of financial independence.

In 1999 it introduced Australia's first "Lite Doc" alternative verification loan for self-employed borrowers. In 2001 the firm was appointed by ASIC to assume operations of a failing national provider.

In 2014 it made its first entry into global debt capital markets via required minimum distributions (RMBS). That year Blackstone Inc. acquired an 80% equity stake in the firm. In 2022 Brookfield Asset Management acquired La Trobe Financial, and Chris Andrews was appointed chief executive officer (CEO).

In 2024 the firm launched a US private credit fund with Morgan Stanley as sub-adviser. In 2025 it listed a private credit fund on the ASX, trading under the code ASX:LF1.

In 2026 Brookfield Asset Management sold a minority stake to Axight, an Abu Dhabi–based private equity investment manager focusing on investing across the Asia-Pacific region. Axight was established by Lunate, a global investment firm with over US$115 billion in assets under management.

== Operations ==
The company operates through two core entities: La Trobe Financial Services an unlisted proprietary (private) company, holder of Australian Credit Licence "ACL" 392385, responsible for group credit asset administration and servicing, third party outsourcing services, custody services, group insurance sales, and wholesale institutional funding mandates. The second core operational entity is La Trobe Financial Asset Management a public (unlisted) company and holder of Australian Financial Services Licence "AFSL" 222213, responsible for all retail and other investments in the La Trobe Australian Credit Fund and Asset Management operation.

As of February 2025, loan portfolio distribution included:

- 15% Super Prime Residential
- 23% Prime Mortgages
- 49% Near-Prime Commercial & Residential
- 9% Specialist Residential

=== Asset Management ===
La Trobe Financial manages an investment platform, including:

- Australian Real Estate Private Credit Offerings (including the 12 Month Term Account, Classic Notice, 90 day Notice and 6 Month Notice Accounts, 2 Year, 4 Year and Select Investments.
- Peer-to-peer (P2P) investment offerings
- US corporate private credit
- ASX-listed Private Credit Fund (ASX:LF1)

By 2025, the La Trobe Australian Credit Fund held C. A$13.5 billion and was one of Australia's most diversified real estate private credit platforms.

=== Real Estate Private Credit ===
The firm provides tailored real estate private credit in: Residential Mortgages (prime, near prime, specialist), commercial Property Loans, construction Finance

== Partnerships ==
La Trobe Financial has collaborated with

- Blackstone Group (2017 - 2022): Acquired majority interest in strategic expansion
- Brookfield Asset Management (2022-present): Current global owner
- Australian big four banks, regional and international institutional mandates (ranging from A$500M to A$1.25B).

== Recognition ==
- Money Magazine - Australia's Best Private Credit Fund (16 years) & Non-Bank Lender of the Year (4 years)
- International Finance Magazine - Best Wealth Management Company Australia (10 years)
- Capital Finance International - Best Investment Management Team (5 years)
- The Australian - One of Australia's Best Places to Work (2024)
- MPA Top Mortgage Employer (4 years)
- Climate Active - Certified Carbon Neutral (2023 & 2024)
- Foresight Analytics (ratings)
- Zenith Investment Partners (ratings)
- Lonsec Research (ratings)
- SQM Research (ratings)

== Previous Chief Executives ==
- Kelvin David O’Mullane 1952–1972 (20 years) service 30 years
- Raymond Kevin O’Neill 1972–1997 (25 years) service 45 years
- Gregory Kevin O’Neill OAM 1997-2022 (25 years) service 37 years

== Previous Chairman ==
- Mr. Kelvin O'Mullane 1952–1961 (9 years)
- Mr. Donald Cooper OA 1961–1972 (11 years)
- Mr. Pat O'Brien 1972–1980 (8 years)
- Mr. John Barton 1980–1984 (4 years)
- Mr. John Dack DFC 1984–1986 (2 years)
- Mr. Bertram Wilson 1986–1997 (11 years)
- Mr. Raymond O'Neill 1997–2007 (10 years)
- Mr. Perce Cooper 2007–2010 (3 years)
- Mr. David Bird 2010–2015 (5 years)
- Mr. John Marriott 2015-2024 (9 years)
- Mr. Len Chersky 2024 - current
