= Sandy Frank =

American television producer (1929–2026)

- Born: Sundel Frank; July 11, 1929; Mount Kisco, New York, U.S.
- Died: October 20, 2026 (aged 97)
- Occupations: Television producer, distributor, marketer
- Known for: Founder of Sandy Frank Entertainment

Sundel Frank (July 11, 1929 – October 20, 2026) was an American television producer, distributor, and marketer of shows to U.S. networks. The series he handled included game shows, travel adventure shows, and Japanese monster movies.

== Early life and career ==
Frank was born in Mount Kisco, New York, on July 11, 1929, the son of Moses and Ida Frank. He started his career as a sales executive for Paramount Pictures, subsequently moving on to Guild Films, and NBC. Later, he was Senior Vice President of Worldwide Sales at the television division of the Wrather Corporation, which produced and distributed the Lassie and Lone Ranger television programs. In 1964, he opened Sandy Frank Program Sales Inc. as his first company. His first distribution successes were You Asked For It and Lassie, the latter licensed from Wrather.

== Sandy Frank Entertainment ==
Among the programs Frank's company produced or distributed were Name That Tune (1974–1981; 1984–1985), Face the Music (1980–1981), The New Treasure Hunt (1973–1977), The Parent Game (1972–1973), The Bobby Vinton Show (1975–1978), The Bill Cosby Show (1969–1971), The Dating Game (1973–1974), The $1.98 Beauty Show (1978–1980), and Lee Mendelson's Superstar Specials. Frank later produced and distributed Name That Tune and Battle of the Planets. Frank was also the leading distributor of travel adventure shows including America, High and Wild, Across the Seven Seas, The Traveler, and American West.

The company obtained rights and provided English dubbing for the entire line of Daiei Film monster movies. Due to the constraints of airing in the then-new UHF television "movie of the week" format, however, the English versions are substantially shortened from the Japanese originals. Many of these films have now lapsed to the public domain. These versions are best known for their frequent appearances on Mystery Science Theater 3000, where some of the company's dubs of Japanese films were lampooned, including a song titled "The Sandy Frank Song".

In 1972, the cover of Broadcasting read: "Sandy Frank Film Syndication, Inc. sets a new syndication sales record with The Parent Game: 125 markets sold in just 100 days of selling."

=== Battle of the Planets ===
In April 1977, Frank attended the MIP-TV conference in Cannes. It was here Frank first encountered the Japanese animation Science Ninja Team Gatchaman from producer Tatsunoko Production run by the Yoshida brothers. Frank committed to release the series in the United States after he saw the success of Star Wars in May 1977. Battle of the Planets is the title of the American adaptation of this series, created by Frank. He authorized new footage and hired writers to add dialog to fit the look of the animation without reference to original scripts. Of the 105 original Science Ninja Team Gatchaman episodes, 85 were used in the Battle of the Planets adaptation produced by Sandy Frank Entertainment in 1978.

=== Later career and life ===
In 2000, NATPE, the professional organization of television program executives, featured Frank in the video The Legends of Syndication, an overview of the history of syndicated media selling. Frank formed alliances in 2011 with a number of companies such as The Asylum in the United States and Sony in other countries. SFE has marketed Dangerous Minds (hosted by Rudy Giuliani) for Primetime Network, You Asked for It for Prime Time Network, and Face the Music which is being re-launched in a new prime time version.

In 2011, Frank filed suit against the denial of a tax credit to his production under Michigan's system of offering of up to 42% tax credits for the production of films in Michigan. The films supported are subject to restrictions such as that Michigan residents must be portrayed in a positive way, and game shows are not supported. Frank described his show as a reality show about the making of a game show and said that he made commitments of $350,000 after being told by state officials that his show would qualify for the credit, which was denied in 2009. The lawsuit claimed the restrictions were enforced arbitrarily, as other shows about competitions, including Crash Course and The Wedding Day, had received state support, as had potentially negative depictions in Hung, A Very Harold & Kumar 3D Christmas, and Up In The Air. According to The Hollywood Reporter, Sandy Frank Productions claimed "violations of Michigan's film tax credit law, Michigan's administrative procedures act, unjust enrichment, breach of contract, fraud, misrepresentation, and violation of equal protection and due process under the 14th Amendment to the U.S. Constitution." A federal district court judge dismissed the complaint on January 4, 2012.

Frank died on October 20, 2026, at the age of 97.
