= Gatchaman (film) =

- Theatrical release poster
- Directed by: Toya Sato
- Written by: Yusuke Watanabe
- Based on: Science Ninja Team Gatchaman by Tatsunoko Production
- Starring: Tori Matsuzaka; Gō Ayano; Ayame Goriki; Tatsuomi Hamada; Ryohei Suzuki
- Music by: Nima Fakhrara
- Production company: Django Film
- Distributed by: Toho
- Release date: August 24, 2013
- Running time: 113 minutes
- Country: Japan
- Languages: Japanese; English

Gatchaman (ガッチャマン) is a 2013 Japanese tokusatsu superhero film directed by Toya Sato based on the classic 1970s anime television series Science Ninja Team Gatchaman.

== Plot ==
By the year 2050 AD, a mysterious organization called Galactor has occupied half of the Earth and threatens to exterminate the human race. Around the same time, the International Science Organization uncovers mysterious stones that bear unusual powers. It is said that approximately one in eight million people is able to harness the power of the stones; they are known as a "Receptor". Dr. Kozaburo Nambu gathers a team of these five lucky Receptors together. Known as the Gatchaman team, they are tasked with defeating Galactor.

== Cast ==
- Tori Matsuzaka as Ken Washio
- Gō Ayano as Joe Asakura
- Ayame Goriki as Jun Ohtsuki
- Tatsuomi Hamada as Jinpei Ohtsuki
- Ryohei Suzuki as Ryu Nakanishi
- Gorō Kishitani as Dr. Nambu
- Ken Mitsuishi as Dr. Kirkland
- Eriko Hatsune as Naomi/Berg Katze
- Shidō Nakamura as Iriya
- Hiromi Shinjo as Gillman
- Yumiko as Mei
- Koji Kawamoto as Mike Miller
- Gregory Pekar as Director General Anderson
- Nahana as ISO Agent
- Alexander Clemmens as Embassy Employee
- Manoj Mantri as Edgar Clifford
- Dilara Islam Tina as Alma Clifford
- Leigh Carmichael as Attendee 1
- Thad Gilbert as Attendee 2
- Burney as Stall Manager
- Nagato Okui as young Ken
- Kishio Ohmoto as young Joe
- Kokoa Ishii as young Jun
- Haruka Iwata as young Jinpei
- Kakeru Yoshida as young Ryu
- Raimu Komi as young Naomi
- Kenichi Masusa as ISO Agent 1
- Jiro Matsuda as ISO Agent 2
- Arihiro Iwata as ISO Agent 3
- Hiroko Yashiki as Mrs. Nanbu (in photo)
- Nako Yabuki as Dr. Nanbu's daughter (in photo)
- Noriko Baba as female announcer (from Nippon Television)
- Yoshiaki Satō as male announcer (from Nippon Television)
- Junpei Takiguchi as Dokurobei (archive footage)

== Production and release ==
The theme song for the movie is "Niji wo Matsu Hito", performed by popular Japanese rock band Bump of Chicken.

== Reception ==
The movie is praised for its hero costumes and fight scenes. The film got a 5.1 ranking in IMDB. In Japan, it opened in fifth place with ¥119,201,780 (approx. US$1,171,977) and had earned ¥401,196,315 (approx. US$3,944,512) by its third weekend.

Japanese magazine Eiga Geijutsu (映画芸術) ranked the film as one of the 10 worst Japanese films of 2013.
