= Philece Sampler =

American actress (1953–2021)

- Born: Debra Philece Sampler; July 16, 1953; San Angelo, Texas, U.S.
- Died: July 1, 2021 (aged 67); Los Angeles, California, U.S.
- Occupation: Actress
- Years active: 1978–2021

Debra Philece Sampler (July 16, 1953 – July 1, 2021) was an American actress. She began her career on the soap operas Days of Our Lives as Renée DuMonde and Another World as Donna Love Hudson.

In addition to her acting career, Sampler provided the voice to various characters in animated series, such as Toph Beifong in The Legend of Korra. She also voiced characters in English-language dubs, such as Mimi Tachikawa and Cody Hida from Digimon: Digital Monsters, Tiptory in Eureka Seven, and Hiyori Tamura from Lucky Star.

== Life and career ==
Sampler was born in San Angelo, Texas, on July 16, 1953. She graduated from J.J. Pearce High School in Richardson, Texas in 1971. After graduating from the University of North Texas in 1975 with a drama degree, Sampler moved to Hollywood and quickly landed guest roles in a few television movies and series, including The Incredible Hulk in season 4, episode 59 titled "Dark Side".

Sampler first made a name for herself playing Renée DuMonde on the soap Days of Our Lives. The Renee character became the focus of a major 1983 murder mystery, resulting in one of the most spectacular send-offs in daytime history. After leaving Days of our Lives in September 1983, she went on to the TV series Rituals, which ran from 1984–1985. The show also starred future soap stars Mary Beth Evans (Kayla, Days) and Jon Lindstrom (Kevin, GH), as well as veteran soap star Kin Shriner (ex-Scotty, GH; ex-Brian, B&B) and Tina Louise (Ginger from Gilligan's Island). After Rituals, Philece went on to Another World in 1986 to play Donna Love, a role she took over from originating actress Anna Stuart. She left AW in 1989 when Stuart reclaimed the role. She had a couple of guest-starring roles on TJ Hooker as Sue Ann and on Hunter as Casey. She then took a sabbatical to Japan with her then-fiance. She returned to the US with a few screenplays and formed Philman Entertainment, a production company.

Sampler worked as associate producer of the Los Angeles stage hit Sordid Lives by Del Shores. She performed in UPN's animated series The Incredible Hulk, as the voice of Betty Ross, replacing Genie Francis, who voiced Ross on the first six episodes. She remained pals with her former Days of Our Lives love interest Gregg Marx (David Banning). She performed a voiceover on Aaahh!!! Real Monsters – "Ollie Ollie Oxen Free". She did a voice on Nickelodeon's Rugrats, where she played Emma (Chuckie's love interest) in the episode "He Saw, She Saw".

=== Death ===
Sampler died from a heart attack in Los Angeles on July 1, 2021, at the age of 67, 15 days shy of her 68th birthday.

== Filmography ==
=== Live-action roles ===
| Year | Title | Role | Notes | Source |
|---|---|---|---|---|
| 1980 | The Incredible Hulk | Laurie Schulte | | |
| 1980–1984 | Days of Our Lives | Renée DuMonde | | |
| 1984–1985 | Rituals | Lacey Jarrett Gallagher | | |
| 1987–1989 | Another World | Donna Love Hudson | | |
| 2007 | The Interior | Gloria | | |

=== Anime ===
List of dubbing performances in anime
| Year | Series | Role | Notes | Source |
|---|---|---|---|---|
| 1996 | Here is Greenwood | Sumire Hasukawa, Dorm Lady (Media Blasters dub) | | |
| 1999–2000 | Digimon Adventure | Mimi Tachikawa, Koromon (Ep. 16) | | |
| 2000–01 | Digimon Adventure 02 | Cody Hida, Mimi Tachikawa, Anna | | |
| 2000 | Dinozaurs | Rena, Dino Ptera (final episode), Drago Dactyl | | |
| 2001–02 | Digimon Tamers | Alice McCoy, Mrs. Matsuki (Takato's mom) | | |
| 2001 | Arc the Lad | Robby | | |
| 2001 | Rurouni Kenshin | Makimachi Misao, Sakura | | |
| 2002 | Digimon Frontier | Floramon, Shinya Kanbara | | |
| 2002–03 | X | Yuzuriha Nekoi, Tokiko Magami | | |
| 2002 | éX-Driver | Lorna Endou | | |
| 2002 | Shinzo | Binka | | |
| 2002–03 | Great Teacher Onizuka | Chikako Shiari (Ep. 9-43), Hidemi Ohta, Tomoko Nomura | | |
| 2003 | Brigadoon | Lili, Tamemi Ebichya, Wakana Konno | | |
| 2003–04 | Figure 17 | Mina Sawada, Kyoko Iburagi | | |
| 2003 | .hack//Liminality | Kiyoka | | |
| 2003 | Daigunder | Dr. Bridget | | |
| 2003 | Ai Yori Aoshi | Taeko Minazuki | | |
| 2003 | Argento Soma | Ai | | |
| 2005 | Battle B-Daman | Mie Delgado | | |
| 2005–06 | Zatch Bell! | Lori | | |
| 2005–06 | Fafner in the Azure | Kiyomi Kaname, Ikumi Nishio | | |
| 2005 | Bottle Fairy | Sarara | | |
| 2005 | Haré+Guu | Haré | | |
| 2005–07 | Bobobo-bo Bo-bobo | Beauty | | |
| 2006 | Idaten Jump | Kakeru Sakamaki, Sho's Mom | | |
| 2006–07 | Eureka Seven | Tiptory (Ep. 8–9) | | |
| 2008 | Code Geass: Lelouch of the Rebellion | HiTV reporter (Ep. 21), Additional Voices | | |
| 2008 | Digimon Data Squad | Nanami, Thomas' Mother (Ep. 15) | | |
| 2012 | Blue Exorcist | Shiemi's Grandmother (Ep. 4), Ryuji Suguro (Young, Ep. 5) | | |
| 2015 | BlazBlue Alter Memory | Taokaka | | |
| 2017 | Berserk (2016) | Flora, Nico | | |
| 2017 | Blue Exorcist: Kyoto Saga | Ryuji Suguro (Young, Ep. 2) | | |
| 2017 | Dragon Ball Super | Goten, Kid Goku (flashback) (Bang Zoom! Entertainment dub) | | |
| 2017 | Hyōka | Female Teacher (ep. 1, Funimation dub) | | |
| 2018 | Sword Gai: The Animation | Kei | | |
| 2019 | Demon Slayer: Kimetsu no Yaiba | Rokuta (ep. 1) | | |
| 2019 | Sword Art Online: Alicization | Sister Azariya | | |
| 2019–21 | The Promised Neverland | Lannion, Grandma, Sherry | Also Season 2 | |
| 2020 | Ghost in the Shell: SAC 2045 | Brenda Rucker | | |
| 2021 | Yashahime: Princess Half-Demon | Hikomaru & Chiyo's Grandmother (Ep. 11) | | |

- Bleach - Ayame, Chizuru Honsho, Waineton (Cain's Doll)
- Idol Project - Layla B. Simmons
- Kill la Kill - Mataro Mankanshoku (credited as Lindsey Eaton)
- Kyo Kara Maoh! - Nicola
- Last Exile - Alister Agrew, Claus Valca (Young)
- Love Hina - Tsuruko Aoyama
- Lucky Star - Hiyori Tamura
- Marmalade Boy - Asst. Principal Kyoto
- Mars Daybreak - Anya
- Mobile Suit Gundam F91 - Manuela Panopa
- Mobile Suit Gundam: Iron-Blooded Orphans - Sakura Pretzel
- Mouse - Mei's Grandmother, Samasa Morijima
- Overman King Gainer - Elizabeth
- Please Twins! - Futaba Mashita
- Rozen Maiden - Mitsu 'Micchan' Kusakabe
- Samurai Champloo - Budokiba
- Samurai Girl Real Bout High School - Madoka Mitsurugi
- SD Gundam Force - Mayor Margaret Gathermoon, Noah
- The Incredible Hulk - Betty Ross (1997)
- The Seven Deadly Sins - Mead
- The Twelve Kingdoms - Gobo
- Tokko - Sakura Rokujo
- Transformers: Robots in Disguise - Kelly
- Tweeny Witches: The Adventures - Iga (Ep. 5)
- Ultra Maniac - Maya Orihara
- Vandread - Barnette Orangello
- Viewtiful Joe - Silvia
- Wild Arms: Twilight Venom - Jerusha

=== Animation ===
List of voice performances in animation
| Year | Series | Role | Notes | Source |
|---|---|---|---|---|
| 1994-96 | Aaahh!!! Real Monsters | Nurse, Baby (3), Sally, Russian Woman, Lois | | |
| 1996-97 | The Incredible Hulk | Betty Ross | | |
| 1997 | The Angry Beavers | Girl, Mother (ep. 4) | | |
| 1998 | Rugrats | Emma (ep. 89) | | |
| 2001 | Invader Zim | Scientist #4, Germ Woman, Tiny Germ Voice (ep. 4) | | |
| 2001-03 | Stanley | Lester Goldberg | Seasons 1-2 | |
| 2004 | All Grown Up! | Francine (ep. 17) | | |
| 2014 | The Legend of Korra | Toph Beifong (Elder), Vendor (ep. 41), Woman (ep. 41) | | |
| 2015–16 | Goldie & Bear | Granny (of Red Riding Hood), Mother Goose | | |
| 2015–21 | Miraculous: Tales of Ladybug & Cat Noir | Sabine Cheng, Ms. Mendeleiev, Prince Ali's chaperone | Seasons 1-4 | |
| 2018 | Treehouse Detectives | Rumy, Hermit Crab, Sea Turtle | | |
| 2019 | The Loud House | Mildred Scalise (ep. 143) | | |

=== Film ===
List of voice and English dubbing performances in feature films
| Year | Title | Role | Notes | Source |
|---|---|---|---|---|
| 2000 | Digimon: The Movie | Mimi Tachikawa, Matt and T.K.'s Grandmother, Cody Hida | | |
| 2003 | Cardcaptor Sakura Movie 2: The Sealed Card | Kaho Mizuki, Spinel Sun (small form) (Leave it to Kero-chan! short) | | |
| 2014 | A Letter to Momo | Grandmother | | |
| 2016–18 | Digimon Adventure tri. | Mimi Tachikawa | | |
| 2020 | Ni no Kuni | Pub Mistress | | |
| 2021 | Demon Slayer: Kimetsu no Yaiba the Movie: Mugen Train | Rokuta Kamado | wide theatrical release, Aniplex | |

List of voice performances in direct-to-video and television films
| Year | Series | Role | Notes | Source |
|---|---|---|---|---|
| 2003 | Sakura Wars: The Movie | Tsubaki Takamura | | |
| 2005 | Digimon: Revenge of Diaboromon | Mimi Tachikawa, Cody Hida | | |
| 2005 | Digimon: Runaway Locomon | Riley Ohtori, Jeri Katou | | |
| 2020 | Miraculous World: New York: United HeroeZ | Ms. Mendeleiev | | |
| 2021 | Miraculous World: Shanghai, The Legend of Ladydragon | Sabine Cheng | | |

=== Video games ===
- AI: The Somnium Files - Mayumi Matsushita
- Arcanum: Of Steamworks and Magick Obscura - Z'an Al'urin
- BlazBlue series - Taokaka
- Blue Dragon - Child, Female Village, Devour Village Old Woman
- Deadly Premonition 2: A Blessing in Disguise - Mrs. Carpenter
- Demon Slayer: Kimetsu no Yaiba – The Hinokami Chronicles - Rokuta Kamado
- Legends of Runeterra - Fizz, Kennen
- Rune Factory 5 - Yuki
- Shenmue III - Additional Cast

=== Documentary ===
- Adventures in Voice Acting - Herself
