= Steve Kramer (actor) =

American actor (born 1950)

- Born: December 24, 1950 (age 75); San Juan Capistrano, California, U.S.
- Other names: Steve Kraemer; Steven Kramer; Drew Levi Thomas; Drew Lexi Thomas; Drew Thomas
- Occupation: Actor
- Years active: 1972–present
- Spouse: Melora Harte

Steve Kramer (born December 24, 1950) is an American actor who has provided voices for English language versions of Japanese anime films, television series and video games. He has also done voice acting for various Power Rangers series in the past, with the best-known of those roles being the voice of Darkonda in Power Rangers in Space. His wife, Melora Harte, is a voice actress. Kramer has also been credited as Steve Kraemer, Steven Kramer, Drew Levi Thomas, Drew Lexi Thomas, and Drew Thomas. Kramer is usually cast in the role of wise old men. He is also a voice director and script writer, adapting many anime and video games.

== Notable roles ==
=== Anime ===
- 3×3 Eyes – Frog Demon, Mama
- The Adventures of Manxmouse – Mr. Pettin/Ethan/Truck Driver/Radio Announcer
- Accel World – Match Maker
- Aesop's Fables – The Grasshopper
- Ah! My Goddess: The Movie – Various
- Akira – Roy (Streamline dub), additional voices (Animaze dub)
- Apocalypse Zero – Zenigata
- Appleseed – Commander Lance
- Arc the Lad – Chimera, Operative, Soldier
- Argento Soma – FUNERAL Board
- Around the World with Willy Fog – Constable Bully
- Ayakashi Ayashi: Ayashi Divine Comedy – Yozo Torii
- Babel II – Babel
- Babel II: Beyond Infinity – Murai, Old Monk, UN Soldier
- Bakuto Sengen Daigunder – Despector
- Berserk: The Golden Age Arc – Lord Gennon
- The Big O – Bonnie Frazier
- Bleach – Shunsui Kyōraku, Barragan Luisenbarn
- Bleach: Fade to Black – Shunsui Kyoraku
- Bleach: Thousand-Year Blood War – Shunsui Kyoraku
- Bleach: Hell Verse – Murakumo
- Bobobo-bo Bo-bobo – Gechappi, Gasser's Neckbelt, Lead Battleship Special Forces Member, Lapalapa, General Lee Fishcake
- Blue Dragon – Talta Village Elder
- Button Nose – Benny, Bernie
- Carried by the Wind: Tsukikage Ran – Benitsubaki Clansman, Official, Restaurant Owner, Scam Victim
- Code Geass: Lelouch of the Rebellion – Priest (Ep. 13)
- Coppelion – Kunikida
- Cowboy Bebop – Carlos, Huey, Otto, Whitney Matsumoto
- Cowboy Bebop: The Movie – Carlos
- Crimson Wolf – Shinoda, Genghis Khan, Assassin
- Cyborg 009 – Cyborg 006 (Chang Changku)
- Daigunder – Despector
- Detatoko Princess – Fitness Brother, Mayor
- Digimon Adventure – Vilemon
- Digimon Adventure 02 – Starmon
- Digimon Data Squad – Rocky, Vilemon
- Digimon Tamers – Baihumon
- Digimon Frontier – Cerberumon, Starmon 1, Meteormon 1
- Digimon Fusion – Shurimon (Ep. 23–24), Wisemon (Season 2)
- Dirty Pair: Project Eden – Wattsman (Streamline dub)
- Dogtanian and the Three Muskehounds – Pip Squeak
- Doomed Megalopolis – Kuroda
- Early Reins – Col. Spencer
- Eureka 7 – Axel Thurston
- éX-Driver – Businessman, Dad, Driver
- Fake – Berkeley Rose, Ted
- Fighting Spirit – Mr. Yasuda
- Figure 17 – Isamu Kuroda
- FLCL – Nanadaba Shigekuni, Train Announcer, Martians Baseball Player
- Fushigi Yūgi – Mayo's Father (Eikoden), Seiryu Seiken
- Freedom – Chimpster
- Gad Guard – Attorney, Bartender, Gang Member 1, Man in Casino 1, Morro, Officer 1, Shopkeeper, Stallkeeper
- Gate Keepers – Rescue Worker
- Geneshaft – Chata, Ewers
- Ghost in the Shell: Stand Alone Complex – Churnow,
- Ghost in the Shell: Stand Alone Complex 2nd Gig – Chairman Tsutomo Tadokoro
- Ghost Slayers Ayashi – Yozo Torii, Ryudo's Employee, Vassal
- Great Pretender - Shougo Nakanoshima
- Grimm's Fairy Tale Classics – Wolf (Little Red Riding Hood)
- Gungrave – Randy
- .hack//Legend of the Twilight – Hot Spring Granny
- Heat Guy J – Mauro (2nd Voice "after the death of Anthony Mozdy")
- Idol Project – Ivie
- Immortal Grand Prix (microseries) – Dimmer
- JoJo's Bizarre Adventure – Dario Brando
- JoJo's Bizarre Adventure: Diamond is Unbreakable – Yoshihiro Kira
- Jungle de Ikou! – Ahem
- Kaze no Yojimbo – Detective Saeki
- Kiki's Delivery Service – Cop, Street Sweeper, additional voices (Streamline dub)
- Kurokami: The Animation – Bernhardt
- Kyo Kara Maoh! – Alford's Father, Bob, Heathcrife, Pirate, Shas, T-Zou
- Last Exile – Claimh-Solais Crewman, Fuel Attendant #1, Vanship Union Operator #1
- Leave it to Piyoko! – BGG Gang Member B, Horse, Robot
- Lensman – Worsel
- Lily C.A.T. – Dular
- A Little Snow Fairy Sugar – Henry, Lancelot the Turtle, Luchino
- Lu over the Wall - Grandfather
- Lupin III: The Castle of Cagliostro – Goemon Ishikawa XIII (Streamline release)
- Lupin III Part 1 - Lupin the Second
- Magi: The Kingdom of Magic – Matal Mogamett
- Mahoromatic: Something More Beautiful – Chocolate Chef, Delivery Man, Green Grocer, Management Leader/Oda Nobunaga, Street Thug 2
- Maple Town – Wilde Wolf
- MÄR: Märchen Awakens Romance – Gaira
- March Comes In like a Lion - Shoichi Matsunaga
- Mars Daybreak – EF Helmsman
- Medalist - Mamoru Sekoma
- The Melancholy of Haruhi Suzumiya – Shamisen
- Mirage of Blaze – Nue, Teacher, Shingen Takeda
- Mobile Suit Gundam F91 – Bobulz, Gillet Krueger
- Mobile Suit Gundam: The 08th MS Team – Terry Sanders Jr.
- Mobile Suit Gundam: The Movie Trilogy – Tem Ray, Twaning
- Monster – Dr. Heinemann
- Moribito: Guardian of the Spirit – Master Star Reader, Taga
- Mushrambo – Katris
- My Neighbor Totoro – Old Farmer, Kanta's Father (Streamline dub)
- My Oni Girl – Naoya Yamashita
- The Secret of Blue Water – Hanson (Streamline dub)
- Naruto – Third Hokage, Fish Seller
- Naruto Shippuden – Third Hokage
- Neo Tokyo – Driver
- New Getter Robo – Tsuna Watanabe
- New Gigantor – Inspector Ohtsuka
- Nightwalker – Director
- Ninja Cadets – Yukinobu
- Nodame Cantabile – Hidemi Saku, Sebastiano Viera, Takehiko Miyoshi, Tatsumi Mine
- Noein – Takuya Mayuzumi, Isuka, The Time Drifter
- Noozles – Osgood
- Nura: Rise of the Yokai Clan – Hebidayu, Professor Adashibara
- Otogi Zoshi – Regent, Tetsu
- Outlaw Star – Hadul
- Overman King Gainer – Pelhar
- Patlabor WXIII – Boat Captain, Detective, Engineer, Labor Technician, Police Officer, Security Guard, Yoshitake Misaki
- Phoenix – Kadan, Officer, Tsume Otoko (Sun Chapter)
- Pokémon: Hisuian Snow – Alec's father
- Robotech – Angelo Dante
- Rurouni Kenshin – Dr. Gensai, Police Officer (Ep. 33), Jirokichi Ebisu, Shakku Arai (Ep. 40), Shibumi
- Sailor Moon – Wiseman (Viz Media dub)
- Sailor Moon Crystal – Wiseman
- Saint Tail – Little
- Saiyuki Gunlock – Demon, Jiroshin, Priest, Servant
- Saiyuki Reload – Demon, Jiroshin, Servant, Tech
- Sakura Wars: The Movie – Musei Edogawa
- Samurai Champloo – Kariya Kagetoki
- Scrapped Princess – Old Man
- S-CRY-ed – Ayu Dairen
- Shinzo – Katris, Hyper Chiro, Panda
- Sol Bianca: The Legacy – Manager
- Space Pirate Captain Harlock – Crewmember, Bar Patron, Prime Minister, additional voices
- Sword Gai: The Animation - Shogun
- Tenchi Muyo! GXP – King Balta
- Tenjho Tenge – Dougen Takayanagi
- Transformers: Robots in Disguise – Cerebros, R.E.V.
- Urda – Baltram
- Vampire Hunter D – Dr. Fehring
- When They Cry – Teppei Hojo, Tatsuyoshi Kasai
- Wicked City – Jin
- Wild Arms: Twilight Venom – Dr. Sabriskie
- Witch Hunter Robin – Syndicate Gunman #3, Thug
- Wolf's Rain – Moss
- X – Scientist
- Ys II: Castle in the Heavens – Feiya Rall

=== Non-anime roles ===
- The Animated Alias: Tribunal – Rudolph Gaborno
- Bling – Zang
- Computer Warriors – Minus
- Fly Me to the Moon – Leonid
- Little Big Panda - Additional voices
- The Happy Cricket – General
- Iznogoud – Iznogoud and various
- Jin Jin and the Panda Patrol – Dr. Maniac
- Katy and the Katerpillar Kids - Graco Hawk
- Little Mouse on the Prairie – Grandpa, B.C.
- The Little Polar Bear – Seagull #1
- The Return of Dogtanian – Pip
- Stitch & Ai – Additional voices
- Walter Melon – Additional voices
- Wisdom of the Gnomes – Holler

=== Live action roles ===
- Adventures in Voice Acting – Himself
- Babe: Pig in the City – Additional voices
- Big Bad Beetleborgs – Mucant (voice)
- CSI: NY – Administrative Judge
- Dallas
- Dante's Cove – Kevin's Stepfather
- Desperate Housewives – Detective Hewitt
- Drake & Josh – Stan the Car Man
- End of Days – Businessman
- ER – Pediatric Surgeon
- Everybody Hates Chris – Superintendent
- Falcon Crest – FBI Agent 1
- Gilmore Girls – Sam
- The Golden Girls – Dr. Stephen Deutsch
- Grosse Pointe – Director
- Hallo Spencer – Poldi, Karl-Gustav
- The Handler – Man
- Hooperman
- House M.D. – Ken
- Huff – Allen Meeks
- Hunter – Duty Officer
- Jake and the Fatman – Doctor
- Just Can't Get Enough – Detective Martin
- Looking for Comedy in the Muslim World – Sam Loman
- Love Boat: The Next Wave – 1st Mate
- Love Thy Neighbour – 3rd Guest
- Malcolm in the Middle – Doctor
- Masked Rider – Cyclopter (voice)
- Mighty Morphin Power Rangers – Gnarly Gnome, Slippery Shark, Saliguana, Robogoat, Hatchasaurus (2nd voice), Cyclopter (voices, uncredited)
- The Naked Truth – Duchovny's Lawyer
- The Oldest Rookie – Willard Haskell
- One on One – Janitor
- Onmyoji – Doson (voice)
- Pacific Blue – Agent Hardy
- Power Rangers Zeo – Wolfbane (voice, uncredited)
- Power Rangers Turbo – Dreadfeather (voice, uncredited)
- Power Rangers in Space – Darkonda, Darkliptor (voices)
- Power Rangers Time Force – Electropede (voice)
- Power Rangers Wild Force – Turbine Org (voice)
- Roseanne – Roger's Father
- Rusty: A Dog's Tale – Additional voices (voice)
- The Story Lady – Salesperson
- Ultraman: The Ultimate Hero – Dan
- VR Troopers – Drillbot, Terminoid, Transgressor (voices)
- The West Wing – Deputy Secretary
- The Young and the Restless
- Zeiram – Murata (voice)
- Zeiram 2 – Store Manager, Shop Keeper, Th (voices)
- 10-8: Officers on Duty – Gary Thorsen
- 24: Conspiracy – James Sutton

=== Foreign dubbing ===
List of English-language dubbings of foreign language shows
Year	Title	Country	Dubbed from	Role	Live Actor	Source
2016	Marseille	France	French	Pharamond	Eric Savin	

=== Video game roles ===
- Assassin's Creed – Additional voices
- Baten Kaitos Origins – Dark Brother
- Bleach: Shattered Blade – Shunsui Kyōraku
- Bleach: Soul Resurrección – Shunsui Kyōraku
- Blood and Magic – Voice
- Citizens of Earth – Opposition Leader
- Dirge of Cerberus: Final Fantasy VII – Incidental Characters
- Final Fantasy XIII – Cocoon Inhabitants
- Gundam Side Story 0079: Rise From the Ashes – Visch Donahue, additional voices
- Life Is Strange 2 – Additional Voices
- Lords of EverQuest – Additional voices
- Naruto: Clash of Ninja Revolution – Third Hokage
- Naruto: Rise of a Ninja – Third Hokage
- Naruto to Boruto: Shinobi Striker - Third Hokage
- Naruto Shippuden: Ultimate Ninja Impact – Third Hokage
- Naruto Shippuden: Ultimate Ninja Storm 2 – Third Hokage
- Naruto Shippuden: Ultimate Ninja Storm 3 – Third Hokage
- Naruto Shippuden: Ultimate Ninja Storm 4 – Third Hokage
- Naruto Shippuden: Ultimate Ninja Storm Generations – Third Hokage
- Naruto Shippuden: Ultimate Ninja Storm Revolution – Third Hokage
- Naruto: The Broken Bond – Third Hokage
- Paraworld – Hermit, Kleeman
- Phase Paradox - Lance Fuller
- Robotech: Battlecry – Skarrde
- The Elder Scrolls V: Skyrim – Additional voices
- Star Trek: Judgment Rites – Azrah, James Munro, Klingon Aide
- Ys X: Nordics – Clement Berge, Village Chief Nel

== Miscellaneous crew ==
=== Script adaptation ===
- The Adventures of Tom Sawyer
- Bakuto Sengen Daigunder
- Battle B-Daman
- Black Jack
- Bleach
- Bleach: The Hell Verse
- Blue Dragon'
- The Cockpit
- Daigunder
- Digimon Adventure
- Dinozaurs
- The Dog of Flanders
- Future Boy Conan (The Lost Intersound, Inc. pilot dub 1980s)
- Gatchaman
- Geneshaft
- Gestalt
- Grimm's Fairy Tale Classics
- Honeybee Hutch
- Iron Man: Rise of Technovore
- K
- The Littl' Bits
- Maple Town
- Maya the Bee
- Metal Fighter Miku
- Mighty Morphin Power Rangers
- Mon Colle Knights
- Monster
- Mushrambo
- Noozles
- Ox Tales
- The Return of Dogtanian
- Robotech
- Saban's Adventures of Peter Pan
- Saban's Adventures of Pinocchio
- Saban's Adventures of the Little Mermaid
- Sailor Moon S (Viz Media dub)
- Samurai Pizza Cats
- Sandokan
- SD Gundam Force
- Shinzo
- Tenchi in Tokyo
- Tiger & Bunny
- Transformers: Robots in Disguise
- Tokyo Pig
- Vampire Princess Miyu
- VR Troopers
- Wild 7
- Wowser
- YS-II
- Zeiram

=== Casting director ===
- Twilight of the Cockroaches

=== Voice director ===
- Bleach: Fade to Black
- Blue Dragon
- The Cockpit
- Captain Harlock and the Queen of a Thousand Years
- Codename: Robotech
- Dinozaurs
- DNA Sights 999.9
- Eagle Riders
- Gatchaman
- Honeybee Hutch
- Kyo Kara Maoh!
- Radiata Stories
- Requiem from the Darkness
- Robotech
- Robotech: Invasion
- Saint Tail – Director
- Shinzo
- Speed Racer X
- The Wicked and the Damned: A Hundred Tales of Karma
- Tokyo Pig
- Transformers: Robots in Disguise

=== ADR loop group ===
- Codename: Robotech
- Coronado
- Fly Me to the Moon
- A Turtle's Tale 2: Sammy's Escape from Paradise
- Nice Guys Sleep Alone
- The Prince of Egypt
- Resurrecting the Champ
- When Time Expires
