= Marc Handler =

American screenwriter and actor

- Born: North Hollywood, Los Angeles, California
- Occupations: Executive producer, scriptwriter, voice director
- Website: marchandler.com

Marc Handler is an American writer, producer, and voice director. He has contributed to various animated series, including Cowboy Bebop, Astro Boy, FLCL, Stitch & Ai, and Voltron. Handler is noted for his role as a story editor on the 2003 Astro Boy series, marking a significant collaboration between American and Japanese production teams.

== Early life ==
Born and raised in Los Angeles, California, Handler formed the Subject to Change Theatre Troupe and was active in various political causes. He holds two master's degrees from the University of Southern California in directing theatre and writing for film and television.

== Career ==
Handler's career includes writing for American animated series such as Teenage Mutant Ninja Turtles, Widget the World Watcher, and Denver, the Last Dinosaur. He has also adapted and voice-directed numerous anime series for English-speaking audiences. His work encompasses a range of projects from Cowboy Bebop to Power Rangers. Handler has also facilitated the introduction of original Chinese and South Korean animation to Western audiences.

In 2019, Handler spoke at the Conference on Dialogue of Asian Civilizations in Beijing. He has authored two books on writing and presentations, published in China and Korea.

Handler is affiliated with the Writers Guild of America and Screen Actors Guild, and has lectured at the University of Southern California and Glendale College.

== Personal life ==
Handler is married and has a son. The family resides in Shanghai, China and Phnom Penh, Cambodia.

== Awards ==
Year	Title	Award	Position	Result
2017	Stitch & Ai	CCG Award – Best Animation Series in China	Executive Producer, Writer, Voice Director & Consulting Producer	Won
2017	Stoney & Rocky	SMG Award – Best International Collaboration	Executive Producer, Writer, Voice Director & Consulting Producer	Won
2003	Astro Boy	Tokyo International Animation Fair: Best TV Animation	Executive Story Editor & writer	Won
2004	Astro Boy	Tokyo International Animation Fair: Best TV Series	Executive Story Editor & writer	Won
2012	Kioka	Shanghai TV Festival: Best Pre-School Animation Series	Voice Director	Won
2013	Kioka	Cynopsis Kids Awards, NYC	Voice Director	Nominated
2007	FLCL	American Anime Awards: Best Comedy	ADR Writer & Voice Director	Won
2007	FLCL	American Anime Awards: Best Short Series	ADR Writer & Voice Director	Won
1998	The New World of the Gnomes	Premios Midia Awards: Best Animated Series in Latin America/Spain	Writing Staff	Won
1990	De Donde	L.A. Dramalogue Award for Stage Directing	Director	Won

== Filmography ==
=== ADR / voice director ===
- The Adventures of Hutch the Honeybee
- Astro Boy – Pilot episode only
- Avalon
- Bit, The Cupid
- Born to Fight
- Cowboy Bebop: The Movie
- Dinozaurs
- Eagle Riders
- FLCL
- Kioka
- Little Magic Dragon
- Naruto
- Nomad
- Rave Master
- Shaolin Soccer
- Super Pig
- Ted & Dory Detectives
- Tenchi Forever
- Tokyo Raiders
- Voltron: The Third Dimension
- Zatoichi
- Zu Warriors

=== Script writer / adapter ===
- The Adventures of Hutch the Honeybee – ADR Writer
- Astro Boy – writer
- B-Legend! Battle Bedaman – ADR Writer
- Beat Down: Fists of Vengeance – writer
- Born to Fight – ADR Writer
- Castlevania: Curse of Darkness – writer
- Code Geass – ADR Writer
- Code Lyoko – Composite Writer
- Cowboy Bebop – ADR Writer
- Cowboy Bebop: The Movie – ADR Writer
- Denver, the Last Dinosaur – writer
- Dinozaurs – ADR Writer
- Dive Olly Dive – ADR Writer
- The Dragon Who Wasn't – ADR Writer
- Eagle Riders – ADR Writer
- FLCL – ADR Writer
- Fireball – ADR Writer
- Freedom – ADR Writer (Co-Written with Michael Sinterniklaas, Jay Snyder and Stephanie Sheh)
- Ghost in the Shell: Stand Alone Complex – ADR Writer
- .Hack//Liminality – ADR Writer
- Initial D – ADR Writer
- Kessen II – writer
- Little Magic Dragon – ADR Writer
- Metropolis – ADR Writer
- Mix Master – ADR Writer
- The Moo Family – writer
- Naruto – ADR Writer (Co-Written with Liam O'Brien, Sam Regal, Seth Walther, Ardwight Chamberlain, and Jeff Nimoy)
- The New World of the Gnomes – writer
- Nomad – ADR Writer
- Power Rangers Samurai – writer
- Power Rangers Megaforce – writer
- Power Rangers Dino Charge – (Co-Written with Chip Lynn)
- Pretty Sammy – ADR Writer
- Saber Rider – writer & ADR Writer
- Seven Samurai 20XX – writer
- Shaolin Soccer – ADR Script
- Shinzo – ADR Writer
- Steamboy – ADR Writer
- Super Pig – ADR Writer
- Teenage Mutant Ninja Turtles – writer
- Tenchi Forever – ADR Writer
- Tenchi in Tokyo – ADR Writer
- Tokyo Pig – ADR Writer
- Transformers: Robots in Disguise – ADR Writer
- Transformers: Cybertron – ADR Writer
- Voltron: The Third Dimension – ADR Writer
- Vytor: The Starfire Champion – writer
- Widget – writer
- Zatoichi – ADR Writer

=== Story editor ===
- Astro Boy – Executive Story Editor
- Cowboy Bebop – Story Editor
- Denver, the Last Dinosaur – Executive Story Editor
- Mix Master – Story Editor
  - Final Force
  - King of Cards
- Naruto – Executive Story Editor
  - Seasons 1 & 2
- Saber Rider and the Star Sheriffs – Executive Story Editor
- Shinzo – Story Editor
- Voltron – Executive Story Editor
  - Voltron: The Third Dimension – Executive Story Editor
- Vytor: The Starfire Champion – Story Editor

=== Casting ===
- Mix Master – Casting Director
- Nomad: The Warrior – Voice Casting

=== Actor ===
- Mix Master – Zombie, Wrestler (voice)
- No Place to Hide – Student
- Sole Survivor – Undercover Cop
