= Eagle Riders =

Television series

- Also known as: Saban's Eagle Riders
- Based on: Gatchaman II and Gatchaman Fighter by Ippei Kuri
- Written by: R.D. Smithee; Marc Handler; Dayna Barron; Melora Harte; Michael Sorich; Richard Epcar; Ronni Pear; Steve Kramer; Tom Wyner; Winston Richard
- Voices of: Dena Burton; Richard Cansino; Lara Cody; Bryan Cranston; R. Martin Klein; Heidi Lenhart; Mona Marshall; Greg O'Neill; Paul Schrier; Peter Spellos
- Theme music composer: Shuki Levy; Kussa Mahchi; Jeremy Sweet
- Composers: Shuki Levy; Kussa Mahchi; Larry Seymour
- Countries of origin: United States; Japan
- Original language: English
- No. of episodes: 65 (list of episodes)

Production
- Executive producer: Eric S. Rollman
- Producer: Rita M. Acosta
- Animator: Tatsunoko Production
- Production company: Saban Entertainment

Original release
- Network: First-run syndication (1996); Network Ten (1997)
- Release: September 9, 1996 – December 4, 1997

Eagle Riders (also known as Saban's Eagle Riders) is an animated television adaptation of the Japanese anime series Gatchaman II and Gatchaman Fighter, which have been combined. It was produced by Saban Entertainment. 65 episodes aired in Australia on Network Ten from August 14, 1997, to December 4, 1997. In the United States, 13 episodes had previously aired in first-run syndication during the fall of 1996 and 1997.

== Premise ==
Earth is under siege from the alien menace known only by the name Cybercon and its legion of android forces, the Vorak. The Global Security Council convenes to address this problem, and calls upon Dr. Thaddeus Keane for assistance. They remember the aid they had received from Keane's special force, the Eagle Riders, in years past. Keane assures them that the Eagle Riders are still together, still strong, and armed with brand new weapons.

== Production ==
Saban first trademarked the show's name in 1995, and recorded their dub afterwards. R. Martin Klein, who voiced the villain Mallanox, said in a 2022 interview that he recorded his lines for the show at Wally Burr Recording in Burbank, California. He also described his portrayal of Mallanox as having comedic elements to it. The Eagle Rider Kelly was voiced by Heidi Lenhart, who is the stepdaughter of Saban Entertainment founder Haim Saban. Bryan Cranston, the voice of Eagle Rider Joe, had earlier done voice work for Saban on Mighty Morphin Power Rangers, and he went on to collaborate with Haim Saban again for the 2017 Power Rangers film.

In a 2006 interview, one of the writers, Marc Handler, stated that Eagle Riders was "not a good rendition", and that the scripts often lacked continuity with each other. Several episodes were credited as being written by R.D. Smithee, a pseudonym similar to the Alan Smithee pseudonym that has been used when writers and directors are too ashamed to have their names credited in projects they have worked on.

=== Adaptations and changes ===
Both series were heavily edited when it came to the adaptation process, with controversial elements removed, as well as the entire soundtrack being replaced with a new one by Shuki Levy and Larry Seymour and the entire sound effects being replaced with new ones. As with previous English adaptations of Gatchaman, character names and terms were also changed in the localization.

One notable example of the changes made to the series is the removal of Mallanox (Gel Sadra)'s origin and transformation, which happened in the premiere episode of the original Gatchaman II. The character was also changed from female to male, though her correct gender and origin were reinstated in later dub episodes.

Another change, made to segue the two series together, involved the finale of Gatchaman II and the first episode of Gatchaman Fighter being merged, as well as the death of Gel Sadra being cut. Instead, Mallanox is said to have been transformed into a new form, named Happy Boy (originally, the Gatchaman Fighter villain Count Egobossler).

The final eight episodes of Gatchaman Fighter were never translated, due to the objectionable content involved. Instead, the 15th episode of Gatchaman Fighter served as the series finale.

== Release and reception ==
During its 1996–97 syndication run in the US, the show was being aired alongside the first season of Dragon Ball Z, another anime that had been adapted in conjunction with Saban Entertainment. At the time, the two programs attracted minor controversy. A 1997 report on violence in television by UCLA stated that "Eagle Riders and Dragon Ball Z both contain images of mean-spirited, glorified fighting. One episode of Eagle Riders shows a hero viciously throwing metal stars in the faces of different villains."

Even after the syndication run had ended, the initial 13 episodes were still being aired on certain local stations as late as summer 1997, before the remaining 52 episodes saw a release in Australia from August 1997 to December 1997. They aired at 7.30am Mondays to Thursdays on the morning cartoon block Cheez TV. Some episodes that never aired in the USA were shown at the 1997 GachaCon fan convention, which had Eagle Riders producer Rita Acosta as a guest.

Ken Innes of Absolute Anime wrote in his review, "The first thirteen episodes were a nearly straight translation of Gatchaman II with a few embellishments [...] If there is any hope for a further US release, it will be on cable. Unfortunately, it appears this is as good as it gets. I had the opportunity to preview some of the later episodes in July 1997. They were a major disappointment." He also states that "the new background music is intrusive and doesn't compare to Hoyt Curtin's work in Battle of the Planets, but it is an improvement over the original G-II background music."

=== Stations ===
City	Station
Boston	WLVI 56
Chicago	WFLD 32
Cincinnati	WSTR 64
Dayton	WRGT 45
Des Moines	KDSM 17
Fort Pierce	WTVX 34
Fort Myers	WFTX 36
Fort Wayne	WFFT 55
Hartford	WTIC 61
Los Angeles	KCAL 9
Milwaukee	WVTV 18
New York	WPIX 11
Orlando	WKCF 18
Pittsburgh	WPTT 22
Portland	WPXT 51
Providence	WNAC 64
Salinas	KCBA 35
San Francisco	KOFY 20
St. Petersburg	WTTA 38
Tulsa	KTFO 41

== Home video ==
Eagle Riders has never been released on home video or streaming, and only exists via US and Australian television recordings. The current American ownership of the series is unclear, but all of Saban's rights to the Gatchaman property were originally set to expire on September 7, 2004. However, in 2001 Saban was purchased by Disney, with Disney presumably losing the rights in 2004.

== Episodes ==
No.	Title	Original release date
1	"For The Global Good"	September 13, 1996 (USA)
2	"Temple Island"	September 20, 1996 (USA)
3	"Visit To Alcatraz"	September 27, 1996 (USA)
4	"Reunion"	October 4, 1996 (USA)
5	"Primal Instinct"	August 21, 1997 (Australia)
6	"Old Friends, New Enemies"	October 11, 1996 (USA)
7	"Camouflage"	August 26, 1997 (Australia)
8	"On the Far Side of the Moon"	August 27, 1997 (Australia)
9	"Pyramid Power"	August 28, 1997 (Australia)
10	"Deep Freeze in the South Seas"	September 1, 1997 (Australia)
11	"Second Chances"	September 2, 1997 (Australia)
12	"Signs of Intelligent Life"	September 3, 1997 (Australia)
13	"Under the Volcano"	September 4, 1997 (Australia)
14	"Abduction and Return"	September 8, 1997 (Australia)
15	"The Island Girl's Secret"	October 18, 1996 (USA)
16	"Big Eye Meets Small Fry"	October 25, 1996 (USA)
17	"Realities"	September 11, 1997 (Australia)
18	"The Impostor"	November 1, 1996 (USA)
19	"Crisis!"	September 16, 1997 (Australia)
20	"Panic at the North Pole"	September 17, 1997 (Australia)
21	"Circuits Down"	September 18, 1997 (Australia)
22	"Professor Andro's World"	November 8, 1996 (USA)
23	"The Mysterious Dr. Aikens, Part 1"	November 15, 1996 (USA)
24	"The Mysterious Dr. Aikens, Part 2"	November 22, 1996 (USA)
25	"K3"	September 25, 1997 (Australia)
26	"Coward of the Cosmos"	September 29, 1997 (Australia)
27	"Down in the Alps"	September 30, 1997 (Australia)
28	"Remembrance"	October 1, 1997 (Australia)
29	"Shake Down in the Big Apple"	October 2, 1997 (Australia)
30	"Adventure in the Amazon"	October 6, 1997 (Australia)
31	"Old Ties"	October 7, 1997 (Australia)
32	"Childish Things"	October 8, 1997 (Australia)
33	"Facing the Dragon"	October 9, 1997 (Australia)
34	"Hide and Seek"	October 13, 1997 (Australia)
35	"Wild Country"	October 14, 1997 (Australia)
36	"Mallanox in a Mess"	November 29, 1996 (USA)
37	"Evil in Disguise"	December 6, 1996 (USA)
38	"Krall"	October 20, 1997 (Australia)
39	"Mission to Mars"	October 21, 1997 (Australia)
40	"Unnatural Disasters"	October 22, 1997 (Australia)
41	"Identities"	October 23, 1997 (Australia)
42	"Fire and Ice"	October 27, 1997 (Australia)
43	"Catastrophe"	October 28, 1997 (Australia)
44	"Falling Prey"	October 29, 1997 (Australia)
45	"Relativity"	October 30, 1997 (Australia)
46	"Allegiance and Amends"	November 3, 1997 (Australia)
47	"Encounter with Evil"	November 4, 1997 (Australia)
48	"A New Threat"	November 5, 1997 (Australia)
49	"The New Resistance"	November 6, 1997 (Australia)
50	"Conflict Of Melly Island"	November 10, 1997 (Australia)
51	"One to One"	November 11, 1997 (Australia)
52	"The Steel City"	November 12, 1997 (Australia)
53	"Energy Crisis"	November 13, 1997 (Australia)
54	"Negotiations"	November 17, 1997 (Australia)
55	"The Document"	November 18, 1997 (Australia)
56	"Rebel Defiance"	November 19, 1997 (Australia)
57	"Outbreak"	November 20, 1997 (Australia)
58	"Wild Ride"	November 24, 1997 (Australia)
59	"Uncle Avery"	November 25, 1997 (Australia)
60	"Ollie Undercover"	November 26, 1997 (Australia)
61	"The Price of Glory"	November 27, 1997 (Australia)
62	"Scorpius Force"	December 1, 1997 (Australia)
63	"A Ray of Hope"	December 2, 1997 (Australia)
64	"The Lost Children of Melly"	December 3, 1997 (Australia)
65	"Vorak Resolution"	December 4, 1997 (Australia)

- In Eagle Riders' run in America, only a select 13 of the 65 episodes were aired, with a few of them having been picked from later in the series.
- Eagle Riders was also one of the first series broadcast on the UK's version of Fox Kids, although the entire series was never shown, stopping at episode 47 (coincidentally the last episode featuring Gatchaman II material).
- The episodes excluded from Gatchaman II in the adaptation include: 6, 16, 17, 28, and 35. Episodes 3, 4, 8–11, 13, 14, 16–19, 21–24, 26, 27, 29, 34, 38–39, and 41-48 of Gatchaman Fighter were also untranslated, though footage from the finale made it into the opening sequence and as stock footage in one episode.
- When Eagle Riders began adapting Gatchaman Fighter, Saban cut and merged parts of episodes into single stories, along with merging the finale of Gatchaman II with the premiere of Fighter.

== Character variations ==
=== Team variations in different versions ===
Gatchaman	Battle of the Planets	G-Force	Eagle Riders	OVA (Harmony Gold dub)	Rank	Bird Uniform	Weapon	Mecha	Voice actor (Gatchaman)	Voice actor (Gatchaman OVA)	Voice actor (BOTP)	Voice actor (G-Force)	Voice actor (Harmony Gold OVA dub)	Voice actor (Eagle Riders)	Voice actor (ADV TV/Sentai OVA dub)
Ken Washio	Mark	Ace Goodheart	Hunter Harris	Ken the Eagle	G1	Eagle	Razor boomerang	Airplane	Katsuji Mori	Masaya Onosaka	Casey Kasem	Sam Fontana	Eddie Frierson	Richard Cansino	Leraldo Anzaldua
George "Joe" Asakura	Jason	Dirk Daring	Joseph "Joe" Thax	Joe the Condor	G2	Condor	Pistol	Race Car	Isao Sasaki	Kōji Ishii	Ronnie Schell	Cam Clarke	Richard Cansino	Bryan Cranston	Brian Jepson
Jun	Princess	Agatha "Aggie" June	Kelly Jennar	June the Swan	G3	Swan	Yo-yo	Motorcycle	Kazuko Sugiyama	Michiko Neya	Janet Waldo	Barbara Goodson	Lara Cody	Heidi Lenhart	Kim Prause
Jinpei	Keyop	Pee Wee	Mickey Dugan	Jimmy the Falcon	G4	Swallow	Bolo	Dune Buggy	Yoku Shioya	Rica Matsumoto	Alan Young	Barbara Goodson	Mona Marshall	Mona Marshall	Luci Christian
Ryu Nakanishi	Tiny Harper	Hoot "Hooty" Owl	Ollie Keeawani	Rocky the Owl	G5	Owl	Pistol	God Phoenix	Shingo Kanemoto	Fumihiko Tachiki	Alan Dinehart	Jan Rabson/ Gregg Berger	Richard Epcar	Paul Schrier	Victor Carsrud

=== Other character variations across different versions ===
Gatchaman	Battle of the Planets	G-Force	Eagle Riders	OVA (Harmony Gold Dub)	Voice actor (Gatchaman)	Voice actor (Gatchaman OVA)	Voice actor (BOTP)	Voice actor (G-Force)	Voice actor (Eagle Riders)	Voice actor (Harmony Gold OVA dub)	Voice actor (ADV TV/Sentai OVA dub)
Dr. Kozaburo Nambu-hakase	Chief Anderson	Dr. Benjamin Brighthead	Dr. Thaddeus Keane	Dr. Kozaburo Nambu	Tōru Ōhira	Alan Dinehart	Jan Rabson/Gregg Berger	Ikuya Sawaki	Michael McConnohie	Greg O'Neill	Andy McAvin
ISO Director Anderson	President Kane	Anderson / Cmdr. Todd (some episodes)	Anderson	Director Anderson	Teiji Ōmiya	Michael Rye	Jan Rabson/Gregg Berger	Yonehiko Kitagawa	Michael Forest		Marty Fleck
Red Impulse / Kentaro Washio	Col. Cronos	Red Impulse / Kendrick Goodheart	Red Impulse / Harley Harris	Red Spectre / Kentaro Washio		Keye Luke	Cam Clarke	Unshō Ishizuka	Bob Papenbrook		John Tyson
Berg Katse	Zoltar	Galactor	Lukan	Solaris	Mikio Terashima	Keye Luke	Bill Capizzi	Kaneto Shiozawa	R. Martin Klein		Edwin Neal
Sosai (Leader) X	O Luminous One / The Great Spirit	Computor	Cybercon	Lord Zortek	Nobuo Tanaka	Keye Luke	Jan Rabson/Gregg Berger	Nobuo Tanaka	Ralph Votrais	Peter Spellos	Winston Parish
Gel Sadra			Mallanox		Masaru Ikeda						R. Martin Klein
Sylvie Pandora-hakase			Dr. Francine Aikens		Dr. Sylvie Pandora	Miyuka Ieda					Lara Cody
Announcer						Hideo Kinoshita/Shūsei Nakamura	William Woodson (Main) / Alan Young (Zark)	Norm Prescott			George Manley

=== Other notable changes ===
Variations	Gatchaman (Japanese)	Battle of the Planets	Guardians of Space	Eagle Riders	OVA (English, Harmony Gold)	Gatchaman (English)
Identity change command	Bird, go!‡	Transmute!	G-Force, transform!	Initiate Eagle Mode, now!	Ken / Eagle One, transform!; Joe / Shapeshift, Condor!; June / Swan Mode, now!; Jimmy / Falcon Tracker, transform!	Bird, go!
Enemy planet	Selectol	Spectra	Galactor	Vorak	Galactor	Selectol
Enemy civilization	Galactor (Gyarakutā)	Spectra	Galactor	Vorak	Galactor	Galactor

‡The original Japanese-language version of Gatchaman contains a small number of words in English.

== Production staff ==
- Owned and distributed by: Saban Entertainment
- Executive Producer: Eric S. Rollman
- Producer & Story Editor: Rita M. Acosta
- Writer (ADR Script): R.D. Smithee, Marc Handler
- Voice Directors: Richard Epcar, Steve Kramer, Heidi Lenhart (uncredited), Michael Sorich
- Production Assistant & ADR Coordinator: Gregory C. Ireland
- Executive in Charge of Sound Operations: Clive H. Mizumoto
- Sound Operations Manager: Xavier Garcia
- Sound Effects Editors: Keith Dickens, Martin Flores, Zoli Osaze, Ron Salaises, John Valentino
- Re-Recording Mixers: Michael Beirenger (uncredited), Mark Ettel, R.D. Floyd, Wayne T. O'Brien
- ADR Recordists: Carl Lange, Kevin Newson, David W. Barr
- Foley Artists: Susan Lewis (uncredited), Kalea Morton, Taryn Simone
- Audio Assistants: Brian Densmore, Andrew Kines, Don Sexton
- Music by: Shuki Levy, Kussa Mahchi
- Executive in Charge of Music: Ron Kenan
- Music Supervisor: Lloyd Michael Cook II
- Music Editors: Barron Abramovitch, Bill Filipiak
- Music Engineer: Barron Abramovitch
- Second Engineers: James Dijulio, Frank Bailey-Meier
- Music Assistants: Jeremy Sweet, Tim Gosselin
- Offline Editor: Terry Marlin
- Video Traffic Coordinator: Jerry Buetnner
- Postproduction Audio: Advantage Audio
- Sound Effects Editor: Robert Duran
- Dialogue Editor: Robbi Smith
- Music Editor: Marc S. Perlman
- Audio Transfer: J. Lampinen
- Re-Recording Mixers: Fil Brown, Ray Leonard, Mike Beiriger, Jim Hodson, Mellisa Gentry-Ellis
- Online Editors: Michael Hutchinson, Harvey Landy (Hollywood Digital Inc.), John Bowen, David Crosthwait (Modern Videofilm)
- Telecine: Lee Ann Went (Varitel Inc.), Greg Hamlin (Film Technology, LA), Larry Field (Editel), Brent Eldridge (Ame, Inc.)
- Postproduction Supervisor: John Bryant
- Postproduction Coordinator: Francesca Weiss
- Executive in Charge of Production: Dana C. Booton

=== Voice cast ===
- Hunter Harris: Richard Cansino
- Joe Thax: Bryan Cranston
- Kelly Jenar: Heidi Lenhart
- Mickey Dugan: Mona Marshall
- Ollie Keeawani: Paul Schrier
- Dr.Thaddeus Keane: Greg O'Neill
- Dr.Francine Aikens: Lara Cody
- Auto: Dena Burton
- Mallanox: R. Martin Klein
- Cybercon: Peter Spellos
- Misc. (uncredited): Joshua Seth, Bob Bergen, Julie Maddalena, Richard Epcar
