= Melora Harte =

American voice actress (born 1943)

- Born: October 29, 1943 (age 82); Los Angeles, California, U.S.
- Other name: Marylin Lane
- Occupation: Voice actress
- Years active: 1982–present
- Notable credits: Gestalt as Carmine; Power Rangers Zeo as Archerina; Robotech as Musica; Silent Möbius as Rally Cheyenne; Tenchi Muyo! as Seto Kamiki Jurai
- Spouse: Steve Kramer

Melora Harte (born October 29, 1943) is an American voice actress. In addition to voice acting in anime, she also adapted and directed several anime dubs. Her husband, Steve Kramer, is also a voice actor.

== Filmography ==
=== Voice roles ===
- Akira - Kiyoko (Streamline dub), Additional Voices (Streamline and Geneon dubs)
- Buso Renkin - Chisato Wakamiya
- Cowboy Bebop - Additional Voices
- Cyborg 009 - Cyborg 0012
- Dirty Pair - Spaceport Announcement Voice
- El-Hazard - Afura Mann
- Fighting Spirit - Various
- Flint the Time Detective - Various
- Gankutsuou: The Count of Monte Cristo - Various
- Geneshaft - Lisa, Anne, Kei
- Gestalt - Carmine
- Hello Kitty's Paradise - Various
- Honeybee Hutch - Various
- Jin Jin and the Panda Patrol - Various
- Kyo Kara Maoh! - Gloria, Norika
- The Little Polar Bear - Additional Voices
- Macross Plus - Sharon Apple
- Maple Town - Various
- Megazone 23 - Cindy (International Dub)
- Nightwalker - Miharu Akiba
- Noozles - Additional Voices
- Pilot Candidate - Teela Zain Elmes, Narrator
- Power Rangers Zeo - Archerina (uncredited)
- Paranoia Agent - Old Woman
- Robotech - Musica
- Saint Tail - Mother (Eimi Haneoka) – also Co-Director
- Silent Möbius - Rally Cheyenne (Streamline Dub)
- Space Adventure Cobra - Various
- Tenchi Muyo! Ryo-Ohki OVA 3 and Tenchi Muyo! GXP - Seto Kamiki Jurai
- The Boy and the Heron - Eriko (Maid #3)
- Twilight of the Dark Master - Additional Voices
- Wicked City - Soap Girl (Streamline Dub)
- Willy Fog 2 - Princess Romy
- Wisdom of the Gnomes - Various
- Zorro the Chronicles

=== Live-Action ===
- Attack of the 5 Ft. 2 In. Women - Tonya's Coach
- Dante's Cove - Kevin's Mother
- Doctor Duck's Super Secret All-Purpose Sauce - Herself
- Highway to Heaven - Waitress
- It's Always Sunny in Philadelphia - Woman (Suburban House)
- Waiting to Act - Waitress

=== Video games ===
- Inherit the Earth: Quest for the Orb - Various
- Might and Magic: World of Xeen - Various
- Might and Magic VII: For Blood and Honor - Various
- Robotech: Battlecry - Helena Chase
- Star Trek: Judgment Rites - Maria, Pupil, Console, Moll

=== Staff credits ===
- Bobobo-bo Bo-bobo - Adaptation
- Requiem from the Darkness - Adaptation
- The Wisdom of The Gnomes - Adaptation, Writer
- Gatchaman 94 OVA - Casting Director
- Honeybee Hutch - Writer, Voice Director
- Geneshaft - ADR Script
- Saint Tail - Co-Director
- Tenchi in Tokyo - Writer
- Vampire Princess Miyu TV - Writer
- Jungle Tales - Writer
- Grimm's Fairy Tale Classics - Writer
- Sandokan - Writer
- Ox Tales - Writer
- Wowser - Writer
- The Littl' Bits - Writer
- Samurai Pizza Cats - Writer
- Bob in a Bottle - Writer
- Maya the Bee - Writer
- Noozles - Writer
- Iznogoud - Writer
- Gulliver's Travels - Writer
- Jin Jin and the Panda Patrol - Writer
- Mighty Morphin Power Rangers - Writer
- Saban's Adventures of Peter Pan - Writer
- Saban's Adventures of Pinocchio - Writer
- Saban's Adventures of the Little Mermaid - Writer
- Around the World in Eighty Dreams - Writer
- The Secret Files of the Spy Dogs - Writer
- Big Bad Beetleborgs - Writer
- Digimon Adventure - Writer
- VR Troopers - Writer
- Flint the Time Detective - Writer
- Sailor Moon S - Writer (Viz Media dub)
- Gatchaman - Casting Director
- DNA Sights 999.9 - Talent Coordinator
- Hurricane Polymar - Talent Coordinator
- Angel Tales - Talent Coordinator
- Shinzo - Talent Coordinator
- When in Rome - Loup Group Coordinator
- The Twilight of the Golds - ADR Loop Group
- Nice Guys Sleep Alone - ADR Loop Group
