= Dinozaurs =

Japanese toy line and television series

- Logo for the English version
- Also known as: Dinozaurs: The Series
- ダイノゾーン
- Genre: Mecha, action
- Created by: Hajime Yatate
- Screenplay by: Tom Wyner; Marc Handler; Steve Kramer; Tony Oliver
- Story by: Yasuko Kobayashi
- Directed by: Kiyoshi Fukumoto
- Music by: English version; Haim Saban; Shuki Levy; Japanese version; Shirō Hamaguchi; Akifumi Tada
- Countries of origin: Japan; United States
- Original language: English
- No. of episodes: 26

Production
- Executive producers: Dana C. Booton; Eric S. Rollman; Clive H. Mizumoto; Mark Tsuji; Satoru Matsumoto
- Producers: Eiji Sashida; Kinuyo Nozaki
- Editor: Tom Wyner
- Production companies: Sunrise; Saban Entertainment

Original release
- Network: Fox Kids
- Release: July 28 – November 30, 2000

Related
- Original video animation
- Directed by: Tetsurō Amino
- Produced by: Eiji Sashida
- Written by: Tetsurō Amino
- Music by: Shirō Hamaguchi
- Studio: Sunrise D.I.D.
- Released: November 27, 1998 – January 2000
- Episodes: 5

Dinozaurs, known in Japan as Dinozone (ダイノゾーン, Dainozōn), is a Japanese toyline created by toy company Bandai in 1998. Alongside the toys, two media adaptations were created by Sunrise: a 5-episode 3D CGI OVA series that ran from November 27, 1998, to January 2000 and a 26-episode animated television series that aired on Fox Kids from July 28 to November 30, 2000.

== Plot ==
65,000,000 years ago, aliens known as the Dragozaurs came from space to Earth in order to absorb the planet's life force. The planet responded by converting a select number of prehistoric animals, including dinosaurs, into the Dino Knights in order to defend it. The Dragozaurs resurface in the present day to collect the planet's life force, and the Dino Knights re-awaken from their long slumber in order to stop them.

== Characters ==
=== Dino Knights ===
When the Dragozaurs first attack Earth, the planet converts a select number of prehistoric animals into the Dino Knights (ダイノソルジャー, Dinosoldiers) in order to fight them. Normally fossilized, a Dino Knight assumes a more metallic form when re-animated. The command to power up the Dino Knights with the Dino Daggers is "Dino Power, Energize!". The Dino Knights' fossil forms reside in the Dinotarium. The Dino Knights are:

Dino Tyranno (ダイノティラノ, Daino Tirano)
Voiced by: Toshiyuki Morikawa (Japanese); Kim Strauss (English)
Dino Tyranno is the leader of the Dino Knights. He wields the Silver Sword (Grand Slasher). He has a rivalry with Gigano Dragon since prehistoric times. He is knocked into an erupting volcano by Dark Dragon, but becomes an Ultimate Dino Knight when Dino Rhamph's energy boost revitalizes him and grants him the Mega Blade Broad Sword, with which he uses the "Fire Flame Strike" attack. His dinosaur form is a Tyrannosaurus. Only a toy version of his regular form was made.
Dino Brachio (ダイノブラキオ, Daino Burakio)
Voiced by: Tesshō Genda (Japanese); Tom Wyner (English)
Second-in-command, Dino Brachio serves as Tyranno's advisor and is the biggest, oldest, and wisest of the Dino Knights. Brachio would prefer to settling the Dragozaur problem peacefully. He wields the Axe of Valor (Grand Axe). His dinosaur form is a Brachiosaurus.
Dino Tricera (ダイノトリケラ, Daino Torikera)
Voiced by: Shō Hayami (Japanese); Joey Camen (English)
Dino Tricera wields the Tricera Spears of Jade (Bone Daggers). He becomes an Ultimate Dino Knight when Dino Rhamph's energy boost revitalizes him and grants him the Triple-Threat Halberd, with which he uses the "Lightning Bolt Strike" attack. Like Stego, his favorite pastime is fighting the Dragozaurs. His dinosaur form is a Triceratops. Only a toy version of his regular form was made.
Dino Stego (ダイノステゴ, Daino Sutego)
Voiced by: Hōchū Ōtsuka (Japanese); Peter Lurie (English)
Dino Stego is the "tough guy" of the Dino Knights. He likes nothing better than fighting the Dragozaurs. His weapon is the Stego Skeletal Revolution (Spinal Bone) where his chest rotates, spinning any enemy around and around. His dinosaur form is a Stegosaurus. It was revealed that he had a girlfriend named Daisy where part of her fossil is in the possession of Dr. Gale.
Dino Sabre (ダイノサーベル, Daino Sāberu; Dino Saber)
Voiced by: Kenji Nojima (Japanese); Doug Erholtz (English)
Dino Sabre is one of the youngest of the Dino Knights and does not mind having fun with the Dragozaurs as well. He wields the Saber Wailing Whip (Tiger Whip). His prehistoric mammal form is a Smilodon.
Dino Ptera (ダイノプテラ, Daino Putera)
Voiced by: Hideo Ishikawa (Japanese); Lenore Zann (most episodes), Philece Sampler (in "For the Earth") (English)
One of the few female Dino Knights, Dino Ptera serves as an aerial recon for the Dino Knights and is often the one who fights Drago Wing in aerial battles. She attacks with the Ptera Bristle Boomerang (Wing Boomerang). Her pterosaur form is a Pteranodon.
Dino Mammoth (ダイノマンモス, Daino Manmosu)
Voiced by: Hiroomi Sugino (Japanese); Beau Billingslea (English)
A very sane and competent member of the Dino Knights, Dino Mammoth wields the Mammoth Tusks of Vigor (Big Tusk Spear). His prehistoric mammal form is a Mammoth.

==== Cerazaur Brothers ====
The Cerazaur Brothers are three Dino Knights that were found by Rick. By the command "Triblade Fusion! Integrate!", they can combine to form Dino Triblades (大剣者トリブレードス, Daikensha Toriburēdos, Great Swordsman Triblades) who wields the Triple Fossil Star Sword and is the largest of the Dino Knights.

Dino Centro (ダイノセントロス, Daino Sentorosu; Dino Centros)
Voiced by: Kohsuke Toriumi (Japanese); Wally Wingert (English)
Dino Centro is a Centrosaurus who wields the Fossil Sun Sword. He forms the left arm of Dino Triblades.
Dino Toro (ダイノカスモス, Daino Kasumosu; Dino Chasmos)
Voiced by: Katsuya Shiga (Japanese); Daran Norris (English)
Dino Toro is a Torosaurus and the brother of Dino Centro who wields the Fossil Moon Sword. He forms the right arm of Dino Triblades. In the Japanese version, Dino Toro was a Chasmosaurus.
Dino Styraco (ダイノステラス, Daino Suterasu; Dino Styras)
Voiced by: Yasunori Matsumoto (Japanese); Richard Epcar (English)
Dino Styraco is a Styracosaurus and is Centro and Toro's older brother. Styraco wields the Styraco Sword of Stealth. He forms the head, main torso, and legs of Dino Triblades.

==== Dino Weapons ====
The Dino Weapons (ウェポンザウルス・ダイノアームズ, Weponsaurusu Daino Āmusu; Weaponsaurus DinoArms) are Dino Knights that can become weapons outside of their dinosaur and warrior forms and can attach to any Dino Knight. They are found on an island and were nearly abducted by Gomez. Once Dino Tyranno and Dino Brachio get the three Dino Weapons to regain their memories, they help Dino Tyranno and Dino Brachio fend off the Drago Clones and the Dragozaurs.

Dino Pachy (ソードサウルス, Sōdosaurusu; Swordsaurus)
Voiced by: Daisuke Ishikawa (Japanese); Wally Wingert (English)
Dino Pachy's dinosaur form is a Pachycephalosaurus and his Dino Weapon mode is the Pachy Spike Sword. His sword form is first used by Tyranno and later by Brachio after Dino Tyranno's upgrade. He is the only one trapped by Gomez, but is freed when he regains his memory and his change into his warrior form breaks the cage he is in.
Dino Kenty (ドリルサウルス, Dorirusaurusu; Drillsaurus)
Voiced by: Nobuyuki Tanaka (Japanese); James Arnold Taylor (English)
Dino Kenty's dinosaur form is a Kentrosaurus and his Dino Weapon mode is the Kenty Skeletal Drill. His drill form is first used by Dino Brachio and later by Dino Stego.
Dino Arch (シールドサウルス, Shīrudosaurusu; Shieldsaurus)
Voiced by: Takehiro Murozono (Japanese); Bob Glouberman (English)
Dino Arch's dinosaur form is an Archelon and his Dino Weapon mode is the Arch Bone Shield. His shield form is first used by Dino Tyranno and later by Dino Brachio and Dino Icthyo after Dino Tyranno's upgrade. Dino Arch later falls in love with Dino Icthyo.

==== Other Dino Knights ====
Dino Icthyo (ダイノイクチオ, Daino Ikuchio)
Voiced by: Miki Yoshino (Japanese); Wendee Lee (English)
Also called "Theo", Dino Icthyo is another female Dino Knight and is the last to be discovered. Her prehistoric animal form is an Ichthyosaurus. Dino Ichthyo wields the Trident of the Tides, uses a bubble-themed attack on her enemies which she calls "Bubble Blast", and can also do a "Flipper Storm". Her legs can fold into a flipper to enable her to fight underwater. Dino Icthyo becomes the love interest of Dino Arch. Her fossil was worshiped by the people of Atlantis. She is the only one of the current Dino Knights not to have known a toy made of her.
Dino Rhamph (レーザーリンクス, Rēzā Rinkusu; Razor Rhynchus)
A legendary Dino Knight known as the Phoenix in some cultures, Dino Rhamph is the most powerful Dino Knight but does not talk much. He cannot be destroyed and is a creature who rises to protect the Earth in her hour of need. According to Dino Brachio, Dino Rhamph can exert control over life force itself. At one point, Diamond Ryugu harnessed his power for a weapon. His pterosaur form is a Rhamphorhynchus. Like Dino Icthyo, he did not receive a toy in the toyline.

=== Dragozaurs ===
The Dragozaurs (デスイーター, Desu Ītā; Death Eaters) are an alien race who are the antagonists of the series. They feed off of a planet's life force, causing the planet to be lifeless and in ruins. The Dragozaurs are:

Diamond Ryugu (ダイモンリューグ, Daimon Ryūgu)
Voiced by: Ikuya Sawaki (Japanese); Diane Salinger (most episodes), Catherine Battistone (in episodes 21-22, 24-26) (English)
The primary antagonist of the series, Diamond Ryugu is the leader of the Dragozaurs. Only her eyes are seen and her voice heard, usually leaving Drago Wing, Gigano Dragon, and Dark Dragon to do her bidding. Her dinosaur form is a gigantic Ankylosaurus with her warrior form coming out of its back. Diamond Ryugu devours the life force of planets to become stronger. After being defeated by Dino Tyranno, she is shrunken down and taken away by Drago Wing in return for not harming Earth. Along with the generic Dragozaurs, she did not receive a toy.
Gigano Dragon (ギガノドラゴン, Gigano Doragon; 2-12, 23-26)
Voiced by: Tomomichi Nishimura (Japanese); Bob Papenbrook (English)
Gigano Dragon is Dino Tyranno's rival, armed with a blade on his left arm called the Gigano Sword in the Japanese version. His creature form is a Chinese dragon, he is a vicious fighter who is indifferent to Diamond Ryugu's plans and would rather focus on getting his revenge against Tyranno, which leads to his death. Gigano Dragon is then resurrected by Dark Dragon from a Chinese dragon fossil with a power link up with Drago Wing which grants his warrior form flight. He is destroyed during his last duel with Tyranno when both rivals clash their swords for the last time. Upon his death, Gigano Dragon parts on good terms with Tyranno as Gigano Dragon silently acknowledges Tyranno's victory in his last moments.
Drago Wing (ナイトウイング, Naito Uingu; Night Wing)
Voiced by: Masato Hirano (Japanese); Steve Blum (English)
Field commander to the Dragozaur Armies, Drago Wing can drain any opponent of their life force as seen in one episode where he ambushed Dino Ptera and drained her life force enough to reduce her back to her fossilized form. His animal form is a giant vampire bat. Sneaky and underhanded, Drago Wing tends to be insulted by both Gigano Dragon and Dark Dragon when his plans fail. One of his weapons is "Night Blade". Later episodes had Drago Wing getting a power link up where he can combine with Gigano Dragon to grant him flight. He survives the end of the series and escorts a tiny Diamond Ryugu away from Earth.
Dark Dragon (14-24)
Voiced by: Daran Norris
A Dragozaur wizard who once betrayed the Dragozaurs, Dark Dragon is an old enemy of the Dino Knights. His normal form is a humanoid one. When fighting, Dark Dragon changes into a European dragon with a blade on its right wrist. He also has the ability to manipulate and produce bats as well as other powers. Dark Dragon is very intelligent and relies on subtle manipulation for his plans. Though he is extremely powerful, the only villain surpassing Dark Dragon is Diamond Ryugu herself. He is then destroyed by Dino Tyranno near the finale. He is known as "Draco Draconus" in the toyline.
Dragozaur Army Forces
Voiced by: Michael Sorich, Ardwight Chamberlain, David Lodge, Peter Lurie, Kirk Thornton
The Dragozaur Army Forces are foot soldiers modeled after the forms of Tyrannosaurus, Triceratops, and Pteranodon and cannot change into warrior forms. Dark Dragon also calls forth bats from thin air to form his version of the Dragozaur Army Forces.

==== Drago Clones ====
Created by Diamond Ryugu using the power of the Dark Crystal, the Drago Clones (シャドーウォリアー, Shadō Woriā, Shadow Warriors) are clones of the Dinotarium Dino Knights. The Drago Clones are:

Drago Tyran (シャドーティラノ, Shadō Tirano, Shadow Tyranno; 8)
Voiced by: Kōji Ishii (Japanese); Dan Woren (English)
The Dragozaur version of Dino Tyranno and leader of the Drago Clones, he is armed with the Slasher Sword (Dark Slasher). He is accidentally destroyed by Drago Ceratops.
Drago Ceratops (シャドートリケラ, Shadō Torikera, Shadow Tricera; 8-21)
Voiced by: David Lodge
The Dragozaur version of Dino Tricera and armed with the Dark Daggers, he took command after the death of Drago Tyran. Due to animation errors, his brow horns in Triceratops mode are sometimes missing.
Drago Brachio (シャドーブラキオ, Shadō Burakio, Shadow Brachio; 8-11)
Voiced by: Kazuhiko Nishimatsu (Japanese); Tom Wyner (English)
The Dragozaur version of Dino Brachio and armed with the Axe of Venom (Dark Axe), he was destroyed when Dino Brachio used Dino Kenty's Skeletal Drill to impale him.
Drago Stegus (シャドーステゴ, Shadō Sutego, Shadow Stego; 8-21)
Voiced by: Kerrigan Mahan
The Dragozaur version of Dino Stego, armed with the Dark Bone.
Drago Dactyl (シャドープテラ, Shadō Putera, Shadow Ptera; 8-21)
Voiced by: Ikuya Sawaki (Japanese); Catherine Battistone (English)
The Dragozaur version of Dino Ptera, armed with the Dark Boomerang.
Drago Tigra (シャドーサーベル, Shadō Sāberu, Shadow Sabel; 8-11)
Voiced by: Richard Cansino
The Dragozaur version of Dino Sabre, armed with the Wicked Whip (Dark Whip).
Drago Elephas (シャドーマンモス, Shadō Manmosu, Shadow Mammoth; 8-21)
Voiced by: Ardwight Chamberlain
The Dragozaur version of Dino Mammoth, armed with the Dark Tusk Spear.

==== Others ====
Supersaurus (スパザウルス, Supazaurusu; 22)
A complete skeleton discovered in Colorado that is delivered to the Dinotarium, Dark Dragon uses his powers on Supersaurus to create havoc in the city streets. Dark Dragon gives the Supersaurus skeleton the ability to absorb the Dino Knights' life force and turn them back into fossils which forces the Dino Knights to find a way to stop the Supersaurus skeleton without touching it. Dr. Naomi Abrams was the one who found that one of its neck bones was not like the other neck bones.

=== Humans ===
Kaito Tatsuno (竜野 海斗, Tatsuno Kaito)
Voiced by: Sayaka Aida (Japanese); Jason Spisak (English)
Kaito is a teenager who is less interested in actual dinosaurs even when his father helps to design the Dinotarium, a place that is a tribute to dinosaurs. When he stumbles upon the Dragozaurs stealing local life force, his cry for the sake of life reawakens the Dino Knights and since then, he has been their ally. He possesses one of three Dino Daggers that can restore a Dino Knight's strength.
Rena
Voiced by: Philece Sampler
Rena is Kaito's friend since kindergarten. She shares Kaito's secret about the Dino Knights. Rena possesses the second Dino Dagger. She cannot swim and has a fear of scorpions, spiders, and ghosts.
Rick
Voiced by: Michael Lindsay
Rick is a cowboy from the west who is good with a lasso and travels on a horse named Lightning. Since the death of his parents, he protects the two fossils that turn out to be two of the three Cerazaur Brothers while living with his grandfather. Only his Dino Dagger can restore their strength. Throughout the series, he becomes close to the Cerazaur brothers, even being accepted as their "fourth brother". When he is trapped by Dark Dragon and the Drago Clones in the Ninja Castle, Styraco gives up his life force to save Rick, but Rick and the other Cerazaur brothers save Styraco. After being saved, the Cerazaur Brothers give Rick a scroll stating that he truly understands the concept of Bushido.
Taki
Voiced by: Doug Erholtz
Taki is a bully that bothers Kaito on different occasions. Despite that, he is a coward when it comes to different occasions like when Rena mentioned that he was afraid to arm-wrestle her. He tries to prove the existence of revived dinosaurs.
Dr. Naomi Abrams (木村 ナオミ, Kimura Naomi; Naomi Kimura)
Voiced by: Miyuki Matsushita (Japanese); Mona Marshall (English)
Naomi is a tour guide at the Dinotarium. Whenever she sees that the Dino Knights are missing, she gets someone to look and the Dino Knights are back she is told to need a vacation which she herself sometimes also believes. Naomi gets along great with Kaito and Rena as they often come to visit the Dinotarium. She is the one who figures out that Supersaurus is being controlled by Dark Dragon by climbing up on its neck while asleep and realizing that one of the neck bones is not like the others, but Naomi faints at the sight of Dino Tyranno. Naomi is told by Dr. Abbot that she was dreaming when she wakes up.
Dr. Abbott
Voiced by: Bob Joles
The manager of the Dinotarium, he is constantly telling Naomi that she is imagining things throughout the series and that "she needs a vacation".
Professor Takuda
Voiced by: Dan Woren
A scientist at the Dinotarium.
Ronnie Tatsuno
Voiced by: Wendee Lee
Kaito's little brother.
Emily
Voiced by: Wendee Lee
Jake Tatsuno
Voiced by: Eddie Frierson
Kaito's father who helped design the Dinotarium.
Dr. Gale
Voiced by: Kirk Thornton
An archaeologist who possesses a Stegosaurus fossil that is a part of Dino Stego's old girlfriend Daisy, he later returns where he excavates the Chinese dragon fossil until it is stolen from him by Gomez.
Gomez
Voiced by: David Lodge
A greedy fossil hunter who tries to collect the Dino Weapons, Gomez and his henchmen are scared away when the Drago Clones invade the island they are on. Gomez later returns and tries to steal Gigano Dragon's fossil from Dr. Gale only to be thwarted by Dark Dragon.
Princess Helen
Voiced by: Peggy O'Neal
Helen is the princess of Atlantis and the daughter of its king. She helps Kaito and Rena retrieve Kaito's Dino Dagger as Kaito and Rena are the "Chosen Ones" she was having visions about. When the Dragozaurs attack Atlantis, Helen convinces her father to let Kaito reclaim his Dino Dagger so that he can reawaken Dino Icthyo. After the Dragozaurs are repelled, Helen and her father disappear into the afterlife alongside the other Atlanteans and implore Kaito, Rena, and the Dino Knights to protect Earth at all costs.

== Episodes ==
1. Dino Knights Revived
  The Dragozaurs have come to Earth to feed on its life force. Meanwhile, on Earth, a teenager named Kaito visits a dinosaur exhibit and discovers that the fossils in the museum are really the Dino Knights. They come to life and prepare to battle the Dragozaurs to save Earth.
2. The Dino Daggers of Friendship
  Gigano Dragon returns to challenge Dino Tyranno, his old enemy. On Earth, Kaito is saved from the school bully by his friend Rena and reveals to her the Dino Knights. In the Dinotarium, fossilized daggers are found, which are really the power source to the Dino Knights. The Dragozaurs wish to control them, and the Dino Knights must battle to get them back.
3. Everything's Relative
  Dino Sabre and Dino Tricera travel to Africa with Kaito and Rena to find traces of relatives, but the Dragozaurs are also there, draining the water springs, and Dino Sabre and Dino Tricera must fight them.
4. Save Dino Ptera
  Drago Wing plants a device to drain all the Earth's life force and Dino Ptera is drained while investigating. The Dino Knights must recharge her and defeat the Dragozaurs.
5. The Battle of the Aurora
  Rena spots an aurora in town, and Dino Mammoth goes to the Arctic to find its source. Rena and Dino Brachio go after him, but both Knights are shrunk by Drago Wing. The only way to restore them is to locate the shrinking device and destroy the Dragozaurs' life-force extractor hidden in the Arctic.
6. A New Friend
  Dino Tyranno, Kaito, and Rena go to New Mexico to find other Dino Knights. There they find the fossils of Toro and Centro, two of the Cerazaur Brothers. Only the Cerazaurs' Dino Dagger is able to awaken them which is in possession of a boy named Rick. They must revive the Cerazaurs without letting Gigano Dragon find out.
7. The Master Swordsman Triblades
  Drago Wing is commanded to destroy Toro and Centro before they find their third brother, Styraco. Rick is helping them, but Drago Wing attacks Toro and Centro. Rick must find Styraco's fossil, and if he does, the three of them will combine into Triblades, a mighty and divine Dino Knight.
8. Battle of the Drago Clones
  Diamond Ryugu makes the Drago Clones, evil versions of the Dino Knights to make up for the Dragozaurs' constant failure. They are ordered to attack the Dino Knights, and they defeat Tyranno, Brachio, Stego and Mammoth. To make matters worse, the Drago Clones use a fear-inducing ray to make Tricera, Sabre and Ptera too afraid to fight. Will they be able to charge themselves up and face their fears?.
9. Long Lost Love
  A Stegosaurus plate is on display in New York, which is Dino Stego's old girlfriend Daisy. Kaito and Rena get Rick to help them recover it for Stego, but the Drago Clones arrive to drain a geyser of life force, forcing Dino Stego to join his comrades.
10. Rick's Big Adventure
  The Cerazaur brothers are practicing when they and Rick hear an explosion. Thieves have blasted open a mine shaft and find what they think are gems, but they are actually rocks full of life force. Gigano Dragon goes to steal the rocks for the Dragozaurs and Styraco, Toro, and Centro must stop him.
11. Their Name is Dino Weapons
  Kaito, Rena, Naomi, Dr. Abbott, and Professor Takuda travel to a volcanic island filled with life force. There are three mini-Dinozaurs on the island, which are rogue. A man named Gomez catches them to sell as specimens as the Dino Knights realize that these are the Dino Weapons. The Drago Clones then arrive and the Dino Knights must face them if they are to get the weapons.
12. The Legend of Dino Ramph Part 1
  Kaito dreams of seeing a phoenix, and soon finds out that it is a creature known as Dino Ramph. Dino Tyranno knows him, and they and Rena go to Central America to investigate tremors. Gigano Dragon attacks, and Dino Tyranno must fight him while Kaito and Rena find Ramph. Meanwhile, the other knights are fighting the Drago Clones at the South Pole, but Diamond Ryugu herself is coming.
13. The Legend of Dino Ramph Part 2
  The Dino Knights try to hold off the Dragozaurs in the Antarctic. Diamond Ryugu depowers them and starts to suck up all of the Earth's life force. Rick, Rena, and Kaito must awaken Dino Ramph to defeat her.
14. A New Shadow
  Diamond Ryugu wants Dino Ramph's power, but only after the Dino Knights are slain. She summons a powerful Dragozaur named Dark Dragon and sends him to destroy the Dino Knights. Kaito and Rena are trying to find Dino Ramph before Ryugu does, and Rick tells them that a birdlike creature has been sighted, but it is a trap by Dark Dragon.
15. Keep the Faith
  Dino Tyranno and Dino Tricera have been incinerated in the volcano, and the others try to protect their remains. Only Dino Ramph can resurrect them. Kaito, Rick, Rena, and Ptera search for him and find him at Drago Mountain. The group must pass the mountain warriors' test to survive. Dark Dragon is about to confront the remaining Dino Knights, the Cerazaurs and the Dino Weapons. While they hold him off, the kids try to restore Tyranno and Tricera.
16. The Stolen Dino Dagger
  Dark Dragon protests his defeat to Diamond Ryugu that the Dino Daggers were the only reason he was defeated, so he creates a girl named Kira to steal them. Kaito and Rena must get their daggers back or it's all over.
17. Welcome Back Theo
  Kaito, Taki, and Rena are swept away by a whirlpool and end up in an underwater city full of life force. The city inhabitants attack them and confiscate Kaito's Dino Dagger. A girl named Helen rescues them and tells them they are in Atlantis. Diamond Ryugu sends the Drago Clones to the city to get the life force. Kaito and Rena must stop the Drago Clones by reviving Atlantis' guardian, Dino Icthyo.
18. Dino Icthyo in a Pinch
  Dino Arch falls in love with Dino Icthyo. Theo tells the kids that she will be impressed if Arch brings her a ruby from a certain island. While searching for the ruby to give Theo, Kaito, Rena, Arch and the other Dino Weapons have a skirmish with Drago Wing who is trying to improve the Dragozaurs' water-fighting skills.
19. Baby Come Back
  A group of Dragozaurs sneak to Earth to eat life force. Meanwhile, Kaito and Rena babysit his parents' friends' baby, Zach. Tyranno fights the isolated Dragozaurs and Zach is accidentally abducted when they retreat. Drago Wing finds out that the Dragozaurs have brought a human to the base and orders them to eat him, but one Dragozaur grows attached to Zach.
20. Remember Your True Self
  Drago Wing offers to properly motivate the Dragozaurs with a stirring speech in order to please Diamond Ryugu. On Earth, the newly motivated Dragozaurs fight the Dino Knights, but with the same result as always: defeat. During their retreat, Drago Wing is knocked to the ground and loses his memory. When summoned back to Diamond Ryugu, she orders the Dragozaurs to restore his memory by showing him clips of their previous battles with the Dino Knights.
21. The Ninja Castle in the Sky
  The remaining Drago Clones make themselves look like humans and build a ninja castle which they use to trap Rick. Dino Styraco is their target, and Rick must stop the Drago Clones, who are led by Dark Dragon.
22. Supersaurus' Great Strength
  Skeletal remains of a supersaurus are found. Rena and Kaito go with Naomi to look at it. Dark Dragon promises Diamond Ryugu that he will defeat the Dino Knights by taking control of the supersaurus skeleton. The supersaurus drains Dino Tricera, Stego and Mammoth's life force just by touching them. Tyranno must find a way to fight the beast without touching it.
23. Gigano Strikes Back
  A dragon fossil is discovered by Dr. Gale, and Kaito and Rena go to the excavation site to see it uncovered. As soon as they see it, they recognize it as Gigano Dragon and quickly report the discovery to the Dino Knights. As the fossilized form of Gigano is driven away by Dr. Gale, his truck is attacked by Gomez. He steals Gigano's fossil, but it is soon stolen again by Dark Dragon so he can revive Gigano to fight Dino Tyranno.
24. The Demonic Solar Eclipse
  NASA is going to launch a new weather observation satellite immediately after the day's solar eclipse, and Kaito agrees to watch the event with Rena. As the eclipse begins, Kaito is feeling the effects of food poisoning in the Dinotarium and misses it. As everyone else observes the eclipse, they notice a strange glow around the Moon, and Dark Dragon casts a spell to control everyone's mind, telling them to go to the Dinotarium and destroy the Dino Knights. Kaito and the Knights must avoid the mob and defeat Dark Dragon once and for all.
25. Invasion of the Bite Lice
  The Dragozaurs' base begins to crumble without a supply of life force, and Diamond Ryugu sends Drago Wing to Earth to command an army of bite lice to invade and cover it with dark energy. The Dino Knights are disabled, and so Kaito, Rena and Rick venture out to stop the lice, but they and the Dino Knights are unaware that the lice are just to distract them from Diamond Ryugu's true plan.
26. For the Earth
  Diamond Ryugu plans to drain all of Earth's life force with an enormous extractor powered by a captured Dino Ramph. Kaito, Rena and Rick enter the machine to free him while the Dino Knights fight the Dragozaurs in a final battle for the fate of the Earth.

== Production ==
Dinozone was created by Bandai in cooperation with anime studio Sunrise. The toys were presented as clear dinosaurlike robots that can change form into a robot mode called Progress Mode, with the main gimmick of the toys having clear colored plastic alongside die cast metal parts, to represent a reconstructed fossilized dinosaur. Each toy has an individual weapon as its accessory, though certain toys in the toyline can act as weapons to be equipped such as Dino Pachy or Dino Arch.

The OVA series was released by Sunrise as a pack-in to the toys. Four episodes were released as the fifth and final episode was an exclusive for Televi Magazine and Comic BomBom subscribers. In 2000, Bandai partnered with Saban Entertainment to bring the series to America, changing the name to Dinozaurs, and Sunrise produced an animated series to promote the toys alongside new character designs that were not present in the original Dinozone toyline.

== Media ==
=== OVA ===
The original toyline spawned a five-episode OVA series, the first four which were released on VHS alongside the initial release of the toys, while the final fifth OVA was given only to subscribers of Televi Magazine and Comic BomBom. It was directed and written by Tetsurō Amino.

=== Anime ===
An anime series based on the American version of the toyline, titled Dinozaurs: The Series, was produced by Sunrise, OLM Digital and Saban Entertainment. It aired on North America in both Fox Kids in the US and YTV in Canada from July 28 to November 30, 2000. It was directed by Kiyoshi Fukumoto and written by Yasuko Kobayashi while the music was composed by Shirō Hamaguchi, Akifumi Tada, Ron Kenan, Shuki Levy, and Kusa March. In the edited English dub by Saban Entertainment, all the musical score and sound effects are completely replaced with brand new American made ones.

The rights to the English-dubbed version of Dinozaurs: The Series were formerly licensed by Saban Entertainment in North America in 2000, and are now owned by Disney Enterprises after Disney bought Fox Family/Fox Kids Worldwide in 2001, but there were no plans to release the English-dubbed version of Dinozaurs on Region 1 DVD.
