= Stitch & Ai =

2017 Chinese animated series spin-off in the Lilo & Stitch franchise

- English logo
- Chinese: 安玲与史迪奇
- Literal meaning: An Ling and Stitch
- Hanyu Pinyin: Ān líng yǔ shǐ dí qí
- Genre: Action; Animation; Science fantasy; Comedy
- Based on: Lilo & Stitch characters by Chris Sanders; Dean DeBlois
- Written by: Marc Handler
- Directed by: Tony Craig; Marc Handler (voices)
- Voices of: Ben Diskin; Erica Mendez; Jess Winfield; Lucien Dodge; Laura Post; Cherami Leigh; Xanthe Huynh; Richard Epcar
- Composer: Stephen James Taylor
- Country of origin: China
- Original languages: English (original production); Mandarin Chinese (dubbed; first released version)
- No. of seasons: 1
- No. of episodes: 13

Production
- Executive producers: Wang Gang; Pei Duo; Tian Tian; Tony Craig; Marc Handler
- Producers: Cao Jie; Wu Wensheng
- Running time: 22 minutes
- Production companies: Anhui Xinhua Media; Panimation Hwakai Media; Disney Television International China

Original release
- Network: CCTV-1; CCTV-14
- Release: March 27 – April 6, 2017

Related
- Lilo & Stitch: The Series (2003–2006); Stitch! (2008–2011, 2012, 2015)

Stitch & Ai (Chinese: 安玲与史迪奇; pinyin: Ān líng yǔ shǐ dí qí; lit. 'An Ling and Stitch') is an English-language-produced donghua television series. It is a spin-off of Disney's Lilo & Stitch franchise, serving as its third TV series, after the Western animated Lilo & Stitch: The Series and the Japanese Stitch! anime series. It was produced with the assistance of American animators. Set in Huangshan, Anhui, the thirteen-episode series features a Chinese girl named Wang Ai Ling in place of the original 2002–2006 Western continuity's Lilo Pelekai and the anime's Yuna Kamihara as the titular human companion of the alien Stitch.

The series first aired in China with a Mandarin Chinese dub from March 27 to April 6, 2017. The original English-language version first aired from February 5 to 27, 2018, in Southeast Asia on that region's Disney Channel. Twelve episodes of the series were available for free digital streaming in the United States via DisneyNow from December 1, 2018, to around June 2019.

== Plot ==
Stitch & Ai follows the events of Lilo & Stitch and its subsequent film and television sequels up to and including Leroy & Stitch, set around 2016. (Note: According to a calendar seen in the episode "Dragon Parade", that episode takes place from February 3 to 8, 2016. The episode, focused on the Chinese New Year, shows the calendar having a leap day (February 29) and February 8 circled as the date of the Chinese New Year; 2016, a leap year, was the most recent year at the time of the series' debut to have its Chinese New Year be on February 8.) The series opens with Stitch being kidnapped by a reptilian faction of alien criminals known as the Jaboodies, who want to use him as a weapon to win a space war against their platypus-like enemies, the Woolagongs, who also want Stitch for the same purposes. Prior to the series' events, the Jaboodies pursued Stitch after hacking into the Galactic Federation's database and discovering a previously-unrevealed "metamorphosis program" that was secretly coded into him. This function causes the experiment to grow into a giant beast with four laser-firing tentacles when his destructive programming is triggered in a large city. However, the Woolagongs manage to steal the data from the Jaboodies, board the rivaling battle cruiser, and attempt to kidnap Stitch for themselves. Stitch is accidentally freed in the fighting, allowing him to escape back to Earth, where he ends up in China's Huangshan mountains.

In Huangshan, Stitch meets Wang Ai Ling, a spirited local girl who is soon to be separated from her older sister Jiejie by their aunt Daiyu after the sisters lost their parents in the past year. Daiyu desires to move Ai out of the mountains and into the city with her, believing that it would help Ai would become a "proper lady", but Ai loves her home and is resistant to the idea. Stitch quickly befriends Ai, becomes her new "dog", and the two help one another solve their problems; Ai helps Stitch fight off the Jaboodies and Woolagongs, as well as help him look for a shrine that he has been seeing in a mysterious vision. In return, Stitch helps Ai stay in the mountains with Jiejie and ward off Daiyu's attempts to take her away. Stitch's creator Jumba and his friend Pleakley later arrive in Huangshan, as they are ordered to bring Stitch to the Galactic Federation for security purposes, but Ai and Jiejie convince the two aliens to let Stitch stay with them. Jumba and Pleakley are then given permission to stay on Earth to keep watch over Stitch as they help out his newfound family.

The series also features various flashbacks to key scenes in the franchise that appear in "Hello – Goodbye", "Teacher's Pet", and "Monstrosity". The flashbacks consist of closely re-animated sequences, copying the originals to the best of their ability. The flashback scenes are based on scenes from the original Lilo & Stitch, Lilo & Stitch 2: Stitch Has a Glitch, and The Origin of Stitch. In co-ordinance with this, there are occasional appearances from previous characters of the Lilo & Stitch franchise, including Captain Gantu, the Grand Councilwoman, Cobra Bubbles, the Ice Cream Man, and (in a brief cameo) Dr. Hämsterviel.

== Characters ==
A promotional poster for Stitch & Ai featuring the show's main characters. From left to right: Dahu, Jiejie, Jumba, Pleakley, Ai, and Stitch.

- Stitch (史迪奇; Shǐ dí qí) – An alien genetic experiment also known as Experiment 626. He was kidnapped by space criminals who want to use him so they can have their own evil genetic experiment, but he manages to escape back to Earth, ending up in China. He befriends a local girl named Ai, who takes him into her family. He is voiced in English by Ben Diskin, who also voiced the character in the Stitch! anime, and in Mandarin by Li Zhengxiang.
- Wang Ai Ling (王安玲; Wáng Ān líng) – A Chinese girl who lives in the Huangshan mountains. Her aunt wants to move her to the city, but she wants to stay in the mountains. Ai befriends Stitch, taking him in as her "dog", and helps him ward off the warring alien factions that want him. She serves as this series's counterpart to Lilo Pelekai. She is voiced in English by Erica Mendez, who tweeted that she is a fan of Stitch and getting to voice his companion in a series was "a dream come true" for her. In Mandarin, the character is voiced by Jiang Sunwei.
- Wang Jiejie (王婕婕; Wáng jié jié) – A young Chinese woman who tries to take care of her younger sister Ai after their parents' deaths. She works at a tea shop for a man named Mr. Ding. She serves as this series's counterpart to Nani Pelekai. She is voiced in English by Laura Post and in Mandarin by Li Yan.
- Qian Dahu (钱大胡; Qián dà hú) – Jiejie's boyfriend and Ai's drum instructor. He serves as this series's counterpart to David Kawena, with an element of Moses Puloki with regards to his teachings of a local tradition. He is voiced in English by Lucien Dodge.
- Jumba Jookiba (强霸卓奇霸) – The Kweltikwan creator of Stitch. He is sent by the Grand Councilwoman to retrieve Stitch from the space criminals that captured him. However, after reuniting with Stitch in China and meeting his new family, Jumba decides to let Stitch stay with Ai, sticking around himself to assist and watch over him. The show also reveals that he is the galaxy's leading expert on metamorphosis. He is voiced in English by Jess Winfield, who previously served as screenwriter and executive producer for Lilo & Stitch: The Series and its films Stitch! The Movie and Leroy & Stitch, and voiced the same character in the Stitch! anime. In Mandarin, the character is voiced by Cheng Yuzhu.
- Wendy Pleakley (温帝独眼霹雳) – A Plorgonarian former United Galactic Federation agent and Jumba's partner. He is also sent by the Grand Councilwoman to retrieve Stitch alongside Jumba. After Jumba decides to let Stitch stay with Ai, Pleakley also stays with Stitch's new family and tries to help out. He is voiced in English by Lucien Dodge and in Mandarin by Hu Qian.
- Daiyu (姨妈) – Ai and Jiejie's mysophobic aunt who believes that Ai should not be living in the "dirty" mountains and move to the city, despite her nieces' protests. She is voiced in English by Laura Post and in Mandarin by Yan Lixuan.
- Meiying (美英; Měiyīng) – Ai's rival who serves as this series's counterpart to Mertle Edmonds. She is voiced in English by Cherami Leigh and Xanthe Huynh.
- Sage – A wise but mysterious sage who observes Stitch and Ai's journey, appearing to them at times. He hands ancient scrolls to Jumba so the Kweltikwan can use them to make ancient Chinese creatures. He is voiced in English by Lucien Dodge.
- The Jaboodies – A race of reptilian-like alien creatures who are at war with the Woolagongs. They desire to use Experiment 626 (Stitch) and his metamorphosis program to make him fight for them to win their space war. They were the ones to have captured Stitch prior to the events the show. Their leader, Commander Wombat, is voiced in English by Richard Epcar.
- The Woolagongs – A race of platypus-like alien creatures who are at war with the Jaboodies. They also desire to use Stitch to make him fight for them to win their space war. They accidentally freed Stitch at the beginning of the series when they attack the Jaboodies' battle cruiser spaceship. Their leader, credited as "Platypus", is voiced in English by Lucien Dodge.
- Mr. Ding – Jiejie's employer who runs a tea shop and likes to juggle tea kettles. He is voiced in English by Richard Epcar.
- Dim Long – An orange dragon-like experiment Jumba makes as a beta test for future experiments. He has the ability to fly without wings using the power of qi. Introduced in "The Lock", he acts as a pet to the aliens.
- Captain Gantu – The leader of the United Galactic Federation's Galactic Armada and a member of its Galactic Council. Unlike the previous two TV shows, Gantu is not employed by Dr. Hämsterviel (who only makes a brief cameo appearance) and maintains his original employment from the first film, which also removes him as a main character as he doesn't involve himself with Stitch unlike before. He is voiced in English by Richard Epcar, who is not credited for the role.
- The Grand Councilwoman – The leader of the United Galactic Federation and its council. Recognizing the threat imposed by the Woolagongs and the Jaboodies with their space war and separate desires to acquire Stitch to use him, she initially sends Jumba and Pleakley to Earth to retrieve Stitch. However, after the two aliens show that separating Stitch and his new friend Ai would not be good for either of them, she assigns Jumba and Pleakley to stay and look after Stitch. She is voiced in English by Laura Post, who is not credited for the role.
- Cobra Bubbles – A CIA agent who has dealt with Stitch in the past. He's in China to secretly observe Stitch and relay information to the Grand Councilwoman. He is voiced in English by Richard Epcar, who is not credited for the role.

Kyle Hebert, Bobby Thong, Sarah Anne Williams, Deborah Crane, Jacob Craner, and Steve Kramer provide additional voices. Among Craner's voice roles is a Jaboodie agent appearing in the final two episodes who disguises himself as a human to be Ai's new "brother" named "Yong".

== Episodes ==
No.	Title	Directed by	Written by	Original air date (Mandarin Chinese dub)	English air date (Southeast Asia)
1	"Hello – Goodbye" (Note: The first episode's English title is likely meant to be read as "Hello Minus Goodbye" based on the episode's ending, where Ai writes "再见" (Zàijiàn; "Goodbye") on dirt as a means to tell Stitch that Daiyu will be forcing her to leave her home, only for Stitch to scratch it out and write "你好" (Nǐ hǎo; "Hello"), in response to tell her that they'll find a way to stay.); Chinese title: "你好黄山" ("Hello Huangshan")	Tony Craig; Marc Handler (voices)	Marc Handler	March 27, 2017	February 5, 2018
Stitch is held captive on a spaceship above Earth by an alien faction called the Jaboodies, who want to use him against his own will to win a space war against their enemies, the Woolagongs, who themselves attack the ship wanting Stitch for themselves. Stitch gets freed him in the process during the fight and escapes back to Earth, landing in China's Huangshan mountains where he meets orphaned Chinese girl Wang Ai Ling. Her aunt Daiyu will be forcibly moving Ai out of the girl's mountain home and separated from her older sister Jiejie to live in a city. The two quickly bond as the girl shows the blue alien around the mountains. Stitch desires to find a shrine he's been seeing in visions he had, but once Ai takes him to a shrine that does not match the one in his visions, they soon find themselves pursued by both alien factions. Ultimately, Stitch and Ai lead them on a goose chase around the mountains, causing a number of both factions' soldiers to be knocked out and forcing them to teleport away to regroup. When Stitch and Ai arrive at the latter's house, Ai is reminded about the impending move. Stitch then tells Ai that the two of them will find a way to get her to stay in the mountains where she belongs.
2	"Teacher's Pet"; Chinese title: "家是最重要的" (lit. "Home is the Most Important Thing")	Tony Craig; Marc Handler (voices)	Marc Handler	March 28, 2017	February 6, 2018
Ai, who's happy to now have Stitch in her life, is ready to show her science class a strobe light she made. However, she and Stitch, who snuck into her school, find that her teacher has been possessed and mutated by a Woolagong sent to capture Stitch, leading to Stitch and Ai fighting the possessed teacher in the classroom. Meanwhile, at Mr. Ding's tea shop, Jiejie tries to convince Daiyu to not move Ai to the city, deciding to bring her to Ai's school to show that Ai is getting a good education there.
3	"Gotcha!"; Chinese title: "外星访客" ("Alien Visitors")	Tony Craig; Marc Handler (voices)	Marc Handler	March 28, 2017	February 7, 2018
After Jiejie and Dahu head out, Stitch and Ai find they are being spied on by the Jaboodies' "spybots". Meanwhile, Jumba and Pleakley are ordered by the Grand Councilwoman—who knows about the "metamorphosis program" Jumba programmed in Stitch—to go to Earth and bring Stitch back before either the Jaboodies or the Woolagongs get him first. Once they arrive, however, they find that Stitch isn't willing to be taken away by anyone, even his old family.
4	"The Scroll"; Chinese title: "神奇的竹简" (lit. "Magical Bamboo Slips")	Tony Craig; Marc Handler (voices)	Marc Handler	March 29, 2017	February 8, 2018
Jumba and Pleakley come to Earth to get Stitch, who flees with Ai to an old shrine with a strange sage there. The sage helps Stitch and Ai flee from the aliens and sidetracks Jumba with ancient scrolls that detail monsters, which peaks the scientist's "evil genius" curiosity, leading him to create a qilin. Shortly after Stitch and Ai return home, the Jaboodies' drones arrive to capture Stitch, but he's saved by Jumba's qilin, who destroys the drones. However, Jumba then finally captures Stitch afterward, which upsets Ai to the point of having a breakdown. After Jiejie passionately argues for Jumba and Pleakley to let Ai keep Stitch, the alien partners free him and explain to the Grand Councilwoman via video chat what happened. She permits Jumba and Pleakley to let Stitch live with Ai, under the condition that they are responsible for safeguarding him.
5	"Spirals"; Chinese title: "爱的力量" ("The Power of Love")	Tony Craig; Marc Handler (voices)	Marc Handler	March 29, 2017	February 12, 2018
Jumba creates a dragon, which disobeys him. He then realizes the dragon needs a mate or it will turn evil for 100 years. He succeeds in making a mate for the dragon, who then produce an egg. After Stitch, Ai, Jumba, and Pleakley spend the night with the dragons, Stitch finds himself targeted by the Woolagongs, who inadvertently threaten the dragon egg. Stitch, Ai, and the dragons fight the Woolagongs to protect the egg before it hatches.
6	"The Lock"; Chinese title: "同心锁" (lit. "Concentric Lock")	Tony Craig; Marc Handler (voices)	Marc Handler	March 30, 2017	February 13, 2018
Ai explains in the cold open that Stitch was protected by "special qi energy" during his re-entry into Earth's atmosphere in the first episode; the same energy was also responsible for him losing much of his memories of his life before Ai, including Lilo. He knew that he had to find a secret shrine but does not know where it was or why he had to find it. In the episode proper, Ai takes Stitch to a bridge where several locks are. Friends write their names on the locks and lock them on the bridge as a symbol of their unbreakable friendship. Unfortunately, Stitch does not agree with where to place the lock, resulting in them fighting over it and dropping the lock below the bridge. They then get attacked by both Woolagongs and Jaboodies going after Stitch once again, and Pleakley ends up getting caught up in the fight when he tries to rescue the duo. Jumba sends out his latest experiment, a xiezhi, to save Stitch, Ai, and Pleakley. After the two alien factions are defeated again, Stitch finds the lock, and he and Ai finally agree on a spot to lock it.
7	"Dragon Parade"; Chinese title: "舞龙庆典" (lit. "Dragon Dance Celebration")	Tony Craig; Marc Handler (voices)	Marc Handler	March 30, 2017	February 14, 2018
Dahu is assigned to lead the town's annual Chinese New Year dragon parade. A dragon puppet for the parade is ruined by accident when Meiying and her friends accidentally burn it while taking smartphone photos, so Ai has Jumba substitute the puppet by having Dim Long temporarily enlarged to take its place. Meanwhile, Stitch tricks the Jaboodies and the Woolagongs to invade Earth at the same time to get him, causing them to fight and severely damage each other at the end.
8	"Tell the World" ("告诉世界")	Tony Craig; Marc Handler (voices)	Marc Handler	March 31, 2017	February 15, 2018
Ai and her classmates are motivated to produce and share videos for an online event called Tell the World. Meanwhile, Jumba creates a nian who captures children around town. When Stitch and Ai find out that the nian likes watching videos, they pretend to be a director and producer who are going to make him a movie star so they could trick him into leading them to where he captured the children.
9	"The Phoenix"; Chinese title: "凤凰" ("Fenghuang" or "Phoenix")	Tony Craig; Marc Handler (voices)	Marc Handler	March 31, 2017	February 20, 2018
Daiyu brings Ai's cousin Bao to try to convince Ai to move to the city. Jumba creates a fenghuang that quickly grows and flies off to find a ruined shrine, so Ai, Stitch, and Bao head after it. However, two alien bounty hunters named Noo-bing and Zi try to capture the fenghuang to try to sell it to collectors. (Note: This episode was not released in the United States.)
10	"Dream On"; Chinese title: "梦境" ("Dreamland")	Tony Craig; Marc Handler (voices)	Marc Handler	April 5, 2017	February 21, 2018
The Woolagongs send an agent down to knock out and capture Stitch. His dream beam gun instead zaps Ai, bringing her imaginary friend, Cheng Fei, to life. Cheng Fei takes her to a mythical land in the mountains called the Valley of Dreams, which brings Ai's dreams, good and bad, to life, including a dream of Stitch growing into a monster. Meanwhile, Jumba creates a mo, and Stitch captures the agent that zapped Ai. After Jeijei contacts Jumba saying that Ai was absent from school, the aliens set out to find the little girl.
11	"Nuo Opera" ("傩戏"); DisneyNow title: "Creatures"	Tony Craig; Marc Handler (voices)	Marc Handler	April 5, 2017	February 22, 2018
Stitch decides to be naughty and mass-produce mythical creatures Jumba has been working on. The end result is ruining the nuo opera the town was planning to put on. Cobra Bubbles radios the Galactic Alliance, ready to apprehend Stitch. However, after witnessing Stitch remedy his mistake and gets the creatures to behave and successfully help put on the nuo opera, he calls off the attack.
12	"Brothers" ("兄弟")	Tony Craig; Marc Handler (voices)	Marc Handler	April 6, 2017	February 26, 2018
In this first half of the two-part series finale, Pleakley receives a strange alien device with various functions called a "Tetra-Tab". Ai and Stitch use the device to give themselves "brothers" named "Yong" and "Scratch". They all get along until Scratch starts convincing Stitch to destroy things, getting him to destroy a model city and then a construction site, with Ai, Jumba, and Pleakley finding out about the latter on the local news. After Stitch destroys the construction site, Scratch leads him to a city under construction and convinces him to start destroying it, finally getting Stitch to activate his metamorphosis program and grow into a giant monstrosity. Ai and Yong arrive on Jumba's hovercraft to see the giant Stitch beginning to approach the city.
13	"Monstrosity"; Chinese title: "我有家了" ("I Have a Home")	Tony Craig; Marc Handler (voices)	Marc Handler	April 6, 2017	February 27, 2018
Ai learns that Yong and Scratch are actually disguised Jaboodies that have activated the metamorphosis program in him. The now-giant Stitch attacks the city, unwittingly on behalf of the Jaboodies, growing bigger and more powerful the more he destroys. The Jaboodies, including their leader Commander Wombat, then reveal themselves to him and capture Ai. Despite Wombat and Scratch's attempts to convince Stitch serve the Jaboodies to win their space war against the Woolagongs, Ai is able to get through to the real, good-hearted Stitch. Stitch turns on the Jaboodies and uses his new form to destroy their weaponry and rescue Ai, and then he shrinks back down to his normal size and form. Jumba and Pleakley arrive to help, with the former summoning his recreated Chinese creatures from his pocket dimension, and the heroes drive the Jaboodies away. After returning home, Stitch is disappointed to still not have found the shrine from his visions but is nonetheless grateful to have a family.

== Production ==
Stitch & Ai is produced by Anhui Xinhua Media and Panimation Hwakai Media in association with Disney with additional work by Showfun Animation, Shanghai Fire & Ice Media, and Shanghai Aoju Media. The series began broadcast on CCTV-14 on March 27, 2017. Unlike Stitch!, this series was produced in co-operation with American Disney animators—including those who worked on Lilo & Stitch: The Series—to maintain a sense of visual continuity to the original American-produced films and TV series. Such artists included Greg Guler, the character designer of Gargoyles and a lead character designer on Lilo & Stitch: The Series. The series was produced as part of an effort by Disney to enter the Chinese animation market. It was originally produced in English then dubbed into Mandarin Chinese.

Tony Craig, an executive producer of Lilo & Stitch: The Series who directed Stitch! The Movie, Leroy & Stitch, and the season two episodes "Spike" and "Shoe", served as director for Stitch & Ai. Victor Cook, who was a director for both seasons of Lilo & Stitch: The Series, was initially signed onto the Chinese series and even visited China to assist making the eighth episode. At first, Cook contacted Craig to storyboard the first episode, but when Cook had to drop out due to other commitments, he had Craig take over directing. Craig joined during pre-production, and had to delay joining in full due to a prior employment issue, although Panimation waited for him. Craig oversaw the storyboards, animatics, animation, most of the designs, and all the editing sessions, but he was not involved with the dialogue recordings, which happened in Los Angeles while Craig lives in North Carolina.

The show made its English premiere on Disney Channel Asia on February 5, 2018. The series (except for the ninth episode "The Phoenix") later became available in the United States for free streaming on DisneyNow on December 1, 2018. It was later removed from the service in June 2019.
