= Transformers: Robots in Disguise (2000 TV series) =

2000-originated Transformers TV series

- Transformers: Car Robots; Transformers: Robots in Disguise
- United Kingdom ultimate collection DVD cover with one side showing Optimus Prime's head and the other side showing Megatron's head.

トランスフォーマー カーロボット (Toransufōmā: Kā Robotto)
- Genre: Action, science fiction
- Anime television series
- Directed by: Osamu Sekita
- Produced by: Hisashi Katou; Juuroh Sugimura; Makiko Iwata; Shigero Sugimura
- Written by: Junki Takegami
- Studio: Studio Gallop; Nihon Ad Systems
- Licensed by: NA: Saban Entertainment (2001–2002) The Walt Disney Company (2002–present)
- Original network: TV Tokyo (2000)
- English network: CA: YTV; IN: Cartoon Network; UK: Fox Kids; US: Fox Kids (2001–2002)
- Original run: April 5, 2000 – December 27, 2000
- Episodes: 39

Transformers: Car Robots (トランスフォーマー カーロボット, Toransufōmā Kā Robotto), localized into American English as Transformers: Robots in Disguise is a Japanese anime television series part of the Transformers franchise. The series was produced by Nihon Ad Systems and Studio Gallop, in cooperation with Korean company Dongwoo Animation, aired in Japan in 2000.

In Japan the series is set in continuity with prior series, while the localization functions as a reboot to the franchise, with a self-contained continuity separate from any previous incarnation, many characters having their names changed, some treated as new iterations of classic Transformers characters, the localized English adaptation aired as part of the Fox Kids programming block in the United States from September 8, 2001, to March 30, 2002.

== Plot ==
While attempting to stop the Predacons from stealing Earth's energy, the Autobots ally themselves with Koji Onishi after Predacon leader Megatron makes himself known to the public and captures the boy's father Dr. Kenneth Onishi. Amidst their battles, the Autobots and Predacons discover the location of a crashed spaceship from their home planet Cybertron containing six Autobot protoforms. Megatron reaches it first and reprograms the protoforms into the evil Decepticons. In light of this, Predacon sub-commander Sky-Byte attempts to prove his worth to Megatron by stealing the Autobots' O-Parts. Meanwhile, Ultra Magnus, the bitter brother of Autobot leader Optimus Prime, arrives on Earth to claim the latter's Matrix for his own, only for the brothers to gain the ability to merge into Omega Prime.

The Autobots and Predacons eventually discover Fortress Maximus, a giant Transformer hidden on Earth to protect it. While they race to claim its power, Sky-Byte accidentally frees Dr. Onishi, who joins the Autobots to help them locate all of the O-Parts necessary to find the Orb of Sigma. While Megatron finds it and uses its power to become Galvatron, the Orb leads the Autobots to Cerebros, Fortress Maximus' power key. A final battle soon ensues between Galvatron and Omega Prime, who eventually prevails and brings Galvatron, the Decepticons, and most of the Predacons back to Cybertron to face justice while Sky-Byte stealthily escapes into Earth's oceans.

== Episodes ==
The three clip shows of Robots in Disguise differ between the English and Japanese versions. Both are listed at the appropriate numbers.

No.	Title	Japanese title	Directed by	Written by	Original release date	English release date
1	""Battle Protocol!""	初出動! ファイヤーコンボイ; First Deployment! Fire Convoy	Junki Takegami (JP); Tom Wyner (US)	Yoshiaki Tsutsui, Akira Katō	September 8, 2001	April 5, 2000
Predacons have come! The Autobots must defeat a gigantic hand!
2	""An Explosive Situation""	高速バトル! ゲルシャーク; High-Speed Battle! Gelshark	Junki Takegami (JP); Tom Wyner (US)	Yoshiaki Tsutsui, Akira Katō	September 10, 2001	April 12, 2000
3	""Bullet Train to the Rescue""	合体せよ! 新幹線ロボ; Combine! Bullet Train Robo	Yukiyoshi Ōhashi (JP); Steve Kramer (US)	Akira Katō	September 12, 2001	April 19, 2000
4	""Spychangers to the Rescue""	忍者ロボ! スパイチェンジャー参上; Ninja Robo! The Spychangers Enter	Kazuhiko Gōdo (JP); Richard Epcar (US)	Yoshiaki Tsutsui	September 13, 2001	April 26, 2000
5	""The Hunt for Black Pyramid""	決死のジャンプ! マッハアラート; Resolute Jump! Mach Alert	Tadashi Hayakawa (JP); Marc Handler (US)	Akira Katō	September 14, 2001	May 3, 2000
6	""The Secret of the Ruins""	ギガトロンの襲撃! Gigatron's Raid!	Junki Takegami (JP); Tom Wyner (US)	Yoshiaki Tsutsui	October 11, 2001	May 10, 2000
7	""Sideburn's Obsession""	スピードブレイカーの危機! Speedbreaker's Crisis!	Yukiyoshi Ōhashi (JP); Richard Epcar (US)	Akira Katō	September 15, 2001	May 17, 2000
8	""Secret Weapon: D-5""	謎の兵器! D5; Mysterious Weapon! D5	Kazuhiko Gōdo (JP); Marc Handler (US)	Yoshiaki Tsutsui	September 17, 2001	May 24, 2000
9	""Mirage's Betrayal""	カウンターアローの裏切り!? Counterarrow's Betrayal!?	Tadashi Hayakawa (JP); Richard Epcar (US)	Akira Katō	September 18, 2001	May 31, 2000
10	""Skid Z's Choice""	爆走! インディーヒート!! Out of Control! Indy Heat!!	Junki Takegami (JP); Tom Wyner (US)	Yoshiaki Tsutsui	September 19, 2001	June 7, 2000
11	""Tow-Line Goes Haywire""	駐車違反だ! レッカーフック; Parking Violation! Wrecker Hook	Yukiyoshi Ōhashi (JP); Matthew V. Lewis (US)	Akira Katō	September 20, 2001	June 14, 2000
12	""The Ultimate Robot Warrior""	究極! 大仏トランスフォーマー; The Ultimate Extreme! The Large Buddha Statue Transformer	Kazuhiko Gōdo (JP); Richard Epcar (US)	Yoshiaki Tsutsui	September 21, 2001	June 21, 2000
13	""Hope for the Future""	ギガトロンの野望を暴け! Gigatron's Ambitions Revealed!	Junki Takegami (JP); Tom Wyner (US)	Osamu Sekita	October 26, 2001	June 28, 2000
14	""The Decepticons""	敵? 味方!? ブラックコンボイ; Friend? Foe!? Black Convoy	Junki Takegami (JP); Tom Wyner (US)	Akira Katō	September 22, 2001	July 5, 2000
15	""Commandos""	5体合体! バルディガス; 5-Body Combination! Baldigus	Yukiyoshi Ōhashi (JP); Marc Handler (US)	Yoshiaki Tsutsui	September 24, 2001	July 12, 2000
16	""Volcano""	対決! ふたりのコンボイ! En Garde! Two Convoys!	Tadashi Hayakawa (JP); Tom Wyner (US)	Akira Katō	September 25, 2001	July 19, 2000
17	""Attack from Outer Space""	宇宙から狙え! シャトラー!! Aiming from Space! Shuttler!!	Kazuhiko Gōdo (JP); Matthew V. Lewis (US)	Yoshiaki Tsutsui	January 12, 2002	July 26, 2000
18	""The Test""	正義に目覚めよ! ブラックコンボイ; Awaken to Righteousness! Black Convoy	Junki Takegami (JP); Tom Wyner (US)	Akira Katō	September 26, 2001	August 2, 2000
19	""The Fish Test""	秘密作戦! ゲルシャーク; Secret Strategy! Gelshark	Yukiyoshi Ōhashi (JP); Marc Handler (US)	Yoshiaki Tsutsui	September 27, 2001	August 9, 2000
20	""Wedge's Short Fuse""	熱血戦士! ビルドマスター; Hot-Blooded Warriors! Buildmasters	Junki Takegami (JP); Richard Epcar (US)	Akira Katō	September 28, 2001	August 16, 2000
21	""Landfill""	四体合体! ビルドキング; Four-Body Combination! Build King	Yukiyoshi Ōhashi (JP); Richard Epcar (US)	Yoshiaki Tsutsui	June 22, 2002	August 23, 2000
22	""Sky-Byte Saves the Day""	正義の味方? ゲルシャーク; Friend of Righteousness? Gelshark	Tadashi Hayakawa (JP); Matthew V. Lewis (US)	Akira Katō	June 23, 2002	August 30, 2000
23	""A Test of Metal""	狙われたビルドマスター; Targeted Buildmasters	Kazuhiko Gōdo (JP); Richard Epcar (US)	Yoshiaki Tsutsui	September 29, 2001	September 6, 2000
24	""Ultra Magnus""	登場! ゴッドマグナス; Enter! God Magnus	Junki Takegami (JP); Tom Wyner (US)	Akira Katō	October 6, 2001	September 13, 2000
25	""Ultra Magnus: Forced Fusion!""	強制合体! ゴッドファイヤーコンボイ; Forced Combination! God Fire Convoy	Junki Takegami (JP); Matthew V. Lewis (US)	Yoshiaki Tsutsui	October 13, 2001	September 20, 2000
26	""Lessons of the Past""	集結せよ! 新戦士たち; Assemble! New Warriors	Junki Takegami (JP); Tom Wyner (US)	Osamu Sekita	December 14, 2001	September 27, 2000
27	""The Two Faces of Ultra Magnus""	絶体絶命! カーロボ3兄弟; Stalemate! 3 Car Robo Brothers	Yukiyoshi Ōhashi (JP); Michael McConnohie (US)	Akira Katō	October 20, 2001	October 4, 2000
28	""Power to Burn!""	発動! ダブルマトリクス; Invoke! Double Matrix	Tadashi Hayakawa (JP); Tom Wyner (US)	Yoshiaki Tsutsui	October 19, 2001	October 11, 2000
29	""Fortress Maximus""	浮上! サイバトロンシティ; Arise! Cybertron City	Kazuhiko Gōdo (JP); Richard Epcar (US)	Akira Katō	October 27, 2001	October 18, 2000
30	""Koji Gets His Wish""	JRX 対 バルディガス; JRX versus Baldigus	Junki Takegami (JP); Richard Epcar (US)	Yoshiaki Tsutsui	November 3, 2001	October 25, 2000
With Fortress Maximus discovered, the Autobots move to ensure the Predacons and Decepticons don't acquire it before looking for Cerebros, the Headmaster of the huge Autobot. At the same time, Sky-Byte may just ensure that Koji gets a great gift for Dr. Onishi's birthday without even knowing it.
31	""A Friendly Contest""	ゲルシャークの罠; Gelshark's Trap	Yukiyoshi Ōhashi (JP); Matthew V. Lewis (US)	Akira Katō	November 10, 2001	November 1, 2000
32	""Peril from the Past""	最後の鍵? さよならアイ; The Final Key? Farewell, Ai	Tadashi Hayakawa (JP); Michael McConnohie (US)	Yoshiaki Tsutsui	November 17, 2001	November 8, 2000
With the O-Parts in their possession, the Autobots head to the Sahara Desert to locate the Orb of Sigma, but Megatron decides to personally get involved, and Koji may prove to be of vital aid to the Autobots to ensure they don't lose T-AI to the combined O-Parts/Orb of Sigma, while the Decepticons begin to show signs of treason against Megatron.
33	""Maximus Emerges""	奪われたプラズマ; Stolen Plasma	Kazuhiko Gōdo (JP); Tom Wyner (US)	Akira Katō	February 16, 2002	November 15, 2000
Despite the Autobots having acquired the O-Parts and Orb of Sigma to lead them to Cerebros, Scourge and the Decepticons get to the Headmaster of Fortress Maximus first, but it is clear no one understands how Cerebros and Fortress Maximus work once combined and its power is unleashed.
34	""The Human Element""	ブレイブマキシマスの謎; The Mystery of Brave Maximus	Junki Takegami (JP); Tom Wyner (US)	Yoshiaki Tsutsui	February 23, 2002	November 22, 2000
Realizing that when he was created, he inherited Kelly's human bio-signatures into his format, Scourge prepares to use Fortress Maximus himself now that he realized that Cerebros functions via human control.
35	""The Mystery of Ultra Magnus" (Note: This episode is English-titled in an unresolved error as "Mstery of the Ultra Magnus")"	ゲルシャークの憂鬱; Gelshark's Blues	Junki Takegami (JP); Tom Wyner (US)	Osamu Sekita	March 30, 2002	November 29, 2000
36	""Mistaken Identity""	ブラックコンボイの野望; Black Convoy's Ambition	Yukiyoshi Ōhashi (JP); Michael McConnohie (US)	Akira Katō	March 2, 2002	December 6, 2000
An attempt by Scourge to finally usurp Galvatron as leader results in Koji's friend Carl becoming the pilot to Fortress Maximus, but while things don't work out as Scourge hoped, it only gets worse when Cerebros finally lands safely in the hands of the Autobots.
37	""Surprise Attack!""	ブレイブマキシマスの起動! Brave Maximus's Rise!	Tadashi Hayakawa (JP); Tom Wyner (US)	Yoshiaki Tsutsui	March 9, 2002	December 13, 2000
With Cerebros now safely in the Autobots' possession, Galvatron puts the Decepticons firmly back under his control and places them under Sky-Byte's command to hunt down Koji, resulting in them finding and attacking the Autobot HQ, but Optimus is ready and lures the Predacons and Decepticons to where the final battle to determine Earth's fate begins as Galvatron calls in the Megastar to face off with Fortress Maximus when Wedge's courage enables Cerebros to bring the giant Transformer into the fight to protect the planet.
38	""Galvatron's Revenge""	逆襲! デビルギガトロン! Counterattack! Devil Gigatron!	Junki Takegami (JP); Richard Epcar (US)	Akira Katō	March 16, 2002	December 20, 2000
Despite losing his ship, Galvatron is far from finished as he prepares to use the planet's children as leverage to get the Autobots to back off, and possibly be destroyed, leaving Earth ripe for the picking.
39	""The Final Battle""	最後の戦い! ファイヤーコンボイ; Final Battle! Fire Convoy	Junki Takegami (JP); Tom Wyner (US)	Yoshiaki Tsutsui	March 23, 2002	December 27, 2000
As Galvatron and Omega Prime have their final confrontation in the Earth's core, Koji works to get the children of Earth to provide Fortress Maximus the energy needed to aid Omega Prime in defeating the Predacon/Decepticon leader once and for all.
