= Shinzo =

Japanese anime series

- Japanese cover of the Shinzo DVD featuring the main characters

マシュランボー (Mushurambo)
- Genre: Action
- Created by: Izumi Todo
- Anime television series
- Directed by: Tetsuo Imazawa
- Produced by: Tarō Iwamoto (TV Asahi); Kōichi Yada (Toei Advertising); Kōzō Morishita (Toei Animation)
- Written by: Mayori Sekijima
- Music by: Katsumi Horii
- Studio: Toei Animation
- Licensed by: NA: Toei Animation Inc.
- Original network: ANN (TV Asahi)
- English network: AU: Fox Kids; IE: RTÉ2; UK: Fox Kids, BBC Two; US: Jetix, ABC Family
- Original run: February 5, 2000 – September 23, 2000
- Episodes: 32
- Manga
- Written by: Yoshihiro Iwamoto
- Published by: Kodansha
- Imprint: BomBom Comics
- Magazine: Comic BomBom
- Original run: January 2000 – August 2000
- Volumes: 2

Shinzo, known as Mushrambo (マシュランボー, Mashuranbō) in Japan, is a Japanese anime television series produced by TV Asahi, Toei Advertising, and Toei Animation. It was directed by Tetsuo Imazawa, with Mayori Sekijima handling series scripts, Sachiko Kamimura designing the characters and Katsumi Horii composing the music.

In the series, genetically altered creatures known as Enterrans take over Earth and rename it in their own image called Enterra. Now three Enterrans have to protect the last human in order to find the hidden sanctuary called Shinzo and restore the human race. The anime focuses primarily on the adventures they undergo while working to accomplish this task, though battle action becomes the main focus in the middle of the series. Due in part to the popularity of Hunter × Hunter in some areas in the competing timeslot, the series struggled with an average viewership of 3.5%, and was cancelled.

In the United States, the anime was licensed and dubbed by Saban Entertainment & Buena Vista Television with the original Japanese musical score and sound effects replaced with an original American-made musical score and sound effects, as with all of Saban Entertainment's other edited anime dubs.

== Plot ==
In the distant past, the Guardian of the Milky Way galaxy named Lanancuras began to harbor a desire for more power. Because of his connection to the galaxy, he was able to absorb parts of planets and add them to his strength. As a result, he began invading the worlds he was assigned to protect. In the wake of his destruction, a following of creatures from across the galaxy pledged allegiance to Lanancuras and became known as the Kadrians. Taking notice of his ever-growing power and followers, the other Celestial Guardians confronted him; however, he had become too powerful, and they were defeated. Unable to subdue Lanancuras, the Celestial Guardians each gave up a part of their power and combined it into a single new Guardian, Mushra. In a final desperate attempt, they used Mushra's core by transforming it into a powerful card with which to seal Lanancuras in a prison. The prison was created from the remains of planets that had suffered under Lanancuras' tyranny. Because planets are themselves large beings, their combined strength (along with the power of the card) was able to restrain him. Thus Lanancuras was successfully sealed in a large meteorite.

The meteorite was sent off into the galaxy to be sealed forever. Meanwhile, the way Lanancuras had increased his strength had consequences on the planets of the Milky Way. On Earth, around the 22nd century, it was in the shape of a virus that merged with human DNA and destroyed the humans that way. In order to eliminate the virus, scientists worked on combining human DNA with the DNA of animals and other creatures immune to the effects. They succeeded and created a sentient race known as Enterrans (a race of engineered Earthlings) which are based on humans, insects, reptiles, birds, sea creatures, wild beasts, and phantom beasts. Eventually, a cure was found and the human race survived.

However, due to Lanancuras' influence, the Enterrans fought their human creators as well as the robots that worked with the humans, driving the human race to a near extinction state. Luckily, a scientist named Dr. Daigo Tatsuro placed his 4-year-old daughter Yakumo in a sleep chamber in hopes that she would save the human race and find the human sanctuary Shinzo and bring peace back to Earth which was then renamed to Enterra. When the meteor that Lanancuras was imprisoned in struck Earth during the earlier parts of the Human-Enterran War, its fragment had struck an infant Yakumo giving her abilities that she would later discover.

=== First season (episodes 1–21) ===
Upon waking up 300 years later at the age of 17, Yakumo Tatsuro stumbled upon her soon to be companion Mushra while he is strung above a waterfall for impersonating a king. After Yakumo rescues Mushra, they soon run into their other companions Sago and Kutal.

Mushra, Sago and Kutal are then shown to be Hyper-Enterrans, Enterrans who can transform into stronger powered-up versions of themselves; these forms allow them to fight the various Enterrans that come after them. Throughout the first season the main characters fight a collection of Enterrans known as the Seven Enterran Generals, and various independent Enterrans where these Enterrans were either minions of the Seven Enterran Generals or bounty hunters that target Yakumo for the bounty on her head. Each of these Generals rules a region that the gang travels through, which have different types of Enterrans, such as King Daku's land having a majority insect based Enterrans. The defeated Enterrans become En-Cards, which are card-like structures that can be used to increase power in both Enterrans and several machines such as Yakumo's sentient vehicle Hakuba.

=== Second season (episodes 22–32) ===
When the timeline was altered due to events caused by Rusephine removing Mushrambo from the past. The Human-Enterran war never occurred with the two species eventually settling their differences and peacefully coexisting. The ultimate cause of the Enterran genocide during the war in the original timeline was revealed. The Kadrians had devised a plan to free their master: they believed that crashing the meteor into Earth would destroy the seal, thus allowing Lanancuras to escape. The Guardians eventually discovered this plan, but it was too late. With the meteorite already redirected and heading towards Earth, the Guardians held a vow that they would not directly intervene. They reasoned it was the duty of the planet and its inhabitants to defeat Lanancuras. In a stroke of luck, the Kadrians' plan was not a complete success. At impact, the seal holding Lanancuras merely ripped due to the impact; therefore, the Kadrian King was still trapped by the planetary pieces.

In the first timeline, Lanancuras used up a lot of energy to influence the Human-Enterran War when his meteor struck Earth, therefore remaining completely dormant. As this there weren't means to cause the war in the second, he was energized and about to break free from his imprisonment there.

== Production and broadcast ==
Shinzo was produced by Toei Animation, TV Asahi and Toei Advertising, with Tetsuo Imazawa serving as series director and Mayori Sekijima responsible for series composition. Sachiko Kamimura was the character designer and chief animation director, while Katsumi Horii composed the music. The series drew inspiration from the Chinese novel Journey to the West, reinterpreting its characters and journey in a futuristic science fiction setting. Tang Sanzang becomes Yakumo, a girl tasked with reviving the human race rather than retrieving sacred scriptures. Sha Wujing becomes Sago, Zhu Bajie becomes Kutal (who transforms into a tiger) and Sun Wukong becomes Mushra (retaining the character's golden headband and telescoping staff).

The series originally aired on TV Asahi from 5 February to 23 September 2000, comprising 32 episodes broadcast on Saturdays from 6:28 to 6:58 p.m. Its Japanese opening theme, "Power Play", was written, composed and performed by Ayumi Miyazaki, while the ending theme, "Enjoy Punk", was performed by Jet's.

The series made its American television debut on ABC Family on 6 July 2002, airing on Saturday and Sunday mornings at 7:30 a.m. It had originally been scheduled for broadcast on Fox Kids.

== Media ==
=== Manga ===
A two-volume manga version by Yoshihiro Iwamoto predating the show was serialized monthly from January to August 2000 in Kodansha's Comic BomBom. The plot is completely different from the anime version; it is more tragic, and has a happy ending where Mushra and Yakumo get married and raise a daughter. The complete DVD of the anime comes with a "Comic Book Version Mushrambo 3D Sound Special Drama" (audio drama), which includes a digest of the main story and later developments. The voice of Yakumo's father Daigo was provided by Ayumi Miyazaki, who sang the anime's theme song, and the voice of Ganchan in the later part was provided by Yoshihiro Iwamoto, who drew the manga.

=== Anime ===
==== Season 1 ====
No.	Title	Directed by	Written by	Original release date	English release date
1	"The Explosive Roaring Soldier's Sudden Raging Transformation" / "Awakening"; Transliteration: "Gōbaku senshi ikinari dohenshin" (Japanese: 轟爆戦士いきなり怒変身)	Tetsuo Imazawa	Yukito Nonaka	February 5, 2000	July 6, 2002
In the 27th century, a human child named Yakumo awakens, with the mission to find the other humans, and bring peace between them and the mutant Enterrans ruling earth now. After Yakumo's first meeting with Mushra and their ordeal with the Enterran bounty hunter Katris at the remains of the Statue of Liberty, Sago and Kutal will eventually join with them too. Note: Unlike the Japanese dub, this episode of the English Dub has mixed up with the start of second episode, which it's confusing before the next episode and onward continues the story where it was previously left off.
2	"Ten Billion Force! The Crazy Powerful Angry Clenched Fist!" / "Bee-Ware The Hunters"; Transliteration: "100 Oku-riki da!! Suggee zo dotekken!" (Japanese: 100億力だ！！スッゲェぞ怒鉄拳！)	Noriyo Sasaki	Kenichi Yamada	February 12, 2000	July 7, 2002
Yakumo and her new friends land in a nest of Enterran bees ruled by the Queen Bee-Ing as Katris starts to catch up to them. Hyper-Mushra manages to card them where they are regressed back to Enterran cards which are claimed by the group.
3	"Rage Down! The Heinous Spider Brothers, Gold and Silver" / "Web of Evil"; Transliteration: "Dotō!! Gokuaku kumo kyōdai kin to gin" (Japanese: 怒倒！！極悪クモ兄弟・金と銀)	Tetsuji Nakamura	Yoshimichi Hosoi	February 19, 2000	July 13, 2002
A bunch of Enterran spiders kidnap Yakumo in believing a legend that eating a human will make the eater immortal. At the end, when Mushra slashes them after they turned into Enterran cards, Yakumo slaps his face and tearfully throws him out of the group. Thus Yakumo is going with Sago and Kutal by leaving Mushra behind, who was devastated. In another location, the Insect Enterrans' ruler King Daku begins his plot to obtain Yakumo.
4	"Mushra Riots at the Amusement Park?!" / "Day at the Park"; Transliteration: "Mashura, yūenchi de ōabare!?" (Japanese: マシュラ、遊園地で大暴れ！？)	Mitsuo Hashimoto	Mayori Sekijima	February 26, 2000	July 14, 2002
Yakumo, Sago and Kutal are invited to join a festival, while Mushra still roams about. When he gets the chance to do a little revenge for being sent away, he takes it as some Insect Enterrans work on hatching Tombo.
5	"Too Strong! Dokkak, the Insect King!" / "Kiri"; Transliteration: "Tsuyo sugiru! Konchū-ō Dokkaku!!" (Japanese: 強すぎる！昆虫王ドッカク！！)	Harume Kosaka	Kenichi Kanemaki	March 4, 2000	July 20, 2002
Mushra stumbles into a young human girl named Kiri, who is terrified of Enterrans, but promises to show Yakumo the way to Shinzo as King Daku begins his plot.
6	"The Final Battle! Mushra vs. the Insect King" / "Battling Daku"; Transliteration: "Saishū kessen! Mashura VS konchū-ō" (Japanese: 最終決戦！マシュラVS昆虫王)	Tetsuo Imazawa	Hiroyuki Kawasaki	March 11, 2000	July 21, 2002
In an attempt to save Yakumo and Kiri from King Daku, Sago comes up with the plan to be captured themselves. Of course Kiri is not who she seems to be.
7	"Thrust into the New World! The Mysterious Person in the Jungle" / "Into the Jungle"; Transliteration: "Shintairiku totsunyū! Janguru ni hisomu kaijin" (Japanese: 新大陸突入！ジャングルにひそむ怪人)	Noriyo Sasaki	Kenichi Kanemaki	March 18, 2000	July 27, 2002
Arriving in another land roaming with Reptile Enterrans, Kutal's niece and nephews show up and throw the gang on an unexpected adventure. As Mushra accidentally stumbles upon Yakumo bathing, they are ambushed by some Crocodile Enterrans as the Lizard King Waru makes his plans to take out Mushra.
8	"Mushra Clash! School Wars!" / "Reptiles"; Transliteration: "Mashura gekitō! Sukūru uōzu!!" (Japanese: マシュラ激闘！スクールウォーズ！！)	Tetsuji Nakamura	Kenichi Kanemaki	March 25, 2000	July 28, 2002
As Mushra battles Waru, another Enterran named Gyasa, the King of the Snake-Enterrans, appears with the intention of taking out the gang and kidnapping Yakumo.
9	"Defeat! Kutal and Sago Dead!" / "Gyasa"; Transliteration: "Haiboku! Kūtaru, Sāgo shisu!" (Japanese: 敗北！クータル、サーゴ死す！)	Mitsuo Hashimoto	Kenichi Yamada	April 1, 2000	August 4, 2002
After turning Yakumo into stone by throwing her into the water, Gyasa uses dirty tricks to take out Sago and Kutal, leaving Mushra by himself. Can he find a way to defeat Gyasa? Not unless he obtains a new form by taking Sago and Kutal's Enterran Cards into him.
10	"Invincible Super Warrior Mushrambo" / "Mushrambo, the Ultimate Samurai"; Transliteration: "Muteki no chō senshi Mashuranbō" (Japanese: 無敵の超戦士マシュランボー)	Tomoharu Katsumata	Yoshimichi Hosoi	April 8, 2000	August 5, 2002
While Kutal's niece and nephews are making an attempt to rescue Yakumo and prevent her petrified form from being shattered, Mushrambo is able to defeat Gyasa in his first form, but what will happen when he transforms?
11	"Threatening Power! Gyasa's Defeat!" / "Clash of the Hyper-Enterrans"; Transliteration: "Kyōi no chikara da! Gyaza funsai!" (Japanese: 脅威のチカラだ！ギャザ粉砕！)	Tetsuo Imazawa	Yukito Nonaka	April 15, 2000	August 10, 2002
Mushrambo is overpowered by the Hyper Gyasa. Can he find a way to turn the tide of the battle around?
12	"Introduction to Mushra's Mystery Lao Tzu?!" / "The Test"; Transliteration: "Mashura nazo no Rōshi ni nyūmon ka!?" (Japanese: マシュラ・謎の老子に入門か！？)	Harume Kosaka	Mayori Sekijima	April 29, 2000	August 11, 2002
Darba, the supposed wizard of Shinzo, appears with a proposition for the team. But what are his real intentions even when the bounty hunter Huntari makes use of some man-eating plants?
13	"Friend or Foe? Mushrambo, the God of Destruction" / "Ryuma, Lord of the Reptiles"; Transliteration: "Teki ka mikata ka? Hakai-shin Mashuranbō" (Japanese: 敵か味方か？破壊神マシュランボー)	Noriyo Sasaki	Hiroyuki Kawasaki	May 6, 2000	August 17, 2002
The group arrives at another forest after going through the desert, but when Grandora the 3-Headed Ice Dragon attacks the village under Ungra and Ryuma's control, it means trouble for the entire team even when Yakumo runs into the Reptile Enterrans' ruler Ryuma who plans to make use of a black card.
14	"Non-Stop Rampage! The Dark God of Destruction" / "The Dark Spirit of Destruction"; Transliteration: "Nonsutoppu bōsō! Kuroi hakai-shin" (Japanese: ノンストップ暴走！黒い破壊神)	Tetsuji Nakamura	Hiroyuki Kawasaki	May 13, 2000	August 18, 2002
Mushrambo has been turned evil and is now Dark Mushrambo. In the meantime, Ryuma tries to solidify his power by making Yakumo his bride. His wedding gets the most unlikeliest of wedding crashers in the form of Dark Mushrambo.
15	"Robot Kingdom of the Sky Mechano City" / "Mechano City"; Transliteration: "Tenkū no robotto ōkoku mekanoshiti" (Japanese: 天空のロボット王国メカノシティ)	Mitsuo Hashimoto	Kenichi Kanemaki	May 20, 2000	August 24, 2002
The group arrives in a city full of robots, but what will they do when the cops begin to pursue them as their ruler King Nipper is working for the Bird Enterran Caris?
16	"Giant Robot Launch! The Mysterious Card Factory" / "The Giant Robot"; Transliteration: "Kyodai robo hasshin! Nazo no kādo kōjō" (Japanese: 巨大ロボ発進！謎のカード工場)	Tomoharu Katsumata	Kenichi Yamada	May 27, 2000	August 25, 2002
What will the robots do when they learn that Yakumo is a human? Later, Sago and Kutal eventually get killed by falling into King Nipper and Caris' traps and ended up turning into Enterran cards.
17	"No Weaknesses?! Devil's Invention Egg Card" / "The Great War"; Transliteration: "Jakuten nashi!? Akuma no hatsumei eggu kādo" (Japanese: 弱点なし！？悪魔の発明エッグカード)	Tetsuo Imazawa	Kenichi Kanemaki	June 3, 2000	August 31, 2002
Mushra and the robots find out about Yakumo's past and the truth about the robot king, but what happens when Mushra battles Caris to the end in a one-on-one battle?
18	"The Secrets of the Seven Commanders-In-Chief!" / "The Secrets of the Seven"; Transliteration: "7 Daishōgun no himitsu!" (Japanese: 7大将軍の秘密！)	Noriyo Sasaki	Kenichi Kanemaki	June 10, 2000	September 1, 2002
As a machine is using the egg card's power to revive Mushra, Sago, and Kutal, King Nipper sacrifices his life in an attempt to stop Caris and prevent him from killing Yakumo.
19	"Defeat Lucifène, the Strongest King of Wildlife!" / "The Feathered Fiend"; Transliteration: "Taose! Saikyō no chōjū-ō Rushifēnu" (Japanese: 倒せ！最強の鳥獣王ルシフェーヌ)	Harume Kosaka	Hiroyuki Kawasaki	June 17, 2000	September 7, 2002
Mechano City has been destroyed by an attack by Caris' boss Queen Rusephine, so Mushra and company decide to get revenge by attacking the Bird Enterran colonies. What they find is a new challenge, but can they be successful at overcoming it as Rusephine takes in the cards of King Daku and Emperor Ryuma as well as the Enterran cards of Franken: King of the Sea Enterrans, Diehanger: King of the Wild Beast Enterrans, and Kimylas: King of the Phantom Beast Enterrans?
20	"The Great Clash! Mushra vs. Mushrambo" / "The Two Mushrambos"; Transliteration: "Dai gekitotsu! Mashura VS Mashuranbō" (Japanese: 大激突！マシュラVSマシュランボー)	Tomoharu Katsumata	Hiroyuki Kawasaki	June 24, 2000	September 8, 2002
Now that the original Mushramo has been brought to the present and has absorbed the Enterran Cards of the Seven Enterran Generals to become a more monstrous version of him called Dark King Mushrambo, Mushrambo must battle his evil self to prevent the young Yakumo from being killed, but can they succeed without gaining some new powers?
21	"At the End of the Fight..." / "The Battle of One"; Transliteration: "Tatakai no hate ni..." (Japanese: 戦いの果てに・・・)	Mitsuo Hashimoto	Kenichi Kanemaki	July 1, 2000	February 7, 2005
The final battle between Mushrambo and Dark King Mushrambo's is at hand, but which side will prevail?

==== Season 2 ====
No.	Title	Directed by	Written by	Original release date	English release date
22	"I am Mushra, the Mightiest King!" / "A New Beginning"; Transliteration: "Ore wa saikyō-ō Mashura-sama da!" (Japanese: オレは最強王・マシュラさまだ！)	Tetsuo Imazawa	Mayori Sekijima	July 8, 2000	March 1, 2005
Because of the defeat and destruction of the original evil Mushrambo and the Seven Enterran Generals, the timeline is altered to where humans and Enterrans co-exist in peace. Mushra is trapped at the waterfall once again, but freed by the mysterious girl named Binka, who was using her Bazooka. Later on, when Lanancuras' servant Garizani attack them, can they survive without hyper power, or is there another way for Mushra to go hyper?
23	"The Hyper Form of the Hero's Resurrection!" / "Bear Claws"; Transliteration: "Yūsha fukkatsu no haipā fōmu!" (Japanese: 勇者復活のハイパーフォーム！)	Tetsuji Nakamura	Kenichi Yamada	July 15, 2000	March 2, 2005
Binka and Mushra search for Sago and Kutal so Mushrambo can be reformed, but what troubles await them in route? How about two seemingly-friendly furballs.
24	"The Messenger of Hell Named Eilis!" / "Nightmare Dream Center"; Transliteration: "Jigoku no shisha, sono na wa Airisu!!" (Japanese: 地獄の使者、その名はアイリス！！)	Noriyo Sasaki	Hiroyuki Kawasaki	July 22, 2000	March 3, 2005
After discovering a village they had stopped at previously has been ravaged by the Kadrians, leaving Binka severely traumatized, the gang are invited to an amusement park, unaware of it being a trap by Kadrian Commander Eilis to prevent Mushrambo's return. Sure enough, Eilis decides to target Mushra to prevent Mushrambo from ever being reborn. Can the team overcome him and keep Mushra alive?
25	"Awaken, Mushrambo!" / "Eilis of the Storm"; Transliteration: "Mezame yo! Mashuranbō" (Japanese: 目覚めよ！マシュランボー)	Harume Kosaka	Kenichi Kanemaki	July 29, 2000	March 4, 2005
Eilis tries again to take out Mushra, Sago, and Kutal while leaving Binka alive before they can once more fuse to become Mushrambo and prevent Lanancuras' revival. But who will be the victor?
26	"A Reunion Too Late" / "Reviving Yakumo"; Transliteration: "Oso sugita saikai" (Japanese: 遅すぎた再会)	Mitsuo Hashimoto	Kenichi Yamada	August 12, 2000	March 5, 2005
With Eilis carded, the group gets trapped in two different never-ending maze created by Lunaria where one maze contains a Kadrian Pixie and another contains a Kadrian Troll. Their only hope of escape is Yakumo. Can they succeed?
27	"The Last Hope" / "Lanancuras Arises"; Transliteration: "Saigo no kibō" (Japanese: 最後の希望)	Tetsuo Imazawa	Kenichi Kanemaki	August 19, 2000	March 7, 2005
Following Lunaria being carded, Yakumo rejoins the Mushrambo trio and Binka to head to Lanancuras' crash site to try and stop the Kadrian King's revival, but who has the bigger desire to win?
28	"Yakumo Dies at Sunset" / "Lanancuras Unbound"; Transliteration: "Yakumo rakujitsu ni shisu" (Japanese: ヤクモ落日に死す)	Toshiaki Komura	Hiroyuki Kawasaki	August 26, 2000	March 8, 2005
Lanancuras gains his full power and continues the battle against Mushrambo. Who will end up being the victor, especially when it appears that Yakumo is killed.
29	"Endless Death Struggle" / "Mushrambo Meets His Match"; Transliteration: "Hateshinaki shitō" (Japanese: 果てしなき死闘)	Tetsuji Nakamura	Hiroyuki Kawasaki	September 2, 2000	March 9, 2005
Mushrambo continues his battle against Lanancuras, but does he stand a chance without the help of Yakumo and Binka? Unfortunately, Lanancuras is free, and makes his move to ensure that Mushrambo won't be a threat to him, now or ever, with Yakumo having died.
30	"Mushra's Mission!" / "Mushra's Mission"; Transliteration: "Mashura no shimei!" (Japanese: マシュラの使命！)	Mitsuo Hashimoto	Hiroyuki Kawasaki	September 9, 2000	March 10, 2005
Lanancuras's apparent death was unexpected and he appears to be headed toward being the ruler of the world. With help of the hyper forms of Sago and Kutal, Mushra eventually slays Lanancuras with the sword, but it gets broken anyway. After the Celestial Guardians lost their powers and Mushra getting killed with his Enterran card taken and destroyed by Lanancuras, Mushra refuses to give up and calls on a new power source to assist him. Will it be enough to defeat Lanancuras in the end?
31	"Emotional Conflict" / "Soul Survivor"; Transliteration: "Kokoro aru tatakai" (Japanese: 心ある戦い)	Harume Kosaka	Kenichi Kanemaki	September 16, 2000	March 11, 2005
With all hope lost, Mushra vows to destroy Lanancuras one last time, and with the guardian powers revealed he may just succeed, while Binka, Sago and Kutal make an attempt to bring Yakumo back from Lanancuras. What will happen next?
32	"Farewell, Mushrambo" / "Long Live Yakumo"; Transliteration: "Saraba Mashuranbō" (Japanese: さらばマシュランボー)	Tetsuo Imazawa	Mayori Sekijima	September 23, 2000	March 12, 2005
The battle between Mushra and Lanancuras comes to its exciting conclusion, but whose lives will it cost between them, Binka, or the other Celestial Guardians?

== Home media ==
The series was originally released in Japan across eight VHS volumes, with the final volume released on 13 April 2001.

In 2008, Toei Animation announced the first Japanese DVD releases of Shinzo following continued requests from fans. Two approximately 90-minute compilation editions, Kokoro o Chikara ni and Owaranai Chikyū, were released on 21 September 2008.

To commemorate the releases, an overnight fan event was held at Theatre Dia in Ikebukuro on 30 August 2008, attended by voice actors Minami Takayama, Yūko Minaguchi and Aya Hisakawa. The event was sold out and included the announcement of a complete-series DVD collection. The two compilation editions were supervised by Kenji Nakamura, who had previously worked as an assistant director on the original series.

The six-disc Mushrambo Complete DVD was released by Toei Video on 21 January 2009, containing all 32 television episodes. Its bonus disc featured a newly recorded audio drama based on the manga adaptation, featuring members of the original voice cast alongside Kappei Yamaguchi. Additional material included four internet radio programmes and footage from the 2008 fan event.

To commemorate the anime's twentieth anniversary, Toei Animation began streaming all 32 episodes for free on its official YouTube channel on 21 December 2020 through 27 December. The episodes were made available for a limited period.

== Reception ==
KJ Dell'Antonia of Common Sense Media gave the series a mixed assessment, criticising its animation quality and English-language dubbing. The reviewer also argued that Yakumo, despite being central to the story's premise, was frequently overshadowed by the male characters and required rescuing. Nevertheless, Dell'Antonia considered the series a suitable introduction to more complex anime for older children familiar with Pokémon, citing its stylised action and comparatively developed storyline.
