= Gatchaman II =

Japanese anime television series

- Cover of the complete DVD box set
- 科学忍者隊ガッチャマンII
- Genre: Adventure, science fiction
- Created by: Tatsuo Yoshida
- Directed by: Hiroshi Sasagawa
- Music by: Bob Sakuma; Hiroshi Tsutui
- Country of origin: Japan
- Original language: Japanese
- No. of episodes: 52 (list of episodes)

Production
- Executive producer: Kenji Yoshida
- Producers: Ippei Kuri; Masanori Nakano; Masaru Shibata
- Production companies: Tatsunoko Production; Fuji Television

Original release
- Network: FNS (Fuji TV)
- Release: October 1, 1978 – September 23, 1979

Gatchaman II (科学忍者隊ガッチャマンII, Kagaku Ninjatai Gatchaman Tsū; Science Ninja Team Gatchaman II) is the direct sequel to Science Ninja Team Gatchaman, set two years after the first television series. After the defeat of Leader X, he exacts his revenge by capturing, brainwashing and mutating a young intersex child known as Sammy into Gel Sadra and making them the new leader of Galactor and successor to Berg Katze. While Galactor returns, Dr. Nambu and the International Science Organization bring the Science Ninja Team Gatchaman back into active duty. This series and Gatchaman F would be the basis of the English-language version named Eagle Riders. Sentai Filmworks has licensed the series and released the complete series on DVD on April 18, 2017.

== Plot ==
Two years after the defeat of Galactor and the apparent death of Condor Joe, a cruise ship is attacked by Leader X, killing nearly everyone on board. One of the survivors, a young child known as Sammy, whose gender is purposefully left ambiguous, but is implied to be a hermaphrodite, is captured by X and rapidly aged into the bizarre and androgynous new commander of Galactor, known as Gel Sadra (a name loosely based on the German word die Gier, meaning "lust" or "greed", and "sadism"), acting as a replacement for Berg Katze from the first series after his suicide. Though they have the appearance of an adult, Gel Sadra is not immune to throwing childish tantrums and behaving immaturely when things don't go according to plan.

In the midst of the revival of Galactor, the Science Ninja Team is called back into action, with a shady man known as Hawk Getz acting as the replacement for Joe. Getz is quickly revealed to be a Galactor agent in disguise (and had killed the actual Getz who was to join), and winds up killed by a mysterious feather shuriken. After hints spread in the first three episodes, Joe reappears in the fourth episode, having somehow survived his fatal injuries at the end of the first series, and rejoins the team. It is later revealed that he was rescued by an ex-Galactor scientist at the brink of his death, and was the subject of various cybernetic augmentations.

Later in the series, a female scientist known as Dr. Pandora is introduced, who had lost her husband and child in the cruise ship disaster. Unbeknownst to her, her child Sammy survived and is in fact Gel Sadra.

With the new series, the characters were given new mecha and weapons, the space-worthy New GodPhoenix and individual mecha all given a noticeable bird motif. The New GodPhoenix is larger than the original, and equipped with "Pima" a robot pilot. There were also minor design changes to some characters, to go along with the new animation style (Jun's hair became shorter and straighter, in one example). The characters also advanced two years in age, Jinpei now approximately thirteen years old.

== Characters ==
- Ken. Voiced by: Katsuji Mori
- Joe: Voiced by: Isao Sasaki
- Jun: Voiced by: Kazuko Sugiyama
- Jinpei: Voiced by: Yoku Shioya
- Ryu: Voiced by: Shingo Kanemoto
- Dr.Nambu: Voiced by: Toru Ohira
- Dr.Pandora: Voiced by: Miyuka Ieda
- Marstora: Voiced by: Osamu Ichikawa
- Dr.Rafael: Voiced by: Koichi Chiba
- Gel Sadra: Voiced by: Masaru Ikeda
- Leader X: Voiced by: Nobuo Tanaka
- Hawk Getz: Voiced by: Masato Ibu
- Pimer: Voiced by: You Inoue
- Anderson: Voiced by: Teiji Ōmiya
- Narrator: Voiced by: Shusei Nakamura

== Production ==
Following the first feature film of the original Gatchaman in 1978, and a radio show of the series which previewed some of the new installments, the sequel series was released on October 1, the same date as the original series broadcast in 1972. It ran for 52 episodes, and was immediately followed up by the third and final series, Gatchaman Fighter.

Though neither of the sequels were licensed and adapted by Sandy Frank, some Gatchaman II merchandise was sold under the Battle of the Planets name, most notably the New GodPhoenix model, causing confusion for those who had seen the English adaptation.

=== Adaptations and changes ===
In 1978, the original Gatchaman was released in South Korea. In 1980, a compilation film called Eagle 5 Brothers (독수리 5 형제, Dokksuri Hyeongje) was made based on Gatchaman II and Fighter. The episodes were later released to South Korea in 1996. Both versions of Eagle 5 Brothers weren't censored. However, there were subtle changes made that are characteristic of remastering which included different hair colors, uniforms, and a complete redesign of Dr. Pandora's child as a boy, despite their gender in the original being left ambiguous. Eagle 5 Brothers was also dubbed into Spanish and released as "Space Heroes" ("Heroes del Espacio"), and alternatively released under other titles including; "Space General Hero", "The Five Eagle Stars" ("Las Cinco Estrellas del Aguila"), and "Five Star Combat Group".

In 1996, Gatchaman II was licensed by Saban Entertainment and combined with the third series, Gatchaman F (Fighter), to create Eagle Riders. 47 of the 52 episodes of the series were translated in the adaptation, though heavily edited to remove violence and other elements found objectionable. Episodes 6, 16-17, 28, and 35 were not used in the translation, and episode 21 (Youth's Broken Wings) was moved and aired in place of the original episode 6 (Attack Of The Pyramid Power).

Elements removed from the series included the Queen Margaret cruise ship disaster in the first episode, along with the transformation of Sammy Pandora into Gel Sadra (called Mallanox in the dub and initially stated as being male). Scenes depicting destruction in cities were also edited to remove references to death, and the Galactor soldiers (now christened Vorak) were said to be androids and would be "deactivated" instead of having been killed. Character names were Westernized in the dub, as well as the entire soundtrack being changed.

To segue the two series together, Gel Sadra's death at the end of Gatchaman II was edited and rewritten so that instead of dying, "Mallanox" is instead transformed further by Cybercon (Leader X) into a new form called Happy Boy (originally Count Egobossler, the nemesis in F).

Eagle Riders only had 13 episodes broadcast in the US, as the translation and editing were reviled by fans of Gatchaman, and the Saban adaptation was pulled from airwaves soon afterwards, not having been seen since.

On December 20, 2016, Sentai Filmworks announced their license for the series. They released an uncut, subtitled DVD set on April 18, 2017. This set is now out of print and no longer available directly from Sentai.
