= Gatchaman Fighter =

Japanese anime television series

- 科学忍者隊ガッチャマンF
- Genre: Adventure, science fiction
- Created by: Tatsuo Yoshida
- Directed by: Seitarô Hara
- Music by: Hiroshi Tsutui
- Country of origin: Japan
- Original language: Japanese
- No. of episodes: 48 (list of episodes)

Production
- Executive producer: Kenji Yoshida
- Producers: Ippei Kuri; Tomoyuki Mikata
- Production companies: Tatsunoko Production; Fuji Television

Original release
- Network: FNS (Fuji TV)
- Release: October 7, 1979 – August 31, 1980

Gatchaman Fighter or Gatchaman F (科学忍者隊ガッチャマンF(ファイター), Kagaku Ninjatai Gatchaman Faitā; Science Ninja Team Gatchaman Fighter) is the direct sequel to Gatchaman II. In the continuing saga, a surviving fragment of Leader X mutates into Leader Z, and recruits megalomaniac Count Egobossler to create an army to conquer the world. In order to defeat this new enemy, the Science Ninja Team Gatchaman return with stronger weapons.

== Description ==
Picking up immediately where Gatchaman II left off in storyline, the third and final series debuted a week later, running for 48 episodes. Aspects such as the animation, music, and mecha designs were further overhauled with F.

== Plot synopsis ==
After Leader X is seemingly destroyed for good at the end of Gatchaman II, a fragment of him that survived grows and mutates into Z. With the head of the Egobossler family, Count Egobossler (and his two subordinates Mechandol and Kempler), Z is bent on destroying the Earth, and the Science Ninja Team, once more.

In the wake of Anderson's death, Dr. Nambu has become the new head of the ISO, while the team is now confined to the Gallatown (aka "G-Town") underwater base. Engineer Kamo is introduced, and after the New GodPhoenix is destroyed early on, the team receives the new Gatchaspartan as their mecha. The Gatchaspartan has a special mode as well, called Hypershoot, that can only be utilized by Ken (with his new "Gatchafencer" sword).

As the series progresses, it is learned that the radiation exposure from constant use of the Hypershoot is slowly killing Ken, and that continued use would mean death. Meanwhile, Z plans to destroy the earth with an antimatter asteroid, codenamed "Poison Apple".

The final eight episodes of the series took a darker turn, with more death and destruction involved. These episodes were not included in the Eagle Riders adaptation, though a segment of #47 was inserted into one of the other episodes, and the opening sequence shows clips from the final scene of #48.

The mecha in this series became more like the standard anime mecha seen in other series around the time, rather than the 'bird' theme in Gatchaman II.

== Adaptations and changes ==
18 episodes of F were utilized for Eagle Riders, and went through the same edit procedures that episodes of II had gone through, though Saban Entertainment also began merging some episodes together, and adding scenes from otherwise-untranslated episodes in new context into others.

Count Egobossler's name was changed to Happy Boy (for the grin-faced mask and his laughing) in the dub, and his origin was also rewritten. Originally, Egobossler was the son of the original Count, but killed his father (after he witnessed his mother being murdered by him) and imprisoned his brother, becoming the new Count in the process. In Eagle Riders, Happy Boy was instead the new form of Mallanox (originally named Gel Sadra in Gatchaman II), transformed by Cybercon in a new attempt to defeat the Eagle Riders.

Ken's deterioration was also toned down in the dub, with a few select episodes dealing with the plot point translated. In Eagle Riders, Hunter is cured of the illness before the end of the series, while in F, the supposed cure was not effective for long, and Ken's condition worsened.

The final eight episodes, which dealt with the death of Nambu, Ken on the verge of dying from use of the Hypershoot, Z's "Poison Apple" plan, and the team's final confrontation against Z, were not included. Instead, episode 15 (Hell's Burning Ambition) was used as the series finale.

On March 21, 2017, Sentai Filmworks announced their license for the series. They released an uncut, subtitled DVD set on July 4, 2017.
