= List of Gatchaman II episodes =

This article is a list of episodes from the television show Gatchaman II in order by production number.

== Episodes ==
No.	Title	Original release date
1	"Governor X's Counterattack"; Transliteration: "Sōsai X no gyakushū" (Japanese: 総裁Xの逆襲)	October 1, 1978
A shining object collides with the luxury liner Queen Margareth. A child with special chromosomes is abducted from the sinking ship. Governor X has returned and with the help of his scientific power the child grows very quickly. It is given the name of Gel Sadra and enters on the task of being the new Galactor leader. Soon, numerous scientists and soldiers begin to disappear. Elsewhere, Dr. Nambu has already predicted the counterattack of Galactor. He has had the Science Ninja Team resume their activities at their underwater carrier base G-Town, which capable of changing its location. The revived Science Ninja Team greets Getz as the new G-2 and is ordered by Nambu to investigate some ruins on Easton Island. But Getz is a member of the enemy forces. The ruins are a trap and Gel Sadra is waiting there. The Science Ninja Team ends up in the ruins facing an enemy robot in the form of a statue representing a deity, equipped with laser rays. It shoots at anything that moves.
2	"The Mysterious Feather Shuriken"; Transliteration: "Nazo no hane shuriken" (Japanese: 謎の羽手裏剣)	October 8, 1978
.. and the team doesn't know what to do. But thanks to a bomb somebody installed in the robot statue it is destroyed, and the team sees Getz killed by a feather shuriken. They pursue a fleeing shadow which looks like Joe. But was it really Joe? Could he be alive? The shadow leads them to a secret Galactor base which uses the ruins of the shrine as camouflage. Galactor continues in its preparations to launch the missile. The Science Ninja Team wants to stop them and they get into their individual mechas The five of them start an all-out attack on the base. Because of the Ninja Team's attack, the Galactor operation ends in failure, but Ken's Eagle Sharp is wrapped in the explosion's flames and crashes in a forest. While losing consciousness, Ken faintly hears Joe's voice. When Ken regains consciousness, a man is standing before him. It's the former Galactor physician, Doctor Raphael. He tells them of his childhood, revealing his hate for Galactor. Then Jinpei notices that Raphael's shadow is similar to Joe's. Dr. Raphael tells them that it was him who saved them from Galactor.
3	"The Black Knights from Hell"; Transliteration: "Jigoku no burakkunaitsu" (Japanese: 地獄のブラックナイツ)	October 15, 1978
Somebody sneaks into Galactor's Headquarters and a plan to build a huge base in San Frangeles is relayed to the Science Ninja Team. Ken and the others are baffled at the voice of the communication. It sounds exactly like Joe's. Elsewhere, Galactor has a corps of knights, clad in black armour made of a special Sigma lightray-strengthened steel, sneak in places to steal nuclear energy. The plan is to have them destroy the city of San Frangeles while the base is still being completed. The Black Knights are actually internationally wanted criminals. Since the Science Ninja Team has been told that the escapees have secretly built a town, they go to the ruins of the prison on Alamo Island by San Frangeles. Jinpei is given precise instructions by a voice that sounds like Joe's and the Ninja Team discovers an enemy base that is still being constructed on the bottom of the sea. They sneak into it and install a time bomb. However, they are captured by Gel Sadra. The Science Ninja Team dares to try the Tornado Fighter to escape. The base explodes and they end up floating on the sea, from where they are again rescued by a mysterious person.
4	"Has Joe returned?!" Transliteration: "Kaette kita jō!?" (Japanese: かえってきたジョー!?)	October 22, 1978
In the country Amelia, between the cities New Jork and Scratton, there's the Dera Desert. Below that desert, Galactor is building a scecret base which is supposed to become a very important military strong point. But because they have rushed its completion, a huge explosions occurs and triggers a 9.2 magnitude earthquake in the area. The two cities get into a very critical situation. In order to find out what is happening, the team launches a sensor-equipped rocket drill into the Earth. The data is sent to the New God Phoenix and analyzed by Nambu. However, after the launch, the team is ambushed by Galactor and, yet again, the mysterious person saves them. The only way to save the cities is to dive under the desert in the Condor Attacker, since it can take the pressure. Through the explosive power of the Fire Targetter, which is equipped with the ultra powerful Tektay explosive, the mantle convection can be calmed down. However, there's no G-2 to pilot the attacker. Just at this moment, Condor Joe finally appears alive before the Science Ninja Team. Then Ken and the others face the mecha which has appeared, while Joe accomplishes his task perfectly.
5	"The Big Attack of the Mysterious Cavemen"; Transliteration: "Nazo no genjin dai shūrai" (Japanese: 謎の原人大襲来)	October 29, 1978
In the underdeveloped jungle country Fruginia, a village is destroyed by cavemen. Soon after, Neanderthal cavemen attack the country of Amehon, which is 200 kilometers away. They are immigrants from Fruginia who have been transformed by Galactor with the help of a special liquid. Among them is Toro, the father of young Shiro, whom Ken and the others met earlier by coincidence. Galactor plans to transform all of humankind into cavemen, and, wants to pour chemicals into the water reservoirs to achieve this. However, the Science Ninja Team stops them. Galactor then releases a demonic energy which makes the cavemen violent and dangerous. They start to destroy the city. The mecha controlling the energy shoots down the God Phoenix. The team gets into the city, but can't confront the cavemen because they're humans. But when Toro is coincidentally reunited with his son and refuses to destroy things, the demonic energy flows backwards into the mecha. The enemy mecha starts moving by itself and ends up exploding. Consequently, the love of the united father and son has smashed the Galactor plans.
6	"The Shocking Pyramid Power"; Transliteration: "Shōgeki no piramiddopawa" (Japanese: 衝撃のピラミッドパワー)	November 5, 1978
South of the Road Island, accidents involving ships and airplanes keep happening. There are no clear messages and the cause of the accidents is unknown. The Science Ninja Team suspects that the experimental city in the middle of that island, Egypt, has something to do with it. The city has been built in order to collect the pyramid power, which is impossible to control when rising. Jinpei goes to Egypt alone to investigate. There he meets Yukari, the daughter of Dr. Sugata, the leader of the development of the pyramid system and the city. However, Sugata has asked Galactor to help him in the construction of Egypt, despite knowing they are evil. Soon after completion of the system, a huge pyramid shows up that had earlier been hidden in the volcano of the island. It sucks the energy out of the smaller pyramids. Then, the city is destroyed together with all the employees and the VIPs visiting the city for the inauguration of the system. Dr. Sugata's daughter is there too and is almost killed. When seeing this, Sugata asks Gel Sadra for help. When she refuses, he notices for the first time that he may have made a mistake. Following his suggestion, the Science Ninja Team uses the Firebird Shadow Separation, creating multiple firebirds and aligning them into a huge pyramid larger than the one from the enemy. They succeed in destroying the enemy pyramid this way.
7	"The Terrible Mutant Operation"; Transliteration: "Kyōfu no myūtanto sakusen" (Japanese: 恐怖のミュータント作戦)	November 7, 1978
Sosai X's voice resounds: "Did you see that, Gel Sadra? This is the space plant Redda which I manufactured". Through Governor X's mysterious extraterrestrial science, the artificial space plant Redda is born. By coincidence, a boy named Harry finds one seed which has been blown away, and takes it back home. Sprouting, Redda grows very quickly and attacks Jinpei, who has come to visit Harry. But suddenly, Redda withers when it is eaten at by huge swallow-tails caterpillars. Soon, the seed is spread out by Galactor in the city of Newshington. The city is converted into a jungle. But since Reddy is neither hurt by fire nor by blades, Jinpei proposes using its natural enemy, the swallow-tail caterpillars. The caterpillars are collected immediately and spread out in the city. Through this measure, Redda suffers a total defeat due to this measure. The Science Ninja Team also destroys the Galactor base which was still under construction. However, after eating Redda, the swallow-tails grow very quickly and soon end their short lifespan.
8	"The Firebird of the Moon"; Transliteration: "Tsukisekai no hinotori" (Japanese: 月世界の火の鳥)	November 19, 1978
A dark Galactor satellite keeps stealing space satellites and destroying them. It can absorb radiowaves, infrared waves and light, thus it is able to evade any radar. First a satellite investigating Mars disappears, then a communication satellite, then a space ferry and finally a weather observation satellite. Galactor wants to have the hindering Earth satellites out of the way so they can attack the Sun with a long range beam cannon from their base on the back side of the Moon. Jun and Jinpei board an observation satellite on Nambu's orders to find out who really is behind all this. However, the satellite is attacked, and Jinpei ends up falling into the enemy's hand. Additionally, a satellite to detect new raw material resources is attacked and the Saturn Rubin is stolen. It is said to let the power of the beam cannon increase. Joe uses the small space ship, Swanboat and gets into the dark fortress through the garbage disposal opening. He fails at the first try however, since the Swanboat was defective, and only succeeds when trying again. He detects the enemy base on the Moon. The Science Ninja Team sneaks into that base, following the dark fortress. Joe saves Jinpei who had become a hostage. Afterwards, they blow up the base. The dark fortress escapes for a time, but they smash it with the Firebird.
9	"The Downfall of Berg Katse"; Transliteration: "Metsubō no berukukattse" (Japanese: 滅亡のベルクカッツェ)	November 26, 1978
Gel Sadra plans to destroy the Science Ninja Team with the Supermissile "Sea Tiger", from which it is supposedly impossible to escape, even if detected. However, Governor X loses his patience because of the many previous failures and wants to rebuke Gel Sadra for her arrogance. "Don't you think you take the Science Ninja Team too lightly? Berg Katse has fallen because of this as well". Gel Sadra answers: "No, that may seem so because I always have the self-confidence to defeat them." X enumerates the many times that Berg Katse failed. Galactor was very proud of its former scientific power, but all the mechas it constructed were no match for the Science Ninja Team's wits and courage... But Gel Sadra's arrogance doesn't diminish, even after she has to hear all this. With the Galactor North Pol base before its eyes, the God Phoenix is caught in the magnetic light rays of Sea Tiger. Joe completes a torn wiring circuit with his own body. Doing this, he allows the team to use the Firebird. As a result, they destroy Sea Tiger, the enemy base and foil Gel Sadra at the same time. Nevertheless, she answers to Governor X: "In these unsecure times, failure is the base for success".
10	"Snowstorm at the Equator"; Transliteration: "Sekidō no yuki arashi" (Japanese: 赤道の雪嵐)	December 3, 1978
Suddenly, the islands in the South Pacific Ocean are surprised by strange weather. Tens of thousands of people freeze to death because of the wind, snow and icy cold. This is caused by Galactor using the Earth's magnetic field to manipulate the Van Allen belt. In the middle of a magnetic storm, Ryu is sent to do some solo investigation in his Horned Tank, but he is dragged along by the ocean currents and propelled onto the beach of a lone island. There he happens to meet an old man named Rokko who breeds sharks. Ryu learns from Rokko that there is a Galactor base operating an antimagnetic ray canon in the coral reef in the ocean in front of the island. Ken and the others hurry there and together with Ryu they attack the Galactor coral base. They leave Rokko behind who is dying because of the cold weather. But since Galactor is using a special magnetic field with only one pole, their ray cannon disables all the functions of the God Phoenix. However, a harpoon they received from Rokko saves them from this critical situation, since the harpoon is not affected by any magnetic field. The Science Ninja Team smashes the enemy base, but they cannot save one old man.
11	"Struggle! Hypernium 600"; Transliteration: "Sōdatsu! haipuruniumu 600" (Japanese: 争奪! ハイプルニウム600)	December 10, 1978
Because of a defect in their car, Ken and Jinpei have a breakdown in the desert. A young girl named Julia takes them in her car. She tells them that she's on her way to the harbor to meet her older brother Jeff, who works as a secret guardsman at the ISO. But the three of them are attacked in the harbor by the Black Raven mecha corps and Julia ends up heavily injured. Governor X is searching for a new core element, Hypernium 600, which is said to be 600 times stronger than the old core element, Platonium. He starts blindly attacking the cities surrounding the ISO secret hangar in the Abata desert, with his raven mechas. Jeff learns that the next target for the attack is the city of Kinzu. The hospital that his younger sister has been taken to is located in this city. In order to hand over the Hypernium 600 to the enemy and save his sister, he goes to steal it. Ken goes to stop Jeff and to reclaim the Hypernium. Meanwhile, Joe and the rest of the team go to the enemy base with the God Phoenix. On their way there, they encounter the raven mechas which unite and form one huge bird, then attach themselves to the God Phoenix. Using "Bird Diving", the Ninja Team gets rid of the ravens attached to the hull, and destroy the enemy base with a missile. Ken forgives Jeff for his fault, and Julia stays alive.
12	"The Secret of Dr. Raphael"; Transliteration: "Dr. rafferu no himitsu" (Japanese: Dr.ラッフェルの秘密)	December 17, 1978
Observatories and weather stations all over the world are attacked by UFOs. Additionally, authorities in the field of space communication are assassinated one after the other. Even Nambu can't guess the true intentions behind the incidents. In order to protect Dr. Kasshingu of the Irigutchi observatory, the Science Ninja Team goes to his whereabouts. But it's too late, they meet Dr. Kasshingu as he is already dying. The culprit is Galactor. Before dying, Dr. Kasshingu tells them that it was Dr. Raphael's Leapwave which made space communication possible. Upon hearing Dr. Raphael's name, Joe disappears from the sight of Ken and the others. Elsewhere Governor X is afraid of Dr. Raphael because he could unveil his secret. When X learns that Dr. Raphael is the only one able to send out the Leapwave, he goes berserk and orders Gel Sadra to pull the modulation waves of the Leapwave into his base and to reverse them. This way, he gives the nuclear missile launch systems a "go" order, with the aim of provoking a nuclear war. The whole world is plunged into a nuclear crisis without warning. Raphael has learned this and murmurs "I am the one who called Sosai X from space. I have to take the responsibility." He then orders Joe to destroy the missiles of both parties with the antigravitational missile. A nuclear war is averted by a hair's breadth.
13	"Youthful G-2"; Transliteration: "Seishun no G2 gō" (Japanese: 青春のG2号)	December 24, 1978
Joe has sneaked alone into a Galactor base, searching for Governor X. A mysterious girl named Cathy appears before him and tells him that Governor X has moved to the volcano Vesuvio. X has indeed moved to a base in the interior of that volcano, a base built by Berg Katse. X gets angry at a town built by people who are using the volcano's energy. He plans to destroy the city with missiles that will destroy the Earth's crust. Magma streams into the subway system of the city. Elsewhere, Nambu who is the architects of the city, has a missile installed in the God Phoenix. This missile will solidify magma. He does this in order to save the city. However, they meet resistance from the enemy and the missile is wrecked. Joe intends to activate the magma solidifying device himself by throwing himself into the magma and pressing the switch. Cathy is a cyborg like Joe, and she has fallen in love with him. She seizes an opportunity, snatches the device from Joe and throws herself into the magma in order to activate it. She leaves behind the words "It was a short, but wonderful time with you". This puts an end to a love which lasted only half a day. In Joe's head, Dr. Raphael's voice resounds: "You have only one aim - you did understand that, didn't you. Go, Joe!!"
14	"Red Impulse from Space"; Transliteration: "Uchū no reddoinparusu" (Japanese: 宇宙のレッドインパルス)	December 31, 1978
A mysterious UFO flies over cities and mountainous regions all over the world. Additionally, airplane passengers who vanished half a year ago appear again, without memory. Because the spaceship has come to request to talk with humankind, the Science Ninja Team undertakes the task on a remote island in the South Sea. The person who exits the space craft is the famous Earth Defense Force pilot Major Borg, who was believed to be dead, killed in combat against Galactor. He says that when he was saved by that spaceship, Kentaro Washio was alive inside that ship. When Ken learns that his father, who sacrificed himself to save the Earth, is alive, he sways. He takes off in the G-1, following the UFO which took off after Borg exited. He sees his father through a window, but then crashes against a wall. Borg saves him and, led by Borg, Ken leaves in order to meet his father. Borg's son has been taken hostage by Galactor and Borg has been forced to set a trap for Ken. The true face of Kentaro Washio is the one of a Galactor member. However, Ken's sense of justice impresses Borg. He shoots the imposter and Ken is saved by a hair's breadth. But Ken's father will live forever in his heart.
15	"G-5 with the Pure Heart"; Transliteration: "Junjō no G5 gō" (Japanese: 純情のG5号)	January 7, 1979
Galactor's cruise missile crashes and explodes in a fishing village. Its inhabitants have disappeared. Ryu is sent to investigate and saves a girl named Yuka who is pursued by the villagers because they suspect her of arson. Yuka feels love at first sight for Ken, whom she meets because of the investigation. She tries to ensnare him. However, Ken is cold towards her, he does not understand such feelings. Elsewhere, Ryu has fallen in love with Yuka. He has watched everything and tries to comfort her. When she says that she lost a finger ring and that it fell into the sea, Ryu with his pure heart believes her immediately and jumps into the sea in order to search for it. He finds a pearl, and by coincidence, he also finds the cruise missile's memory chip that has sunk at the bottom of the sea. Ryu gives Yuka the pearl and hurries towards his comrades with the memory chip. In the analysis it results that the target of the missile was an observatory. Sosai X has ordered the destruction of the observatory because he was afraid that his own secret could be revealed. When the first cruise missile crashed, he ordered the witnesses to be captured and forced to work on building the second cruise missile. Then, the second cruise missile is launched. The Science Ninja Team goes to board the missile directly, by flying over it with the God Phoenix, to alter its course. Because of Ryu's action, the operation succeeds. Due to its opposite programming, the missile turns around and destroys the Galactor carrier. Because of Ryu's deed, Yuka discovers true feelings for him and has tears in her eyes.
16	"Black Out Joe"; Transliteration: "Kūhaku no jō" (Japanese: 空白のジョー)	January 14, 1979
A Galactor traitor steals a secret micro file from a base and gets it to the ISO headquarters. In order to decode the file, Joe goes to the Ongurei Research Institute where they have some special decoding equipment. But there's an electronic transmitter attached to the file. Its signal is detected by Galactor and they proceed to attack Joe. Saved from the critical situation by Ken and the others, Joe hurries towards the research institute again. But a strong headache attacks him. He is blinded and falls towards a valley. "What's happening, this is not supposed to be happening to my body again" he thinks. While losing consciousness, Joe remembers his past, when he found out that his father was a Galactor member, when he died as a result from an old wound he got in his head, and when he was resurrected as a cyborg. Joe is saved by Jun and regains consciousness. The file is safe. He notices that his cyborg body reacts to the transmitter attached to the file and that this was the cause for his blinding. A moment later, the two are surrounded by Galactor, but with Joe's threatening strength, the approaching enemy soldiers are defeated. But even with the newest computer, it is not possible to decode the mysterious file.
17	"The Devilish Equation"; Transliteration: "Akuma no hōteishiki" (Japanese: 悪魔の方程式)	October 21, 1979
An experimental city named Seatoland that swims in the ocean, has been built by the ISO. It is attacked by a Galactor monster called Umiba, and faces total destruction. When this message is received, the Science Ninja Team is mobilized, but Dr. Siski, in charge of Seatoland, refuses to collaborate with them. Milly, the doctor's daughter, has been taken hostage by Galactor during the attack. The doctor himself has been intimidated and forced to collaborate with Galactor. The doctor finally tells Gel Sadra the equation which increases energy and allows the extremely powerful magnetic fields to be used. The doctor is then ordered to lure the Science Ninja Team into their deep sea base. Jun has overheard this by coincidence and knows now that her friend from childhood, Milly, is still alive and has become a Galactor hostage. Jun keeps these dangerous news away from Ken and the others. She sneaks into the deep sea base in the Marihole, together with the doctor. However, he punches her out before they land in the base. The God Phoenix follows them, but is stopped by Umiba. Jun wakes up before Gel Sadra and Galactor troops. She threatens Gel Sadra and forces her to free Milly, however Dr. Siski is shot. Jun gets very angry and defeats the Galactor troops, Gel Sadra however flees and blows up the base, attempting to kill Jun. But this also disables Umiba, thus freeing the God Phoenix. Jun and Milly can flee and are reunited with the rest of the Ninja Team.
18	"The Spaceship Cannot Answer"; Transliteration: "Uchūsen ōtō sezu" (Japanese: 宇宙船応答せず)	January 28, 1978
A spaceship is being repaired by Jun. Jinpei releases a safety button because he is threatened by a gun, causing the spaceship to take off. The robot threatening Jinpei turns out to be a girl who introduces herself as Sachiko. Sachiko wants to meet her father, Tetsutaro Arimura, who works as research head at the Earth Investigation Station Moa. Following her wish, the ship makes a forced landing at the space station. But no one is there. While searching for Arimura, they coincidentally run into Galactor and get into a difficult situation. Galactor's goal is to steal data tapes of the Mantle energy and occupy the station. Using the two as hostages, they rob the Mantle energy data from Arimura. But the Science Ninja Team quickly arrives to rescue Jinpei and forces Galactor to retreat by shooting the artificial gravity device. Gel Sadra believed that this was a decisive attack and was only able to timidly hand over one tape to Governor X.
19	"The Trap in the Other Dimension"; Transliteration: "Ijigenkūkan no wana" (Japanese: 異次元空間のワナ)	February 4, 1979
Communication with police and military forces in the highland of Oshia keeps getting cut off. Joe has been behaving strangle as of late, and as Ryu follows him, he disappears in that same spot. Ryu leaves behind the words "spiral galaxy!?". The Science Ninja Team thinks that all this is the deed of Galactor and starts an investigation in the Oshia region immediately. There, Governor X's new weapon, Galamoeba, is hidden and waiting. The Science Ninja Team tries to resist with the God Phoenix, but they are hauled inside the enemy mecha. There they are released into another dimension. The humans who disappeared were also in that other dimension. They had been brainwashed in order to become soldiers to build the solar shift plan. The Science Ninja Team is sentenced by Gel Sadra to vanish with the other dimension in twenty minutes. Ryu is floating around in this dimension and Joe rescues him with his car. Meanwhile the others plot a daring escape with the Firebird, attacking and breaking the wall of the dimension. But Galactor's scientific power keeps coming up with horrible inventions day after day.
20	"Crisis in G-Town"; Transliteration: "G taun kikiippatsu" (Japanese: Gタウン 危機一髪)	February 11, 1979
Tojo island, in the country Rizoto, sinks into the sea because of mysterious movements in the Earth's crust. Jun has gone to investigate the small islands in the vicinity and goes into a cave on one island. There she falls into a trap of a Galactor spy disguised as a survivor. The spy then disguises herself as Jun and penetrates G-Town. In the engineering room she installs a cloaking device. G-Town is being led towards a Galactor trap on the bottom of the sea. In reality, the spy is Eva, the daughter of Bill Douglas, who has developed the machinery of G-Town. She is being used by Galactor who told her the lie that her father was killed by the Science Ninja Team. Elsewhere, Jun has escaped from the enemy's prison. She attended the death of Bill Douglas there who was severely tortured. Jun goes back to G-Town and tells Eva what actually happened. Jun gives her a keepsake from her father. Eva, having learned the truth, saves G-Town and sacrifices herself by blowing up the Galactor base with rockets she carries.
21	"Broken Wings of Youth"; Transliteration: "Seishun no ore ta tsubasa" (Japanese: 青春の折れた翼)	February 18, 1979
Ken goes to the luxurious residence of his old friend Karl III, with whom he had lost contact. Karl is the successor to the leadership of a group of 300 enterprises in the whole world and is now organizing a meeting of the former pupils of the flying school which he and Ken attended. But Ken's heart is heavy because he has a task to verify whether or not the rumour that Karl wants to build an empire and conquer the world is true. But the rumour is true as Ken finds out when he's searching the house, whereby Lisa catches him. Together they find a secret passageway and hear Karl speaking to his troops. Karl is also secretly collaborating with Galactor. He offered them the Mantle Power-up Plan in exchange for weapons. Ken and Lisa are detected though. Karl tells Ken the truth and then wants to execute him and his fiancé, Lisa (who also attended the flying school together with Ken and Karl). In that moment Gel Sadra appears before Karl and points a gun at him. He was also being used by Galactor. Lisa dies protecting Karl. After Lisa's death, Karl gets very angry at being used and runs towards Gel Sadra. He is consequently killed as well, but before dying he activates a self-destruct mechanism he installed beforehand. Ken has not been able to save the two and vents his anger on Gel Sadra who however slips away again however, just before the house blows up
22	"Mysterious Stonehenge"; Transliteration: "Nazo no sutōnhenji" (Japanese: 謎のストーンヘンジ)	February 25, 1979
People keep collapsing everywhere. 20,000 humans die of unknown causes. Since radioactivity has been detected at the same time, the Science Ninja Team starts searching for its source. While investigating, Jinpei and Ryu encounter three boys and go with them to the Negiris plateau. The boys love UFOs and wanted to try to establish a contact with the extraterrestrials. They say they caught some strange radio waves while doing so. Following its source, Jinpei, Ryu and the boys arrive at Stonehenge. At that moment, a solarshifter appears out of the Stonehenge stones and Jinpei and the boys are taken away. Ryu is left behind. He meets up with Ken and the others. They want to save Jinpei, but can't approach because of a strong barrier in form of a dome. Elsewhere, Jinpei has heard the whole secret of the base. He tricks Gel Sadra, taking advantage of her way of thinking, and escapes the holding cell, taking the solarshifter's programming chip with him. Then he has one of the boys bring the chip to Ken and the others and goes back to save the other two boys. The Galactor plan had been to unite the Mantle energy with space energy, but the experiment was what caused the cruel side effects. Its weak point is exactly at the top of the barrier dome. The God Phoenix penetrates there (after Jinpei managed to escape with the two boys) and destroys the Galactor base.
23	"Love extinguished at the North Pole"; Transliteration: "Hokkyoku ni kie ta ai" (Japanese: 北極に消えた愛)	March 4, 1979
Big movements of the Earth's crust occur at the North Pole. Immediately thereafter, the adventurer Shimomura leaves Greenland on his way to the North Pole. He is reported missing on the third day of his voyage. By coincidence, he discovered a Galactor base and has been shot. When Ken learns that his teacher from school, Shimomura, is missing, he goes on a search mission to the North Pole together with the other members of the Science Ninja Team. However the God Phoenix cannot go all the way to the pole because of the influence of the magnetic field. During the search, Makku, Shimomura's beloved dog, has been discovered. He alone escaped the Galactor attack. Ken takes it with him and continues the search alone, not knowing that Shimomura is already dead. Makku leads Ken back to where Shimomura was shot. There, Ken also discovers the Galactor base. He tries to contact his teammates, but due to the magnetic field, he cannot get a connection. He then sneaks into the base and wants to destroy it, but Gel Sadra appears before him, cornering him with her troops. She then presses the launch button for missiles. In that moment, the rest of the Science Ninja Team appears. They have followed Ken, invaded the base and destroyed the launching mechanism. Together, they beat Galactor and blow up the base. On the outside, they find the dead body of Shimomura. Makku takes the body with him and disappears.
24	"G2 Under Suspicion"; Transliteration: "Giwaku no G2 gō" (Japanese: 疑惑のG2号)	March 11, 1979
Galactor releases test waves of the solarshifter. At the same time, in the city of Owari, accidents due to anomalities in the main computer keep happening, which provoke a panic. The Science Ninja Team goes to Owari in order to find out the reason for all this. But when they arrive in the city, Pimer and the New God Phoenix also cease to function properly. Galactor takes advantage of this opportunity and attacks with hang gliders. In order to return their attack, the Science Ninja Team leaves the God Phoenix, but Joe's condition is not good. Ryu returns to G-Town with the God Phoenix. Joe is not to be deterred though and starts his attack. However, the huge shield of electromagnetic waves around the solarshifter affect his cyborg body in a bad way. He gets into a critical situation and becomes unconscious. He is saved and treated by Dr. Raphael, who revives him. Even though Dr. Raphael warns Joe about the electromagnetic field, Joe does not want to let down his friends. He then sneaks into the Galactor base alone. However, the field affects him again, leaving him helpless. He cannot completely enter the center of the base and shoots a rocket through a closing door, thus provoking a major explosion. The God Phoenix, which just returned to the city from G-Town, sees the explosion and finishes off the base. Then they rescue Joe out of the sea.
25	"The Sad Cyborg"; Transliteration: "Kanashimi no saibōgu" (Japanese: 悲しみのサイボーグ)	March 18, 1979
A spaceship from Earth is suddenly attacked by meteorites, and the Science Ninja Team hurries to the bottom of the sea, to the spot where the meteorites fell. But there, mysterious robots that arrived a bit earlier, are already collecting the meteorites. Is it Galactor...?? Joe follows the robots and corners them, but they are not Galactor. On the contrary, they greet him as "brother". They are cyborgs as well who have been made by Dr. Raphael. A cyborg who introduces himself as Ulf leads him to their colony. There he meets Ulf's comrades, who are equally friendly, as well as Dr. Raphael. Then he learns that they want to invite him to a strength experiment. Before Joe's eyes, many cyborgs die when they are tested under extremely hard conditions. Then Joe is called by Ken and has to return to G-Town. Elsewhere, Galactor has noticed the existence of Ulf and the others. Using the meteorite's guidance system, they let meteorites fall onto the colony and destroy it. Joe sees this on the monitors of G-Town and hurries to the colony, meeting a dying Ulf. Then he goes to Dr. Raphael. The strength experiments of Ulf and the others were intended to make Joe's body stronger. Joe tells Dr. Raphael "I did it so far, but I don't want to become a perfect cyborg! I want to live as a human being!". Dr. Raphael answers: "Then listen, Joe! Your body has to absorb the result of their blood and sweat, you have to become stronger because of them!" Since his cyborg comrades have become victims, Joe honours their will and submits himself to an operation which transforms and strengthens him. Joe can now resist very high temperatures and stand high pressure. He can even use the pressure and heat as his own energy. Thus strengthened, Joe saves Ken from a Galactor base where Ken got shot down, trying to destroy it with his G-1.
26	"The Mysterious Secretary Pandora"; Transliteration: "Nazo no hisho pandora" (Japanese: 謎の秘書パンドラ)	March 25, 1979
The Science Ninja Team departs to pick up Dr. Pandora, who is supposed to become Dr. Nambu's secretary. In order to remain inconspicuous, they put Dr. Pandora and her car in a truck and head towards G-Town. Suddenly, Dr. Pandora tells them to leave the road. Despite getting suspicious, the group leaves the road and heads into the desert. Because of this, a Galactor ambush has been unsuccessful, and they then start to attack with airborne troops. The truck is destroyed, but the team manages to escape after a fierce fight in Pandora's car, which has been equipped with weapons and has been made bulletproof. Finally, they reach G-Town. Nambu takes Dr. Pandora with him and together they leave for Cape Long to investigate an incident at a factory for gaining Mantle energy. Joe is suspicious because of the smile Pandora left behind and because he learned that she's an expert in cyborg technology. Elsewhere, Governor X is impatient because of Gel Sadra's repeated failings and has prepared a weapon himself to terminate Dr. Nambu. It is a weapon into which Gel Sadra has to be in, then her superhuman brain waves are amplified and can be used as a weapon. After a few days, at G-Town, the message arrives that Nambu has been attacked and is badly hurt.
27	"Dr. Nambu dies!" Transliteration: "Nanbu hakase shisu!" (Japanese: 南部博士死す！)	April 1, 1979
The Science Ninja Team hurries to the hospital. When Dr. Pandora announces that she's giving the orders now, Joe tries to shoot her. Ken stops him. Because the person who shot Dr. Nambu is not known, Dr. Pandora then orders the team to investigate a certain spot from where specific brain waves are emanating. While the team is on its way there, they receive a message that Dr. Nambu has died. Joe still distrusts Dr. Pandora and returns to the hospital alone. The rest of the team wants to return too, but Ken tells them to obey Pandora's orders (and slaps Jun). They detect a Galactor base at their destination and sneak into it right away. Galactor has amplified Gel Sadra's special brain waves and has created a monster which is about to attack Dr. Nambu. Pandora has foreseen that and has put Dr. Nambu in a state of suspended animation (by shooting him), thus resisting the monster's brain wave radar. Joe has punched Pandora, but when she tells him what was really going on, Joe resists Gel Sadra with his own brain waves. With the brain waves, he creates a figure of his own and defeats Gel Sadra - just before the team finds her in the Galactor base. Clarifying the whole affair, Pandora is no longer a suspect. But she finishes telling Ken and the others that Joe is a cyborg.
28	"Love Stolen by a Feather Shuriken"; Transliteration: "Ai wo ubatta hane shuriken" (Japanese: 愛を奪った羽根手裏剣)	April 8, 1979
In the city, Joe is attacked by a female biker. She says "ask the feather shuriken, why this happened" and escapes. Later, upon Dr. Nambu's order, Joe moves out with his comrades to investigate the defeat of the secret tank forces of the international defense army. But in the middle of the investigation, the woman appears in front of Joe again. She is Mako, the fiancée of Hawkgetz, who was supposed to become G-2. Mako firmly believes that Joe killed Getz because Galactor has told her so. She misunderstood that Joe has killed an imposter posing as Getz. Galactor had actually killed Getz. Joe tells Mako what really happened. He gives her a pendant that he got from the real Getz, just before his death, with instructions to hand it over to Mako. Then Joe leaves to bury the Galactor subordinate who used Mako as a means to assassinate him. Meanwhile, the rest of the team has taken care of the underground Galactor fortress. Jinpei was shot down, but not hurt. While searching for him, Jun has discovered an entrance to the base, gone in, and destroyed the base almost singlehandedly. After everything is over, Joe and Mako rejoin the rest of the team.
29	"Life or Death! The Evil North Wall"; Transliteration: "Ika shi ka! ma no hokuheki" (Japanese: 生か死か！ 魔の北壁)	April 15, 1979
Galactor has built a base on the mountain K3 which is located in the Himalayas. From there, a magma mega cannon shoots through the Earth and attacks cities all over the world. The only way to penetrate the base is through the North Wall, which is impossible to climb however, because it's 3,000 meters high and vertical. Suffering under the fact that he has a cyborg body, Joe is about to despair, and takes over this dangerous task when Nambu orders it. Ken is not happy about this, the Science Ninja Team has always been a team after all! That Joe is a cyborg and can handle things on his own is no reason to send him alone. Joe however coldly refuses when Ken and the others offer to accompany him. Jun follows Joe and he finally accepts her company. But because of Jun's carelessness, Galactor notices them and the two of them are swallowed by an artificial avalanche. Additionally, they can't move because of the cold. They are surrounded by the enemy, and don't know what to do anymore. Ken, Jinpei and Ryu run to their aid. Through the actions of Ken and the others, the magma mega cannon is destroyed. With the warm friendship of his comrades, Joe has been freed from his pain.
30	"Ryu Has Returned to His Hometown"; Transliteration: "Kokyō ni kaetta ryū" (Japanese: 故郷に帰った竜)	April 22, 1979
Because his father is hurt, Ryu gets into the Horned Tank and goes back to his native fishing-village. However, in the sea around the village, Galactor plans to destroy a gas chamber and let the land sink into the sea. When Gel Sadra sees the G-5 heading towards the village, she thinks that the Science Ninja Team got wind of her plan. Ryu has indeed noticed some strange bubbles and Nambu tells him that he will send the God Phoenix to investigate. Gel Sadra charges two assassins with infiltrating the village and aiming at Ryu. Opposing the attacking Galactor, Ryu pretends to be weak and gets out of the difficult situation because the assassins start to doubt whether he really is a member of the Science Ninja Team. However, shortly thereafter, his father and younger brother are abducted by Galactor. Ryu follows them and finds out that a petroleum tanker at sea is actually the Galactor base. In order to save his family, Ryu sneaks into the base. But when they are used as shields, Ryu gets into a difficult situation again. When his father refuses to serve as bait, Ryu gets tears in his eyes. But before Gel Sadra can force Ryu to reveal himself, the Science Ninja Team's submarine breaks into the base. Ken and the others have detected the gas chambers, and thereafter the base, and come charging in. With their help, Ryu is able to save his family. But they know now that he's a member of the Science Ninja Team.
31	"The Eagle is Shot Down"; Transliteration: "Gekitsui sareta dai washi" (Japanese: 撃墜された大鷲)	April 29, 1979
In G-Town, the G-1 has been altered in order to reduce its mach resistance and enter the atmosphere more smoothly. Ken boards the G-1 immediately and goes out on a test flight. But he enjoys the flight so much that he doesn't pay enough attention and is shot down when he accidentally gets near a secret Galactor base. Ken somehow manages to make a forced landing, but his bracelet is damaged and he can neither establish a connection nor transform. Furthermore, he is also hurt. Fortunately, a native boy, Peter, saves him. Peter and his older sister tend to Ken's wounds and hide him in an old barn. Ken attaches a transmitter to a carrier pigeon he finds there and lets it fly into the sky. Elsewhere, Peter and his older sister are captured by Galactor members and end up tied to a tree. Joe and the others have caught Ken's radio signal and come in a hurry. They save Peter and his sister just in time. After being reunited with his comrades, Ken attacks the secret base in the valley with the God Phoenix. Consequently, the base is destroyed. Gel Sadra flees, leaving her subordinates behind.
32	"G1 - Love in the Andes"; Transliteration: "G1 gō andesu no ai" (Japanese: G1号アンデスの愛)	May 6, 1979
The information arrives that there's a secret Galactor base in the Andes. Ken and Ryu go to the Andes in disguise in order to contact the intelligence member Yupanki. However, Galactor makes them drink some medicine, whereupon they lose their memory, forgetting their task and their names. The wandering Ken meets a dying man who says he has been hired by another man named Yupanki. The man entrusts him with a silver coin, as Yupanki told him to do. Without remembering Yupanki's name, Ken follows the man's last will and gives the coin to the man's daughter Kena. As it is, Ken decides to settle in that Indian village, living together with Kena, and falling in love with her. Meanwhile, Joe and the others discover Ryu who also lost his memory, and find out what antidote would help. Ken is at the same time fortunately stung by an Inca-Scorpion. Its poison is the aforementioned antidote and it negates the effect of the medicin. Ken regains his memory. Then, based on the sketch glued to the silver coin, they detect the enemy base hidden in some ruins and destroy it. But for Ken, it's a sad good-bye from Kena.
33	"Angry G-1"; Transliteration: "Ikari no G1 gō" (Japanese: 怒りのG1号)	May 13, 1979
A big earthquake suddenly happens in New Joke. But the inhabitants are not the only ones who are shocked - so is Gel Sadra. She never gave this order! This operation has been undertaken by the Galactor commander Panther. He convinces Gel Sadra to participate in the operation, thus showing Governor X her strength. The Science Ninja Team goes to investigate and detects a missile base in a huge underground, public hall. Galactor has shot a missile into a gas chamber and thus created the earthquake. At that moment, the missile that Joe, Jun and Ryu discovered is launched, causing another earthquake. It also causes the hall to collapse and Joe, Jun and Jinpei are locked in. Under Nambu's order, Ken and Jinpei leave for Rodo Island to stop the guidance waves of the missiles, even if they don't like leaving their comrades behind. But the attacked Galactor base rises into the sky! The base is the huge mecha Mechasatan. Ken invades the mecha from its lower part, where the ray mounted at top of the mecha can't protect it. At the end of a fight for life or death with Panther, Ken succeeds in destroying the transmitter that is sending the guidance waves by throwing Panther into the mechanism. Gel Sadra throws herself at Governor X's feet.
34	"The Evil Mecha from the Amazon"; Transliteration: "Amazon no tetsu majū" (Japanese: アマゾンの鉄魔獣)	May 20, 1979
In a Galactor base at an upper course of the Amazon, a new weapon using Hypertonium is produced. The base is protected by the mechanical plants which surround it and push back any invader. Jinpei is investigating the area around the river when somebody attacks him and shoots him down. He is saved from the piranhas in the river by some local children. The team rejoins him and brings back the Helicopter and the bracelet Jinpei lost during his escape. Jinpei is ordered to remain on standby while the team searches the Amazonas. However, Jinpei somehow ends up in the difficult situation of going with the children into the interior of the Amazonas in order to pick up a legendary, blooming blue orchid. They detect Galactor troops, secretly follow them, and discover a Hypertonium transport vessel. However, Jinpei and the children are discovered and captured. But Ken and the others have fought their way through the mechanical jungle, hurry to their rescue and save them in the nick of time, before Gel Sadra can let them fall into the Piranhas in the river. The huge mecha Kuskard then starts to move. It attacks the New God Phoenix and causes it to crash. But because the Hypertonium is unstable, Kuskard self-destructs in the end.
35	"Berg Katse's Inheritance"; Transliteration: "Berukukattse no isan" (Japanese: ベルクカッツェの遺産)	May 27, 1979
Joe saves the son of Kaiser from an approaching car and becomes his friend. Together they play soccer while Kaiser draws Joe. But Kaiser is a former Galactor member and the only one who can handle a weapon Berg Katse has left behind. It's a weapon called Mechavolton which was built to destroy the greatest obstacle for Galactor's highflying ambitions, the Firebird. Kaiser, a.k.a. No. A-7, was thought to have died in the battle of Cross Karakorum and has led a peaceful life since then. But when Galactor threatens to kill his wife and son, he works together with them again. As a diversion, the Iron Bat attacks a city. The God Phoenix goes out to attack the Bat, but is wrapped in ice through a freezer gas. With the help of the Firebird they escape from the predicament for a short while and destroy the Iron Bat, but when Kaiser fires the Mechavolton, they are finally shot down. The Science Ninja Team escapes by a hair's breadth and invades the enemy base. But Kaiser blocks their way. Joe however defeats him in battle, but does not kill him. Kaiser activates the self-destruct mechanism. Joe punches him and carries him outside the base. "Why did you help me? Women and children were.. " "I also used to be a son of Galactor" answers Joe.
36	"The Sad Underground City"; Transliteration: "Kanashimi no chitei toshi" (Japanese: 悲しみの地底都市)	June 3, 1979
In an underground ISO city in Siberia that uses mantel energy, a huge explosion takes place which results in a high level of radioactivity. Causing this has been Megatonra, a monster which has been brought from space by Governor X and which grows by absorbing radioactivity. Megatonra has been put under the Earth by Gel Sadra where it has been eating radioactive waste and has grown considerably. Then it has started to destroy the underground city. Dr. Horin is the husband of Mary, the architect of the city, that died in an accident. Ken goes with him to investigate the underground city. But Mark, the son of Dr. Horin, has secretly sneaked in the expedition car. Mark hates the underground city because it took away his mother and he intends to destroy it. The monster appears and destroys the Mark Park, which Mary left behind for her son. When Mark sees this, he flies away in the expedition car in order to protect the underground city constructed by his mother. The monster then perishes in the combined attack of Mark and the God Phoenix which hurried to their side.
37	"Burn, Iron Wings!"; Transliteration: "Moe ro! haganeno tsubasa" (Japanese: 燃えろ！ はがねの翼)	June 10, 1979
Jinpei has left to bring a detector to a secret ISO research institute in the Rakki mountain chain. When he is almost there, an earthquake hits. Jinpei sees a young orphaned puma and does not bring the detector to the institute. However, that institute is destroyed by the unusual earthquake. After Jinpei returns, he gets rebuked by Joe and Ken because he took care of the puma. Then it becomes known that there was poisonous Sarin gas in the research institute which now threatens to leak out. Joe and Ryu go to investigate, while Ken and the others are supposed to follow with a neutralizer. But another earthquake occurs and the two men are imprisoned below the research institute. Jinpei has heard the news, and leaving Ken and the others, goes alone again to the Rakki mountain chain. Not relenting, he returns the puma to nature. Jinpei arrives at the ruins of the research institute, kicks out Galactor who wanted to build a base there, and then continues to save Joe and Ryu. On their way out of the institute though, the Horned Tank Jinpei uses turns over, and Sarin gas enters. Gel Sadra escapes and laughs at their accident. But the God Phoenix arrives, and the poisonous gas which has started to leak out is rendered harmless by the neutralizer brought by the Phoenix. When Jun tells Jinpei "Well done", he answers "Jun...". Hasn't Jinpei always said "older sister"? Joe also notices that Jinpei has grown up.
38	"The Electromagnetic Mecha Iron Devil Dragon"; Transliteration: "Denji meka tetsu ma ryū" (Japanese: 電磁メカ鉄魔竜)	June 17, 1979
Dragon Island, where once upon a time a dragon was supposed to have shown itself. Again an informant disappears who has been visiting and investigating this island. Is something there? Nambu thinks so, and according to his orders, the Science Ninja Team is mobilized. Before them appears the Iron Devil Dragon from Galactor. The God Phoenix is hit by an electromagnetic light ray and its electrical systems are jammed. They are forced to return home for the moment. Concluding that it's impossible to attack head-on, Joe sneaks alone into Dragon Island. Pandora drives him there. Inside the Galactor base, Joe discovers a huge beam cannon pointing at the sun. In the meantime, Dr. Pandora has sneaked into the base on her own and has been captured. Joe sees her when she is brought before Gel Sadra, who is in the dragon. When meeting her, Gel Sadra says "You! It's as if I have met you before...". The dragon takes off, but Joe is already on board, after having set the base to blow. Joe rescues Dr. Pandora and together they destroy the generator for the electromagnetic waves. The Dragon can't use its electromagnetic waves now and the God Phoenix destroys it with its missiles.
39	"The Purple Condor"; Transliteration: "Niji no kondoru" (Japanese: 紅のコンドル)	June 24, 1979
Nuclear experiments have taken place in the Straits of Gibraltar. The experiments are for the development of a new energy by Galactor. Nambu sends the Science Ninja Team to that spot. But, the God Phoenix is caught in another nuclear explosion and disappears. Joe had previously left by himself in the G-2 to investigate, and the shock of the explosion causes him to lose energy. He sneaks into territory under Galactor control. Gel Sadra puts a reward on his head and does everything within her power to find Joe. A gypsy, Chinita, who has experienced Galactor's cruelty before, shelters Joe so he can overcome the difficult situation. Chinita's lover is jealous and threatens Joe. In an attempt to kill Joe, he hurts Chinita. Joe takes care of her. However, the lover alerts Galactor and Chinita is caught. Based on a clue left by Chinita, Joe finds the Galactor base. Elsewhere, in the sea near North Africa, G-Town has come to collect the sunken God Phoenix. Ken and the others are rescued and are treated for their injuries. Soon, through a message from Joe, the rest of the team finds the base and arrives just in time to get Joe out of a trap. They put a stop to Gel Sadra's ambitions, but they can't rescue Chinita because Gel Sadra blows up the base.
40	"Fight hard! The Devilish Animal Operation"; Transliteration: "Gekitō! ma no animaru sakusen" (Japanese: 激斗！ 魔のアニマル作戦)	July 1, 1979
Dr. Pandora conducts an experiment for a machine which enables humans to communicate with animals. The Science Ninja Team spends some peaceful time at a national park with animals and children, at least until Galactor attacks. While they are protecting the children participating in this experiment, Joe gets a message from Dr. Raphael that Governor X is in the Kongal Plateau in Agrica and has begun his ultimate plan. Joe decides to leave on his own to investigate, but he is captured. In a base below the Kongal Plateau, a main beam cannon for the Solarshifter plan has been constructed. Besides, Jun and Jinpei are captured as well while looking for Joe, and are led away by the enemy. When the animals report to Dr. Pandora that there has been human bloodthirst found in an area in the middle of their homeland, where no humans are allowed, she and the animals rush there. A huge elephant herd crashed into the base. Joe and the others corner Gel Sadra and approach Governor X. Gel Sadra gets beside herself and Governor X tells her to activate the switch of the main beam cannon. The cannon starts to blink and explodes. "Take me with you please, Governor..!!" says Gel Sadra and her figure dissolves in the middle of a bright light. Without a chance against Governor X's mysterious power, the team has to let him escape. Ken says to an angry Joe: "How many times do I have to tell you that I don't allow you acting all alone!", "Sorry.." answers Joe, but he murmurs to himself "I am the one to vanquish Governor X. There's no reason that you, my friends, sacrifice yourself for it".
41	"Gatchaman Against Gel Sadra"; Transliteration: "Gacchaman tsui gerusadora" (Japanese: ガッチャマン対ゲルサドラ)	July 8, 1979
Gel Sadra builds a beam cannon in a secret base. Governor X sends the main component by subterranean rocket from his headquarters to Gel Sadra's base. But the rocket goes out of control when it collides with a crack in the Earth's crust and heads the surface... Gel Sadra is about to collect the main component and destroy the rocket in order to maintain the secret, but through an accident with the explosives, she is left all alone. Elsewhere, the Science Ninja Team has noticed the rocket through a satellite, and hurries towards the spot of the accident. The Science Ninja Team investigates the surroundings. Ken follows some mysterious footprints and unexpectedly runs into Gel Sadra. The transmitter is not working and Ken is forced to act alone. A fight ensues between Ken and Gel Sadra, where both depend only on their bare hands. Ken follows the fleeing Gel Sadra and, as a consequence, finally arrives at the enemy base. However, he is surrounded by the enemy. The other team members hurry there. They destroy the secret factory with the tornado fighter. While returning, Jinpei accidentally collects the main component that Gel Sadra possessed before. The day when the riddle of the main beam cannons will be solved is not far away anymore.
42	"The Observatory Moving in the Darkness"; Transliteration: "Yamini ugoku tenmondai" (Japanese: 闇に動く天文台)	July 15, 1979
Richman the Second gets the international scientific peace prize for the development of a solar telescope. Dr. Pandora has come to the inauguration party as Dr. Nambu's companion. She feels a strange sensation from Richman (Gel Sadra), like she has never experienced before. Dr. Pandora is suspicious and sneaks into Richman's heavily guarded observatory in the middle of the night. By coincidence, she also finds a Galactor base with a main beam cannon. She takes pictures of top secret documents with a miniature camera and relates to Nambu that the observatory is a dummy. However, she ends up getting caught there. Richman points his gun at Dr. Pandora, but he is attacked by a strange painful feeling and hesitates. In reality, Richman is Gel Sadra. Ken and the others rescue Dr. Pandora and get into the God Phoenix, but then Mechaflasher of Galactor comes charging in. The Science Ninja Team, with Dr. Pandora on board, dares to go to the Firebird and is victorious. Mechaflasher is destroyed and as a consequence, the base also collapses. From the analysis of the microfilm, it is found that Galactor is planning to use the sun. But it is still a mystery why Dr. Pandora feels this strange sensation when she sees Gel Sadra.
43	"Invaders from Mars"; Transliteration: "Kasei karano inbeda" (Japanese: 火星からのインベーダー)	July 22, 1979
While investigating Mars, an Earth satellite is blown up, and a second space base on Solkila Island is destroyed as well. But the culprit is not Gel Sadra. She faces the fact the Governor X praised the destruction of the first base as a hint. She assures that she can do this as well and goes out to do so. When a third space base is about to be annihilated, the Science Ninja Team goes out to help. But the New God Phoenix has to make an emergency landing because it's attacked by a mysterious UFO. The base is destroyed and Gel Sadra arrives too late to do it herself. The Science Ninja Team goes to protect the fourth space base which is working on launching an unmanned exploration probe to Mars. Just after the launch, the UFO attacks again. The probe is destroyed. What is there on Mars?! Without pausing, the UFO goes on to attack the fourth space base. The G-Mechas fight back and through their intervention, the UFO disappears somewhere. The owner of the UFO is Marstora. He is a subordinate of Governor X and has been building the solarshifter bases on Mars so far. Gel Sadra reports to Governor X that a strong opponent has emerged. He answers that it's actually his subordinate Marstora, who has been ordered to destroy Earth's Mars bases and build Galactor's base on Mars. What are the true aims of Governor X, who has reached space wide dimensions now?
44	"Strike! Evil Mars Base"; Transliteration: "Tatake! jaaku no kasei kichi" (Japanese: たたけ！ 邪悪の火星基地)	July 29, 1979
Unusual weather conditions are occurring because of natural disasters on the sun. Dr. Nambu suspects that this is a test of Galactor's solarshifter plan. In fact, its only the first test stage of that plan. The solarshifter plan is a terrible operation which looks to use the solarshifter bases on the Mars, Venus and Earth to move the sun. When the main beam cannon on Venus and Earth are completed, it will become horrible. The Science Ninja Team moves out to attack from two sides, on Earth and on Mars. Ken goes in the Orbiter G towards Mars, while the other team members investigate the Brajila zone. But the mission on Earth ends in failure. The fate of the Earth remains on the shoulders of Eagle Ken. When Ken arrives on Mars, Marstora starts a counterattack. During the fight, Ken discovers the enemy base and attacks it with a missile, to no avail though. Is there another possibility to strike?! Suddenly Ken has an idea and separates a part of the Orbiter G and launches it at the base. The base is destroyed and Earth is saved. But Ken loses control of the orbiter and becomes shipwrecked in space. And the unusual weather on Earth continues.
45	"The Devilish Solarshifter Plan"; Transliteration: "Ma no sōrashifuto keikaku" (Japanese: 魔のソーラーシフト計画)	August 5, 1979
Through Ken's death defying attack, the Mars base has been destroyed. But Governor X does not want to give up on the Solarshifter plan and orders Marstora to repair the base within three days. "In three days, Mars, Venus and Earth will become a triangle and fire at the same time. The base on Earth is already completed!" Elsewhere, Ken's orbiter only has oxygen enough left for two days. Without Dr. Nambu's permission, Joe gets into a rescue rocket in order to save Eagle Ken, who is drifting in space. Even when the radio signal from Ken stops, Joe continues searching and finally discovers the Orbiter G. But at that moment, Joe becomes blinded since he used a night sight device with infrared rays. And around this time, the main beam cannon on Earth fires at the sun and raises its temperature. The world turns into a red hot environment. Jun and the others have discovered the headquarters of the main beam cannon in Brajila, but they fail in their attack with the New God Phoenix. Ken has been informed about the position of the cannon and after putting a protesting Joe in the escape pod and jumping out himself, he lets the rescue rocket collide with the base. The main beam cannon explodes. The Science Ninja Team has also temporarily halted the Galactor plan.
46	"Gatchaman unmasked" Transliteration: "Abakareta gacchaman" (Japanese: あばかれたガッチャマン)	August 12, 1979
The ISO and the UN have developed a special radar to search for the main beam cannon. But Galactor learns about this, and during one of their attacks, Chief Anderson is badly hurt. Gel Sadra wants to reveal the true face of Gatchaman. Since he doesn't know what he looks like, he starts attacking one employee of the ISO after the other. Ken feels sorry about all the victims. Meanwhile Sam, the grandson of Chief Anderson, is captured. In order to avenge his grandfather, he pretends to be Gatchaman and is tortured mercilessly. Ken has secretly sneaked into the base as a Galactor member. However, Gel Sadra notices the unknown trooper and has him unmasked, thus revealing his true identity. Ken goes into bird style, rescues Sam and charges at Gel Sadra. He flees, leaving behind the menacing words "Stupid Gatchaman! I have now seen your true face, the next time I will win for sure!" The enemy base becomes the Mecha Sentango and starts creating havoc. The two men escape from the ammunition depot and are picked up by the New God Phoenix. Through an attack by the Eagle Sharp, Sentango explodes. But the enemy now knows that Ken is a member of the Science Ninja Team. Will there be a tomorrow for him?
47	"Kill for Sure! The Two Firebirds"; Transliteration: "Hissatsu! niwa no hinotori" (Japanese: 必殺！ 二羽の火の鳥)	August 26, 1979
Because of the Solarshifter plan and the consequently unusual weather, icebergs break out one after the other at the North Pole. In order to stop a huge iceberg, G-Town goes to Sanbur City in the country Aberika. When Dr. Pandora goes out for a meeting, the Galactor ninja group Galakon sneaks into G-Town instead of her. Through the actions of the Ninja Team, the enemy is completely defeated, but the propulsion system is destroyed and G-Town goes out of control. It falls into a deep sea trench and above it, a huge iceberg starts to cover the trench, making it impossible to exit G-Town. It's Gel Sadra's Seafang plan. The communication network is also destroyed, and the only hope is Dr. Pandora. She gets into the old God Phoenix which is located at Nambu's villa. Straining her untrained body, she melts the iceberg with the Firebird. But Gel Sadra attacks and Pandora gets into a critical situation! Saving her is the Firebird of the New God Phoenix, which was now able to exit G-Town. Then, in the dark blue sky, the two firebirds, the old one and the new one, beat their wings.
48	"The Biggest Tidal Wave in History"; Transliteration: "Shijōsaidai no tsunami" (Japanese: 史上最大の大津波)	September 2, 1979
One disaster after the other occurs all over the Earth. In order to help and to understand the situation, the ISO travels from one location to the other. But that center for peace is finally occupied by Galactor as well. Gel Sadra addresses the whole world and publicly declares world supremacy. Gel Sadra then interrogates Dr. Nambu in the data chamber, in order to learn the location of the special radar which was developed to find the main beam cannon. But they are completely surprised by the onslaught of the tidal wave. Dr. Pandora takes advantage of this and points her gun at Gel Sadra right away. Just then the two of them experience this strange feeling again. The enemy leaves the data chamber. Nambu goes to the airtight project chamber in order to take the special radar with him. Elsewhere, Gel Sadra uses that strange feeling and goes in search of the radar, finally discovering it. Just when he is about to take possession of the radar, the Science Ninja Team arrives. They barely manage to defend the radar, but the center of peace, the ISO building, finishes collapsing.
49	"Burn, Condor!"; Transliteration: "Moe yo! kondoru" (Japanese: 燃えよ！ コンドル)	September 9, 1979
The persons Governor X fears most are G-2, Condor Joe, and Dr. Raphael. Before his plan can be realized, those two have to be eliminated. Galactor chooses Joe before his transformation as a target. Joe pushes back the persistent attack of the Galakon team, but he loses his bracelet in the end. The Science Ninja Team goes looking for Joe. Joe has lost energy and charters a plane to go to the Island Ebiza where he can charge up, but Galactor has made the charterer attach a transmitter to the plane. They follow Joe and are already waiting when he gets there. Joe manages to defeat them, but the research institute is destroyed. Joe cannot charge up anymore! The wounded and energy-lacking Joe searches for Dr. Raphael who was not in the institute. Has Dr. Raphael at long last found out Governor X's secret?! But he is attacked by the enemy and is hurt. He contacts the Science Ninja Team and they comes rushing to help him. Just after Ken meets him, one of the enemy's shots goes into Raphael's heart! Before dying, he leaves behind the mysterious words "In the meteorite mountain... Only Joe can defeat Governor X...". Joe wants to beat up his killer, but Ken punches him and stops him. What is the secret Joe is keeping?
50	"Mystery! Mystery? Gel Sadra's Mother"; Transliteration: "Nazo! nazo? gerusadora no haha" (Japanese: 謎! 謎? ゲルサドラの母)	September 16, 1978
Since he has no childhood memories, Gel Sadra wonders about her own past and goes to ask Governor X. He answers "This goes without saying. You have been grown in a growth machine in an instant. That's why you don't have a childhood. You have been aboard a luxury ship with your mother, who surely died when the ship was sunk. No, even if she were alive, she wouldn't believe that you were her daughter. For her, you are the conqueror of Earth. Don't think those useless thoughts!" However, Gel Sadra goes looking through the passenger list of that ship, searching her mother's name and soon learns the shocking truth. She is Pandora's daughter!! X uses this fact and invites Pandora to the base. He had promised to Gel Sadra that, if Pandora joined Galactor, she could be reunited with her mother. At the same time, the Science Ninja Team discovers that base as well. Mother and daughter accomplish a moving reunion. Pandora lapses into mourning after learning the truth. She thinks that the deeds of her daughter are not for the conquest of Earth, but for Earth's destruction. She rejects Gel Sadra and rebukes her for lying, saying that her true daughter, Sammie, would never join Galactor. Governor X interrupts. The Science Ninja team has sneaked in. While fighting the team, Gel Sadra is worried about the well-being of her mother and goes back, shouting "Mother!". The team is astonished. However, Gel Sadra learns that Governor X has put Pandora in a rocket, has launched it, letting it self-destruct high up in the sky. For the first time, Gel Sadra doubts Governor X. Human emotions like anger and grief dwell in her heart again.
51	"Sad Gel Sadra"; Transliteration: "Kanashimi no gerusadora" (Japanese: 悲しみのゲルサドラ)	September 23, 1978
Gel Sadra views pictures of her family and cries. Elsewhere, the team is sad about the loss of Dr. Pandora. They soon learn why Pandora's daughter, Sammie, was taken by Governor X and mutated into Gel Sadra due to her unlimited cells. Joe's energy is diminishing. Because Dr. Nambu knows techniques to replenish energy, he examines Joe's body and discovers a bomb built into him, which is supposed to destroy Governor X. This is the reason why Dr. Raphael said that only Joe can defeat Governor X. The Science Ninja Team moves out, leaving Joe behind, even if he doesn't like it. Elsewhere, Joe secretly leaves G-Town and goes to the enemy base alone. But he crashes on the way there because he runs out of energy. Dr. Nambu contacts the team and tells them about the bomb in Joe's body. The Science Ninja Team discovers the main beam cannon, but is forced into a hard fight with the defense mecha. At that time, Gel Sadra learns the true aim of the Solarshifter Plan and becomes crazy. Meanwhile, the main beam cannon has been prepared to fire. The energy of the beam cannons, at their different locations is focused and concentrated at the main beam cannon. Countdown 2..1..0.. But it doesn't fire? Governor X is baffled. The reason is that Gel Sadra has destroyed the mechanism and berated him for the death of her mother. Gel Sadra escapes. The Science Ninja Team has destroyed the enemy mecha and follows her.
52	"The Downfall of Governor X"; Transliteration: "Sōsai X no metsubō" (Japanese: 総裁Xの滅亡)	September 30, 1979
The Solarshifter plan is progressing very well in its Solar System-wide scale, and unusual phenomena keep occurring everywhere. Gel Sadra is being pursued and wounded by Galactor. Her ship crashes, but Ken finds her. Joe joins them, and then punches Ken out. Joe has recharged his energy at a power plant. He goes along with Gel Sadra towards the headquarters of Governor X and confronts him. Meanwhile, Ken has found some spots of blood on the snow. Reunited with the rest of the Science Ninja Team, they sneak into the enemy's base. Ken leaves Jun and the others to fight against Galactor, while he hurries towards the location of Governor X. There, he finds Joe and Gel Sadra, both collapsed. The three of them approach Governor X, but there's no way to go past the overwhelming power. Gel Sadra tells Gatchaman that Governor X's weak point is the destruction of his central mechanism, and she opens the hatch leading there. He is then hit again by a beam of energy from Governor X. Joe and Ken's death-defying attack finishes off the fight, and Governor X and the base finally end in a big explosion. Was it Joe that caused it? Is he still alive? Ken's Bird Saucer had stopped X's functions in one hit, and Joe is still there. Gel Sadra is hurt and weakened. When she cries at the Earth's beauty, she hears Pandora's voice from the sky reassuring her that as long Gatchaman is around, the Earth will remain beautiful. Gel Sadra dies and goes to his deceased mother. Her body shrinks and gradually takes on the form of Dr. Pandora's daughter, Sammie. Through the sacrifice of mother and daughter, the Earth has been saved. But has Governor X really been destroyed ? No one notices the terrible, red glowing thing in the middle of the debris of the exploded mecha.
