= List of Gatchaman Fighter episodes =

This article is a list of episodes from the television show Gatchaman Fighter in order by production number.

== Episodes ==
No.	Title	Original release date
1	"New Dark Clouds"; Transliteration: "Aratanaru An'un" (Japanese: 新たなる暗雲)	October 7, 1979
Weeks after the dust settles from Sosai X's destruction, a tiny fragment of the alien revives and begins to rebuild itself into Leader Zed. Using the remains of an old shipyard, Zed builds a vast mechanical pyramid fortress and levitates it over the ocean. Meanwhile, the rest of the world quits rebuilding from the wreckage of the thwarted Solar Shift Plan and go back to what they do best: waging war. We meet Count Egobossler, successful ruler of a growing number of territories, and an aspiring megalomaniac. Egobossler meets Sosai Zed, who decides to use Egobossler's brilliant military tactics to his own advantage, and the two strike a deal. In the wake of Chief Anderson's death in Gatchaman II, Nambu is promoted to Chief Administrator of the ISO. The Kagaku Ninjatai cope with the unusual peace. Feeling useless during peacetime, Joe wallows in boredom and self pity while Nambu tries to find a way to recharge him after his near-destruction in G-II.
2	"Debut! Gatcha Spartan"; Transliteration: "Tōjō! Gatcha・Suparutan" (Japanese: 登場! ガッチャ・スパルタン)	October 14, 1979
Egobossler's first attack, backed up by one of Zed's giant mechs, completely startles out heroes. Ken, Jun, Jinpei and Ryu rush to the scene of the battle (leaving Joe behind to quietly expire). The mech is too powerful, and the New Godphoenix is completely trashed in the first skirmish with Egobossler. Fortunately, Chief Engineer Saburo Kamo is waiting in the wings with brand new mechs. With only one problem: the new vehicles need five operators to combine. It's up to Joe, who upon hearing the phrase, "Gallactor has returned," will crawl on his final strength to rejoin the team. The Gatchaspartan saves the day.
3	"A Tainted Oasis"; Transliteration: "Yogosare Oashizu" (Japanese: 汚されたオアシス)	October 21, 1979
While on their trek of conquering Europe, Galactor invades a mountain village to take water from their oasis and Gatchaman flies out to intervene. The team plan to blow up the oasis so Galactor won't have anymore water. Ken and Jun go to plant the explosives and are nearly caught by a Galactor patrol but are saved by an old man. The man, who is the village's mayor, objects to their plan to blow up the oasis and shows them the trapped villagers. Ken says they need to get the villagers out before destroying the oasis but the villagers want to keep submitting to Galactor. Ken and Jun sneak into the Galactor camp and use half their explosives to destroy their supply trucks and tanks. When Kempler reports the situation to Egobossler, the count gives him command of the Wrestler Commandos. The villagers celebrate their freedom but Gatchaman still plan to blow up the oasis, as they know Galactor will be back. The mayor says he'll fight and Ken agrees to help him but the villagers refuse to. Galactor returns and the Wrestler Commandos attack, overpowering the team. However, Jun realizes that their weaknesses are their eyes and uses this to defeat them. The mayor charges at Kempler, who shoots him repeatedly. This convinces the villagers to take up arms and march towards Galactor. Ken joins them and the rest of the team follow in their mechs and destroy Galactor's tanks. Kempler and the remaining tanks retreat. Ken says that Galactor will never again get the oasis and even if they return, the villagers will fight back, with help from the national army.
4	"The Challenge of the Iron Commandos"; Transliteration: "Aian Komando no Chōsen" (Japanese: アイアンコマンドの挑戦)	October 28, 1979
The island of Paron is taken over by Galactor and Dr. Nambu informs Gatchaman of this, as well as a little information ISO has about Egobossler. The team heads to Paron Island but are forced to retreat when Kempler threatens to kill hostages. Ken goes to infiltrate the island alone and is ambushed by Galactor's newest soldiers, the Iron Commandos. Unable to injure them due to their armor, Ken is sent off a cliff by them and Kempler. Galactor celebrates conquering Paron and seemingly killing Ken but he appears from a cake, accompanied by the rest of the team. Egobossler sics a mecha on them and they form the GatchaSpartan. They destroy the mecha and Galactor leaves.
5	"Charge! The Terrible Soldiers"; Transliteration: "Totsugeki! Wanpaku Senshi" (Japanese: 突撃!わんぱく戦士)	November 4, 1979
Refugees flee from Egobossler's army as the count tells Kempler that he is dissatisfied with their munitions production but Kempler says he has a plan to acquire the manpower for it. Meanwhile, Gatchaman escorts a Red Cross ship heading to save the refugees but it is attacked by a mecha. Gatchaman fight it, but the mecha is a distraction for Kempler, who uses the Wrestler Commandos to capture the refugees and make them slaves. The mecha destroys the Red Cross ship and the team form the GatchaSpartan but the mecha sinks underwater and releases mines. Knowing Gatchaman can't attack without blowing up the mines and harming the refugees, Kempler tells them they'll be making munitions for the rest of their lives. Ken tells the others to pretend to retreat so they can sneak into town. He, Joe, Jun and Jinpei scuba dive over while Ryu stays behind. On land, the four of them meet three refugee boys who rebuke them for their earlier failure. Overhearing Gatchaman's plan to rescue the refugees, the boys head off to do it themselves. Gatchaman helps them through the minefield but ties them up once they get to shore. The team infiltrates the castle and releases the prisoners as the boys free themselves. They then find a secret tunnel into Kempler's throne room and are caught but their homemade bomb isn't noticed. Before Kempler can shoot them, Gatchaman and the refugees burst in. At that moment, the bomb goes off and Kempler flees. Gatchaman pursues him but he jumps into the mecha. Ken calls Ryu, who brings the GatchaSpartan, and destroy the mecha after a brief battle, though Kempler escapes. The next day, another Red Cross ship arrives.
6	"Burn! Gatchaman Fencer"; Transliteration: "Moeru! G Fensā" (Japanese: 燃えろ!Gフェンサー)	November 11, 1979
Ken is frustrated at how Galactor is expanding the battlefront and that they should attack Egobossler at their main base at Satanhofen. The others tell Ken how well defended the castle is but Ken is adamant and they agree to go. The team take off in their mechas and form the GatchaSpartan, fighting through a squadron of jets. Kempler reports Gatchaman's invasion to Egobossler, who laughs that they've underestimated him. As Gatchaman approach the castle, Leader Z reveals himself and produces a mecha to fight them but they destroy it. However, the mecha shoots GatchaSpartan with a missile before it's downed. Ken tells Ryu to aim for the castle but its defenses open fire on them and they crash land to find themselves surrounded by Galactor soldiers. The team easily defeats them and Kempler sends in the Wrestler Commandos who are likewise defeated. Kempler then sends in the Iron Commandos and the Rider Commandos, forcing Gatchaman to use Tornado Fighter. It puts a strain on them, but it works. At that moment, Count Egobossler arrives and he and Ken proceed to swordfight. Eventually, Ken lands the killing blow but it's revealed the Egobossler he fought was just a robot. The real Egobossler mocks Ken for thinking he'd fight them head-on and blows up the robot's head, sending Ken over a balcony. Ken yells for Egobossler to come out and Kempler comes back with fresh troops, forcing Gatchaman to retreat, Joe having to drag Ken onto the GatchaSpartan. Egobossler and Leader Z laugh and gloat over their victory while Joe tells Ken that falling back was the right thing to do.
7	"Steal the Giant Iron Beast"; Transliteration: "Kyodai Tetsujū o Ubae!" (Japanese: 巨大鉄獣を奪え!)	November 18, 1979
Iron Zaurus, a Galactor Iron Beast, attacks the city of Tehsran. Count Egobossler tells them to surrender their iron or be destroyed. The mayor agrees to the demand, to the shock of the city authorities and his son Tony. Galactor takes over the iron manufactory while Tony rages at his father's cowardice. However, later that night, Tony finds his father calling Gatchaman for help with a hidden radio. Gatchaman receive their message but Ken says they can't help them. The mayor despairs while Tony swears to defeat Egobossler himself. Ryu, Jun and Jinpei lash out at Ken for his refusal to help but he, Joe and Kamo point out that since the mayor is right in the middle of Galactor's forces, if Galactor picked up the message, they'd double down on their defenses. With that, Gatchaman heads out. Meanwhile, Tony attacks Egobossler with a slingshot and is caught by Galactor soldiers but is saved by Ken. Tony tells Ken about himself and why he did what he did. Ken tells Tony to wait under the bridge before leaving but Tony says he'll still do it. The mayor is brought before Count Egobossler and Kempler, who reveal that his message to Gatchaman was picked up by Iron Zaurus' radar. Tony arrives and is caught once again by Galactor. Egobossler orders them both to be killed but they're saved by Jun and Jinpei. Egobossler summons Iron Zaurus but it's been taken over by Ken, Joe and Ryu. Galactor's forces retreat and Ken tells Iron Zaurus' pilot to contact Leader Z. He teleports in but before Gatchaman can attack, Leader Z reels them in with a tractor beam. Leader Z attacks them with drills, drones and the disassembled pieces of Iron Zaurus. Once Joe is able to destroy the Iron Beast's head, Leader Z decides he'll kill them slowly instead, blows the three out of his tower and leaves. Jun and Jinpei catch up to them and report Galactor's departure but Ken has realized just how terrifying Leader Z is. As Gatchaman leaves, Tony realizes that Ken was one of them.
8	"The Desperate Outlaw Squad"; Transliteration: "Kesshi no Narazumono Sentai" (Japanese: 決死のならず者戦隊)	November 25, 1979
A fire at a prison allows a large number of its prisoners to escape. Some head to Geltrand, Egobossler's main base, and they are all killed by Galactor. Meanwhile, Gatchaman study a map of places under Galactor's control when Chief Nambu informs them of the Data Bank Base where it's believed the data on Galactor's plans are. Nambu warns them that it's heavily defended and the team heads out. At the Data Bank Base, Egobossler uses its Planning Room to predict enemy movements and how to attack. Outside, Ken and Joe walk to the Base while Jun, Jinpei and Ryu stay behind. The two spot three prisoners on the run from Galactor, who give them the brush-off. Ken and Joe follow them but the prisoners are quickly captured, so they save them. The prisoners introduce themselves-safecracker Alan Rocky, cat burglar Sam the Razor and Nick the assassin. They join Ken and Joe in order to get around the base and into Balgium. The five continue on, passing through a minefield but are stopped by a cave lined with laser turrets. However, Sam lifted a pass card from the Galactor soldiers, deactivating them. They enter the Data Bank Base and Ken and Joe leave the prisoners behind to complete their mission and overhear Egobossler sending his Agrica conquering plans to Databank SP-1. Meanwhile, Alan leaves their room and Sam goes after him. Ken and Joe reach the data bank just as Rocky and Sam do and Rocky uses his safecracking skills to get the data. Nick arrives, warns them about a gun and is shot. He tells them with his last words that he wanted to die as it's the only way he can atone for all the people he killed as an assassin and that he set a time bomb in the machine room. Count Egobossler, Kempler and Mechandol arrive and Rocky tells them he stole their data cassette. The soldiers open fire and the four flee but hit a dead end. Sam grabs a missile and threatens to smash it, which scares the soldiers away. He trips and drops the missile which rolls into the data bank and destroys it and causes a chain reaction, blowing him away. As Egobossler, Kempler and Mechandol escape, Nick's bomb goes off and destroys the Data Bank Base. Rocky refuses to hand over the data cassette without payment but a still living Sam scolds him, reminding him that Nick gave his life for them to obtain it. Rocky is unsympathetic and says he'll sell it to Chief Nambu, then leaves. Joe starts to go after him but Sam reveals he took the cassette from Rocky. The three then reunite with Jun, Jinpei and Ryu, with plans to drop Sam off in Balgium.
9	"Fear of the Extinction Ray Gun"; Transliteration: "Shōmetsu Kōsen-hō no Kyōfu" (Japanese: 消滅光線砲の恐怖)	December 2, 1979
Count Egobossler is concerned that Nambu will decipher the data that was stolen in the previous episode. Kempler says their only choices are to kill Nambu or rush their Agrican advance. Egobossler decides the latter, saying to tell Dr. Doll, who is building a matter elimination cannon, to finish and equip it to a mecha and leaves the mission of retrieving the data to Kempler. They are then informed that Dr. Doll's daughter has escaped. The daughter, Karen, skis to a National Defense camp, where she collapses. Chief Nambu informs Gatchaman of this and what Dr. Doll is doing for Galactor, who had gone missing a year ago and they believe kidnapped him. Nambu then tells them that a matter elimination cannon can destroy anything, even pierce the Earth itself. The team head out to find the secret base and destroy the cannon, while Nambu asks Kamo how he's doing deciphering the Galactor data. Meanwhile, Egobossler and Mechandol question Dr. Doll about his daughter's escape and he claims it was her own idea. Kempler reports that Gatchaman is coming and Egobossler tells Doll to finish the cannon, reminding him that he's the only one who understands his theory. At the National Defense camp, the team are shocked to learn from Karen that her father joined Galactor willingly. Karen says her father turned to drink after his theory was rejected, making him an easy target for Egobossler. Karen doesn't remember where Galactor's Helps base is but begs to come with them. Ken says they can't due to the danger but the team convince him to let him take Karen with them to help them find the base. Meanwhile, the cannon is finished and successfully tested on the ISO's Mantle Energy plant in Agrica, which Nambu informs Gatchaman about, much to Karen's despair. Egobossler orders the cannon be attached to a mecha while Dr. Doll boasts that his theory was right. Karen suddenly appears and begs her father to stop but he still wants revenge. Mechandol moves to kill her but Gatchaman show themselves and a battle ensues, which they quickly win. Karen messes with the cannon's controls, causing it to explode and kill her. Egobossler summons the mecha, which he, Kempler and Mechandol enter and Gatchaman runs for the GatchaSpartan. Another fight commences, with Ken able to break into the mecha's head but Egobossler and his men escape. Dr. Doll voices his remorse for everything he did and tries to kill himself to atone. Joe stops him and Ken says the real way to atone is to work toward world peace
10	"Danger! Gatchaman Base"; Transliteration: "Ayaushi! Gatchaman Kichi" (Japanese: 危うし! ガッチャマン基地)	December 9, 1979
Kempler is sent to infiltrate ISO headquarters to learn the location of Gatchaman's base and get back the stolen data but is unable to due to ISO's security. To help him, Egobossler sends in an assassin named Vittendorf. Meanwhile, Kamo works on analyzing the Galactor data but progress is slow. Jinpei reminds the team of his upcoming birthday but they're oblivious. Chief Nambu calls to tell them that he's coming to help decipher the enemy data. Vittendorf, who has joined Kempler, learns of Nambu's plan and shoots him with a dart. Nambu arrives at Gatchaman headquarters and gives Jinpei boxing gloves as a birthday present. He's then hit by a headache, caused by the dart Vittendorf shot him with which has put him under mind control. The signal is picked up by Jinpei's bracelet as he's repairing it. The mind-controlled Nambu collects several time bombs from storage and plants them throughout the base. Meanwhile, Vittendorf demonstrates the dart's effects to Kempler, that Nambu will destroy Gatchaman Base, then kill himself. The bombs go off and Gatchaman rush into action. Kamo finds Nambu in the hangar and is attacked by him. Gatchaman arrive and Kamo tells them Nambu is being controlled. Nambu shoots Ken in the shoulder but they still can't bring themselves to hurt him. However, Jinpei notices Nambu's glasses glowing and realizing that's how Nambu's being controlled. He shoots at Nambu until his glasses fall off. Kamo removes the dart from them, restoring Nambu to normal. When the failure is reported, Kempler shoots and kills Vittendorf.
11	"The Saturn Limited Express Z-Press"; Transliteration: "Satan Tokkyû Z-Puresu" (Japanese: サタン特急Zプレス)	December 16, 1979
Leader Z lambastes Count Egobossler for his recent failures with Gatchaman but Egobossler tells him he will take advantage of Gatchaman's lack of ruthlessness with the train Satan Limited Z-Press, which is headed to Pabraltar with materials for Iron Beasts. Meanwhile, Chief Nambu tells Gatchaman he believes Galactor will attack Mantle Base in Agrica and that the Z-Press is headed to a spot where Galactor soldiers are gathering. The team is to help UN explosive operatives destroy the train. They find the train but discover that Galactor has hostages on board, which Egobossler had anticipated. The GatchaSpartan is formed and Ken makes a new plan: Joe, Ryu and Jinpei will go and set explosives on the bridge while he and Jun will infiltrate the train and save the hostages before they get to the bridge. Ken and Jun drop onto the Z-Press and quickly take out the hostages' guards. However, one of the hostages is a UN Explosives Operative named Anita, who informs them that the train will blow up in five minutes due to a bomb she set up. She refuses to turn it off due to her orders to destroy the Z-Press and that more people will die if the train delivers its cargo. More Galactor soldiers arrive but Anita scares them off with her bomb. She refuses to give it up, completely dedicated to her mission. One of the hostages angrily shoots at Anita, causing her to drop it, but Jun catches and disarms it. Ken and Jun then lead Anita and the hostages to the last car, fighting Galactor soldiers along the way. Once they get there, Ken works on cutting it off from the train when a train car carrying a bomb remotely controlled by Anita's colleagues rolls up. Meanwhile at the bridge, Joe and Jinpei witness the UN Explosives Operatives being killed by Galactor soldiers. Back on the train, Jun helps Anita shoot off the bomb train's fuse, causing it to stop. Ken cuts the car loose from the train and tells Joe and Jinpei to blow up the bridge. Joe does so, destroying both the bridge and the Z-Press. The GatchaSpartan picks them up and Ken takes out the remaining train cars by sending Galactor jets crashing into them. However, unbeknownst to Gatchaman, the whole plan was a fake to show Egobossler their weakness.
12	"The Order to Destroy the Mantle Base"; Transliteration: "Mantoru Kichi Bakuha Shirei" (Japanese: マントル基地爆破指令)	December 23, 1979
Galactor invades Agrica. At an ISO, the representatives and Chief Nambu deduce that they're going after the mantle energy bases. Nambu says they still have not decoded the Galactor data and that they need to destroy Leader Z. Meanwhile, Gatchaman and Kamo finally decipher the data's key programs and show Nambu and the representatives: the goal of the Agrican invasion is to capture the mantle energy bases, as well as various other resources, and give them to Leader Z so he can make more Iron Beast mechas. However, it cuts out before it says what Leader Z will do when the world has been conquered. The first objective is revealed to be the mantle energy base in the Gatlas Mountains and Gatchaman head there but Galactor gets there first. Egobossler and Leader Z plan to make their next move. Gatchaman arrive at the mountains but are too late: Galactor has taken over the mantle base. Leader Z teleports in and the team form the GatchaSpartan. Galactor gives the materials they took to Leader Z who uses them to create Iron Beasts. Ken cuts an opening in Leader Z's tower but it instantly repairs itself. Chief Nambu calls Gatchaman and tells them to destroy the mantle base so Galactor can't use it. The team has Kamo remotely control the GatchaSpartan while they enter Leader Z via the tractor beams taking in the materials. Once inside, the team heads toward the reactor and find the mechas, and are attacked by Leader Z's defenses. During the fight, Jun spots the reactor core. The mechas start up and advance on the team, who run for the core. Ken slashes the reactor with his Feathered Edge and they use Tornado Fighter to escape. Magma from the destroyed reactor destroys the mechas in turn and forces Leader Z to retreat as well as taking out the Galactor soldiers and tanks in the area. Egobossler is enraged to hear that the mantle base was destroyed while the ISO are happy to hear Gatchaman's mission was a success.
13	"Violence?! The Decisive Battle of Agrika"; Transliteration: "Gekiretsu?! Agurika Kessen" (Japanese: 激烈?! アグリカ決戦)	December 30, 1980
The UN 8th Nuclear Fleet heads to Agrica to take out Galactor, who has taken control of the three mantle bases in the northern part of the continent. Upon hearing of the battle, Chief Nambu tells them to take down Egobossler at his main base. The team are airdropped a pair of cards which Ken says will be their lifeline. Meanwhile, the UN forces engage the four Iron Beast mechas guarding the Agrican coast but a trap is sprung and the ships are hit with torpedoes. Leader Z tells Count Egobossler that Gatchaman is coming. Sure enough, they arrive and destroy the mechas and the army follows them. Kempler shoots down the GatchaSpartan, which crashes and explodes. However, it was a decoy; Joe and Ryu infiltrate the main base in a truck while disguised as Galactor soldiers; the cards they received were fake Galactor security cards. However, when the real soldiers use their card, the guards sound the alarm and send out the Rider Commandos. At a different entrance, a disguised Ken, Jun and Jinpei enter with their cards but are cornered and fired upon. They make off in a jeep while the Rider Commandos shoot at Joe and Ryu. The three make it to Egobossler's lair and confront him. He and Ken swordfight, which spills outside. Egobossler then runs into a statue and a cobra Iron Beast is unleashed just as Joe and Ryu arrive. The team enter their mechs and form the GatchaSpartan and destroy it. Egobossler's statue is revealed to also be an Iron Beast and he uses it to leave the scene, where he finds that the UN defeated his forces, and his Iron Beast sinks into the sand.
14	"Destruction by Fire! Egobossler's Palace"; Transliteration: "Enjō! Egobosurā Kyūden" (Japanese: 炎上!エゴボスラー宮殿)	January 6, 1980
Galactor has disappeared following their defeat in Agrica. Chief Nambu shows Gatchaman the UN's newest weapons, the Phaser Tanks, which are driving Galactor's forces back through Europa and tells them that Count Egobossler has returned to his home base, thanks to a UN intelligence operative named Colonel Bachs. Bachs has also revealed that there is an emergency time bomb in the palace and Ken wants to rendezvous with him to destroy the castle with the bomb and capture Egobossler. Meanwhile, at Satanhofen, Leader Z chews out Egobossler for retreating in his last confrontation with Gatchaman and how it's caused his troops to fall into disarray. Afterwards, Kempler tells Egobossler that one of their spies, Yurgent, has gained Nambu's trust and is going to make contact with Gatchaman. Meanwhile, Gatchaman arrives and Ken heads off to meet with Colonel Bachs, with Joe taking Jun and Jinpei to secretly follow him. Ken finds Bachs fixing a flat tire on his truck and does it for him but sees Bachs trying to brain him with a wrench in the hubcap's reflection. He foils the attack by dropping the wheel. Kempler, who is hiding close by, tries to have Ken shot but is prevented by a line of departing tanks and Bachs and Ken drive into the city. Bachs tries to stab Ken but is foiled when Ken jumps out of the truck to save a child from getting hit by their truck. When they leave the city, it's reported to Kempler, who confirms that Bachs is actually the spy Yurgent. Meanwhile, Joe, Jinpei and Jun follow in a bus. Yurgent notices Kempler's tank behind them and warns Ken before they're fired upon. At that moment, the UN drop phaser tanks into the city. Kempler shoots out one of Ken's tires and he and Yurgent go off a bridge and into a river. Kempler stops to shoot at the water but has his tank knocked off the bridge by Joe, Jun and Jinpei's bus. The three jump out and transform and Joe calls Ryu. Ken then pulls himself and Yurgent back up onto the bridge where Yurgent confesses that he's a spy. As Ryu arrives in the GatchaSpartan, Satanhofen emerges from the ground and fires on it. Ryu flies into a wall, creating an entrance for the others. Back in the city, the Iron Beast Centipede is formed and attacks the phaser tanks and Ryu proceeds to fight it. Inside the palace, the rest of the team fight through the Galactor soldiers and Yurgent leads Ken to the bomb. Ken switches it on when Egobossler comes in and shoots Yurgent, who dies in Ken's arms. Ryu manages to knock Centipede onto the palace and the bomb goes off, destroying them both. Ken reports the colonel's death to Nambu and that Egobossler and the people are all gone. The team surmise that they've all moved to a new base.
15	"Hell's Burning Ambition"; Transliteration: "Jigoku de Moeru Yabō" (Japanese: 地獄で燃える野望)	January 13, 1980
Count Egobossler fumes over his recent defeat and curses Gatchaman when a member of the Youth Flying Corp Paul Garrett begs him to flee before Gatchaman finds them. Paul pleads Egobossler not to die then leaves to fight Gatchaman and the count is then taken by Leader Z, who shows him all the mechas he lost in battle with Gatchaman. Egobossler tells Leader Z the fault also lies with him for fleeing from Agrica. Z says that humans can't carry out their initial plans and that Berg Katze and Gel Sadra died because they showed their human weakness, showing him Berg's suicide and Gel's betrayal. Leader Z then shows Egobossler an underground train terminal where the people are calling out to him. Z tells Egobossler that he wants his help, he must become his underling and Egobossler agrees, knowing he still needs Z's power. Leader Z gives him a new Iron Beast and Egobossler is surprised to find Paul piloting it but agrees to leave the mission to him. Paul takes the Iron Beast to the surface and Gatchaman form the GatchaSpartan. Ken is surprised to see a boy piloting the Iron Beast but Joe says he's still a member of Galactor. Ken takes out aircraft sent out by the Iron Beast and one crashes into it, knocking it down. Paul draws his gun on Gatchaman, telling him his family had nothing before Egobossler, Ken telling them he's only doing it to further his own goals. As Ken tries to convince Paul that Galactor is evil, Egobossler opens a secret panel in the ground and escapes, abandoning Paul. Devastated, Paul says he doesn't know which side is right as Egobossler meets up with Kempler and Mechandol on the last departing train. Ken tells Paul one day he'll know one day and when he does, he must decide for himself which is right. Meanwhile, Egobossler's forces settle in an underground city called Galatown, that is identical to Satanhofen and located beneath Iberia.
16	"A Deadly Butterfly Dances in the Dark"; Transliteration: "Yami de Mau Satsujin Chō" (Japanese: 闇に舞う殺人蝶)	January 20, 1980
The people of Europa celebrate the destruction of Satanhofen and the disappearance of Egobossler and Galactor. In Galatown, Egobossler tells Leader Z that their spies in Wholland have a new plan to kill every world leader. An aide of Wholland's president Aizen drives to tell Chief Nambu that Aizen and his daughter Abelia are in danger but his car is attacked by a swarm of butterflies. Chief Nambu informs Gatchaman of what happened and the team leave to investigate the president's surroundings. Meanwhile, Aizen tells Abelia that someone wants to use the tulips he plans to send to the world leaders to kill them and that she will be killed if he doesn't comply. Abelia leaves to tell someone what's going on, followed unawares by a butterfly, and is ambushed by a group of men but is saved by Ken. The two return to her mansion and Ken meets with the rest of the team in a windmill to report their findings. As they sleep, Aizen's butler Bengal summons the butterflies which destroy the windmills support beams but they escape, only for the butterflies to attack them with the windmill's propellor. Gatchaman destroy it with their G-mechs and follow the butterflies but they disappear from their radar. They land to investigate, which is the presidential mansion. Aizen tries to stop them from entering the dome where the tulips intended for the world leaders are kept but Bengal tells him to let them in. Once they're inside, Bengal turns the tulips into the butterflies and they attack Gatchaman. When Bengal climbs to higher ground, Ken throws the Feathered Edge and cuts down a lamp, knocking Bengal down and breaking his remote control. The butterflies attack and destroy Bengal, revealing him to be an android. A butterfly Iron Beast then emerges from under the dome and sends a swarm of butterflies towards town. Kamo then calls and tells Gatchaman to use the GatchaSpartan's new move, Hyper Shot, which will create a fireball-like barrier. The team form the GatchaSpartan and use the Hyper Shot, which destroys all the butterflies and the Iron Beast. Ken apologizes for destroying the flower garden but Aizen points out new sprouts that are growing
17	"Horror of the Evil Smoke City"; Transliteration: "Senritsu no Ma En Toshi" (Japanese: 戦慄の魔煙都市)	January 27, 1980
Kempler digs up a substance called Yellow Sarutorin. Meanwhile, the city of New Jork prepares for Egobossler's counterattack with heavy protection that includes Gatchaman. That night, outside the city, Kempler arrives in a ship where his soldiers grow the Yellow Sarutorin and turn it into gas. When the ship docks, Kempler and his men kill the guards and trucks come to receive their cargo, which pass inspection from Jinpei. The next morning, the trucks stop in the middle of the city and Galactor soldiers come out and spray nerve gas on the people. Ken alerts Jun, Jinpei realizing what he's done. When arriving on the scene, Jinpei gives his oxygen mask to a little girl and succumbs to the gas. The trucks leave the city with Ken, Joe and Ryu riding on the back of one. The gassed victims are taken to a church, where Jun frets over Jinpei. Meanwhile, Ken, Joe and Ryu witness the amphibious trucks return to Galactor's ship and the team (minus Jinpei) inform Chief Nambu. The team decide to sneak into Galactor's base while Nambu is told that the people are angry that Gatchaman let Galactor's trucks get through. As the team prepare to leave, they find Jun doesn't have her oxygen mask, having used it to save Jinpei; Ken gives her his. The team fly to the ship in their mechs and it changes into an Iron Beast, with the trucks turning into fighter planes that insert themselves into slots in the Iron Beast. Back at the church, Jinpei is woken by a nurse and sees that the girl he saved is alive. Gatchaman's four separate mechs are unable to damage the Iron Beast and neither are the soldiers defending New Jork as the Iron Beast releases more nerve gas. Meanwhile, Jinpei struggles through the gas to get to his mecha. Kempler fires a missile at the ISO building, gassing Nambu, as Gatchaman continues to fight. Jinpei arrives and the team form the GatchaSpartan, Ken having to raise the air pressure in his cockpit to get rid of gas that got in through his damaged canopy glass. They destroy the Iron Beast with Hyper Shot, Kempler barely managing to escape.
18	"The Spectacular Crash of G-1"; Transliteration: "G1-Gō Kareinaru Gekitotsu!" (Japanese: G1号華麗なる激突!)	February 3, 1980
Soldiers guard a secret UN weapons storage facility in the mountains when the alarm sounds. Mechandol is attacking with an army of Iron Commandos and an Iron Beast. The Iron Commandos gun down the soldiers and the Iron Beast destroys their cannons. The Iron Beast then dispenses a squadron of jets, led by Colonel Heinrich aka the Falcon of Cicily who destroys the entire facility with several perfectly aimed missiles; the fourth in a row. Gatchaman arrive on the scene and engage Heinrich's squadron but Mechandol tells him to pull back. Gatchaman attempt to pursue but fail due to a smokescreen left by the Iron Beast. Back at base, they discuss Heinrich and why he keeps running away. Kamo comes in with a list of weapon storage facilities that are most likely to be attacked next and Chief Nambu tells them they need to defeat Heinrich to improve UN troop morale. In Galatown, Count Egobossler praises Heinrich before his troops and awards him the Egobossler Cross. Afterward, Heinrich begs to be allowed to fight Gatchaman but is told to wait. Meanwhile, Kamo theorizes that the next weapon storage facility that will be attacked will either be in Gremoire or Wadison Bay; Ken decides to go to Gremoine. This proves to be the right decision, as it is attacked by Mechandol, his Iron Commandos and his Iron Beast but are hit by surprise defenses. Ken tells Joe he wants to fight Heinrich one-on-one. Mechandol sends him and his squadron out just as Gatchaman arrive and Ken and Heinrich fly off to have their fight. Ken asks Heinrich why he fights for Galactor and Heinrich answers that he's from the impoverished island of Cicily, whose inhabitants were scorned and discriminated against, and Egobossler recruited them to Galactor, allowing Heinrich to get revenge on the world who looked down on him and his people. Joe, Jun, Jinpei and Ryu struggle to fight the Iron Beast until Jinpei discovers an old minefield which they're able to lure it onto. Ken and Heinrich dogfight and Heinrich uses his special technique, the Spinning Tornado Drop, which allows him to score a hit on Ken. Joe, Jun, Jinpei and Ryu arrive but Ken tells them not to go after Heinrich. He pulls up and shoots Heinrich down, saluting him while lamenting that he worked for Galactor. Count Egobossler comes to the flaming wreckage of Heinrich's jet and takes the Egobossler Cross off of his corpse, saying that dead men don't need medals. He then has Kempler torch the wreckage.
19	"Don't Touch the Super Stuff!"; Transliteration: "Chō Busshitsu ni Te o Dasuna!" (Japanese: 超物質に手をだすな!)	February 10, 1980
Mercenary scientist Professor Gordon develops an indestructible material called Neophryte and decides to sell it to the highest bidder. So he summons agents from both Galactor (Kempler) and the ISO (Ken) to meet alone on a spot he specifies. Kempler doesn't come alone, bringing with him Mechandol and an Iron Beast but the rest of the Science Ninja Team arrive as well. While the Galactors and the rest of Gatchaman take part in a snarling standoff outside, Gordon, Kempler and Ken negotiate. Kempler offers money, while Ken refuses to haggle, stating honor and decency as his reasons (and knowing as Gordon does that once he withdraws his protection, Galactor will simply take what they want by force). Worried about his father, Gordon's son Tommy finally ends the standoff and uncovers the compound for both sides to fight over. Joe uses a bazooka loaded with Neophryte to blow a hole in the Iron Beast and it steps on the compound, destroying the other Neophryte bazookas. Gordon mourns the lost Neophryte but Ken reminds him that he still has Tommy
20	"Appearance! Terror of the Triple Iron Beast"; Transliteration: "Shutsugen! Toriputu Tetsujin no Kyōbu" (Japanese: 出現!トリプル鉄獣の恐怖)	February 17, 1980
Galactor has been quiet recently and Ken is frustrated by their endless cycle of fighting. Dr. Spencer of Fogey Island contacts Chief Nambu and asks for all data on Leader X in order to discover the weakness of Leader Z; Ken volunteers the team to take it to him. As Dr. Spencer cross-calculates the data, he tells Gatchaman about Space Pulse AQ3, whose energy Leader Z might be using. Meanwhile, Leader Z notices that the pulse is breaking up and that might mean someone's discovered his true form. Count Egobossler tells him that his men have discovered that the waves are coming from the ISO lab on Fogey Island. Leader Z orders him to destroy it while Egobossler is pleased to have found something Z is afraid of. The Iron Beast Devil Tripler arrives at the island, as Dr. Spencer predicted, since he had been jamming their signal. Ken is outraged that Spencer would put the islanders' lives at risk, but he tells Ken to get revenge for him, as his wife and son were killed in a Galactor attack. Gatchaman form the GatchaSpartan and engage Devil Tripler but it splits into three parts and quickly shoots them down, then destroys the lab and the islanders' homes. When fog rolls in and night falls, ground troops are sent out. Meanwhile, Ryu informs Ken that they can't repair the GatchaSpartan because the joint cable was severed and the only one that can fix it is Kamo. Dr. Spencer finds them, as do the villagers. The villagers beg Gatchaman to get them to safety but Dr. Spencer says that the data he recovered is more important. Ken agonizes over what to do, then tells Ryu to contact Kamo about fixing the GatchaSpartan, even though that means Galactor will find them. Sure enough, they do and Gatchaman defeat them but not before the squad leader contacts Devil Tripler. Dr. Spencer gets distracted by a Galactor soldier blasting a woman and boy with a flamethrower and is blasted himself, his data burning up. Ken takes off in his G-1 and engages Devil Tripler and pierces its belly, destroying it. The next morning, Dr. Spencer apologizes to Ken for being so obsessed with revenge. Joe, Jun and Jinpei lament the loss of Spencer's data, but Ken says they still have Dr. Spencer and takes him to a hospital. Meanwhile, Egobossler fumes over being unable to learn Leader Z's weakness.
21	"Angry Joe! Fright of the Flaming Bird"; Transliteration: "Ikare Jō! Senritsu no Honō-dori" (Japanese: 怒れジョー!戦慄の炎鳥)	February 24, 1980
The extinct volcano Mountterhorn in the Helps erupts and destroys a town. Chief Nambu tells Joe to go to Vici Island for the anniversary of his parents' deaths but Joe wants to investigate the Mountterhorn eruption. Nambu tells him to investigate an extinct volcano on Vici Island. Once Joe gets to Vici Island, he's followed by a strange red bird, which is a spy robot for Galactor and is recognized. At his parents' grave, Joe runs into Anna, an old friend of his. The two reconnect and Joe points out the red birds and knocks one down, revealing its robotic innards. The phoenixes attack Joe and Anna but they're able to hide, Anna learning that Joe is a member of Gatchaman. That night, the two sneak back into town and Anna locks Joe in an old Galactor pillbox, in order to turn Gatchaman away so that Galactor will not attack and Vici will not be destroyed again. Ken, Jun, Jinpei and Ryu arrive but Anna tells them Joe left the island and they head in the direction she points them to. Anna is then approached by Galactor soldiers and their leader, Commander Garius, but is able to escape. Anna frees Joe and they head to Galactor's underground base in the volcano, blasting through a swarm of phoenixes. The rest of the team arrive and they form the GatchaSpartan. Garius makes the volcano erupt and sends out the Iron Beast Gazzan. Ken uses Hyper Shot to cut off Gazzan's head, sending it falling onto the volcano, destroying the base and killing Garius and his men. The next morning, Anna says they'll rebuild Vici again and Joe says she can do it.
22	"Order to Blast the Satellite"; Transliteration: "Jinkō Eisei Bakuha Shirei" (Japanese: 人工衛星爆破指令)	March 2, 1980
23	"The Evil of Mechaland"; Transliteration: "Ma no Mekarando" (Japanese: 魔のメカランド)	March 9, 1980
24	"A Warrior's Pride"; Transliteration: "Hokori Takaki Senshi" (Japanese: 誇り高き戦士)	July 16, 1980
25	"Sky Riders from Hell"; Transliteration: "Jigoku no Sukai Raidā" (Japanese: 地獄のスカイライダー)	March 23, 1980
One of Egobossler's old friends and colleagues Oncain, is also the last man on Earth who knows Count Egobossler's deep, dark secrets. The Kagaku Ninjatai get to Oncain first and try to convince him to stay away from Egobossler, but the man will have nothing of it. He invites the Team to go fox-hunting and with his two children, Michael and Mary, and as they're distracted, arranges to meet with Egobossler. The inevitable showdown with Egobossler and his special Skyrider command is spectacular, but even Ken and Joe at their best can't prevent Ego from gunning down his man. Joe comes round the corner just in time as Ego shoots Oncain right before Michael and Mary's eyes (triggering a flashback where you almost see the faces of Joe's parents). In the final scene, Joe kneels down and has a little heart-to-heart talk with Michael. You don't hear what he says, only Michael's reactions.
26	"G-1 Enraged! A New Way to Kill"; Transliteration: "G1-gō Ikari no Shinsappō" (Japanese: G1号怒りの新殺法)	March 30, 1980
27	"The Mystery of Egobossler's Birth"; Transliteration: "Egobosurā Shūshō no Nazo" (Japanese: エゴボスラー出生の謎)	April 6, 1980
Egobossler orders his men to kill Zelda and her husband to prevent his secret from coming to light. His past is revealed to be a man named Efren an illegitimate son of Count Caspary Egobossler and a maid named Margot. Due to his lower background, he was treated horribly by both father and his older half-brother, Kassel. After Margot died revealing her secret, Egobossler dyed both his skin blue and his hair white. He killed his father and imprisoned Kassel in retribution for her death. This secret is found out by Marsota, a rival of Egobossler's whose seeking to overthrow him as the leader of Galactor.
28	"Desperate Fight! Valley of Betrayal"; Transliteration: "Shitō! Uragiri no Tani" (Japanese: 死闘!裏切りの谷)	April 13, 1980
29	"Cruelty! The Separation of Brother and Sister"; Transliteration: "Hijō! Hikisaka reta Kyōdai" (Japanese: 非情!引き裂かれた兄妹)	April 20, 1980
Marsota continues his plans to overtake Egobossler by using his own secret against him in order to force his cooperation. Leader Zed pools his support for him due to their previous history when he was Leader X
30	"The Creeping Alien"; Transliteration: "Shinobiyoru Eirian" (Japanese: 忍び寄るエイリアン)	April 27, 1980
31	"Runaway! The Great Train Chase"; Transliteration: "Gekisō! Torein Cheisu" (Japanese: 激走!トレインチェイス)	May 4, 1980
32	"Mystery of the Space Pulse"; Transliteration: "Uchū Parasu no Nazo" (Japanese: 宇宙パルスの謎)	May 11, 1980
33	"A Promise Kept"; Transliteration: "Hatasa reta Yakusoku" (Japanese: はたされた約束)	May 18, 1980
34	"Egobossler's Strategy"; Transliteration: "Egobosurā no Sakuryaku" (Japanese: エゴボスラーの策略)	May 25, 1980
35	"The Shadow of Death Approaches G-1"; Transliteration: "Shi no Kagesemaru G1-dō" (Japanese: 死の影せまるG1号)	June 1, 1980
36	"Hypershoot Crisis"; Transliteration: "Haipāshūto no Kiki" (Japanese: ハイパーシュートの危機)	June 8, 1980
Nambu finally reveals that Ken is dying from the exposure of the Hypershoot. Joe demanded to know why he wasn't chosen for this, explaining he had died once. Nambu explains that even if he chosen Joe, his cybernetics would never be able to handle such stress and Ken volunteered.
37	"Revive Gatchaman"; Transliteration: "Yomigare Gatchaman" (Japanese: よみがえれガッチャマン)	June 15, 1980
38	"Bracelet of Friendship"; Transliteration: "Yūjō no Buresuretto" (Japanese: 友情のブレスレット)	June 22, 1980
39	"Downfall! Count Egobossler"; Transliteration: "Shikkyaku! Egobosurā Hakushaku" (Japanese: 失脚!エゴボスラー伯爵)	June 29, 1980
Nambu rebuilds the ISO observatory to decipher the Space Pulse mystery. Meanwhile, Kempler discovers information found by Marsota regarding Egobossler's secret. He betrays Egobossler by releasing Kassel and helping him retake control of his rightful position. Most of the forces side with Kempler, strips Efren from power, imprisons him and begin their invasion with the help of Leader Zed's new mecha. However, on the way to being jailed in the north prison, Mechandol and the remaining forces releases him. Mechandol explains that even though Kassel's the rightful heir, he refuses to swear loyalty to him like Kempler did. Instead, he pronounces Efren as the real Count Egobossler and both marches forward to the Arctic base to destroy ISO's new facility and kill Nambu. They almost succeed in defeating Gatchaman with their might until Kempler's forces arrive to intervene and unwittingly turned the tide of battle against them. Forced to retreat, Efren orders his men to shoot Kassel. Even though Gatchaman is able to beat Zed's newest mecha, they were unable to stop the loss of life caused by the warring Egobosslers. While pursuing Efren, the bullet hits Kassel and he dies. Efren is satisfied that he finally got rid of Kassel, though he is also aware that Kempler will remain a threat.
40	"Surprise Attack of the Mecha Waterspout"; Transliteration: "Meka Tatsumaki no Kyūshū!" (Japanese: メカ竜巻の急襲!)	July 5, 1980
In the wake of Kassel's death, the government put their trust in Kempler to bring them victory. Meanwhile after seeing his failure, Leader Zed returns to Count Egobossler and entrusts him with his newest mecha. He and Mechandol sets a trap for Kempler who is seeking to avenge Kassel. The newest mecha attacks him and his forces while it disguises itself as a destructive waterspout. It soon makes its way to New Jork and Jinpei is sent to help with the evacuations. He must however convince the children to evacuate safely.
41	"Collapse! Gatchaman Base"; Transliteration: "Hōkai! Gatchaman Kichi" (Japanese: 崩壊!ガッチャマン基地)	July 12, 1980
Ken's treatment to prevent his cell deterioration is successful, but Nambu knows it's only temporary. Meanwhile, Kempler is finally captured by Efren and his men. He knows the latter can't live as long as he remains a threat to his position in Galactor. Mechandol is informed from their spy where the Gatchaman base is and Efren is pleased. With her help, Efren brings down the base and captures Nambu.
42	"The Death of Chief Nambu"; Transliteration: "Nanbu Chūkan no Saigo" (Japanese: 南部長官の最期)	July 19, 1980
Efren begins his interrogation against Nambu. When he takes a sip of his wine, he finds out too late that Nambu not only switched the cups, but laced his own with the truth serum packet. He demands answers for the Space Pulse mystery and barricaded them inside his office. Under the effects of the serum, Egobossler confessed that AQ3 is exactly an anti-matter process meant to destroy Earth. This confirms Nambu's suspicions as the team arrives to rescue him. Before they could collect him, Mechandol shoots him. Before dying, Nambu explains what Galactor's plan is to Ken.
43	"The Destruction of Gallatown"; Transliteration: "Gyarantaun no Kaimetsu" (Japanese: ギャラタウンの壊滅)	July 26, 1980
Egobossler executes Kempler and the government accepts Efren as the real count.
44	"The Space Devil Draws Near"; Transliteration: "Semari Kuru Uchū no Akuma" (Japanese: 迫り来る宇宙の悪魔)	August 3, 1980
45	"Threat of the Antimatter Planet"; Transliteration: "Kyōi no Hanbusshitsu Wakusei" (Japanese: 脅威の反物質惑星)	August 10, 1980
46	"G-1 Desperate for High Power"; Transliteration: "G1-dō Kesshi no Hai Pawā" (Japanese: G1号決死のハイパワー)	August 17, 1980
47	"Earth Extinction! 3 2 1"; Transliteration: "Chikyū Shōmetsu! 321..." (Japanese: 地球消滅!321…)	August 24, 1980
48	"Gatchaman Eternal"; Transliteration: "Eien no Gatchaman" (Japanese: 永遠のガッチャマン)	August 31, 1980
The Team searches for Zed in his tower, and are thrown around like playthings. When they finally meet up, they discover what happened to Egobossler: his corpse is pinned against a wall in Zed's main chamber, run through by his own sword. At this point, Joe picks up on Zed's vital signs (as Rafael had designed him to) and tracks the alien to his last refuge, where the Kagaku Ninjatai battle to destroy him... and fall. Chief Nambu's mysterious pendant (an unanalyzed device he'd instructed Kamo to give to the Team before the last battle) comes into play then, activating the Gatchaspartan and swallowing the fallen ninjas with light... The final scene is of an enormous firebird breaking free of Zed's exploding tower and flying around the Earth, leaving the viewers to analyze the wide-open ending.
