= DuckTales (multimedia franchise) =

DuckTales is an American multimedia franchise produced by Disney Television Animation (formerly Walt Disney Television Animation), centered on Scrooge McDuck, his great-nephews Huey, Dewey, and Louie, and their adventures across the fictional city of Duckburg and around the globe. Originally inspired by Carl Barks' Uncle Scrooge comic book stories, the franchise launched in September 1987 with an animated television series that served as the flagship program for The Disney Afternoon syndication block.

== Characters ==
Main Article: List of DuckTales characters
