= DuckTales: Remastered =

2013 video game

- Digital artwork
- Developer: WayForward Technologies
- Publisher: Capcom (Note: The mobile version was published by Disney Mobile.)
- Directors: Austin Ivansmith; Matt Bozon
- Producer: Rey Jimenez
- Programmer: Yossi Horowitz
- Artist: Tim Curry
- Composers: Jake Kaufman; Hiroshige Tonomura
- Platforms: PlayStation 3, Wii U, Windows, Xbox 360, Android, iOS, Windows Phone
- Release: August 13, 2013: PS3, Wii U, Windows; NA: August 13, 2013; PAL: August 14, 2013 (PSN); PAL: August 15, 2013 (Wii U); AU: November 14, 2013 (PC); EU: November 15, 2013 (PC) Xbox 360 September 11, 2013 Android, iOS, Windows Phone; WW: April 1, 2015; JP: May 19, 2015
- Genres: Platformer, Metroidvania
- Mode: Single-player

DuckTales: Remastered is a 2013 platform video game developed by WayForward Technologies and published by Capcom. It is a high-definition remake of DuckTales (1989), and was released for the PlayStation 3, Wii U and Windows in August 2013, Xbox 360 in September 2013, and Android, iOS and Windows Phone in April 2015.

The game features a 2.5D presentation with 2D hand-drawn character sprites and 3D modeled levels. Like the original version, the game focuses on Scrooge McDuck traveling across the world in search of five treasures to increase his fortune. Development of Remastered began in 2011, with enhancements being made to the original game's graphics, audio, and bosses. The story content was expanded, and full voice acting was added, featuring performances from the original animated series' then-surviving voice actors and actresses.

Remastered received generally positive reviews. Reviewers praised the game for its gameplay and presentation while criticizing the overabundance of story content.

== Gameplay ==
Scrooge McDuck using his cane as a pogo stick in the Moon stage of the game

DuckTales: Remastered features a 2.5D presentation, with 2D hand-drawn character sprites and 3D modeled levels. The gameplay of Remastered remains identical to the original DuckTales game, with players taking the role of Scrooge McDuck as he travels across the world and beyond in search of five treasures to further increase his fortune. Scrooge can swing his cane to strike or break objects, and bounce on it like a pogo stick to attack enemies from above. This also allows him to reach higher areas, as well as bounce across hazardous areas that would hurt him on foot. Along the way, Scrooge can find various diamonds in treasure chests or in certain areas that increase his fortune, and ice cream or cakes that restore his health. Various characters from the series appear throughout the stages with differing roles, aiding or hindering the player's progress.

Some gameplay tweaks are introduced, such as a map screen on easier difficulties and an easier pogo jump, which can be toggled on and off. DuckTales: Remastered also features a new tutorial level set in Scrooge's money bin, which includes a boss fight against Big Time Beagle, as well as a new final level in Mount Vesuvius where both the final boss fight and race to the top take place. Money gathered in levels can now be used to unlock various gallery items such as concept art and pieces of music, and fill up Scrooge's money bin.

The original game's five levels are featured, all of which have been expanded, and can be played in any order. Each one includes new objectives that must be met to complete the stage, and all of the bosses have new patterns. The game also features a full narrative, explaining the motives and reasoning behind each stage, including how Scrooge is able to breathe on the Moon. Characters briefly featured in the original game, such as Magica De Spell, Flintheart Glomgold and the Beagle Boys play a greater role in the game's plot. The original game's hidden treasures are now found only on higher difficulties, and only one ending is present.

== Plot ==
The Beagle Boys launch another raid on Scrooge’s money bin, with Baggy, Burger, and Bouncer abducting Huey, Dewey, and Louie. Scrooge rescues them and confronts Big Time Beagle, who is caught trying to steal a painting. With Duckworth’s help, Big Time retreats. The painting reveals the locations of five legendary treasures, prompting Scrooge to embark on a global adventure.

Scrooge and Launchpad McQuack first travel to the Amazon in search of the Sceptre of the Incan King. After using eight golden coins to enter the hidden temple of Manco Capquack, they lose the sceptre when the temple collapses. However, the local chief thanks them for restoring the city and gives Scrooge the sceptre—revealed to be the king’s back scratcher.

Next, Scrooge, the nephews, and Webby visit the haunted castle of Drake Von Vladstone (Dracula Duck), heir to the Coin of the Lost Realm. The Beagle Boys, disguised as ghosts, capture the boys, but Scrooge rescues them and solves a riddle from torn papers they carried. Magica De Spell reveals herself, also seeking the coin. Scrooge defeats her and claims the treasure.

In Africa, Scrooge investigates the Giant Diamond of the Inner Earth, where miners fear “hauntings” caused by the subterranean Terra-Firmians and their destructive games. After defeating their king, Scrooge negotiates peace: mining may continue to rid the Terra-Firmians of unwanted “garbage rocks.” The king gives Scrooge the giant diamond as a token.

For the Crown of Genghis Khan, Launchpad crashes the plane in the Himalayas and loses the spare fuel regulators, which rabbits scatter. While retrieving them, Scrooge frees Bubba the Caveduck from ice and discovers that Webby has stowed away. After fending off Flintheart Glomgold and the Beagle Boys, Scrooge confronts a yeti, only to learn it is upset over a thorn—revealed to be the Crown of Genghis Khan.

The final treasure, the Green Cheese of Longevity, lies on the Moon. With Gyro Gearloose’s oxygen taffy, Scrooge, Gyro, and Fenton Crackshell travel there, but Fenton is abducted along with the Gizmoduck suit. After rescuing him, Fenton becomes Gizmoduck, clears the path, and pursues Glomgold and the Beagle Boys. Scrooge claims the cheese but must defeat a mutant rat that ate it before returning safely.

Upon securing all five treasures, Scrooge discovers the nephews have been kidnapped by the Beagle Boys and Glomgold, who demand the treasures in exchange for their release. As Scrooge complies, Magica De Spell appears, revealing she sold Scrooge the painting to trick him into retrieving the treasures, which she needs to revive Dracula Duck. She steals the treasures, turns the Beagle Boys into pigs, kidnaps the nephews, and demands Scrooge’s Number One Dime.

Teaming up with Glomgold, Scrooge tracks Magica to Mount Vesuvius, where the villains betray him, reviving Dracula Duck to destroy him. Scrooge defeats the vampire and saves the nephews, but Magica and Glomgold seize the dime. A final race ensues as the volcano erupts. Scrooge retrieves his dime, escapes the collapsing fortress, and survives while the villains flee empty-handed.

Though the treasures are lost, Scrooge reassures his nephews that the adventure was worth it because they experienced it together. The Beagle Boys and Glomgold are arrested, and Scrooge treats his family to ice cream—splurging “just this once” by buying cones with ice cream in them.

== Development ==
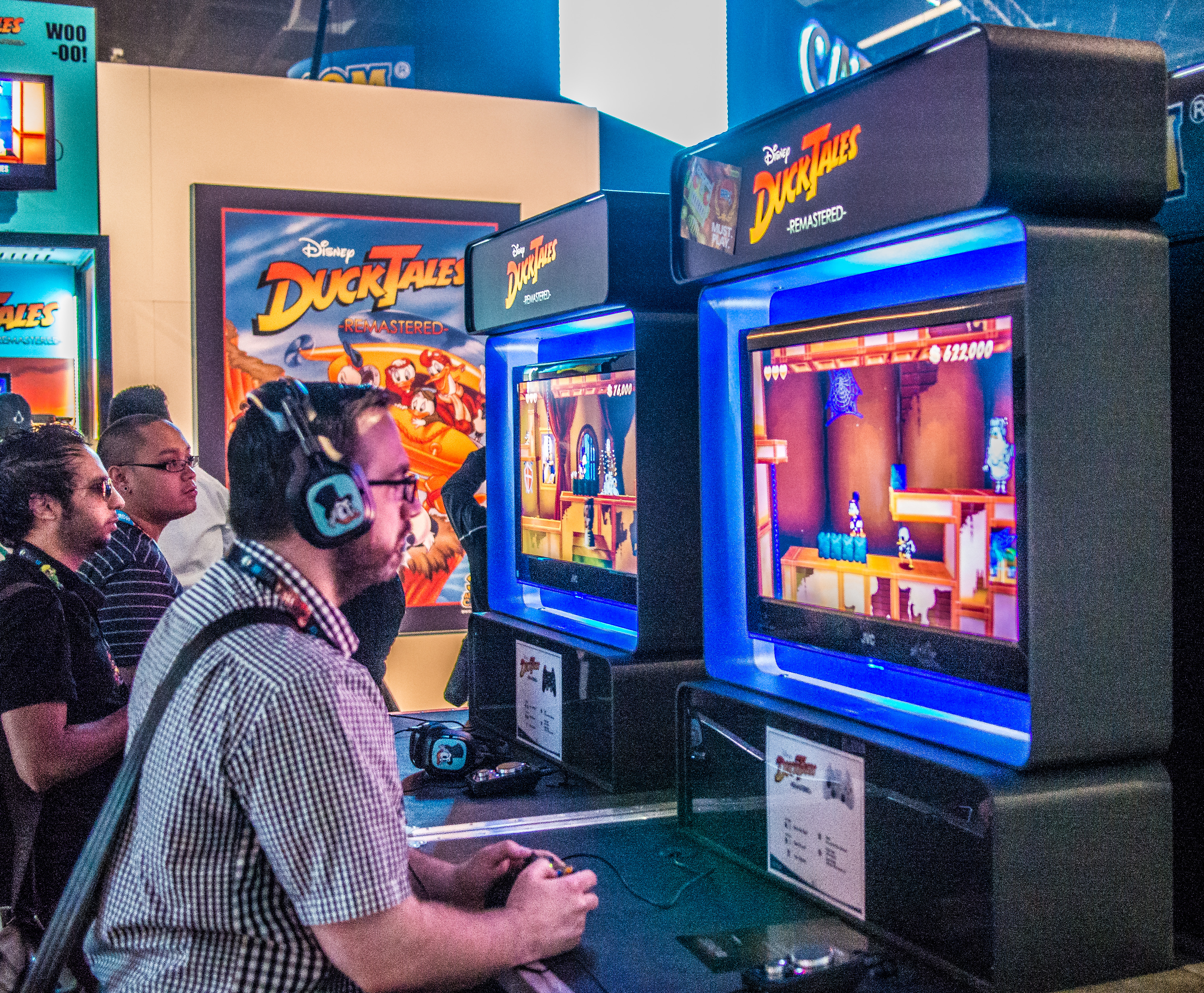
A demo of the game at Electronic Entertainment Expo 2013

Disney and Capcom began discussing the possibility of a DuckTales remake in 2010, and full development began in late 2011. The game's backgrounds and layouts were created by Disney Television artists Mike Peraza and Rick Evans. The game features full voice acting for the characters, with the then-surviving cast of the original series reprising their roles, including Alan Young, June Foray, Chuck McCann, Russi Taylor, and Terry McGovern.

DuckTales: Remastered features new music composed by Jake Kaufman. On making his arrangements, Kaufman said: "I've heard this stuff in my head, as arrangements, since I was 10, so I knew exactly what to do, what I would do, if I got the opportunity and I never took it as a fan. And now I'm taking it as a WayForward guy and it sort of developed all together". He sought to make the pieces more orchestral while adhering closely to the original compositions. The game allows players to toggle between the new soundtrack and the original 8-bit soundtrack after clearing the game once, which includes 8-bit renditions of the newly added compositions. Director Austin Ivansmith added about the sound design: "You can't just make it sound like foley from a movie. There are iconic sounds for jumping and landing and hitting an enemy, that they need a certain punch. Our sound designers just know how to make a perfect gameplay sound, and it just adds to the game significantly. Without it, the game just feels empty". He also revealed that there were no initial plans to include voice acting, but Disney stated a few months into development that some of the original voice actors could be enlisted. As such, the team expanded the script to accommodate the addition.

== Release ==
Capcom first announced the game at PAX East 2013 on March 22. The game was released in North America on the Nintendo eShop, PlayStation Network, and Steam, on August 13, 2013, and an Xbox Live Arcade version on September 11. On August 20, a retail PlayStation 3 version was released that includes a code to download the title and a DuckTales collector pin. A disc-based version was released on November 12 for PlayStation 3, Xbox 360 and Wii U. The game was released for Android and iOS devices as well as Windows Phone worldwide in April 2015. A Japanese release occurred on May 19 the same year. A patch was released for the game that addressed various issues and criticisms, including a "Quick Cinema Mode" that skips the in-game cutscenes, provided the player has cleared the game once. The game was given for free to PlayStation Plus subscribers in January 2015.

For promotion of the game, Capcom sent 150 limited edition, gold NES cartridges with the original game, featuring the Remastered art as the sticker, inside a collectible lunchbox to different members of the gaming press. Also included were recreated ads for some of Capcom's NES games, such as Mega Man 3, a coupon for the "Green Cheese of Longevity" featured in the game and a fake ad for an upcoming cassette soundtrack from the game. All included items were padded into the box by a ground made of actual, shredded U.S. dollar bills. It was revealed in late August that Capcom was giving the remaining press kits away until the release of the game on Xbox Live, through various contests.

In August 2019, the game was temporarily delisted from digital storefronts due to the expiration of Capcom's licensing deal with Disney. For the week ending August 11, the game skyrocketed to third place in the EMEAA sales charts, jumping over 1000 places from the week prior. The game returned to digital storefronts in March 2020.

== Reception ==
Reception

Aggregate score
Aggregator	Score				
Aggregator	iOS	PC	PS3	Wii U	Xbox 360
Metacritic	78/100	66/100	75/100	76/100	70/100

Review scores
Publication	Score				
Publication	iOS	PC	PS3	Wii U	Xbox 360
Destructoid	N/A	N/A	N/A	N/A	8/10
Electronic Gaming Monthly	N/A	N/A	N/A	N/A	8.5/10
Eurogamer	N/A	N/A	N/A	N/A	6/10
Game Informer	N/A	8/10	8/10	8/10	8/10
GameRevolution	N/A	N/A	3/5	N/A	N/A
GameSpot	N/A	N/A	4.5/10	N/A	N/A
GameTrailers	N/A	N/A	8/10	N/A	N/A
IGN	N/A	7/10	7/10	7/10	N/A
Joystiq	N/A	N/A	N/A	N/A	3/5
PlayStation Official Magazine – UK	N/A	N/A	7/10	N/A	N/A
Official Xbox Magazine (US)	N/A	N/A	N/A	N/A	8.5/10
PC Gamer (UK)	N/A	60%	N/A	N/A	N/A
Pocket Gamer	3.5/5	N/A	N/A	N/A	N/A
Polygon	N/A	N/A	N/A	N/A	5/10
Digital Spy	N/A	N/A	3/5	N/A	N/A
Metro	N/A	N/A	N/A	N/A	5/10

The PlayStation 3, Wii U and iOS versions received "generally favorable reviews", while the Xbox 360 and PC versions received "average" reviews, according to the review aggregation website Metacritic. The game's sales were "over-performing" according to Capcom's fiscal year report.

Game Informer's Tim Turi called the PS3 and Xbox 360 versions "a carefully penned love letter that appeals to fans of the ‘80s show" that "blends the cartoon and the NES game together beautifully". Turi added that many of the original game's memorable moments are there but this time they "feel more balanced" and offer up some challenging moments. GamesRadar+'s Chris Hoffman called it "a retro revival done right". GameZone's Josh Wirtanen praised the game's controls in its preview, saying that they were "incredibly smooth". Later on, Mike Splechta of the same website gave it nine out of ten, calling it "a highly entertaining platformer that oozes personality and excellently difficult gameplay". IGN's Colin Moriarty lauded its faithful gameplay but criticized its focus on storytelling. GameTrailers' Justin Speer praised the gameplay and presentation of the PS3 version while criticizing the story elements for interrupting the flow of the game.

The Escapist's Joshua Vanderwall gave the Xbox 360 version four-and-a-half stars out of five and called it "a retro re-release at its finest. The game feels like its classic counterpart, but it has a number of improvements to make it more palatable to a modern gaming audience". The Digital Fix's Luciano Howard gave it seven out of ten, calling it "a renovated and revitalised golden child which when all is said and done shows its age regardless of the effort imparted to hide such truths". However, Digital Spy's Scott Nichols gave the PS3 version three stars out of five: "With DuckTales Remastered, Wayforward attempted to balance authenticity and nostalgia with trying to offer an original experience. The end result feels somewhat confused, getting pulled in both directions at once without ever settling on one or the other". Official Nintendo Magazine gave the WiiU version 62%, stating: "While far from being a bad game, DuckTales Remastered is a huge missed opportunity and a sad day for fans who were expecting so much more". Metro's David Jenkins gave the Xbox 360 version five out of ten and called it "a dream come true for fans of the original but there's nothing here for anyone else, especially given the tiresome new story elements and obnoxious difficulty". Edge similarly gave it five out of ten and stated that the game was handled with a care only a fan was able to give, while criticizing the repetitiveness at the same time.

=== Nominations ===
Year	Award	Category	Result	Ref.
2014	NAVGTR Awards	Animation, Interactive	Nominated	
2014	NAVGTR Awards	Lead Performance in a Comedy (Alan Young as Scrooge McDuck)	Nominated	
2014	NAVGTR Awards	Original Light Mix Score, Franchise	Nominated	
2014	NAVGTR Awards	Supporting Performance in a Comedy (June Foray as Ma Beagle)	Nominated	
2014	NAVGTR Awards	Supporting Performance in a Comedy (Russi Taylor as Webby Vanderquack, Huey, Dewey, and Louie)	Nominated	
2014	NAVGTR Awards	Game, Classic Revival	Nominated	
