= List of DuckTales characters =

Promotional poster for DuckTales (2017), featuring multiple characters from the series.

A range of characters have appeared in the Disney DuckTales animated franchise, including the original 1987 series and the 2017 reboot series, as well as one theatrical movie and a variety of additional spin-off media merchandise, including video games (most notably DuckTales and its updated remake DuckTales: Remastered) and comics. Many of the characters appeared prior to the series in the Uncle Scrooge comic book stories, in particular the ones created by Carl Barks.

== Overview ==
Character	1987 series	DuckTales the Movie	DuckTales: Remastered	2017 series
Scrooge McDuck	Alan Young	Alan Young	Alan Young	David Tennant
Huey Duck	Russi Taylor	Russi Taylor	Russi Taylor	Danny Pudi
Dewey Duck	Russi Taylor	Russi Taylor	Russi Taylor	Ben Schwartz
Louie Duck	Russi Taylor	Russi Taylor	Russi Taylor	Bobby Moynihan
Webby Vanderquack	Russi Taylor	Russi Taylor	Russi Taylor	Kate Micucci
Launchpad McQuack	Terry McGovern	Terry McGovern	Terry McGovern	Beck Bennett
Bentina Beakley	Joan Gerber	Joan Gerber	Wendee Lee	Toks Olagundoye
Duckworth	Chuck McCann	Chuck McCann	Chuck McCann	David Kaye
Mrs. Featherby / Mrs. Quackfaster	Tress MacNeille; Joan Gerber; Susan Blu; June Foray	June Foray		Susanne Blakeslee
Dijon / Faris D'jinn	Richard Libertini	Richard Libertini		Omid Abtahi
Phantom Blot	Frank Welker			Giancarlo Esposito
Poe De Spell	Frank Welker			Martin Freeman
Bubba the Caveduck	Frank Welker		Frank Welker	Dee Bradley Baker
Terra-Firmie King	Frank Welker		Frank Welker	
Baggy Beagle	Frank Welker		Frank Welker	
Bigtime Beagle	Frank Welker		Frank Welker	Eric Bauza
Burger Beagle	Chuck McCann		Chuck McCann	Eric Bauza
Bouncer Beagle	Chuck McCann		Chuck McCann	Eric Bauza
Magica De Spell	June Foray		June Foray	Catherine Tate
Ma Beagle	June Foray			Margo Martindale
Downy McDuck	June Foray			Ashley Jensen
Flintheart Glomgold	Hal Smith		Brian George	Keith Ferguson
Gyro Gearloose	Hal Smith		Chris Edgerly	Jim Rash
Fenton Crackshell (-Cabrera)	Hamilton Camp		Eric Bauza	Lin-Manuel Miranda
Goldie O'Gilt	Joan Gerber			Allison Janney
Donald Duck	Tony Anselmo			Tony Anselmo
Ludwig Von Drake	Corey Burton			Corey Burton
Gladstone Gander	Rob Paulsen			Paul F. Tompkins
Fergus McDuck	Don Messick			Graham McTavish
M'Ma Crackshell / M'Ma Cabrera	Kathleen Freeman			Selenis Leyva
Gandra Dee	Miriam Flynn			Jameela Jamil
Admiral Grimitz	Peter Cullen			
Bankjob Beagle	Peter Cullen			Non-speaking cameo
Babyface Beagle	Terry McGovern			Non-speaking cameo
Bugle Beagle	Brian Cummings			Non-speaking cameo
Doofus Drake	Brian Cummings			John Gemberling
Merlock		Christopher Lloyd		
Gene the Genie		Rip Taylor		Jaleel White
Dracula Duck			Frank Welker	
Della Duck				Paget Brewster
Bradford Buzzard				Marc Evan Jackson
Lena Sabrewing				Kimiko Glenn
Mark Beaks				Josh Brener
Storkules				Chris Diamantopoulos
Drake Mallard / Darkwing Duck				Chris Diamantopoulos
Selene				Nia Vardalos
Zeus				Michael Chiklis
Jim Starling				Jim Cummings
Black Heron				April Winchell
Don Karnage				Jaime Camil
Fethry Duck				Tom Kenny
Zan Owlson				Natasha Rothwell
José Carioca				Bernardo De Paula
Panchito Pistoles				Arturo Del Puerto
Lunaris				Lance Reddick
Penumbra				Julie Bowen
Violet Sabrewing				Libe Barer
Steelbeak				Jason Mantzoukas
Daisy Duck				Tress MacNeille
John D. Rockerduck				John Hodgman
Gosalyn Waddlemeyer				Stephanie Beatriz
Taurus Bulba				James Monroe Iglehart
Manny the Headless Man-Horse				Keith David
B.O.Y.D.				Nicolas Cantu; Noah Baird

== Main characters ==
=== Scrooge McDuck ===
Scrooge McDuck (voiced by Alan Young in the 1987 series, DuckTales the Movie, and DuckTales: Remastered; David Tennant in the 2017 series) is the richest duck in the world, a distinguished citizen of Duckburg, Calisota, the uncle of Donald Duck and Della Duck, the grand-uncle of Huey, Dewey, and Louie Duck, and the main protagonist of the original series and the 2017 reboot series, originally created by Carl Barks for his 1947 story "Christmas on Bear Mountain".

In the 1987 series, Scrooge is constantly seeking ways to further increase his wealth (his favorite pastime appears to be treasure hunting), and to avoid losing it. He is a self-made billionaire who left Scotland in his youth and came to America with his Number One Dime, eventually establishing his home in McDuck Manor and erecting his famous Money Bin. He sports a blue jacket with red cuffs and a red collar. Pat Fraley provided the voice for the younger Scrooge in flashback episode "Once Upon a Dime".

In the 2017 series, Scrooge's Scottish heritage, the Money Bin, and the Number One Dime remain the same, but he is well known as a seasoned "adventure capitalist" and CEO of McDuck Enterprises. Born in Glasgow, Scotland in the mid-19th century and getting rich during the Klondike Gold Rush in the 1890s, his decreased aging has been explained by him spending time "stuck in a timeless demon dimension". In his younger days he used to conduct adventures with his nephew Donald and niece Della joining him. However, Della's disappearance led to Donald cutting off his relationship with his uncle, and Scrooge losing the spark for adventure. Ten years later, as seen in the pilot episode, Scrooge regains his energy when he is reunited with Donald and introduced to his grandnephews for the first time. The reboot sees him wearing a red jacket with visible pockets and black cuffs, spats, and collar, as per his comic book appearance.
According to Frank Angones, several lines involving Scrooge using Scottish slang or dialogue are improvised by Tennant, who is also Scottish, to provide an accurate depiction of Scottish people.

=== Huey, Dewey, and Louie Duck ===
Huey, Dewey, and Louie Duck (all voiced by Russi Taylor in the 1987 series, DuckTales the Movie, and DuckTales: Remastered; Danny Pudi, Ben Schwartz and Bobby Moynihan in the 2017 series, respectively) are the sons of Della Duck, the nephews of Donald Duck, the grand-nephews of Scrooge McDuck and friends of Webby. They were originally created for the comics by Ted Osborne and Al Taliaferro in 1937.

In the 1987 series, the boys are sent to Scrooge to stay with him, while Donald leaves to join the navy. All three tend to be playful and mischievous, while also being devoted members of the Junior Woodchucks scouts. They are identical in appearance and personality, and wear identical outfits – a cap and jumper – with the only difference between each of them being the color of their clothing: Huey wears red, Dewey wears blue, and Louie wears green. The introduction of this scheme by DuckTales was adapted for later use in future animations that featured the triplets. Avery Schreiber voiced the adult Huey, Dewey and Louie in a possible future scenario in the episode "Duck to the Future".

In the 2017 series, Huey, Dewey, and Louie (short for Hubert, Dewford, and Llewellyn) are slightly older, and each have different appearances, voices, and personalities - Huey, wearing a red polo shirt and cap, is the intelligent older brother and a devoted Junior Woodchuck; Dewey, wearing a blue T-shirt with a light blue long-sleeved T-shirt underneath, is the adventurous, courageous and sensitive middle brother, and the one most eager to find out what happened to their mother Della; and Louie, wearing a green hoodie, is the laid-back, money-obsessed younger brother and a resourceful schemer, jokingly described as the "evil triplet". Although all three are mischievous and sneaky around Donald, they are wide-eyed admirers of Scrooge's fortune and the legends of his adventures. Initially, the boys are sent to stay with Scrooge while Donald attends a job interview during "Woo-oo!", but after renewing Scrooge's spirit for adventure and Dewey accidentally wrecking their houseboat, Donald and the boys move into McDuck Manor and accompany him on his new adventures. Della had initially wanted to name her sons "Jet, Turbo, and Rebel" respectively; but Donald came up with their current names in her absence.

=== Webby Vanderquack ===
Webbigail "Webby" Vanderquack (voiced by Russi Taylor in the 1987 series, DuckTales the Movie, and DuckTales: Remastered; Kate Micucci in the 2017 series) is the granddaughter of Mrs. Beakley and a friend of Huey, Dewey and Louie Duck who, like them, also refers to Scrooge as "Uncle Scrooge".

In the 1987 series, Webby visually resembles April, May, and June from the Disney comics. She is characterized as younger than the nephews, despite being the same size. She is a tenderhearted girl, who is always seen carrying her "Quacky-Patch" doll. Her love for animals is a recurring theme, be it penguins, koalas, dinosaurs, or even the Yeti. Webby is typically wearing a pink shirt and a large bow on her head, she is usually rather timid, and often has difficulties being accepted by the boys, although she is also a capable Junior Woodchuck scout.

In the 2017 series, Webby is around the boys' age, being an intellectual nerd and somewhat of an athletic genius, with her character wearing a pink shirt with a blue sleeveless sweater vest, a purple skirt, and a smaller bow on the side of her head. She is also an enthusiastic adventure fan and Clan McDuck historian who idolizes Scrooge and Donald as two of the greatest adventurers of all time. Having spent most of her life sheltered from the outside world by her grandmother, Webby's curiosity drives her towards new experiences as the boys' arrival in McDuck Manor finally causes Beakley to allow her more freedom. While the boys find her slightly intimidating upon their first meeting, they soon accept her as a close friend and surrogate sister, as her optimism and energy often help encourage them. In the series finale "The Last Adventure!", it is revealed that Webby is actually a clone of Scrooge originally named "April", and was created by F.O.W.L. to find the Papyrus of Binding for them until she was rescued and raised by Beakley. Upon learning of this, Scrooge happily accepts Webby as his daughter.

=== Launchpad McQuack ===
Launchpad McQuack (voiced by Terry McGovern in the 1987 series, DuckTales the Movie, and DuckTales: Remastered; Beck Bennett in the 2017 series) is Scrooge's pilot, and an original DuckTales character. He is an able pilot, but is somewhat incompetent and rarely ever lands a plane safely, usually crashing them and walking away without injury.

In the 1987 series, Launchpad uses the motto "If it has wings, I can crash it". He is introduced in the third part of the pilot episode, but has been Scrooge's pilot since his early youth. He is of Irish descent and his ancestor Rhubarb McQuack played an important role in the American Civil War, and prior to the series Launchpad used to perform with his parents and sister as the stunt pilot team "The Flying McQuacks". Aside from being a pilot, he is also a Junior Woodchuck scout leader. His physical appearance is somewhat heroic, with his clothing being similar to that of early era pilots, including a leather cap with flight goggles, an aviation scarf, and a brown flight jacket with light brown pants. He later crossed over as a main character in Disney's Darkwing Duck.

In the 2017 series, Launchpad initially works for Scrooge as his limo driver, before being placed in charge of piloting various craft including the airplane "The Sunchaser", which becomes his signature vehicle. While his physical appearance is the same as his 1987 counterpart, he wears an outfit resembling that of private commercial pilots from the 40s/50s, including a baseball cap, a bomber jacket with a fur lined collar, a green undershirt, and white slacks. The goofy aspects of the character have been enhanced, often giving Launchpad the role of comic relief. Like his 1987 incarnation, Launchpad is a Junior Woodchuck scout leader. He is also an avid fan of the Darkwing Duck show-within-a-show (an allusion to his role in the original Darkwing Duck series), as evidenced by a bobblehead and a series of video tapes he owns as well as his watching the show with the family.

=== Bentina Beakley ===
Bentina Beakley (voiced by Joan Gerber in the 1987 series and DuckTales the Movie; Wendee Lee in DuckTales: Remastered; Toks Olagundoye in the 2017 series), commonly named Mrs. Beakley by others, is the housekeeper and nanny of the household, and the maternal grandmother of Webby. Like her granddaughter, Webby, Beakley is an original DuckTales character.

In the 1987 series, Beakley is seen as a gentlewoman of upper middle age, sweet on her granddaughter, Webby and typically wearing a purple dress and large white apron over her front and having two hairpins to maintain her hairstyle. She is hired by Scrooge as a nanny for the nephews in the third part of the pilot episode, not asking for any payment other than a shelter for herself and Webby. She has been in the line of work for a long time and used to take care of the young Prince Greydrake, and she has proven to be a capable opera singer.

In the 2017 series, Beakley is more down-to-earth than the other residents of McDuck Manor, often offering advice to Scrooge and the ducklings. She is much more resourceful than her 1987 counterpart and has worked for Scrooge for years before the series' had started. Her backstory includes a career as Agent, later Director, 22 of the secret espionage organization S.H.U.S.H., through which she first met Scrooge and adopted his clone, April, as Webby Vanderquack, which led to her retiring as a spy. Though her physical appearance is similar to her 1987 counterpart, with clothing similar to a nanny, and an apron around her waist, she takes offense at being treated as her employer's secretary, and has proven to possess impressive strength. Her nationality has also been changed to British. After years of being overprotective of Webby, the nephews' arrival causes her to agree to let her be a part of Scrooge's adventures. Donald and Della refer to her as "Mrs. B". Beakley and Donald did not get along at first; though when the kids are kidnapped by the Beagle Boys, they join forces and eventually gain respect for each other. Initially, Beakley also dislikes Webby's friend Lena, regarding her as a bad influence, but after Lena saves her life she becomes more accepting of her. Beakley's relationship with Scrooge's butler Duckworth is frosty, due to him criticizing her housework.

=== Donald Duck ===
Donald Duck (voiced by Tony Anselmo) is a signature Disney character, originally debuting in the 1934 animated short "The Wise Little Hen", the nephew of Scrooge McDuck, the older twin brother of Della Duck, and the uncle of her sons Huey, Dewey, and Louie Duck.

In the 1987 series, his appearance was deliberately downplayed to give more focus to Scrooge and the boys. After leaving his nephews with Scrooge to serve with the US Navy, he makes occasional appearances while crossing paths with the rest of the Ducks during their adventures in the first season. In the first-season finale, he returns to Duckburg to serve as best man at Scrooge's wedding to Millionara Vanderbucks. He is not seen in the later seasons, so it is assumed that he was serving the navy full-time or they didn't allow him to go ashore anymore. In the original show Donald wears clothing resembling his current attire but has some minor differences such as the accents on his sleeves are red, he has no bow tie and he wears a white navy sailor hat.

In the 2017 series, Donald's role is significantly increased to involve him in the adventures of Scrooge and his nephews, which included changing a part of his background with his uncle. In the show, he, Della, and Scrooge used to go on their adventures together, until Della's disappearance caused Donald to cut off contact with Scrooge; not speaking to him for the next decade and raising Della's children in her absence. However, ten years later, as seen in the pilot episode, when Donald discovers his nephews' plan to be alone to cause some mischief with their houseboat, he reluctantly reunites with Scrooge to get him to babysit the boys. After a mishap leads him to becoming involved in a new adventure with Scrooge, and losing his houseboat, Donald agrees to move his family to McDuck Manor while still trying to maintain his independence. In addition to increasing his appearance, the reboot also sees him wearing the black sailor suit that he wears in many of the comics upon which the show is based and has some features similar to his 1930s appearance, the white accents, the four buttons and the white sailor hat. Like in the comics, Donald's main character traits are his bad luck and short temper, though he is also trying to be a good parent figure to his nephews. In "What Ever Happened to Donald Duck?!", it is revealed that his anger stems from a fear that the world was out to get him and that no one could understand him. After Della had the boys and taking anger management counseling with Jones, he channeled his anger into protecting his nephews like they were his sons. Additionally, Don Cheadle provides an alternate voice for Donald in "The Shadow War!" and "Quack Pack!" while Russi Taylor and Cristina Vee voice the young Donald in "Last Christmas!" and "The First Adventure!" respectively. Chris Diamantopoulos also provided an alternate voice for Donald in "Moonvasion!" when the sailor imitated a voice for a melon he found to keep himself from going insane.

=== Della Duck ===
Della Duck (voiced by Paget Brewster) is the mother of Huey, Dewey and Louie Duck, the younger twin sister of Donald Duck and the niece of Scrooge McDuck. While the character had initially appeared only in the Disney comics, the 2017 Ducktales series marks her first on-screen appearance in any official animated media.

Before the events of the series, she used to go adventuring with her brother and uncle, and just like how Donald mostly wears a sailor shirt, Della typically sports a pilot's outfit. Her sons grew up without knowing their mother and the first season sees the ducklings – initially Dewey and Webby - investigating her disappearance. Thus; she only appears in photos and paintings throughout most of season one, making her first major appearance within the franchise in a series of flashback stories in issue #2 and #3 of the IDW published DuckTales comic book. The triplets eventually find out that days before they hatched, Della - a passionate pilot and aspiring astronaut - took off with a spaceship built by Scrooge; the Spear of Selene. When she got caught in a cosmic storm, Scrooge tried to guide her through it, but contact with the Spear was lost. Donald, blaming Scrooge for Della's disappearance, cut off all contact with his uncle and raised the triplets by himself, while Scrooge spent years trying to find his niece until his board of directors cut the expenses. In "The Shadow War!", she is shown to be alive and well, though stranded on the Moon and unable to contact Earth. Her fate following the crash is seen in season two – having lost her left leg, she built a prosthetic replacement and she managed to survive using Gyro's Oxy-Chew gum, which provided her with oxygen, water and nutrients, along with her skills as a former Junior Woodchuck. Ten years after the crash she encountered the hidden Lunar civilization of the Moonlanders. She is eventually able to return to Earth, unaware that the Moonlanders have declared war on Earth and that her spaceship has left Earth with Donald on board, and is reunited with her family (except Donald, until the events of "Moonvasion!"). In the series finale, "The Last Adventure!", it is revealed that Bradford told Della about the Spear of Selene to undermine Scrooge. As seen in "Last Christmas", Della and Donald lived with Scrooge at McDuck Manor during their childhood and when annoyed with his sister, Donald used to insult Della by calling her "Dumbella", a reference to her name in the 1938 animated short Donald's Nephews.

== Main antagonists ==
=== The Beagle Boys ===
The Beagle Boys are a large family of dogs who constantly try to rob banks or Scrooge's Money Bin and the show's most frequently appearing antagonists. They were originally created by Carl Barks in 1951, and given individual names, looks, and personalities for their DuckTales incarnation.

The 1987 series version of the Beagle Boys, introduced in the five-part pilot, includes seven main Beagle Boys, with four of them appearing throughout the series:

- Bigtime Beagle (voiced by Frank Welker in the 1987 series and DuckTales: Remastered; Eric Bauza in the 2017 series) – A short, cunning beagle who is second-in-command of the Beagle Boys and leads when his Ma is not around.
  In the 2017 series, he debuts in "Daytrip of Doom!" and is the leader of "the Original Classics". This version is far more dimwitted than the original and is always trying to win Ma Beagle's approval by pulling off grand schemes that go horribly awry.
- Burger Beagle (voiced by Chuck McCann in the 1987 series and DuckTales: Remastered; Eric Bauza in the 2017 series) – A dimwitted yet happy-go-lucky beagle who is constantly hungry.
  In the 2017 series, he debuts in "Daytrip of Doom!" and is a member of the Original Classics. While this version simply grunts, he is slimmer and more intelligent than his '80s counterpart.
- Bouncer Beagle (voiced by Chuck McCann in the 1987 series and DuckTales: Remastered; Eric Bauza in the 2017 series) – A hefty beagle who usually serves as a set of muscles for the group.
  In the 2017 series, he debuts in "Daytrip of Doom!", and is a member of the Original Classics. This version is now the same size as the 1987 series' Bankjob.
- Baggy Beagle (voiced by Frank Welker in the 1987 series and DuckTales: Remastered) – A dopey beagle who dresses in baggy clothes and is most likely the least intelligent member of the group.
  Unlike Bigtime, Burger and Bouncer, Baggy did not appear in the 2017 series.
- Alongside Bigtime, Burger, Bouncer, and Baggy, the first season of the 1987 series also included three additional main Beagle Boys, who each appear in a handful of episodes before making their final, non-speaking, appearance in "Super DuckTales":
  - Bankjob Beagle (voiced by Peter Cullen) – A burly beagle who runs the Beagle Boys when Bigtime and Ma are not around.
  - Babyface Beagle (voiced by Terry McGovern) – A small and clean-shaven beagle who dresses like a little kid with a distinctive propeller beanie.
  - Bugle Beagle (voiced by Brian Cummings) – A lanky beagle with a passion for music and poetry who is also sometimes called Bebop.

In the 2017 series, Babyface, Bankjob, and Bugle belong to a previous generation of Beagles led by Grandpappy Beagle, as seen in "Last Christmas!", in which the trio make a minor, non-speaking appearance.

- Ma Beagle (voiced by June Foray in the 1987 series; Margo Martindale in the 2017 series) – The mother and leader of the gang. She was created for the original DuckTales and modeled after real-life gang leader Ma Barker. Ma has more experience than her boys, and always takes charge when she is around. The 1987 version is introduced in "Robot Robbers", and plays major roles in "Super DuckTales", where she celebrates her birthday, and "The Bride Wore Stripes", where she poses as Scrooge's wife to gain access to his money.
  In the 2017 series, Ma manages a junkyard, as seen in her debut in "Daytrip of Doom!". This version is also portrayed as being much more callous and contemptuous when it comes to her sons compared to the original. In "McMystery at McDuck McManor!", it is revealed that she attempted to steal the deed to Duckburg from Scrooge after he stole it from her "poor, defenseless" Grandpappy Beagle. In "GlomTales!", her first name is mentionead as "Katherine" by Glomgold. In "The Golden Armory of Cornelius Coot!" and "The Life and Crimes of Scrooge McDuck!", the Beagles temporarily took Fort Duckburg and called it "Beagleburg" before Scrooge took the deed back and Ma took control of the Beagles from her father, Pappy Beagle.

The 1987 series included several minor Beagle Boys who do not appear in the 2017 series:

- Bomber Beagle (voiced by Robert Ridgely) – A relatively intelligent beagle and a skilled pilot who appears in the episode "Top Duck".
- The Beagle Brats (voiced by Brian Cummings, Chuck McCann, and Terry McGovern) – Younger versions of the Beagle Boys who appear in the episode-segment "Take Me Out of the Ballgame", where they were coached by Ma Beagle to face the Junior Woodchucks in a baseball game. The characters were originally created in 1965 by Vic Lockman and Tony Strobl as nephews of the main comic book Beagle Boys.
- The Blueblood Beagles – Bonaparte (voiced by Frank Welker), Biceps (voiced by Chuck McCann), and Bearnaise (voiced by Chuck McCann), who physically resemble Bigtime, Bouncer, and Burger, respectively, are aristocratic Beagle Boys who appear in "The Status Seekers" while residing in the posh minimum-security Club Fed Penitentiary prison and assisting Charles Upstart III in finding the Mask of Kuthu-lulu.
- The Early 20th Century Beagles – This previous generation of Beagles, composed of Butch (voiced by Chuck McCann), Wild Bill (voiced by William Callaway) and an unnamed third member (voiced by Michael Rye), were the first members of the family to meet the young Scrooge shortly after he arrived in the United States, as seen in the flashback episode "Once Upon a Dime".
- Megabyte Beagle (voiced by Frank Welker) – A technological genius and the only Beagle whose name does not start with a "B". He appears in two of the five "Super DuckTales" episodes.
- The Beagle Babes – Boom-Boom (voiced by Victoria Carroll), Bouffant (voiced by Jo Anne Worley) and Babydoll (voiced by Susan Blu) - The Beagle Boys' female cousins who kidnapped Webby in the episode "The Good Muddahs".
- The Canadian Beagles – Backwoods (voiced by Danny Mann), Bacon (vocal effects by Frank Welker) and Binky (non-speaking) are a trio of rural Beagle Boys who appear in the episode "Ducky Mountain High" while assisting Glomgold. Although Bacon is a non-anthropomorphic pig, Backwoods – who interprets Bacon's oinks and grunts – insists that Bacon and Binky are twins and that the former "had a bad case of the swine flu as a child".

In the 2017 series, several groups of minor Beagle Boys (all voiced by Eric Bauza) appear in "The Beagle Birthday Massacre!":

- The Glam Yankees – A trio of Beagle Boys dressed as a combination of Colonial Yankees and glam rock musicians.
- The Déjà Vus – A trio of French-themed Beagle Boys introduced as a running gag.
- The 6th Avenue Meanies – A trio of thuggish Beagle Boys, led by Bad Attitude Beagle.
- The 6th Avenue Friendlies – A trio of well-mannered Beagle Boys, led by Benevolent Beagle.
- The Longboard Taquitos – A trio of daredevil-themed Beagle Boys who all speak with surfer accents.
- The Tumblebums – A trio of evil clown-themed Beagle Boys consisting of a muscular clown, a stilt-walker, and an acrobat who primarily communicate by whistling. According to the other Beagles, it has been rumored that they were adopted.
- The Ugly Failures – A trio of dimwitted Beagle Boys regarded by Ma as disappointments due to their lack of success as criminals. This group is composed of Botched Job Beagle, a large chubby member who is shorter than Bouncer; Bungle Beagle; a short member with curly hair; and Bottle Beagle, a scraggy member with crooked braced teeth and hair over his eyes who got his name for constantly getting his fingers stuck in bottles.

Later on in the 2017 series, additional members of the Beagle family (voiced by Eric Bauza) also appear:

- Black Arts Beagle – A Beagle Boy who dabbles in magic who appears in "McMystery at McDuck McManor!" where he shows up at Scrooge's birthday party under his stage name "Nik Nokturne", and unintentionally brings back the ghost of Duckworth. Unlike the other Beagle Boys, Black Arts has gray fur.
- Grandpappy Beagle – Ma's grandfather who stole the deed to Duckburg from its citizens only to lose it to Scrooge. He makes his on-screen debut in "Last Christmas!", where he leads an attack on Scrooge's first annual McDuck Enterprises Christmas party alongside Babyface, Bankjob, and Bugle. According to "The Life and Crimes of Scrooge McDuck!", it was he who stole the deed to Duckburg and temporarily held Fort Duckburg, until Scrooge defeated him in an arm-wrestling match and Ma took control of the gang in response.
- Big Tech Beagle – A technologically literate Beagle Boy, slightly based on Megabyte Beagle from the 1987 series. He appears in the This Duckburg Life podcast of the series.

Additionally, Beagle Boys appear in the IDW comic book adaption of the 2017 TV series:

- Broadway Beagle – A Beagle Boy specializing in set and prop design who appeared in "Welcome to Beagle Island!".
- Backfield Beagle – A football-playing Beagle Boy who also appeared in "Welcome to Beagle Island!".
- Bomber and Butcher Beagle – A pair of ice hockey-playing Beagle Boys who appeared in "The Mighty Ducks of Duckburg!".

=== Flintheart Glomgold ===
Flintheart Glomgold (voiced by Hal Smith in the 1987 series; Brian George in DuckTales: Remastered; Keith Ferguson in the 2017 series) is Scrooge's archenemy, and the second richest duck in the world, created by Carl Barks for the 1956 story "The Second-Richest Duck". Early Barks sketches for Scrooge and Glomgold show remarkable similarities, especially in temperament. While the comics originally depicted Glomgold as a native of South Africa, due to the internationally criticized South African apartheid politics of the 1980s, Glomgold was rewritten to be of Scottish descent for DuckTales.

In the 1987 series, he first appears in the second part of the pilot episode, and typically comes up with schemes to earn money at Scrooge's expense to surpass Scrooge as the world's richest duck.

In addition to his DuckTales role, Glomgold also makes a cameo appearance in the Darkwing Duck episode "In Like Blunt", along with the Beagle Boys and Magica De Spell.

In the 2017 series, debuting in "Woo-oo!", he runs Glomgold Industries and makes his fortune through personal branding; preferring to develop his products as cheaply as possible. In this series, Glomgold is characterized as comically unhinged, to the point where other characters do not take his schemes seriously. Additionally, his aversion towards Scrooge is both personal and professional, as he does not shy away from attempting to kill him and willingly shows up at his wake to celebrate his death. In "The Ballad of Duke Baloney!", after recovering from amnesia caused by the events of "The Shadow War!", it is revealed that Glomgold's birth name was "Duke Baloney", and that he was born and raised in South Africa. After meeting Scrooge, who refused to pay him properly for polishing his shoes in an attempt to teach him self-reliance and hard work, he changed his name to "Flintheart Glomgold" and swore to beat Scrooge in every way possible, including becoming the world's richest duck and proving himself as "the most Scottish" between them. After Glomgold regained his memory, he makes a bet with Scrooge and, throughout the second season, they compete to become richer by the end of the year, with the winner getting the loser's company. In "GlomTales!", Glomgold forms an alliance with several of Scrooge's greatest enemies and Louie in a last-ditch effort to win the bet. He seemingly wins after Louie convinces the other villains to pool their resources with Glomgold's, but he ends up losing everything to Louie because "Flintheart Glomgold" is not his real name and he signed a contract stating everything would revert to his partner, Louie, forcing him to escape from the angry villains after they turn on him. Despite what happened, he returns in "Moonvasion!" to help Scrooge defeat the Moonlanders with one of his insane schemes since General Lunaris had a counter for all of Scrooge's plans, and trick him into returning his company to him.

The name "Duke Baloney" is derived from "the Duke of Baloni", a one-time-only character created by Carl Barks three years prior to Glomgold, and the first character described by Barks as "the second-richest duck in the world".

=== Magica De Spell ===
Magica De Spell (voiced by June Foray in the 1987 series and DuckTales: Remastered; Catherine Tate in the 2017 series) is a powerful Italian sorceress, created by Carl Barks in 1961, and constantly after Scrooge's Number One Dime. Magica is convinced that the dime has magic powers that will help her to gain world domination.

In the 1987 series, she makes her first appearance in "Send in the Clones", living on a distant island inside a volcano in the shape of her head. She speaks with an Eastern European accent, and is often assisted by her brother Poe, who was trapped in the shape of a non-anthropomorphic raven. While she mostly appeared in the show's first season, she makes one final appearance in the season three episode, "The Unbreakable Bin".

In the 2017 series, she is "a vile sorceress with a mysterious, ancient grudge against Clan McDuck" who was trapped in a shadowy form. Throughout season one, Magica pressures her "niece" Lena into gaining the Ducks’ trust so she can steal the Number One Dime and regain her corporeal form. When Lena eventually attempts to come clean, Magica grows strong enough from an approaching eclipse to possess Lena's body and prevent her from doing so. Magica's past is revealed in the season's finale "The Shadow War!": Fifteen years ago, Scrooge sealed her physical form in a pocket dimension within his Number One Dime. At the last second though, she used a spell to create Lena from a part of her shadow, thus remaining in contact with the outside world. In the present, empowered by the eclipse, Magica regains her physical form and traps Scrooge in his Number One Dime while exacting her revenge by attacking Duckburg. After a climactic battle in Scrooge's Money Bin, Magica is defeated by the Ducks and rendered powerless, forcing her to escape. In "A Nightmare on Killmotor Hill!", she returns to haunt Lena and the kids in their dreams using a telepathic helmet as Lena has part of her powers, but was ultimately foiled after Lena destroys her helmet. In "GlomTales!", while forced to work as a birthday party magician, Magica joins Glomgold's alliance to destroy Scrooge and his family, only to be defeated once again. In "The Phantom and the Sorceress", Webby, Lena, and Violet come to Magica for help in training Lena to use her magic to stop the Phantom Blot, which Magica reluctantly agreed to due to his vendetta against her for destroying his village. Once the Phantom Blot was defeated, Magica regained her powers, but is driven off by Lena. In "The Life and Crimes of Scrooge McDuck!", it is revealed that she and Poe once ruled a village together, with the latter ensuring she wasn't too impulsive with their magic. Her first encounter with Scrooge occurred here and she accidentally turned Poe into a raven, who flew off after Scrooge refused to stop him. Magica tried to find Poe, but was unable to and swore revenge against Scrooge.

=== Mark Beaks ===
Mark Beaks (voiced by Josh Brener) is an African grey parrot who is a young tech industry billionaire, the founder and CEO of Waddle, and an exclusive character to the 2017 series. He cares more about his own image and popularity than his fortune, going to great lengths to gain as many followers on social media, keeping several backup phones on hand if any one of them gets destroyed, and stealing others' ideas and passing them off as his own. Debuting in "The Infernal Internship of Mark Beaks!", he takes on Huey and Dewey as interns while Scrooge and Glomgold get annoyed with their new competitor. In "Beware the B.U.D.D.Y. System!", Gizmoduck saves Beaks' life when his autonomous car system, B.U.D.D.Y. (Beaks Unmanned Driver Drone Yay), malfunctions. In "Who Is Gizmoduck?!", he hires Gizmoduck to work for Waddle. Growing jealous of the new star's rising popularity, however, he decides to wear the Gizmosuit himself, but ends up causing mayhem before he is stopped by Fenton. In "The Dangerous Chemistry of Gandra Dee!", he uses Gandra Dee as a spy to get close to Gizmoduck and turn himself into a Hulk-like monster. Dubbing himself "Mega-Beaks", he severely damages Gyro's lab and the Gizmosuit, kidnaps Huey and Webby, and attacks his own company before being confronted by Fenton and Gandra, who manage to defeat him and turn him back to normal. In "Happy Birthday, Doofus Drake!", Beaks found and re-purposed an android he dubbed B.O.Y.D. (Beaks Optimistic Youth Droid) to pose as his son to attend Doofus Drake's birthday party. Louie exposes Beaks' deception, leading Doofus to drop him into his "Honey Bin". In "GlomTales!", Beaks joins Glomgold's alliance to destroy Scrooge and his family, though the alliance is foiled in the end. In "Louie's Eleven!", he attempts to steal his mother Emma Glamour's phone, only to be thwarted by Donald and Daisy. As of "Beaks in the Shell!", his popularity has plummeted and he attempted to steal gizmo-tech once more, only to be foiled.
He has been described by the producers as "Gizmoduck's Lex Luthor".

=== General Lunaris ===
General Lunaris (voiced by Lance Reddick) is a high-ranking Moonlander and an exclusive character to the 2017 series. In season two, he encounters Della during her decade on the Moon. While initially appearing kind and understanding, he is secretly resentful of the Earth due to his father's fear of the planet and the Moon literally living in the Earth's shadow, and intends to one day assert the Moon's dominance over Earth's people. After Della fixes the Spear of Selene and returns to Earth, Lunaris deceives his people into thinking that Della is their enemy, and declares war on Earth. When Donald accidentally ends up on the Moon, Lunaris takes him captive. While overseeing preparations for the invasion, Lunaris' second-in-command Penumbra works against him to foil his plans, but he catches onto her quickly and stops her before she can destroy his rocket fleet. Though he nearly catches Donald, the determined duck manages to escape to Earth in Lunaris' prototype rocket, leading the Moonlander to believe he could not have survived. In the season's finale, "Moonvasion!", Lunaris launches his invasion while developing countermeasures for any plan Scrooge could devise and using a planetary engine to force the Earth to revolve around the Moon. However, due to an unpredictable scheme conducted by Glomgold, he is defeated by the Ducks and Penumbra, leaving his engine adrift in Earth's orbit.

While the Moonlanders' civilization was created for the 2017 series, it is inspired by the Moon Stage of the DuckTales and DuckTales: Remastered video games. The soundtrack of the Moon Stage is also used in several of the show's Moon-based scenes – most notably as a lullaby sung by Della in the episode "What Ever Happened to Della Duck?!" and "Moonvasion!" alongside Louie, who reveals Donald learned the song and sang it to the triplets while Della was missing.

=== F.O.W.L. ===
F.O.W.L., the Fiendish Organization for World Larceny, is a global criminal organization. Inspired by the terrorist organization S.P.E.C.T.R.E. from Ian Fleming's James Bond novels, F.O.W.L. is first introduced in the 1987 DuckTales episode, "Double-O-Duck" (where the "F" stood for "Foreign" instead), when they plotted to destroy all the world's money; leading the Duckburg Intelligence Agency to ask Launchpad to infiltrate their ranks due to his strong resemblance to one of their agents. Their members included Dr. Nogood, Odd-Duck, Bruno Von Beak, and Feathers Galore. F.O.W.L. was later reworked for the Darkwing Duck animated series, appearing as recurring antagonists opposed by the spy agency S.H.U.S.H.

In the 2017 series, F.O.W.L. was founded in the 1960s by Bradford Buzzard and Black Heron after S.H.U.S.H. rejected Bradford's proposal to rein in the world's chaos by taking it over. The organization is introduced during a flashback to the 1960s, when Mrs. Beakley (then known as Agent 22), teams up with Scrooge as part of a S.H.U.S.H. assignment to prevent F.O.W.L. from obtaining the gummiberry juice potion needed to create an army of super soldiers. Following the Moonlander invasion, F.O.W.L. decides that Scrooge and his family are too much of a risk to their organization and the world, and starts planning to eliminate them. Throughout season three, they race against the Ducks to find several lost artifacts after they discovered the legendary explorer Isabella Finch's journal. Their membership is as follows:

- Bradford Buzzard (voiced by Marc Evan Jackson) – The vulture director of F.O.W.L. and head of its High Command. In his youth, Bradford accompanied his grandmother Isabella Finch on her adventures as the first Junior Woodchuck, but grew to despise them due to the various dangers they posed and dedicated his life to destroying them. Years later, Bradford came to work for S.H.U.S.H. as an accountant, but after they rejected his proposal to prevent chaos by taking over the world, he founded F.O.W.L. alongside Black Heron to achieve his goal. After seeing Scrooge as a threat, Bradford infiltrated McDuck Enterprises to end Scrooge's adventuring ways while serving as the company's CFO, and later the chairman of the board of directors. Following the Moonlander invasion and the Ducks finding Finch's journal, Bradford secretly plots to eliminate Scrooge and his family and collect several artifacts that his grandmother never found in order to finally rid the world of adventuring. After Taurus Bulba goes rogue, Bradford is forced to reveal his connection to F.O.W.L., but maintains his ambition to collect the artifacts. In the series finale, "The Last Adventure!", Bradford attempts to defeat the Ducks by forcing Scrooge to sign an anti-adventuring contract and destroy everything associated with adventures with an artificial black hole, including his own agents. Bradford is ultimately defeated when the Ducks find a loophole in the contract, saying that "family is the greatest adventure of all", and turned into a non-anthropomorphic vulture by Magica, as payback for mind-controlling her and the other villains. Throughout the show, he was dismissive of the idea of being considered a villain, insisting his plans were for reining in chaos and ensuring order in the world.
- Black Heron (voiced by April Winchell) – A martial artist, robotics engineer, and chemist turned criminal and an old enemy from Mrs. Beakley's time as a S.H.U.S.H. agent. In the 1960s, she founded F.O.W.L. alongside Bradford and attempted to steal the lost page of the Great Book of Castle Dunwyn to complete the gummiberry juice formula, but was thwarted by Beakley and Scrooge and presumed dead after she was caught in an explosion. Years later, she kidnaps Beakley to exact revenge and complete the formula, only to be defeated by Webby before falling into the ocean. She is later revealed to have survived her fall and rejoined F.O.W.L. to eliminate Scrooge and his family. After several attempts to further F.O.W.L.'s ambitions, she joined Bradford in a plot to rid the world of adventuring in "The Last Adventure!", only for him to throw Heron into an artificial black hole. Despite this, she became proud of him for embracing his villainous side.
- John D. Rockerduck (voiced by John Hodgman) – An Old West robber baron who encountered Scrooge and Goldie while attempting to steal the town of Gumption's enormous gold nugget, only to be thwarted by them. Following this, he used experimental cryogenic technology to live longer and became an agent of F.O.W.L. in the present, while rejuvenating his youth with water from the Fountain of the Foreverglades. In "The Last Adventure!", he joins F.O.W.L. in a plot to rid the world of adventuring, only to be driven off by Mrs. Beakley.
  Originally created by Barks in 1961, Rockerduck is a frequently appearing comic book character, as a present-day business rival of Scrooge's.
  - Jeeves (voiced by Keith Ferguson) – Rockerduck's enforcer and henchman who assisted him in protecting the gold nugget by capturing Scrooge and Goldie until they bribed him into facilitating their escape. Following this, he was artificially reconstructed so he could continue serving Rockerduck in the present. While helping Rockerduck secure water from the Fountain of the Foreverglades, Goldie turns Jeeves into a baby. In "The Last Adventure!", he is restored to his original age and fights against Scrooge, Donald and Della, but is defeated by Mrs. Beakley.
    He was created in the 1970s, first appearing in Italian Disney comics under the name "Lusky". There, he was portrayed as Rockerduck's secretary, who acted as his support on adventures.
- Phantom Blot (voiced by Frank Welker in the 1987 series; Giancarlo Esposito in the 2017 series) – A black-cloaked villain resembling a blot of ink.
  In the 1987 series, he appears in "All Ducks on Deck", when he steals an invisible bomber plane from the aircraft carrier Donald is serving on and plans to create more invisible planes to take over the world.
  In the 2017 series, he is a F.O.W.L. agent disguised as Funso, the mascot of the Funso's Fun Zone amusement center, which also serves as a F.O.W.L. base, and a magic hunter who seeks to destroy anything magical after his village was enslaved and destroyed by Magica decades ago. In "The Last Adventure!", he joins F.O.W.L. in a plot to rid the world of adventuring, only to be defeated off-screen by Lena and Manny.
  The Phantom Blot first appeared in the Mickey Mouse comic strip adventure Mickey Mouse Outwits the Phantom Blot by Floyd Gottfredson, and has since become a recurring enemy of Mickey Mouse in various media. According to Frank Angones, the creative team drew on elements of the original comic character, the 1987 DuckTales version, and the Shadow Blot from the video game Epic Mickey when creating the 2017 incarnation of the Blot.
- Steelbeak (voiced by Jason Mantzoukas) – A rooster agent of F.O.W.L. with a metallic beak and a thug-like personality. In "Double-O-Duck in You Only Crash Twice!", he assisted Black Heron in building and testing her Intelli-Ray, only to grow frustrated with her for insulting his intelligence. He eventually had enough and hijacked her operation to make all of Duckburg stupid, but he was foiled by Launchpad and the Rescue Rangers, who Heron had tested the Intelli-Ray on. In "The Last Adventure!", he uses the Intelli-Ray on himself to stop the Ducks from foiling F.O.W.L.'s plans to rid the world of adventuring, but is defeated and forced to retreat by Launchpad wearing the Gizmosuit.
  He was first introduced as a recurring antagonist in the Darkwing Duck animated series, where he was depicted as a competent member of F.O.W.L.
- Eggheads (various voices) – F.O.W.L.'s foot soldiers.
  They first appeared in Darkwing Duck, in which they were referred to as "Eggmen". They were renamed in DuckTales to reflect their ranks not being exclusively male.
  - Pepper (voiced by Amy Sedaris) – An excitable and talkative Egghead who befriends and becomes partners with the Phantom Blot.

== Supporting characters ==
=== Appearing in both series ===
==== Duckworth ====
Duckworth (voiced by Chuck McCann in the 1987 series, DuckTales the Movie, and DuckTales: Remastered; David Kaye in the 2017 series) is Scrooge's longtime, no-nonsense butler, the jack-of-all-trades of McDuck Manor, and an important member of Scrooge's staff, created for the DuckTales series. Despite having "Duck" in his name, he is actually an anthropomorphic dog.

In the 1987 series, he worked for Scrooge even before the nephews moved in, and was Scrooge's only household servant until the hiring of Mrs. Beakley. He first appears in the first part of the pilot episode, and appears as a supporting character throughout the series, serving both as butler and chauffeur. He plays a bigger part in the episode "Duckworth's Revolt", where he and the nephews get abducted by aliens where he explained the difference between employment and slavery to their fellow prisoners, and in the episode-segment "Take Me Out of the Ballgame" where he acts as the temporary coach of the Junior Woodchuck baseball team.

In the 2017 series, he died years prior to the series' beginning and was mentioned to be the only one who throws Scrooge parties. After accidentally being summoned back to the world of the living by Black Arts Beagle in "McMystery at McDuck McManor!", he rescues Scrooge from Black Arts, Glomgold, Mark Beaks, and Ma Beagle by ejecting them in the form of a shadowy demon, later nicknamed "Demonworth". His ghost has since returned to his duties as Scrooge's faithful butler.

==== Gyro Gearloose ====
Gyro Gearloose (voiced by Hal Smith in the 1987 series; Chris Edgerly in DuckTales: Remastered; Jim Rash in the 2017 series) is a skilled inventor, originally created by Carl Barks in 1952. His inventions often help drive an episode's plot, as they do not always work as designed.

In the 1987 series, he is characterized as a relatively easy-going country bumpkin with super-intellect and everlasting optimism, even when his inventions backfire, but often stretches himself thin with work and feels underappreciated.

In the 2017 series, he is characterized drastically different, being irritable and eccentric, and has a younger appearance than his original counterpart. He works as Scrooge's head of research and development, and for half of the first season, is Fenton's boss. In spite of his arrogance and stubbornness, he has good intentions, even when he and his inventions are wildly misunderstood. In the episode "Astro B.O.Y.D.", his sour personality is later revealed to stem from being manipulated and abused by his mentor, Dr. Akita, and his creation 2-BO's apparent malfunctions. Upon discovering that 2-BO's incident was not his fault and defeating Akita, Gyro resolves to be a better boss to Fenton. Gyro later appeared in "The Last Adventure!" he joined the Ducks in foiling F.O.W.L's plan to rid the world of adventuring.

==== Doofus Drake ====
Doofus Drake (voiced by Brian Cummings in the 1987 series; John Gemberling in the 2017 series) is an acquaintance of Huey, Dewey, and Louie, and an original DuckTales character.

In the 1987 series, he was friends with the boys and Launchpad. He was often seen with the boys during their Junior Woodchuck events, and was also seen with Launchpad, who referred to him as his "little buddy".

In the 2017 series, he is a selfish, insane, sociopathic rich kid after inheriting a fortune from his late grandmother, "Gummeemama" Frances Drake. He forces his parents to work as his servants, invites other people over to hurt them, and breaks things for his amusement. In "Happy Birthday, Doofus Drake!", he invites several people to his birthday party and attempts to take Goldie as his replacement grandmother. However, Louie saves her by reprogramming the android B.O.Y.D. to serve as his brother, who transfers half of Doofus' inheritance to his parents' account, freeing them from his servitude and allowing them to ground him. In "The Life and Crimes of Scrooge McDuck!", Doofus attempts to seek revenge by taking Louie and Scrooge to karmic court and taking Scrooge's fortune away to compensate his enemies. However, Louie makes amends with Doofus, who stands down.

==== Mrs. Featherby / Mrs. Quackfaster ====
Mrs. Featherby (1987) or Mrs. Emily Quackfaster (2017) (voiced alternately by Tress MacNeille, Joan Gerber, Susan Blu, and June Foray in the 1987 series; June Foray in DuckTales the Movie; Susanne Blakeslee in the 2017 series), named Miss Quackfaster in the original comic books, was created by Barks in 1961, as Scrooge's faithful secretary.

In the 1987 series, she is Scrooge's mild-mannered and capable, albeit gossipy, secretary. "Super DuckTales" (non-speaking),

In the 2017 series, debuting in "The Great Dime Chase!", she is the archivist of Scrooge's personal archive, having served him for the last 50 years. Dedicated to the point of obsession, she is perfectly willing to terrorize the ducklings if they refuse to heed her bizarre set of rules. In the second season, she is seen defending the archive from harpies, attending Scrooge's fake funeral, working part-time at Duckburg's public library, conducting tours at Fort Duckburg, and assisting Scrooge in repelling the Moonlander invasion.

==== Goldie O'Gilt ====
Goldie O'Gilt, a.k.a. Glittering Goldie (voiced by Joan Gerber in the 1987 series; Allison Janney in the 2017 series) is Scrooge's longtime love interest and an original Carl Barks character from the 1952 comic book story "Back to the Klondike". The producers of the 2017 series has called her the Catwoman to Scrooge's Batman.

In the 1987 series, she first appears in the episode based on and named after the Barks story, where her origins as a music hall singer in Dawson is shown. She reappears in the episodes "Scroogerello", as a figment of Scrooge's dream, "'Till Nephews Do Us Part", interrupting Scrooge's wedding to Millionara Vanderbucks, and "Ducky Mountain High", where Scrooge and Glomgold fight for Goldie's property, only to see Goldie walking out on top.

In the 2017 series, she first appears in "The Golden Lagoon of White Agony Plains!", as Scrooge's former girlfriend, partner, and rival; out-smarting both him and Glomgold. Alongside Scrooge, she took part in the Klondike Gold Rush in the late 19th century, and explains her advanced age by claiming to have found "a fountain of youth in Ronguay". While she admittingly "always loved gold more than she loved Scrooge", the pair's mutual affection and respect runs deep. In the second season, she first makes a non-speaking appearance at the first annual McDuck Enterprises Christmas party, before returning in a major role in a flashback depicted in "The Outlaw Scrooge McDuck!", in which she joins forces with Scrooge, a time-traveling Gyro, and Fenton's ancestor Sheriff Marshall Cabrera against John D. Rockerduck. In "Happy Birthday, Doofus Drake!", she reappears in the present day after Louie invites her to McDuck Manor to help him become a better con artist, before getting caught up in a scheme to con Doofus Drake out of several million dollars in party favors. Following a series of double-crosses and being held hostage by Doofus, Goldie eventually gets what she came for, but keeps a picture of Louie to remember him by. In "The Forbidden Fountain of the Foreverglades!", she competes with Scrooge to find the eponymous fountain, only to rekindle her romance with him. She was later captured by F.O.W.L. in "The Last Adventure!" but was rescued by the Ducks.

==== Ludwig Von Drake ====
Ludwig Von Drake (voiced by Corey Burton) is an established Disney character, appearing in several Disney animation productions beginning in 1961. Often referred to as Donald's uncle, he is usually described as scientist and self-proclaimed universal expert.

In the 1987 series, he only makes one appearance, as a psychiatrist treating Launchpad in "The Golden Fleecing". However, a near lookalike of von Drake appears in the crowd scenes of some episodes, including a victim of Burger Beagle's prank in "Scroogerello" (which is a noncanonical story as it is presented as Scrooge's dream). The episode "Hotel Strangeduck" features a character named Ludwig von Strangeduck, who is a distinct character but has some resemblance to von Drake.

In the 2017 series, he is an old colleague of Scrooge's, and debuts in "From the Confidential Case Files of Agent 22!", appearing in a flashback segment set in 1968 as the resourceful director of international spy organization S.H.U.S.H. In the present day, Von Drake's children Corvus, Anya, and Klara have taken over some of his duties, including the management of his Arctic "doomsday vault" (inspired by the Svalbard Global Seed Vault), established in case of worldwide disaster. As of the series finale, "The Last Adventure!", Von Drake was captured by F.O.W.L. and forced to help them with their plans, which he claims kept him busy enough to live into the present. He is eventually rescued by the Ducks amidst their final battle with F.O.W.L.

S.H.U.S.H. was first introduced, albeit without Von Drake, as a recurring organization in the Darkwing Duck animated series.

==== Gladstone Gander ====
Gladstone Gander (voiced by Rob Paulsen in the 1987 series; Paul F. Tompkins in the 2017 series) is Donald's cousin, debuting in Carl Barks' "Wintertime Wager" from 1948. Much to his relatives' annoyance, he is unfailingly lucky.

In the 1987 series, he foremost appears in "Dime Enough for Luck", where Magica tries to use his good luck to steal Scrooge's Number One Dime, but he is also seen bidding at an auction in "Dr. Jekyll and Mr. McDuck" and he makes non-speaking cameo appearances in "Sweet Duck of Youth" and "'Till Nephews Do Us Part".

In the 2017 series, he is introduced in "The House of the Lucky Gander!", living in the Macau-like city Macaw where he is a prisoner of Toad Liu Hai until Scrooge, Donald, and the kids manage to free him. In "The Shadow War", he is shown to have returned to Duckburg where his shadow is stolen by Magica De Spell. He later appears in "Treasure of the Found Lamp!", during the nephews' hunt to reclaim D'jinn's lamp, and "Moonvasion!", where he teams up with his cousin, Fethry, to rescue Donald, Della, and the kids before taking them back to Duckburg to help Scrooge stop the Moonlanders. He makes a minor appearance in "The Phantom and the Sorceress!" after the Phantom Blot steals his luck and seeks out Webby, Lena, and Violet's help to regain it. He later made an appearance in "The Last Adventure" where he participated at Webby's birthday party and was seen with his family when Bradford was defeated.

==== Downy and Fergus McDuck ====
Downy and Fergus McDuck (voiced by June Foray and Don Messick in the 1987 series; Ashley Jensen and Graham McTavish in the 2017 series, respectively) are Scrooge's parents. While the mother and father of Scrooge occasionally have appeared or been referred to in the comics, the names Downy and Fergus were created for Don Rosa's 12-part comic book series "The Life and Times of Scrooge McDuck".

In the 1987 series, Scrooge's parents are simply referred to as "MacMama" and "MacPapa", and they appear in flashbacks in the episode "Once Upon a Dime", where they are shown living as farmers in a small cottage. They are also alluded to in the episode "The Curse of Castle McDuck", which also mentioned the family castle being built by Scrooge's great-great-grandfather Silas McDuck, a character who makes his only appearance here.

Initially in the 2017 series, Downy and Fergus only appear in portraits at McDuck Manor, after which they make their proper debut in "The Secret(s) of Castle McDuck!". Due to Scrooge using magical druid stones to rebuild their ancestral castle so his parents could move back in there, Downy and Fergus have become immortal, and the castle is only accessible to the rest of the world once every five years. Scrooge and Fergus' relationship is shown to be a conflicted one, while Downy happily greets her visiting family.

Along with Scrooge's parents, the 2017 series pilot also refers to several additional members of Clan McDuck and the Duck family, including Scrooge's grandfather Dingus and sister Matilda, and Donald's parents Hortense (sister of Scrooge and Matilda) and Quackmore. Several additional ancestors are referred to in "The Secret(s) of Castle McDuck!", and further evolved upon in the tie-in book "DuckTales: Solving Mysteries and Rewriting History!”. Their physical appearances and much of their character traits are taken from "The Life and Times of Scrooge McDuck" and related work.

==== Bubba the Caveduck ====
Bubba the Caveduck (voiced by Frank Welker in the 1987 series and DuckTales: Remastered; Dee Bradley Baker in the 2017 series) is a young caveduck that Scrooge adopts. The character was originally pitched by Tad Stones as "Bubbaduck".

In the 1987 series, he first appears in the five-part episode "Time Is Money", which opens season two. He and his pet Triceratops Tootsie arrive in the present after hiding in Gyro's time-machine, the Millennium Shortcut, and Bubba quickly befriends Huey, Dewey and Louie. To accommodate Bubba, Scrooge builds a replica of his original habitat on the McDuck Manor property, and eventually, he starts attending the same school class as Webby and the boys.

In the 2017 series, Bubba and Tootsie are introduced in "Timephoon", when Louie's latest get-rich-quick scheme involving Gyro's Time Tub causes historical people to appear in the present while sending his family to different time periods. Bubba proves to be highly adaptive, immediately adjusting to life in the future, and is implied to be the original ancestor of Clan McDuck. Meanwhile, Tootsie is re-imagined as an aggressive young dinosaur with no relationship with Bubba due to being from an earlier time period than him.

==== Fenton Crackshell (-Cabrera) / Gizmoduck ====
Fenton Crackshell (1987) or Fenton Crackshell-Cabrera (2017) (voiced by Hamilton Camp in the 1987 series; Eric Bauza in DuckTales: Remastered; Lin-Manuel Miranda in the 2017 series) is an everyday office clerk who accidentally becomes the robotic superhero Gizmoduck. The Gizmoduck character was originally pitched by Tad Stones as "Roboduck" (inspired by the film RoboCop), alongside "Bubbaduck" (which evolved into Bubba the Caveduck) and "Spaceduck" (who never made it to the show), and made his debut in the second season.

In the 1987 series, he doubles as Scrooge's accountant (as himself) and his personal bodyguard (as Gizmoduck), hired by Scrooge in the five-part story "Super DuckTales". He can count at a blazing speed, but he generally is incompetent with almost everything else. Furthermore, his regular dogged attempts to rectify his mistakes tend to make things worse until he ultimately succeeds. He exhibits a remarkably different personality in his role as Gizmoduck (a dual identity only known to Scrooge and Fenton's mother), as his high-powered suit gives him the courage to make daring decisions and act as a strong leader and a hero. Aside from Fenton, other characters temporarily use the Gizmosuit, such as Launchpad, M'Ma, the boys, and Webby. Gizmoduck (Fenton) also makes a few guest appearances in Darkwing Duck.

In the 2017 series, he is re-imagined as a Latin-American intern and semi-competent scientist working under Gyro, and debuts in "Beware the B.U.D.D.Y. System!". While the character remains similar to the 1980s version, this version is more optimistic. After receiving the Gizmosuit, Fenton is hired by Scrooge to guard Duckburg. In "Astro B.O.Y.D.!", Fenton is promoted to full-time and unofficially made a doctor. In "The Last Adventure!", he joined the ducks in foiling F.O.W.L's plan to rid the world of adventuring and also reunited with Gandra, the latter being held prisoner by F.O.W.L.

==== M'Ma Crackshell / M'Ma Cabrera ====
M'Ma Crackshell (1987) or M'Ma Cabrera (2017) (voiced by Kathleen Freeman in the 1987 series; Selenis Leyva in the 2017 series) is Fenton's mother.

In the 1987 series, she is a couch potato who spends most of her time in her trailer home watching soap operas in her bathrobe and her hair constantly in curlers, and debuts alongside her son in the five-part story "Super DuckTales". She then returns to play bigger parts in "My Mother the Psychic", when she gains the ability to foresee the future, "Blue Collar Scrooge", when she begins to date an amnesiac Scrooge, "The Duck Who Knew Too Much", when she takes on the Gizmosuit and saves Fenton from international spies, and "New Gizmo-Kids on the Block", when she accidentally shrinks the Gizmosuit. Additionally, she makes minor appearances in "The Big Flub" and "A Case of Mistaken Secret Identity".

In the 2017 series, she is re-imagined as a no-nonsense Latina detective for the Duckburg Police Department. While she lives an active lifestyle and is deeply concerned with her son's well-being, she is also a devoted telenovela fan, as seen in her debut in "Who Is Gizmoduck?!". She makes non-speaking appearances in "The Shadow War!", "Storkules in Duckburg!" and "Louie's Eleven!", when she is seen foiling crimes. She also has a minor speaking role in "The Dangerous Chemistry of Gandra Dee!", when she gives her son dating advice, and a major role in "Moonvasion!", when she assists Scrooge in repelling the Moonlander invasion alongside her son, to whom she reveals that she always knew about his secret identity since she is a detective and his mother. In "Beaks in the Shell!", she learns of Fenton's relationship with Gandra, and accepts her warmly.

==== Gandra Dee ====
Gandra Dee (voiced by Miriam Flynn in the 1987 series; Jameela Jamil in the 2017 series) is Fenton's love-interest.

In the 1987 series, she was introduced as a minor character in the five-part episode "Super DuckTales", which ended with her and Fenton's first date. Gandra reappears in "Metal Attraction", when she and Fenton have become a couple amidst the robot Robotica's attempts to kill her after falling in love with Fenton as Gizmoduck; "The Big Flub", when she stars in a series of commercials directed by Fenton so he can get promoted; and "The Duck Who Knew Too Much", when she and Fenton accidentally become involved with international spies while on vacation.

In the 2017 series, she is re-imagined as a rebel scientist. Debuting in "The Dangerous Chemistry of Gandra Dee!", she meets Fenton at a tech store and they go on a date, but she is soon revealed to be a spy for Mark Beaks. While initially assisting Beaks, she turns on him when he endangers Huey and Webby and helps Fenton stop him before making a stealthy exit. She is later revealed to be a cyborg after experimenting on herself and an agent of F.O.W.L. Despite this, she maintained her relationship with Fenton and eventually decided to leave F.O.W.L., only to be caught by Bradford and imprisoned in the Library of Alexandria. She was later rescued by Fenton and the Ducks.

==== Dijon / Faris D'jinn ====
Dijon (1987) or Faris D'jinn (2017) (voiced by Richard Libertini in the 1987 series and DuckTales the Movie; Omid Abtahi in the 2017 series) is a Middle Eastern acquaintance of the Ducks, created for DuckTales the Movie: Treasure of the Lost Lamp.

In the 1987 series, Dijon debuted in the film as an inept thief with kleptomania, working for the wizard Merlock. Thereafter, he returns for three of the last five episodes of the series. In the episode "Attack of the Metal Mites", he is seen working for Glomgold, and in the two-part series finale "The Golden Goose", he is reunited with his estranged brother, Poupon.

In the 2017 series, he is re-imagined as a jackal and a fierce adventurer named Faris D'jinn – an ally of Scrooge, noted for being the descendant of an actual genie. He debuts in "Treasure of the Found Lamp!", when he looks for his lost lamp that was passed between Gladstone, Doofus, and Ma Beagle after it was part of a garage sale overseen by Duckworth's ghost. During the Moonlander invasion, Djinn was seen with Amunet and the living mummies fighting the Moonlanders in Egypt.

==== Gene the Genie ====
Gene the Genie (voiced by Rip Taylor in DuckTales the Movie: Treasure of the Lost Lamp; Jaleel White in the 2017 series) is the genie of the titular lamp. As such, he is targeted by the evil sorcerer, Merlock, but eventually ends up becoming a real boy and befriends the kids of McDuck Manor.

In the 2017 series, Gene was trapped in the Lost Lamp of Collie Baba in the year 1990. In "Quack Pack!", amidst the Ducks' search for the lamp, Donald wished for a normal family life, which Gene obliged by erasing the Ducks' memories and sending them into a 1990s sitcom. While the Ducks went through the motions of an episode plotline, Gene made "guest appearances" in commercials and as a photographer. The Ducks eventually realized what happened to them and demand Gene send them back, but he reveals that only Donald can undo the wish since he was the one who made it. Despite Donald initially refusing to do so and the wish fighting to maintain itself when the Ducks try to escape, Donald is convinced to use his second wish to undo the first, and uses his last wish for a framed family photo. Following this, Gene remains behind in his treasure cavern before he is kidnapped by F.O.W.L. and eventually rescued by the Ducks.

==== Poe De Spell ====
Poe De Spell (voiced by Frank Welker in the 1987 series; Martin Freeman in the 2017 series) is Magica's brother and familiar, always seen in the shape of a non-anthropomorphic raven, and assisting her in three episodes. In Poe's debut episode, "Send in the Clones", it is stated that he was somehow permanently transformed into a raven and cannot be turned back by conventional magic. His name is a reference to the author Edgar Allan Poe, and Poe often ends his stanzas with the word "nevermore", quoting the poem "The Raven".

Poe appears in a flashback in the 2017 series episode "The Life and Crimes of Scrooge McDuck!" Unlike his 1987 counterpart, Poe is initially presented as an anthropomorphic duck instead of a raven and was Magica's twin brother. Together with her, Poe ruled over a small village and terrorized its people, keeping Magica in check and making sure she did not go overboard with her magic. During a battle with the De Spells, Scrooge riled up Magica, causing her to ignore her brother's warnings and accidentally transform Poe into a non-verbal, non-anthropomorphic raven. Despite Magica begging for help, Scrooge allowed Poe to fly out of a broken window, never to be seen again. A grieving Magica swore vengeance against Scrooge and merged Poe's discarded amulet with her own to form her staff.

=== Exclusive to the 1987 series ===
- Admiral Grimitz (voiced by Peter Cullen) – The navy commander on the aircraft carrier that Donald is a midshipman on. He always gets annoyed at Donald's accident-prone stunts, and likes to play with military equipment that makes things "go kablooey". After making a non-speaking cameo appearance in the first part of the pilot episode, he makes his proper debut in "Sphinx for the Memories", and returns alongside Donald throughout the first season. Due to Donald staying with his uncle, Grimitz is the only supporting character from the original series not to appear in the reboot.

=== Exclusive to the 2017 series ===
- Lena Sabrewing (voiced by Kimiko Glenn) – A street smart and seemingly carefree teenage girl introduced in "The Beagle Birthday Massacre!", when she befriends Webby. However, she was secretly attempting to win the Ducks' trust to gain access to Scrooge's Number One Dime on behalf of her "aunt", Magica De Spell. As season one progressed, Lena became increasingly torn between her aunt's villainous schemes and her growing friendship with Webby. When Lena eventually decides to side with the Ducks, Magica grows strong enough to possess her body moments before she has the chance to tell Scrooge the truth. In the season's finale, the kids discover that she is actually a shadow created by Magica to get revenge on Scrooge and free herself. During the final battle, Lena is able to fight against Magica, but ends up sacrificing herself to protect Webby. During season two, Lena continued to watch over Webby from the "shadow realm", and with the help of her newfound friend Violet, Webby is able to bring Lena back to the world of the living. In "A Nightmare on Killmotor Hill!", Lena struggles with nightmares of becoming Magica as she is still her shadow and plans a slumber party for Webby, Violet, and the boys to keep herself awake. After accidentally trapping them in a shared dream with Magica's powers and nearly losing herself when Magica invades the dream, her friends are able to save her and foil Magica, helping her realize she does not need Magica and overcome her fears. As of season three, Lena has moved in with Violet's family and mastered her magic after training under Magica.
  To conceal Lena's connection to Magica, she was originally referred to by the placeholder name of Lena LeStrange.
- Greek gods – Old acquaintances of Donald, Della, and Scrooge. The trio is introduced in "The Spear of Selene!" when the Ducks visit Ithaquack, their home island in the Mediterranean Sea. Following this, they also make minor appearances throughout the series.
  - Storkules (voiced by Chris Diamantopoulos) – The god of strength and heroes who is physically imposing, noble, and pure-hearted, but also naïve and somewhat clueless. He idolizes Donald, who finds Storkules' well-meaning gestures invasive. In season two, he moves to Duckburg to become Donald's tenant after being kicked out of his home by his father. When the Moonlanders invade, Zeus recalled Storkules to Ithaquack and forbade him to help Donald or Scrooge. After tying up Zeus off-screen, Storkules helps set the Earth back in orbit with his strength after the Moonlanders attached a planetary engine to make it revolve around the moon. In "The Last Adventure!", he was captured by F.O.W.L. but was later rescued by the Ducks.
  - Selene (voiced by Nia Vardalos) – The goddess of the moon, Storkules' sister and a dear friend of Della's, who named The Spear of Selene in her honor. She also appears in "Treasure of the Lost Lamp!" after Scrooge, Webby, and D'jinn visit Ithaquack. She later appeared in "The Last Adventure!" where she was captured by F.O.W.L. but was later rescued by the Ducks.
  - Zeus (voiced by Michael Chiklis) – The king of the gods and the god of thunder and hospitality as well as the brother of Hades and father of Storkules and Selene who suffers from an inferiority complex towards Scrooge. Additionally, he makes a minor appearance in "The Golden Spear!", wherein he attacks Storkules and Dewey for stealing Hermes' winged sandals. In "Moonvasion!", Zeus prevents his offspring from helping Scrooge fight the Moonlanders, but they stand up to him and tie him up off-screen to help the Ducks restore Earth. In "New Gods on the Block!", Zeus is temporarily stripped of his powers. While he eventually regains them, he accidentally casts himself to Hades' realm. In "The Last Adventure!", he was captured by F.O.W.L. but was later rescued by the Ducks.

While the trio is a 2017 series creation based on Roman hero Hercules, the Moon goddess Selene, and the Greek deity Zeus, the island of Ithaquack (based on Homer's Ithaca) first appeared in the 1987 series.

- Jim Starling / Negaduck (voiced by Jim Cummings) – An actor and the former star of the live-action superhero television series, Darkwing Duck, a show-within-a-show where he played the title character. Launchpad, who grew up watching the show and considers himself its biggest fan, describes Starling as "an old school actor who did all his own stunts". While initially only appearing as the Darkwing Duck character, Starling is introduced in "The Duck Knight Returns!", as a cynical faded star who is upset to learn that McDuck Studios is rebooting the franchise and replacing him with a younger actor named Drake Mallard. As his plans to regain the role fail, he finally loses his mind and attempts to kill his successor, only to seemingly perish himself. Unbeknownst to the world, he survived and has begun plotting his revenge, now sporting a discolored costume.
  The actual animated Darkwing Duck series originally aired from 1991 to 1992, as a spin-off of the original DuckTales series, with Launchpad as the title character's sidekick. Starling's name was chosen by the producers as a nod to voice actor, Jim Cummings, who voiced both Darkwing Duck in the original series, as well as DuckTales’ Starling. Starling's altered costume notably mirrors that of arch-villain Negaduck of the animated series; a character also voiced by Cummings. Although DuckTales–Darkwing Duck crossover comic books have been produced, this marks the first occurrence of Darkwing in DuckTales animation.
- Don Karnage (voiced by Jaime Camil) – The arrogant and vain leader of a band of sky pirates who are based on an air carrier called The Iron Vulture. He is introduced in "Sky Pirates...in the Sky!", when he encountered the Ducks and swore vengeance against Dewey for upstaging him. In "GlomTales", Glomgold recruits Karnage to help him destroy Scrooge and his family, which he accepts under the condition that he can finish off Dewey, though the alliance is defeated in the end. In "The Lost Cargo of Kit Cloudkicker!", F.O.W.L. hires Karnage to find the Stone of What Was, but he runs afoul of Kit, Della, Huey, and Dewey. While his enemies get the stone, Karnage procures a small fragment of it. In the series finale "The Last Adventure!", he joins F.O.W.L. in a plot to rid the world of adventuring and faces Dewey in a dogfight until they end up crashing.
  Karnage originated as the main antagonist of the 1990s animated series, TaleSpin.
- Fethry Duck (voiced by Tom Kenny) – Donald's energetic and rather peculiar cousin, introduced in "The Depths of Cousin Fethry!", when he serves as a caretaker at one of McDuck Enterprises' marine science stations. He is visited by Huey and Dewey, who mistake him for a scientist. However, his years of living around the marine science stations have made him an expert in adapting to underwater life and communicating with sea creatures, and the episode ends with him leaving to become an actual scientist after being reunited with his pet krill, Mitzi; who had been mutated to colossal size due to hydrothermal vents. In "Moonvasion!", he and Mitzi team up with Gladstone to save Donald, Della, and the kids from the island before taking them back to Duckburg and helping Scrooge repel the Moonlander invasion. He later appeared in "The Last Adventure!" where he participated at Webby's birthday party and was seen with his family when Bradford was defeated. Fethry also reappeared in the comic book story "Saga of the Super-Intern!", published in the 20th issue of IDW's DuckTales, where he is hired as an intern at Gyro's lab.
  Cousin Fethry was originally created as a "beatnik" character in 1964, by comic book creators Dick Kinney and Al Hubbard.
- Zan Owlson (voiced by Natasha Rothwell) – A graduate student of the Mouseton School of Business who became the acting CEO of Glomgold Industries during Glomgold's four-month disappearance, following Magica's attack in "The Shadow War!". Unlike Glomgold, she is both honest and a capable businesswoman. After his return, she remains at the company as his closest associate during his year-long competition to overthrow Scrooge as the richest duck in the world, even in spite of his manic, childish behavior. She soon transfers over to McDuck Enterprises when it seems like Scrooge is going to win, but she ends up working for Louie after he gets both Scrooge and Glomgold's fortunes at the end of the competition. Following an attack by the Bombie, she snaps under the pressure and quits. As of "Let's Get Dangerous!", she became the mayor of St. Canard.
  An original DuckTales character, Zan Owlson is named after series producer, Suzanna Olson.
- José Carioca and Panchito Pistoles (voiced by Bernardo De Paula and Arturo Del Puerto, respectively) – Donald's college friends and fellow members of their band, The Three Caballeros, who used to practice in Scrooge's garage. They first appear in "The Town Where Everyone Was Nice!", when the trio reunites, and José and Panchito are introduced to the kids. Wanting to impress the others, José claims to be a successful travel agent and Panchito fakes being a pop star, although they are eventually revealed to be a flight attendant and birthday party performer, respectively. In "Louie's Eleven!", they attempted to infiltrate a party held by Emma Glamour alongside Donald to increase their popularity. The two were later seen in "The Last Adventure" where they participated at Webby's party but were later captured by F.O.W.L. but were freed by the Ducks.
  José and Panchito have appeared in several animated productions alongside Donald, starting in the 1940s feature films Saludos Amigos and The Three Caballeros. De Paula and Del Puerto improvised several lines involving the characters' native languages to provide accurate Brazilian and Mexican depictions.
- Lieutenant Penumbra (voiced by Julie Bowen) – A Moonlander and Lunaris' most trusted officer. She is fiercely protective of the moon and its people. As such, she initially perceived Della as a threat; treating her with distrust and distaste despite her repeated attempts to win Penumbra's friendship. Over time, she begins to warm up to Della and comes to disagree with Lunaris' manipulation of their people into war with Earth. After Donald ends up on the moon and gets taken prisoner, she secretly frees him so he can help her stop Lunaris by destroying his fleet; in the process discovering that her commanding officer had planned to invade Earth long before Della came. Just as she gives Donald a transmitter to warn Earth, she's subdued by Lunaris and prevented from helping Donald further. Despite what happened, she ultimately manages to send a warning to Della and later assists her and her family in disabling Lunaris' engine. Penumbra spent the following months trying to repair her ship and take her people back to the Moon, only to learn that they want to stay on Earth. While initially reluctant to do so as well, she was convinced after saving Webby and Dewey from the collapsing "Flintferris Glomwheel". In "The Last Adventure!" she was captured by F.O.W.L but later rescued by the Ducks.
  An original DuckTales creation, the character is a lesbian according to writer Sam King.
- Violet Sabrewing (voiced by Libe Barer) – A book-smart girl who shares Webby's interests in the supernatural and helps bring Lena back from the shadow realm, as seen in her debut, "Friendship Hates Magic!" In "Challenge of the Senior Junior Woodchucks!", she competes with Huey for the title of "Senior Woodchuck". The episode also reveals her fathers are a same-sex couple named Indy and Ty Sabrewing. Violet also makes minor appearances in "Happy Birthday Doofus Drake!", "A Nightmare on Killmotor Hill!", "Moonvasion!", "The Split Sword of Swanstantine!", and "The Last Adventure!"
- Drake Mallard / Darkwing Duck (voiced by Chris Diamantopoulos) – An up-and-coming actor who replaces Jim Starling as Darkwing Duck in McDuck Studios' reboot film. He and Launchpad form a strong friendship due to their shared love of the Darkwing Duck series. When Starling unsuccessfully attempts to kill him and the production fails, Launchpad convinces Drake to become a real-life superhero. In "Moonvasion!", Drake assists Scrooge in staging a rebellion against Lunaris and the Moonlanders' invasion and then helps Scrooge get to his manor by switching outfits with him since Drake himself was perceived as unremarkable by the aliens. As of "Let's Get Dangerous!", he moved to St. Canard and set up a secret lair to continue fighting crime. In "The Last Adventure!", he joins the Ducks in foiling F.O.W.L.'s plans to rid the world of adventuring.
  Drake shares his name with that of Darkwing Duck's civilian identity in the 1990s animated series.
- B.O.Y.D. (voiced by Nicolas Cantu in season two; Noah Baird in season three) – A childlike android introduced in "Happy Birthday, Doofus Drake!" as the "Beaks Optimistic Youth Droid". After Beaks found him in a junkyard, he used B.O.Y.D. to increase his social media clout and con Doofus Drake out of millions of dollars before Louie exposed the ruse. After Louie gave the android to Doofus as a little brother, B.O.Y.D. took half of his inheritance money, allowing Doofus' parents to stand up to him. In season three, B.O.Y.D. joined the Junior Woodchucks, befriended Huey, and discovered his past. Originally, he was 2-BO, a childlike defense drone created by Gyro decades ago before his mentor Dr. Akita tampered with his programming and made him destroy Tokyolk before abandoning him. Despite B.O.Y.D. falling under Akita's control again in the present, Gyro reconciled with the android and helped him gain control of his programming to live a normal life, even changing his acronym to "Be Only Yourself, Dude" to reflect this. In "The Last Adventure!", he joins the Ducks in foiling F.O.W.L.'s plans to rid the world of adventuring. B.O.Y.D. is heavily inspired by the character Astro Boy, with his original name "2-BO" being based on "Tobio", the name of the human child whom Astro Boy was designed after.
- Daisy Duck (voiced by Tress MacNeille) – Emma Glamour's assistant who, much like Donald, is prone to angry outbursts. Debuting in "Louie's Eleven!", she attempts to ensure Glamour's party runs smoothly, only to get trapped in an elevator with Donald while he was helping his band, the Three Caballeros, perform at the party. They end up developing a mutual attraction for one another and work together to escape and defeat a band of criminals that infiltrated the party. They later become a couple in "New Gods on the Block!".
  Daisy is Donald's longtime girlfriend in various Disney media, first introduced in the 1940 animated short Mr. Duck Steps Out; with her DuckTales design taking inspiration from her appearance in Donald's Diary. While she was absent from the original DuckTales series, the 2017 series' incarnation is notable in that she and Donald meet for the first time and eventually enter a relationship. She was originally set to appear in "The Infernal Internship of Mark Beaks" as Glomgold's assistant and Donald's ex-girlfriend, but the idea was scrapped due to both story purposes and perceived similarities with Donald and Scrooge's background. She was also considered to appear in an earlier draft for the season two premiere, with her characterization based on her Quack Pack incarnation, but the idea was dropped when the episode's storyline changed.

== Minor characters ==
=== Appearing in both series ===
- The Terra-firmians – A race of underground rolling creatures, created by Carl Barks as "the Terries and the Firmies" for his 1956 comic story Land Beneath the Ground!.
  In the 1987 series, they are led by an unnamed Terra-firmian king (voiced by Frank Welker, who reprises the role in DuckTales: Remastered) and trigger earthquakes underneath the Money Bin in the episode "Earth Quack". Additional Terra-firmians were voiced by Joan Gerber and Chuck McCann.
  In the 2017 series, skeptic Huey and believer Webby debate their existence until they run into a couple of them (voiced by Fred Tatasciore and Cree Summer) in Duckburg's old subway system, as seen in "Terror of the Terra-firmians!".
- Captain Farley Foghorn (voiced by Frank Welker in the 1987 series; Eric Bauza in the 2017 series) – A goofy captain who works for "Temp Cap" ("Temporary Captain Service") and who is occasionally hired by Scrooge.
  He appears in the 1987 series episodes "Bermuda Triangle Tangle" and "The Uncrashable Hindentanic".
  In the 2017 series, Captain Foghorn makes a minor appearance as an attendee of Scrooge's first annual McDuck Enterprises Christmas party in "Last Christmas!".
- Webra Walters (voiced by Joan Gerber in the 1987 series, Kari Wahlgren in the 2017 series) – A snooty reporter, based on Barbara Walters. She speaks with a rhotacism similar to Elmer Fudd from Looney Tunes.
  After her debut in the 1987 series episode "Send in the Clones", wherein she visits McDuck Manor to make a report about Scrooge's everyday life, she makes minor reappearances throughout the series. Besides DuckTales, she also appears in the Darkwing Duck episodes "Up, Up and Awry", "The Quiverwing Quack", and "Paint Misbehavin'", albeit without Gerber reprising the role.
  In the 2017 series, Walters makes a cameo in a flashback to an encounter between Scrooge and Glomgold in the 1980s.

=== Exclusive to the 1987 series ===
- El Capitán (voiced by Jim Cummings) – A former Spanish galleon captain whose insane greed for gold has kept him alive for four centuries. In the five-part pilot episode, he competes with Scrooge and Glomgold in a race to find the treasure of the Golden Suns.
- The Police Chief of Duckburg (voiced by Peter Cullen in "Robot Robbers" and "Ducky Horror Picture Show", Hal Smith in "Duckman of Aquatraz", "Full Metal Duck", "The Billionaire Beagle Boys Club", "My Mother the Psychic", "The Bride Wore Stripes", and "Attack of the Fifty-Foot Webby", Chuck McCann in "Raiders of the Lost Harp", Brian Cummings in "Blue Collar Scrooge") – The Police Chief of Duckburg who appears with two different designs throughout the show; a police chief with features similar to Chief O'Hara in the Mickey Mouse comics, and the prison warden of the high security prison Aquatraz.
- Vacation Van Honk (voiced by Frank Welker in "Magica's Shadow War", Barry Dennen in "Sir Gyro de Gearloose") – A background character who dresses like a tourist. He appears sporadically throughout the series, with lines spoken in the season one episodes "Magica's Shadow War" (voiced by Welker) where he literally runs into Magica, and "Sir Gyro de Gearloose" (voiced by Dennen) where he appears as one of Gyro's dissatisfied customers. He bears a slight resemblance to the comics character Gus Goose.
- Benzino Gassolini (voiced by Gino Conforti) – An Italian playboy, champion race-car driver, famed pilot, and a skilled pizza baker. He appears in the episodes "Hotel Strangeduck" and "Top Duck".
- Lord Battmountain (voiced by Chuck McCann) – The president of the Duckburg Explorers Club, of which Scrooge is a member. He appears in the episodes "Lost Crown of Genghis Khan" and "Pearl of Wisdom". His name is a play on Lord Mountbatten.
- Quacky McSlant – A non-speaking background character who appears in the season one episodes "Maid of the Myth", "Sweet Duck of Youth", and "Home Sweet Homer". He sports a tilted body, and sometimes wears a sweater with a Q on it. In "Home Sweet Homer" he works as a mail carrier.
- Pete (voiced by Will Ryan) – A well-established Disney villain who makes four appearances in season one as four separate characters. In "Pearl of Wisdom" he appears as Sharkey and competes with Scrooge in a race to find the titular pearl. In "Merit Time Adventure", he appears as Dogface Pete, a grumpy but ultimately friendly sailor. In "Time Teasers", he appears as Captain Blackheart, a 17th-century pirate. Finally, in "Duck in the Iron Mask", he appears as Captain Pietro, Count Ray's menacing captain of the guard. Although Pete didn't appear in the reboot, he is implied to exist in it as his son, P.J, from Goof Troop made a photograph cameo in "Quack Pack" when Goofy was having a heart-to-heart with Donald.
- The Grand Kishki (voiced by Hamilton Camp) – The ruler of the country of Macaroon who discovers a rare glowing fruit. He appears in the first and fourth parts of the serial "Catch as Cash Can".
- Mr. Wimpleman (voiced by Tony Anselmo in "A Whale of a Bad Time", Corey Burton in "Dime Enough At Last") – Scrooge's mild-mannered accountant, who appears in "Catch as Cash Can" and "Dime Enough for Luck".
- Gloria Swansong (voiced by Joan Gerber) – An aging Hollywood star and spoof of Gloria Swanson who travels in the Hindentanic blimp in the hopes of gaining the interest of Irwin Mallard in "The Uncrashable Hindentanic" and attends Scrooge's wedding in "Till Nephews Do Us Part".
- John D. Rockefeather (voiced by Hal Smith) – A wealthy Duckburg socialite who appears in "The Uncrashable Hindentanic" and "Super DuckTales". He is not to be confused with John D. Rockerduck.
- Lady de Lardo (voiced by Joan Gerber) – A Duckburg socialite and member of the Association of Status Seekers who appears in "The Status Seekers" and "Super DuckTales".
- Mrs. Quackenbush (voiced by Joan Gerber in "Nothing to Fear", Russi Taylor in "Time is Money", Susan Blu in "Allowance Day", Tress MacNeille in "Bubba's Big Brainstorm") – The teacher of Huey, Dewey and Louie, and later Bubba. While she prominently appears in "Time Is Money", "Allowance Day", and "Bubba's Big Brainstorm", she first appears in "Nothing to Fear" as a nightmare creature created by Magica.
- Screamin' Sky McFly (voiced by Terry McGovern) – A Duckburg pop star and television personality, idolized by the nephews whose voice is heard in "Time Is Money" and appears physically in "Beaglemania".
- Buffy Parvenu (voiced by Joan Gerber) – The chairwoman of the Duckburg Rose Society and a Duckburg philanthropist. She appears in "Time Is Money" and "The Masked Mallard".
- The Manager of Feather Federal Savings (voiced by Don Hills) – The unnamed, somewhat unhinged, manager of Feather Federal Savings, one of Scrooge's Duckburg banks. He appears in "Time Is Money". and "Dough Ray Me".
- The Mayor of Duckburg (voiced by Chuck McCann) – The unnamed Mayor of Duckburg and an anthropomorphic pig. He appears in "Super DuckTales" and "The Masked Mallard".
- Oprah Webfeet (voiced by Tress MacNeille) – A talk show host and parody of Oprah Winfrey who appears in the episodes "The Big Flub" and "A Case of Mistaken Secret Identity". MacNeille also voiced a similar character called Opal Windbag, who appears in the Darkwing Duck episodes "Twitching Channels" and "Dead Duck".
- Dr. Von Swine (voiced by Howard Morris) – A physician who runs a free clinic in Duckburg. Scrooge seeks his advice in "Yuppy Ducks", and calls for him when Webby is drastically enlarged in "Attack of the Fifty-Foot Webby".
- Walter Cronduck (voiced by Alan Oppenheimer in "Allowance Day", Chuck McCann in "The Big Flub", Frank Welker in "Attack of the Metal-Mites" and "New Gizmo-Kids on the Block") – A television news reporter based on Walter Cronkite. He plays a role similar to Webra Walters' and appears in season three onwards.
- Poupon (voiced by Frank Welker) – The leader of the Brotherhood of the Goose, protectors of the ancient Golden Goose artifact. While he is Dijon's brother, Poupon is an honest and devoted man. He appears in the two-part series finale, "The Golden Goose". Like his brother, he shares his name with a type of French mustard.

=== Exclusive to the 2017 series ===
- Manny the Headless Man-Horse (voiced by Keith David) – A headless horse who is introduced in "Woo-oo!", as one of the monsters in Scrooge's garage. After receiving a head cut off from a statue of Scrooge, Manny is rehabilitated, and recurs as an intern in Gyro's lab. Being a headless horse, he does not speak and can only communicate by clapping his hooves. In the series finale, "The Last Adventure!", he is revealed to be the "Headless Man-Horse of the Apocalypse" and reluctantly assumes his true form and helps the Ducks defeat F.O.W.L.
  Several elements of Manny's true form are inspired by Goliath, the lead character of the animated series Gargoyles, who was also voiced by David.
- Gabby McStabberson (voiced by Jennifer Hale) – A trained assassin who was raised by warrior monks and serves as Glomgold's henchwoman as seen in her debut episode, "Woo-oo!" She later makes minor appearances during "The Shadow War!", "Moonvasion!", and "Louie's Eleven".
- Hack and Slash Smashnikov (voiced by Jason Marsden and Sam Riegel, respectively) – Twin wolf mercenaries who initially appeared as Glomgold's henchmen in the pilot episode before making minor reappearances throughout the series.
- Roxanne Featherly (voiced by Kari Wahlgren) – A green-feathered duck working as a news reporter in Duckburg, taking over the role held by Webra Walters in the original series. She is first seen in the pilot episode "Woo-oo!", and makes several reappearances in the series.
- Johnny and Randy (both voiced by Keith Ferguson) – Twin rooster brothers and the hosts of a popular show-within-a-show, The Ottoman Empire (an apparent parody of the real-life "Property Brothers"), which sees them creating custom-made ottomans. The characters, and their show, make their first appearance in "The Great Dime Chase!", where Glomgold is their guest, and continue to make appearances throughout the series.
- Falcon Graves (voiced by Robin Atkin Downes) – A menacing industrial spy and professional criminal who tries to steal Mark Beaks' secret project in "The Infernal Internship of Mark Beaks!", unaware that he was hired by Beaks himself to raise his social media popularity. He later appears in "Louie's Eleven!", where he posed as a security guard working at Emma Glamour's party to steal her phone and sell it to an unknown buyer, which turns out to be Beaks again, much to his dismay. He and his allies were defeated and arrested.
- Amunet (voiced by Cree Summer) – The leader of the latest generation of Toth-Ra's followers, the living mummies, as seen in her debut episode, "The Living Mummies of Toth-Ra!" She later makes an appearance in "Moonvasion!", working alongside Faris Djinn to repel Moonlanders that had invaded Egypt.
- Charybdis (voiced by Fred Tatasciore) – A terrifying but ultimately friendly sea monster living in Selene's temple on Ithaquack. Based on the mythological sea monster of the same name, it appears in "The Spear of Selene!" and "Treasure of the Found Lamp!".
- Meta-fictional Darkwing Duck supervillains appear as Launchpad and other characters watch episodes of the Darkwing Duck show-within-a-show: scenes with jester/toy-themed villain Quackerjack (voiced by Michael Bell), electricity-powered villain Megavolt (voiced by Keith Ferguson), and water-based villain The Liquidator (voiced by Corey Burton in "Beware the B.U.D.D.Y. System!", Keith Ferguson in "Let's Get Dangerous!") appear in "Beware the B.U.D.D.Y. System!", while Launchpad and Beakley watch a scene featuring supernatural entity Paddywhack (voiced by Jim Cummings) in "Friendship Hates Magic!". Another version of Megavolt (also voiced by Ferguson) is featured as a character in McDuck Studios' attempt to reboot the franchise in "The Duck Knight Returns!", which also includes several non-speaking cameo appearances by the other characters; including the half-duck/half-plant mutant Bushroot. In "Let's Get Dangerous!", Taurus Bulba uses the Ramrod to bring alternate dimension versions of Quackerjack, Megavolt, Liquidator, and Bushroot into his dimension so they can help him destroy it. The villains form the Fearsome Four and fight Drake, Launchpad, and Gosalyn until they are sent back to their native dimension when the Ramrod is destroyed.
  The villains were all originally created by Tad Stones as supervillains on the original Darkwing Duck series; with Bell reprising his role.
- DT-87 (voiced by Yuri Lowenthal) – A security robot purchased by Scrooge to protect his fortune in "Day of the Only Child", in which it temporarily went on a rampage after Webby tore out some of its wires in an attempt to keep the boys together before Huey's able to reprogram it. It appears again in "GlomTales!" after Della had Gyro program it to guard Louie and stop him from scheming after she grounded him for endangering the family during the events of "Timephoon!".
- Mr. and Mrs. Drake (voiced by Yuri Lowenthal and Tara Platt, respectively) – Doofus' parents who are forced to be his servants. Terrified of their son, they bend to his every whim, no matter how strange, and appear by his side in "Day of the Only Child!" and "Treasure of the Found Lamp!". In "Happy Birthday, Doofus Drake!", while being forced to wait on their son for his birthday party, Louie gives them Mark Beaks' robot son, B.O.Y.D., as a new son. The android then transfers half of Doofus' inheritance to himself, finally allowing the parents to stand up to Doofus and ground him for his spoiled and insane behavior while accepting B.O.Y.D. as their new son.
- Gavin (voiced by Sam Riegel) – A Sasquatch conman who first appeared in "The Other Bin of Scrooge McDuck!" before making minor reappearances throughout the series.
- Peg Leg Meg (voiced by Kimberly Brooks) – A member of Don Karnage's Sky Pirates who serves as the first mate on the Iron Vulture. Following her introduction in "Sky Pirates...in the Sky!", she makes minor reappearances throughout the series.
- Ugly Mug (voiced by Keith Ferguson) – A member of Don Karnage's Sky Pirates who first appeared in "Sky Pirates...in the Sky!" before making minor reappearances throughout the series.
- Hard Tack Hattie (voiced by Kimberly Brooks) – A buff female member of Don Karnage's Sky Pirates who first appeared in "Sky Pirates...in the Sky!" She was later fused with an ant while trying to pick up the Stone of What Was in "The Lost Cargo of Kit Cloudkicker!".
- Gibbous and Zenith (voiced by Rob Paulsen and April Winchell, respectively) – A married couple of civilian Moonlanders who become smitten by Della's stories from Earth, fall for Lunaris' lies about how Della betrayed them, encounter Donald, prepare for war, and take part in Lunaris' invasion of Earth before learning that Lunaris tried to destroy them along with the Earth and free their captives. In the succeeding months, they quickly settle into life on Earth, with Gibbous becoming Glomgold's assistant.
- Percival P. Peppington (voiced by Keith Ferguson) – The creator of Pep. He appeared in two episodes, both trying to crash a party, and was kicked out in both. He always wears a purple suit and is inspired by Willy Wonka.
- Goofy (voiced by Bill Farmer) – A "special guest star" who appeared as Donald's sitcom friend and neighbor in the episode "Quack Pack!".
  Like Donald, Goofy is a signature Disney character, who originally debuted in the 1932 animated short Mickey's Revue while his DuckTales design is inspired by his Goof Troop incarnation.
- Chip 'n' Dale and the Rescue Rangers (all voiced by Jeff Bennett, April Winchell and Corey Burton) – A group of formerly ordinary chipmunks, mice, and a housefly that Black Heron tested her Intelli-Ray on, making them anthropomorphic and more intelligent. After breaking out from their confines, they helped Launchpad and Dewey escape as well and assisted them in their fight against Steelbeak.
  Like Donald and Goofy, Chip 'n' Dale are classic Disney characters, who are usually depicted as enemies of Donald's. Their prototypes debuted in the 1943 short Private Pluto before they made their official debut in the 1947 short Chip an' Dale. The Rescue Rangers (consisting of Chip, Dale, Monterey Jack, Gadget Hackwrench, and Zipper) debuted on the 1989 TV series Chip 'n Dale: Rescue Rangers. They were originally set to be introduced as a group of "underground resistance fighters that tagged their logo wherever they helped". However, the idea was scrapped after Disney executives denied the creators the rights to use the Rescue Rangers due to their then-upcoming live-action film. However, when development began on the season three episode "Double-O-Duck in You Only Crash Twice!", the creators came up with the idea of Gadget making a brief cameo, which they secretly implemented by referring her to as an "Intelligent Rodent" in the episode's script. The idea eventually evolved into the Rescue Rangers' role in the episode, which Disney executives eventually authorized.
- Gosalyn Waddlemeyer (voiced by Stephanie Beatriz) – A rebellious tomboy introduced in "Let's Get Dangerous!", when she asks Drake and Launchpad to help her find her grandfather, Dr. Thaddeus Waddlemeyer, who was pulled into another dimension while trying to warn his co-worker, Taurus Bulba, about a flaw in the Ramrod, a machine they built to pull items from other dimensions, and expose Bulba for taking over the project. After Bulba brought Darkwing Duck supervillains into their dimension to help him destroy it, Gosalyn, Drake, and Launchpad set out to stop them. When the Ramrod becomes more unstable, Gosalyn is forced to destroy it, sacrificing the chance to save her grandfather. Following this, Drake asks Gosalyn to become his crime-fighting partner while they find a way to bring her grandfather back. In "The Last Adventure!", she joins the Ducks in foiling F.O.W.L.'s plans to rid the world of adventuring.
  Gosalyn was originally created by Tad Stones for the original Darkwing Duck animated series. She was originally planned to be introduced as Huey's rival in the Junior Woodchucks "who kept all her merit badges shoved in a plastic shopping bag", but the idea was scrapped.
- Taurus Bulba (voiced by James Monroe Iglehart) – A scientist at McDuck Enterprises' research facility in St. Canard, Dr. Thaddeus Waddlemeyer's co-worker, and a member of F.O.W.L. introduced in "Let's Get Dangerous!", when he was tasked with figuring out how to use the Solego Circuit, which he fused into the Ramrod, a machine he and Thaddeus built to pull items from other dimensions. Thaddeus tried to warn Bulba about a flaw in the Ramrod, but was pulled into another dimension when it backfired. Following this, Bulba takes over the project, betrays Scrooge and F.O.W.L., and brings Darkwing Duck supervillains into his dimension to help him destroy it, but he runs afoul of Drake, Launchpad, and Thaddeus' granddaughter, Gosalyn. Bulba is defeated after Gosalyn destroys the Ramrod.
  Bulba was first introduced as a recurring antagonist in the Darkwing Duck animated series, where he was a powerful crime boss whose minions killed Thaddeus while attempting to gain information from him and served as Darkwing's first major enemy.
- Kit Cloudkicker and Molly Cunningham (voiced by Adam Pally and Eliza Coupe, respectively) – The "cloud-kicking" owner of the Higher for Hire air cargo company and owner of "Danger Woman's Death-Defying Sky Circus" respectively who grew up together and attended flight school with Della.The two were later seen in "The Last Adventure!" where they were captured by F.O.W.L. but later rescued by the ducks.
  Kit and Molly originally appeared as kids in the animated series TaleSpin.

== Other media characters ==
- Merlock (voiced by Christopher Lloyd) – A powerful warlock who uses a green talisman to shape-shift into various (non-anthropomorphic) animals. He is the main antagonist of DuckTales the Movie: Treasure of the Lost Lamp, in which he seeks to find the magic lamp, and gain unlimited wishes by combining it with his talisman. Once, he used its combined powers to gain immortality, the sinking of Atlantis (which was depicted as a famous resort city where he couldn't get a reservation), the eruption of Mount Vesuvius that destroyed Pompeii, and the creation of anchovy pizza (which was replaced by broccoli pizza in the Italian dub). He eventually falls to his death.
  Since the film, Merlock has made appearances in various Disney media, including the video games Legend of Illusion Starring Mickey Mouse and Donald Duck: Goin' Quackers (the latter in which he is voiced by Corey Burton).
- Drake Von Vladstone / Count Dracula Duck (voiced by Frank Welker) – The final villain of the video game Ducktales and its remake DuckTales: Remastered. He is a Transylvanian vampire duck who gets resurrected by Magica De Spell.

== List of guest characters ==
=== In the 1987 series ===
Character	Voice actor	Description	Appearance
Joaquin Slowly	Peter Cullen	The descendant of one of El Capitán's shipmates who rules over a superstitious tribe in the Andes.	"Treasure of the Golden Suns (Part 3): Three Ducks of the Condor"
Skittles	Patty Parris	A young penguin whom Webby befriends in Antarctica.	"Treasure of the Golden Suns (Part 4): Cold Duck"
Major Courage	Terry McGovern	The William Shatner-esque star of a Star Trek-like TV show.	"Where No Duck Has Gone Before"
Overlord Bulovan	Hamilton Camp	An evil alien overlord from the planet Kronk.	"Where No Duck Has Gone Before"
Armstrong	Peter Cullen	A robot designed by Gyro to perform household chores, who goes rogue and seeks to take over the world.	"Armstrong"
Djinni	Howard Morris	The gluttonous genie of a magic lamp who got to enjoy the luxuries of McDuck Manor. His voice is an impression of Ed Wynn.	"Master of the Djinni"
Schewebazade	Joan Gerber	A beautiful storyteller and spoof on Scheherazade, who is imprisoned in the harem of a wicked Sultan, but saves Scrooge and Glomgold and plots an escape.	"Master of the Djinni"
Emir of Somnambula	Roger C. Carmel	Schewebazade's betrothed. Voice actor Carmel, who also voiced the evil Sultan, died before the show aired.	"Master of the Djinni"
Ludwig von Strangeduck	Arte Johnson	A supposedly "mad" scientist believed to be dead. He has some resemblance to Ludwig von Drake, but is a distinct character.	"Hotel Strangeduck"
Featherika von Strangeduck	Joan Gerber	Dr. von Strangeduck's sister who masqueraded as the "Duchess of Swansylvania". Modeled on Eva Gabor.	"Hotel Strangeduck"
Sir Guy Standforth	Pat Fraley	A callous, stuck-up member of the Duckburg Explorers Club.	"Lost Crown of Genghis Khan"
Mad Dog McGurk	Peter Cullen	A tough but innocent prison inmate of Aquatraz who befriends the likewise falsely-convicted Scrooge in jail and find a mutual enemy in Glomgold. Both of them are pardoned by the governor upon proof of their innocence being revealed.	"Duckman of Aquatraz"
King Artie	Richard Erdman	The king of the medieval kingdom of Quackelot and a spoof of King Arthur of Camelot.	"Sir Gyro de Gearloose"
Moorloon	Barry Dennen	King Artie's German-accented magician and a spoof of Merlin.	"Sir Gyro de Gearloose"
Lesdred	Peter Cullen	King Artie's traitorous nephew and a spoof of Mordred.	"Sir Gyro de Gearloose"
Auric	Ken Mars	A Viking king who kidnaps Mrs. Beakley.	"Maid of the Myth"
Thor	William Callaway	The mightiest of Auric's Vikings.	"Maid of the Myth"
Griselda	Tress MacNeille	Auric's queen who is jealous of Mrs. Beakley.	"Maid of the Myth"
Swanwhite	Tress MacNeille	A shepherd girl who helps Launchpad train for a Viking chariot race. She has a large, dimwitted, affable boyfriend named Erik, who does not speak.	"Maid of the Myth"
Fritter O'Way	Aron Kincaid	A conniving fox who forces Scrooge to hand over his fortune due to an old unpaid debt. Based on comics character Chisel McSue.	"Down and Out in Duckburg"
Robin Lurch	Rob Paulsen	The host of Scrooge's favorite TV show Lifestyles of the Filthy Rich and a spoof of Robin Leach of Lifestyles of the Rich and Famous.	"Down and Out in Duckburg"
Filler Brushbill	Charlie Adler	Duckburg's super salesman capable of selling something to everyone he meets. He has some similarities to Gladstone Gander.	"Much Ado About Scrooge"
Ripcord McQuack	Robert Ridgely	Launchpad's estranged father and a daring pilot.	"Top Duck"
Birdie McQuack	Russi Taylor	Launchpad's mother and a daring pilot.	"Top Duck"
Loopy McQuack	B.J. Ward	Launchpad's sister and fellow star pilot.	"Top Duck"
Yardarm	Hal Smith	Assistant to Sharkey (Pete). He is based on Catfoot, Scuttle, Saltspray, and similar interchangeable henchmen of Pete in Carl Fallberg's Mickey Mouse comics from the 1950s onward.	"Pearl of Wisdom"
Colonel Beauregard DuBark	Alan Oppenheimer	The descendant of Confederate General Elijah DuBark, who overcame Launchpad's great-great-grandfather at the Battle of Duck Ridge.	"Launchpad's Civil War"
Rufus B. Pinfeathers	Richard Erdman	The mayor of Duck Ridge, presiding over a re-enactment of the Civil War Battle of Duck Ridge, where the Confederates triumphed because of a Union General's incompetence. His name may be a reference to Groucho Marx as Rufus T. Firefly in Duck Soup.	"Launchpad's Civil War"
King Homer	Michael Mish	The young and noble king of the ancient Greek island Ithaquack. He is named after Greek epic poet Homer.	"Home Sweet Homer"
Circe	Tress MacNeille	An evil witch who transports Scrooge and the nephews to ancient Ithaquack in a failed attempt to overthrow King Homer with magic. Like her classical analog, she specializes in transforming men into actual, non-anthromorphic pigs. Additionally, she is an anthromorphic pig herself.	"Home Sweet Homer"
Queen Ariel	Tress MacNeille	King Homer's wife who was held prisoner by Circe.	"Home Sweet Homer"
King Blowhard	Peter Cullen	An acquaintance of King Homer's family with remarkably strong lungs and an allergy to certain types of fruit. Based on the Greek god Aeolus.	"Home Sweet Homer"
Captain Slattery	Peter Renaday	A captain of one of Scrooge's ships who was lost in the Bermuda Triangle.	"Bermuda Triangle Tangle"
Captain Bounty	Allan Melvin	A hapless sea captain residing in the Bermuda Triangle. He starts out as an antagonist but later becomes a steadfast ally.	"Bermuda Triangle Tangle"
Commander of the Microducks	Tress MacNeille	The commander of a crew of alien Microducks, originally created by Carl Barks.	"Micro Ducks from Outer Space"
Dangerous Dan	Will Ryan	An antagonist to Scrooge and rival for Goldie's affections while he was working in the Klondike. His name may be a reference to "The Shooting of Dan McGrew" by Robert W. Service, a poem which also informed some Carl Barks comics.	"Back to the Klondike"
Mr. Merriweather	Hal Smith	A photographer from Louisville, Kenducky.	"Horse Scents"
M'Lady	Susan Blu	Mr. Merriweather's horse whom Webby helps to win the Kenducky Derby.	"Horse Scents"
Bull Weevil	Johnny Haymer	A powerful oat tycoon attempting to get his hands on M'Lady.	"Horse Scents"
Lucky	Patty Parris	A lemming who accidentally steals the combination to Scrooge's vault.	"Scrooge's Pet"
Barnacle Biff	Brian Cummings	The seaman who sells Lucky to the nephews as a present for Scrooge.	"Scrooge's Pet"
Dr. Horatio Bluebottle	Chuck McCann	The inventor of a top-secret navy submarine and a secret ally of Glomgold.	"Catch as Cash Can (Part 2): A Whale of a Bad Time"
Master Malek	Frank Welker	The leader of a race of humanoid fish folk.	"Catch as Cash Can (Part 3): Aqua Ducks"
Archibald Quackerbill	Jack Angel	A sailor believed to have been eaten by a sea monster, but in fact faked his death to cover up his piratical activities.	"Merit-Time Adventure"
Captain Mallard	Frank Welker	The captain of Quackerbill's ship, who makes an alliance of convenience with former rival Dogface Pete.	"Merit-Time Adventure"
Captain Tann	Brian Cummings	A posh coast guard captain investigating the rumors of a sea monster.	"Merit-Time Adventure"
Agnes the Harpie	Tress MacNeille	The leader of a group of harpies originally appearing in the Carl Barks comic book story "The Golden Fleecing".	"The Golden Fleecing"
Anastasia the Harpie	Joan Gerber	A harpy who falls in love with Launchpad.	"The Golden Fleecing"
Wildcat	Chuck McCann	The manager of Scrooge's Texan oil reserves which are suddenly dried up.	"Ducks of the West"
J.R. Mooing	Frank Welker	A rich Texas oil tycoon, whose name and voice resemble Larry Hagman's Dallas character J.R. Ewing.	"Ducks of the West"
Tex Dogie	Alan Oppenheimer	The host of the Lucky Duck Dude Ranch in Texas. He masquerades as a ghostly highwayman in order to scare people away from the illegal oil well he operates.	"Ducks of the West"
Duke Duggan	Peter Cullen	A devious shepherd and a manager at Scrooge's sheep station in Australia.	"Back Out in the Outback"
Sundowner	Rob Paulsen	A shepherd who works at Scrooge's Australian station.	"Back Out in the Outback"
Dr. Von Geezer	Howard Morris	A D.A.S.A. (short for "Duckburg Aeronautics and Space Administration") scientist who sends Launchpad and Doofus on a space exploration program.	"The Right Duck"
Ronnie	Frank Welker	A D.A.S.A. monkey who proves to be smarter than Launchpad. His name be a play on Ronald Reagan, the then-US President, who oversaw some important NASA programs, and once starred in a series of movies about Bonzo the Chimp.	"The Right Duck"
Ping the Pitiless	Ronnie Schell	The cruel emperor of Mars, whose name is a play on Ming the Merciless, facing off against Launchpad and Doofus.	"The Right Duck"
J. Gander Hoover	Peter Cullen	A spoof of J. Edgar Hoover and the head of the D.I.A. (short for "Duckburg Intelligence Agency"). In Darkwing Duck, his character was reworked into J. Gander Hooter, director of S.H.U.S.H.	"Double-O-Duck"
Dr. Nogood	René Auberjonois	A high-ranking F.O.W.L. agent plotting to destroy all the money in the world. He combines elements of James Bond villains Ernst Stavro Blofeld, Dr. Julius No, and Auric Goldfinger. His mute assistant Odd Duck is based on Oddjob. In a rare DuckTales example, Dr. Nogood apparently dies on-screen. While he does reappear in some comics, these might not take place in strict continuity with the cartoon.	"Double-O-Duck"
Bruno von Beak	Terry McGovern	A F.O.W.L. agent and Launchpad's doppelgänger.	"Double-O-Duck"
Feathers Galore	Tress MacNeille	A F.O.W.L. agent and spoof of Pussy Galore who encounters Launchpad while he is undercover as Bruno von Beak whom she loves.	"Double-O-Duck"
Far darrig	Frank Welker	A trickster leprechaun who turns up in the Money Bin and befriends Webby.	"Luck o' the Ducks"
King Brian	Billy Barty	The wealthy king of Far darrig's Irish homeland. Possibly based on the same-named character from Darby O'Gill and the Little People.	"Luck o' the Ducks"
Brigadier Broccoli	George DiCenzo	The broccoli-themed leader of the Vegedonians, an alien race abducting Duckworth and the nephews.	"Duckworth's Revolt"
Lieutenant Garlic	Michael Bell	A high-ranking garlic-themed Vegedonian.	"Duckworth's Revolt"
Sergeant Squash	Steve Susskind	A high-ranking squash-themed Vegedonian. When charging into battle, he chants "Squish squash! Squish squash!"	"Duckworth's Revolt"
Prince Greydrake, aka the Jungle Phantom	Frank Welker	A prince for whom Mrs. Beakley was a nanny until he disappeared in a jungle. He encounters the Ducks and is later crowned king of an unnamed country. He is a spoof of Lord Greystoke (Tarzan), with elements of Lee Falk's Phantom of Bangalla.	"Jungle Duck"
Queen Grunta	Linda Gary	The leader of a tribe of female warriors in a Pellucidar-like underground world, whom Scrooge and Launchpad met during their first flight together, as told in flashbacks.	"Launchpad's First Crash"
Count Roy	Maurice LaMarche	An old friend of Scrooge and the ruler of the kingdom of Montedumas. His title is a reference to Alexandre Dumas and The Count of Monte Cristo, but the story is based on Dumas' Musketeer cycle, set in a different era.	"Duck in the Iron Mask"
Count Ray	Arte Johnson	Count Roy's twin brother who incarcerated Ray and took his identity, based on the French legend of the Man in the Iron Mask.	"Duck in the Iron Mask"
Burt Quackarach	Terry McGovern	A spoof of Burt Bacharach hired to play the piano on the maiden voyage of the Hindentanic.	"The Uncrashable Hindentanic"
Irwin Mallard	Terry McGovern	A passenger of the Hindentanic, a famous disaster film director, and a spoof of Irwin Allen.	"The Uncrashable Hindentanic"
Quacks	Chuck McCann	Gloria Swansong's assistant, based on Max from Sunset Boulevard.	"The Uncrashable Hindentanic"
Carl Sagander	Frank Welker	A famed Duckburg scientist and spoof of Carl Sagan who travels on the Hindentanic.	"The Uncrashable Hindentanic"
Charles Upstart III	Terry McGovern	The president of the Association of Status Seekers who competes with Scrooge to find the Mask of Kuthu-lulu. Based on comics character Porkman de Lardo.	"The Status Seekers"
Dr. Kooncen Wiemers	Terry McGovern	A member of the Association of Status Seekers, named after show writers Ken Koonce and David Weimers.	"The Status Seekers"
Bully Beagle	Pat Musick	An older kid bullying Doofus. Implicitly a relative of the Beagle Boys	"Nothing to Fear"
Jack the Tripper	Peter Cullen	A notorious London-based thief named for Jack the Ripper but who only commits "family friendly" robberies rather than murders. Shedlock Jones deduces that Jack is in fact Professor Moody Doody, a parody of Professor Moriarty.	"Dr. Jekyll and Mr. McDuck"
Shedlock Jones	Clive Revill	A spoof of Sherlock Holmes who helps the nephews capture Jack the Tripper.	"Dr. Jekyll and Mr. McDuck"
Catfish McDuck	Peter Renaday	Scrooge's uncle, serving as a steamboat captain on the Mississippi at the time young Scrooge arrived in the United States. His comic book counterpart is Pothole McDuck.	"Once Upon a Dime"
Old Man Ribbit	William Callaway	A dishonest steamboat captain and Uncle Catfish's rival. Unusually for this series, he is an anthropomorphic frog. His analog in the comics is Porker Hogg, a more conventional "pigface."	"Once Upon a Dime"
Cinnamon Teal	Haunani Minn	A super-spy who hypnotizes Donald into betraying the Navy, but eventually regrets her ways and helps the Ducks. She also appears in the BOOM! Studios DuckTales and Darkwing Duck comics.	"Spies in Their Eyes"
Victor Luzer	Bernie Kopell	A pig spy working with Cinnamon Teal. Voice actor Kopell parodies his Get Smart character Agent Siegfried.	"Spies in Their Eyes"
Ensign Plover	Mark Taylor	A naval officer and adjutant to Admiral Grimitz, to whom he is a flattering "teacher's pet." His true colors are petty and vindictive, as he enjoys tormenting Donald by assigning extra hours of KP. He is later revealed to be "Agent X," a traitor who helps the Phantom Blot steal a cloaking device. Some character guides incorrectly list him as "Ensign Plummer."	"All Ducks on Deck"
Mr. Wolf	Dick Gautier	A werewolf attending the Duckburg monster convention.	"Ducky Horror Picture Show"
Count Drakeula	Alan Oppenheimer	A vampire attending the Duckburg monster convention. He is a spoof of Count Dracula.	"Ducky Horror Picture Show"
Millionara Vanderbucks	Tress MacNeille	A gold digger attempting to lure Scrooge into marriage.	"'Till Nephews Do Us Part"
Mung Ho	Keone Young	The tyrant ruler of the ancient city of Tupei who the Ducks encounter while traveling through time.	"Time Is Money (Part 2): The Duck Who Would Be King"
Sen-Sen	Haunani Minn	A peasant who is saved from Mung Ho and eventually becomes his successor. She shares a mutual attraction with Launchpad.	"Time Is Money (Part 2): The Duck Who Would Be King"
Julie Blurf	Russi Taylor	A neighboring girl who becomes Bubba's girlfriend despite their families' ongoing feud.	"Bubbeo and Juliet"
Cookie Blurf	Mary Jo Catlett	Julie's mother and a recent lottery winner who gets off on the wrong foot with Scrooge.	"Bubbeo and Juliet"
Robotica	Susan Blu	Gyro's robotic maid who falls in love with Gizmoduck and attempts to kill Gandra Dee.	"Metal Attraction"
Aphroducky	Linda Gary	The goddess of love and spoof of Aphrodite who gets engaged to Scrooge after they are both hit by Cupid's arrows.	"A DuckTales Valentine"
Vulcan	Ken Mars	The jealous husband of Aphroducky.	"A DuckTales Valentine"
Goldfeather	Susan Blu	A French spy attempting to steal Scrooge's gold. She is a spoof of Auric Goldfinger.	"The Duck Who Knew Too Much"
Nurse Hatchet	Kathleen Freeman	A nurse who examines Scrooge. She is named after Nurse Ratched of One Flew Over the Cuckoo's Nest.	"Scrooge's Last Adventure"

=== In the 2017 series ===
Character	Voice actor	Description	Appearance
Captain Peghook	Keith Ferguson	An undead ghost pirate rumored to have once terrorized and plundered the river Styx.	"Woo-oo!"
Toad Liu Hai	BD Wong	A casino owner and spirit of chance and fortune who holds Gladstone Gander hostage to harvest his good luck. He is based on Taoist deity Liu Haichan.	"The House of the Lucky Gander!"
Toth-Ra	Bassem Youssef	An ancient, mummified pharaoh whom the ducks awaken while exploring his pyramid.	"The Living Mummies of Toth-Ra!"
Sabaf	Bassem Youssef	The latest in a long line of Toth-Ra's guards who impersonated the pharaoh to benefit from his followers.	"The Living Mummies of Toth-Ra"
George Mallardy	Brian Drummond	A spoof of George Mallory and an explorer who Scrooge hired to help him climb Mt. Neverrest 70 years ago, until Mallardy betrayed him.	"The Impossible Summit of Mt. Neverrest!"
Salesman	Carlos Alazraqui	A con artist who runs Mt. Neverrest-themed scams.	"The Impossible Summit of Mt. Neverrest!"
Briar and Bramble	Tara Strong and Andrea Libman	Two kelpies who attempt to lure the ducks into the sea to drown them. Their design is inspired by the ponies from My Little Pony: Friendship Is Magic, in which their voice actresses star.	"The Missing Links of Moorshire!"
Oceanika	Jennifer Hale	A mermaid and a former girlfriend of Launchpad's.	"The Depths of Cousin Fethry!"
Fisher and Mann	John DiMaggio and Grey Griffin	A couple of honest "fisherpersons" who found and became partners with the amnesiac Glomgold.	"The Ballad of Duke Baloney!"
Past	Jack McBrayer	The Ghost of Christmas Past is a bug and acquaintance of Scrooge.	"Last Christmas!"
Present	Bill Fagerbakke	The Ghost of Christmas Present is a pig and acquaintance of Scrooge.	"Last Christmas!"
Future	N/A	The Ghost of Christmas Future looks like The Grim Reaper and is acquaintance of Scrooge.	"Last Christmas!"
Rhutt Betlah	David Kaye	A businessman who approached Scrooge with "square rocks". The character, whose name and DuckTales appearance are based on Rhett Butler, originates in Barks' "Lost in the Andes!".	"Last Christmas!"
Marshall Cabrera	Lin-Manuel Miranda	An Old West ancestor of Fenton's introduced to Scrooge while serving as Sheriff of Gumption.	"The Outlaw Scrooge McDuck!"
Corvus, Anya, and Klara Von Drake	Corey Burton and Kari Wahlgren	Ludwig Von Drake's children and the present-day owners of his estate who grew up to be scientists like their father.	"Raiders of the Doomsday Vault!"
Dr. Atmoz Fear	Tom Kenny	A supervillain with weather-manipulation abilities whom Gizmoduck captured. The character's design was inspired by Phineas and Ferb character Dr. Heinz Doofenshmirtz.	"The Dangerous Chemistry of Gandra Dee!"
Alistair Boorswan	Edgar Wright	A British film director who is set to direct a Darkwing Duck reboot film for McDuck Studios.	"The Duck Knight Returns!"
Tad the Security Guard	Tad Stones	A McDuck Studios employee who tries to keep Starling away from Boorswan's film. The character is named after and voiced by the original Darkwing Duck series creator Tad Stones.	"The Duck Knight Returns!"
Jones	James Adomian	Donald's anger management counselor, whom Dewey and Webby investigate following Donald's disappearance. The character was created by Barks in 1943, originally serving as Donald's equally foul-tempered neighbor.	"What Ever Happened to Donald Duck?!"
Phooey Duck	N/A	An imaginary fourth brother made up by Dewey dressed in a yellow t-shirt and beanie. The character was inspired by artist errors that saw four triplets drawn in instead of three and was later named by Disney comic editor Bob Foster.	"A Nightmare on Killmotor Hill!" (mentioned in "What Ever Happened to Donald Duck?!")
Cornelius Coot	N/A	The founder of Duckburg and an ancestor of the Duck family who left behind a Golden Armory underneath Fort Duckburg and fought off a battalion of Beagles. Barks created the character in 1952, with Rosa detailing his history in later stories.	"The Golden Armory of Cornelius Coot!"
Benjamin Frankloon	Dee Bradley Baker	A spoof of Benjamin Franklin who was accidentally brought to the present when Louie inadvertently turned a hurricane into a "timephoon", though he was eventually returned to his own time.	"Timephoon!"
The Bombie	Fred Tatasciore	A relentless, zombie-like monster connected to a curse that forces it to destroy the richest person in the world. The character was created by Barks for the 1949 comic story "Voodoo Hoodoo".	"The Richest Duck in the World!"
J.W. Guidebook	Stephen Root	An imaginary, anthropomorphized version of Huey's Junior Woodchuck guidebook that he conjured while competing against Violet.	"Challenge of the Senior Junior Woodchucks!"
Max Goof	N/A	Goofy's son who appears in his wallet photos when he gives Donald familial advice. Max made his first appearance in the 1992 TV series, Goof Troop.	"Quack Pack!"
P.J. Pete	N/A	Pete's son and Max's best friend who also appears in Goofy's family photos. P.J. made his first appearance in the 1942 short, "Bellboy Donald" as "Pete Junior", while his design is based on his Goof Troop incarnation.	"Quack Pack!"
Roxanne	N/A	Max's girlfriend who also appears in Goofy's wallet photos. Roxanne made her first appearance in the 1995 film, A Goofy Movie.	"Quack Pack!"
Alethiea	Hynden Walch	A mermaid and denizen of Mervana.	"The Lost Harp of Mervana!"
Vero	Greg Cipes	A merman and denizen of Mervana.	"The Lost Harp of Mervana!"
Mystical Harp	Retta	A sentient Mervanan artifact compelled to only speak and confirm the truth. She is based on the Harp of Troy from the original DuckTales episode "Raiders of the Lost Harp".	"The Lost Harp of Mervana!"
King Honestus	Jeff Bennett	The ruler of Mervana who tried to flee from his duties, only to cause his kingdom to sink into the ocean while he turned into a sea monster.	"The Lost Harp of Mervana!"
Emma Glamour	Bebe Neuwirth	A famous trendsetter in Duckburg, Mark Beaks' mother, and Daisy's employer.	"Louie's Eleven!"
Doctor Akita	Cary-Hiroyuki Tagawa	A villainous akita (dog breed) roboticist and Gyro's former mentor who co-created B.O.Y.D. with him.	"Astro B.O.Y.D.!"
Inspector Tezuka	Tamlyn Tomita	A tough police officer from Tokyolk who dislikes robots. She is named after Osamu Tezuka, one of Barks' best friends.	"Astro B.O.Y.D.!"
Jörmungandr	Kristofer Hivju	The sea serpent from Norse mythology who battles Scrooge every decade in a wrestling tournament for the fate of the Earth.	"The Rumble for Ragnarok!"
Strongbeard	John DiMaggio	A Norse warrior with an enchanted beard and participant in Jörmungandr's wrestling tournament.	"The Rumble for Ragnarok!
Hecka	Grey Griffin	A Norse warrior and participant in Jörmungandr's wrestling tournament. She is inspired by the Norse goddess, Hel, while her name is derived from the Marvel Comics character, Hela.	"The Rumble for Ragnarok!"
Fenrir	N/A	Hecka's pet wolf and participant in Jörmungandr's wrestling tournament.	"The Rumble for Ragnarok!
Wereduck	Doug Jones	One of the monsters of Duckburg, first seen disguised as Pennywise the Dancing Clown.	"The Trickening!"
Frankenstein	Clancy Brown	One of the monsters of Duckburg, first seen disguised as a limbless zombie.	"The Trickening!"
Witch Hazel	Selma Blair	A witch and one of the monsters of Duckburg, first seen disguised as Sadako Yamamura. She shares her name with a character of the same name, first introduced in the short film Trick or Treat.	"The Trickening!"
Nosferatu	James Marsters	A vampire and one of the monsters of Duckburg, first seen disguised as Billy the Puppet. For reasons unknown, he is miscredited as "Dracula".	"The Trickening!"
Ponce de León	Néstor Carbonell	A lion and a 16th-century explorer and conquistador who discovered the Fountain of the Foreverglades and turned its waters into a resort pool so he could drain the youth from those who swam in it and stay young forever.	"The Forbidden Fountain of the Foreverglades!"
W.A.N.D.A.	Jameela Jamil	Drake's artificially intelligent supercomputer based in his lair. She shares some traits with the D-2000 supercomputer from the Darkwing Duck episode "Star Crossed Circuits".	"Let's Get Dangerous!"
Dr. Thaddeus Waddlemeyer	N/A	Gosalyn's grandfather and Taurus Bulba's co-worker who mysteriously went missing/was pulled into another dimension while trying to warn Bulba about a flaw in the Ramrod, a machine they built to pull items from other dimensions. He is based on Professor Waddlemayer from the original Darkwing Duck series.	"Let's Get Dangerous!"
Bonkers D. Bobcat	N/A	A St. Canard police officer who is terrorized by invading supervillains. The character originated in the 1993 Disney Afternoon animated series Bonkers.	"Let's Get Dangerous!"
Christoph	Flula Borg	A spice baron from Istanbird whom Louie, Violet, and Rockerduck encounter while searching for a piece of the Split Sword of Swanstantine.	"The Split Sword of Swanstantine!"
Hades	Chris Diamantopoulos	Zeus's brother and ruler of the Underworld. He is based on the Greek deity of the same name.	"New Gods on the Block!"
Matilda McDuck	Michelle Gomez	Scrooge's younger sister and a member of Clan McDuck. She was first mentioned in a sketch Barks made for the McDuck family tree before Rosa featured her in The Life and Times of Scrooge McDuck.	"The Fight for Castle McDuck!"
Santa Claus	Hugh Bonneville	A legendary figure connected to Christmas who invented the tradition of giving presents on the holiday with Scrooge before they parted ways on bad terms.	"How Santa Stole Christmas!"
Baloo von Bruinwald XIII	N/A	Kit's mentor and the original owner of the "Higher for Hire" air cargo company who appears in a commercial for the Higher for Hire. Loosely inspired by the character of the same name created for Rudyard Kipling's The Jungle Book, Baloo first appeared in Disney's 1967 animated film adaptation while his design is based on his TaleSpin incarnation.	"The Lost Cargo of Kit Cloudkicker!"
Rhinokey and Butterbear	N/A	Chimeric inhabitants of an island created by the Stone of What Was. They are based on the characters of the same name from The Wuzzles.	"The Lost Cargo of Kit Cloudkicker!"
Bailiff	Henry Winkler	A bailiff for the karmic court who speaks on behalf of Lady Justice.	"The Life and Crimes of Scrooge McDuck!"
May and June	Riki Lindhome and Noël Wells	Clones of Webby who were created by F.O.W.L. to steal the Missing Mysteries until they have a change of heart, help the family defeat Bradford, and are adopted by Donald. They are inspired by Daisy Duck's nieces of the same name, created by Barks for the 1953 comic "Flip Decision".	"The Last Adventure!"
