= Last Sled to Dawson =

Comic by Don Rosa

- Story code: AR 113
- Story: Don Rosa
- Ink: Don Rosa
- Hero: Scrooge McDuck
- Pages: 28
- Layout: 4 rows per page
- Appearances: Scrooge McDuck; Goldie O'Gilt; Soapy Slick; Casey Coot
- First publication: June 1988

"Last Sled to Dawson" is a 1988 Scrooge McDuck comic by Don Rosa. It is Rosa's third full-length Uncle Scrooge story after The Son of the Sun and Cash Flow, both published the previous year. Last Sled is the first story in which Rosa delves into Scrooge's past life, on his journey to becoming the richest man in the world, and so acts as a spiritual sequel to Carl Barks's classic Scrooge story "Back to the Klondike", describing his experiences as a gold prospector during the Klondike Gold Rush.

Rosa would eventually create The Life and Times of Scrooge McDuck, a twelve-part serial chronicling several episodes in this journey, beginning with Scrooge's childhood in Scotland, and including the episode "The King of the Klondike", and the later companion stories "The Prisoner of White Agony Creek" and "The Hearts of the Yukon", also taking place in Yukon.

The story was first published in Uncle Scrooge Adventures #5 by Gladstone Publishing in June 1988.

== Plot ==
In the midst of a typically hectic business day, Scrooge McDuck notices a telegram from his bank in Whitehorse, which takes him back to December 1899:

The young Scrooge is stunned to be told that his latest deposit of gold ore into the bank has increased his holdings to $1 million. Believing it is more money than he will ever need, Scrooge decides to close down his claim in White Agony Creek, but doesn't know what to do with his life next. Outside the bank, he converses with another prospector, Casey Coot, who has also worked out his claim but can't afford passage home. Scrooge offers to buy his family's land back in the (fictional) American state of Calisota, believing he will settle down.

After loading his most prized possessions onto his dog sled, Scrooge begins an overland journey to Dawson City. Struck by the beauty of the landscape, he recites the final stanza of Robert W. Service's "The Spell of the Yukon", but realizes that he has lost his trail and wandered onto Mooseneck Glacier. A fissure opens, trapping his sled, and forcing him to cut his dogs loose. Unable to retrieve the sled, he jams his rifle into the fissure, hoping to come back for it later. Pursued by a pack of timber wolves, he falls off a cliff and crashes through the roof of Soapy Slick's gambling barge, on its return trip to Whitehorse. Disheartened by the loss of his sled, he decides that his luck soured as soon as he decided to retire from working and settle down, and resolves to keep working and accumulating even greater wealth.

He snaps back to the present with the arrival of Donald and his nephews, who open the telegram and learn that the ice covering Mooseneck Glacier has finally thawed enough to expose the marker of his sled. Elated, Scrooge says they are going "back to the Kliondike... again!"

After they arrive in Dawson City, Scrooge is surprised to see the infamous Blackjack Ballroom has been converted into a tourist hotel, and even more surprised to recognize the owner as his old flame, "Glittering" Goldie - who bought it with the money she won off Scrooge at their last meeting.

When Scrooge tries to charter a riverboat to Mooseneck Glacier, he alerts the owner, Soapy Slick, who has been waiting decades to claim whatever it was Scrooge lost - believing it to be the deed to the land in Calisota where Scrooge's Money Bin now stands. He throws Scrooge off the wharf and casts off for Mooseneck Glacier alone. Goldie offers them the use of a hot air balloon owned by the hotel to shortcut the journey over the mountains.

Reaching the glacier moments before Soapy, Scrooge hammers in a stake to mark the sled as legal salvage, but the glacier splits and an iceberg carries the ducks down the river, with Soapy in pursuit. Believing the sled will be legally his if the iceberg beaches on his wharf, Soapy orders his captain to ram it into dock, wrecking both his boat and the iceberg.

Scrooge's sled, freed of the ice, slides off the wharf and down Dawson's main street. Soapy runs after it on foot, but the sled hits a statue of Scrooge and it tips over, knocking Soapy unconscious with the stone replica of the Goose Egg Nugget in the statue's hands. Scrooge rushes to the sled as Donald wonders aloud what could be on the sled that's so valuable. In joy, Scrooge unpacks the sled, revealing his old prospector's kit: a coonskin cap and deerskin coat ("no silk topper and golden-fleece mackintosh could ever be as noble an outfit!"), his coffee pot and skillet ("no fancy meal has tasted half as fine as the beans I cooked on my own campfire under the Klondike stars!") and his old pickaxe, shovel and gold pan ("these were my tools before stock options and crop futures and compounded interest!") Regaining consciousness, Soapy is outraged to see there's nothing on the sled but "a buncha' junk!"

Huey, Dewey and Louie find one more item fallen off the sled: a box of chocolates with a card addressed to Goldie. That was the real purpose of his last trip to Dawson, and the nephews wonder aloud what might have happened if Scrooge had arrived as planned. With tears in her eyes, Goldie says Scrooge is a rich man for reasons that have nothing to do with money: rich in finding work that he enjoys, rich in the loyalty of his family and friends, and most of all, rich in memories.

== Production ==
The story uses "facts" from two stories by Carl Barks, Back to the Klondike and North of the Yukon. Otherwise most of the story uses real historic facts about the Klondike Gold Rush.

== Anachronisms ==
- Part of the story takes place in 1899, but Robert W. Service's poem "The Spell of the Yukon" was not published until 1907, in Songs of a Sourdough, alternately titled The Spell of the Yukon and Other Verses.

== Music ==
"The Last Sled" is the title of a song on Music Inspired by the Life and Times of Scrooge, composed by Tuomas Holopainen, in which Scrooge (voiced by Alan Reid) recites the same passage from "The Spell of the Yukon" that appears in the comic:

There's gold, and it's haunting and haunting;
It's luring me on as of old;
Yet it isn't the gold that I'm wanting so much as just finding the gold.
It's the great, big, broad land 'way up yonder,
It's the forests where silence has lease;
It's the beauty that thrills me with wonder,
It's the stillness that fills me with peace.
