= The Life and Times of Scrooge McDuck =

1992–1994 Disney comics series

- Cover of the collected edition published by Gemstone Publishing in 2005
- Publisher: First: Egmont Publishing - First US: Gladstone Publishing
- Publication date: First: 1992–1994 (Egmont) - First US: 1994–1996 (Gladstone Publishing)
- Genre: Adventure; Funny animals
Title(s)
First: Anders And & Co. (Egmont)
#33 B-1992
#45-1992
#2-1993
#11-1993
#18-1993
#24-1993
#29-1993
#30-1993
#31-1993
#45-1993
#10-1994
#15-1994
#16-1994
#17-1994
#22-1994
First US: Uncle Scrooge (Gladstone Publishing)
#285–296
- Main character: Scrooge McDuck

Creative team
- Writer: Don Rosa
- Artist: Don Rosa
- Letterer: Todd Klein (US edition)

The Life and Times of Scrooge McDuck (often stylized as The Life and Times of $CROOGE MꟲDUCK; sometimes abbreviated as Life of $crooge or Lo$) is a 12-part comic book storyline written and drawn by Don Rosa, lettered by Todd Klein (American editions), first published by the Danish publisher Egmont in the magazine Anders And & Co. from 1992 to 1994 and later in English in Uncle Scrooge #285 through #296 (1994–96). It follows the life of Scrooge McDuck from 1877 to 1947, the year of his real-life debut, working in almost every event about his past referenced in stories by Carl Barks. Rosa also drew the original cover of each chapter, and every chapter is laid out with four rows of panels per page. He later wrote several companion stories that fit between the original chapters.

Rosa earned the Will Eisner Award for Best Serialized Story in 1995 for this story. The trade paperback collection was also a top vote-getter for the Comics Buyer's Guide Fan Award for Favorite Reprint Graphic Novel/Album for 1997. After being out of print for several years with high demand, the book was reprinted under the BOOM! Studios label in two deluxe hardcover volumes, and again under Fantagraphics Books. The Finnish composer Tuomas Holopainen released a concept album based on the book, titled Music Inspired by the Life and Times of Scrooge, the cover of which was illustrated by Don Rosa.

A few chapters of the story exist under more than one title: "The King of the Klondike" (originally "The Phoenix of White Agony Creek" and then "The Argonaut of White Agony Creek"), "The Raider of the Copper Hill" (also known as "The King of the Copper Hill"), "The Empire-Builder from Calisota" ("The Richest Duck in the World"), and "The Richest Duck in the World" ("The Recluse of McDuck Manor").

== Connections to Carl Barks's stories ==
Rosa built the series by collecting the scattered references to Scrooge's past in the stories of Carl Barks, and several chapters contain deliberate nods to Barks's originals. "The Terror of the Transvaal" shows the young Flintheart Glomgold, who was introduced in Barks's 1956 story "The Second-Richest Duck". Rosa has said that he wrote the chapter carefully to fit that earlier story: Scrooge first learns Glomgold's name in "The Second-Richest Duck", but nothing in that story indicates that Glomgold did not already know Scrooge.

In the last panels of the chapter, Scrooge leaves South Africa after realizing that only conglomerates can finance the large mining operations needed to profit from the region's mineral wealth, and one of the mines he sees developing is the Kaffir de Gaffir mine, the prize contested by Scrooge and Glomgold in Barks's 1966 story "So Far and No Safari".

Likewise, "The Billionaire of Dismal Downs" contains the first actual appearance of Scottie McTerrier, a character invented by Barks. Barks had used him in "The Old Castle's Secret", but the ending of that story revealed that the character was really a criminal impersonating Scottie, who had died months before the story is set.

The Klondike stories follow the same approach. "The King of the Klondike" uses "facts" from two Barks stories, "Back to the Klondike" and "North of the Yukon", while most of the rest of the story draws on the real history of the Klondike Gold Rush. The companion story "The Prisoner of White Agony Creek" later returns to "Back to the Klondike" to show what happened during the month that Goldie O'Gilt spent working Scrooge's claim.

=== Scrooge McDuck timeline according to Rosa ===
- 1867: Scrooge was born in Glasgow, Scotland to Fergus McDuck and Downy O'Drake. He would have two younger sisters, namely Matilda McDuck (born in 1871) and Hortense McDuck (born in 1876).
- 1877: Scrooge, age 10, goes into business with a shoeshine kit that Fergus built for him, but his first customer fools him and pays him with an American dime (which was actually a plan of his father's). He keeps the dime he cannot spend as his symbol of success.
- 1880: Scrooge, age 13, emigrates to the United States. He first meets his uncle, Mississippi riverboater Angus "Pothole" McDuck, and the Beagle Boys, a family of outlaws that remain his enemies for the rest of his life.
- 1882: His uncle retires and leaves his riverboat, named Dilly Dollar, to Scrooge, now 15 years old. The Beagle Boys destroy the riverboat in an act of revenge. Scrooge decides to try his luck in the American West and later in the year gets hired as a cowboy by cattle baron Murdo MacKenzie (an actual historical figure, one of the many that Scrooge met).
- 1883: Scrooge, age 16, becomes a miner searching for silver and copper.
- 1885: Scrooge's father calls his son back to Scotland on an important family matter. Just a week before he leaves he meets and befriends the millionaire Howard Rockerduck, who had become rich in the California gold rush of 1849. He also meets Howard's seven-year-old spoiled son John D. Rockerduck, who will grow up to become one of Scrooge's main rivals.
- 1886–1889: Scrooge, age 19–22, searches for gold in South Africa (during the Witwatersrand Gold Rush). During his first year there he saves the life of a duck about his age named Flintheart Glomgold, though Scrooge learns his name more than half a century later. A little later they become bitter enemies, and remain as such for the rest of their lives. Glomgold later became the second richest duck in the world.
- 1889–1893: Scrooge, age 22–26, returns to the United States to search for gold, most notably near Pizen Bluff, Arizona. He meets many famous historical figures but his search fails.
- 1893–1896: Scrooge, age 26–29, goes to Coolgardie, Western Australia to search for gold but his search again fails.
- 1896–1899: Scrooge, age 29–32, searches for gold in the Klondike. During his years there he meets the saloon owner, singer and occasional thief "Glittering" Goldie O'Gilt. He carries a love/hate relationship with her for the rest of his life. His search for gold succeeds.
- 1897: Scrooge's mother Downy O'Drake dies, aged 57, in Dismal Downs. Scrooge is now 30.
- 1899–1902: Scrooge, at 32, becomes a millionaire and buys a bank in Whitehorse, Yukon. He starts building a small financial empire; by 1902, at 35, he has become a billionaire.
- 1902: Scrooge, age 35, returns to Scotland intending to make Castle McDuck at Dismal Downs the heart of his empire, but he soon finds local culture too stagnant and decides to return to America. His sisters Matilda McDuck and Hortense McDuck go to America with him. Also in 1902, Scrooge's father Fergus McDuck dies, aged 67, in Dismal Downs. Scrooge, Matilda and Hortense are the last of the McDuck clan. Scrooge settles in the small village of Duckburg, Calisota, United States, which he chose as his home base.
- 1909–1930: While his sisters remain in Duckburg and run his empire, Scrooge, age 42–63, travels the world expanding his empire in every continent.
- 1930: Scrooge, at 63, becomes the richest duck in the world, but a fight with his family leaves him with no contact with them for the next seventeen years. Note that during this year he met his ten-year-old nephew Donald Duck and his nephew's twin sister Della Duck for the first time. (It was possibly the only time Scrooge met his niece Della, ignoring the girl completely.)
- 1942: Scrooge, age 75, feels depressed and tired and decides to retire.
- 1947: Scrooge, age 80, meets his nephew Donald Duck, now age 27, as well as his grandnephews, Della's children, Huey, Dewey, and Louie Duck, who are under Donald's care. He decides to become active again and soon a circle of activities whirl around him as he attracts the attention of relatives, old and new enemies and friends.
- 1955: Scrooge, age 88, is reunited and reconciled with his sister Matilda, thanks to Donald (in the story "A Letter from Home").
- 1967: According to Don Rosa's unofficial timeline, Scrooge McDuck died at the age of 100 years after a life of adventure.

== Themes ==
=== Historical people and events ===
Real people and events appear throughout the series, as listed above. The most thoroughly researched example is the companion story "The Sharpie of the Culebra Cut", which is one of Rosa's most historically accurate stories. Its cast includes Theodore and Edith Roosevelt, Chief Parita of the Guyami, Captain George R. Shanton (formerly of the Rough Riders and by then of the Canal Zone Police), and the engineer John Frank Stevens.

The Panamanian general Esteban Huertas appears simply as "General Esteban", because Rosa needed to present him as a villain rather than a hero. Other historical personages are mentioned, including Manuel Amador Guerrero, the first President of Panama, the French government agent Philippe Bunau-Varilla, and the boxer "Gentleman Jim" Corbett, who Roosevelt claims tutored him in fisticuffs.

Several notable historical figures appear in the series:

- John Jacob Astor IV
- P. T. Barnum
- Roy Bean
- Buffalo Bill
- Butch Cassidy and the Sundance Kid
- The Dalton Gang
- Marcus Daly
- Wyatt Earp
- Geronimo
- Hamengkubuwono VII of Yogyakarta and Pakubuwono IX of Surakarta
- Esteban Huertas
- Frank and Jesse James
- Jack London
- Macbeth, King of Scotland
- Murdo MacKenzie
- Bat Masterson
- William Henry Moody
- Nicholas II, Emperor of Russia
- Annie Oakley
- Robert Peary
- Edith Roosevelt
- Theodore Roosevelt
- Captain George R. Shanton, Canal Zone Police
- John Frank Stevens
- Royal Canadian Mounted Police Colonel Sam Steele

Other notable historical figures mentioned include:

- Manuel Amador Guerrero
- Philippe Bunau-Varilla
- "Gentleman Jim" Corbett
- Sitting Bull
- John Philip Sousa
- Wild Bill Hickok

=== Historical details and inaccuracies ===
The teddy bear in "The Sharpie of the Culebra Cut" was indeed named for Roosevelt, and the first of its kind was sent to him in response to a 1902 political cartoon lampooning his refusal to shoot an American black bear that had already been captured and tied up before he arrived. Edith Roosevelt mentions "a candy store owner in Brooklyn" (Morris Michtom), who created a stuffed animal and sold it under the name "Teddy's bear" after receiving Roosevelt's permission to use his name. The story also reflects the history of the United States Secret Service, which was originally chartered to investigate counterfeiting and other financial crimes but assumed responsibility for the President's security after the assassination of William McKinley and Roosevelt's succession in September 1901.

The story also features two slightly edited quotations from Roosevelt's writings and speeches. When Roosevelt asks Scrooge why he works so hard despite already having made his fortune, Scrooge quotes back to him words from their meeting in 1883 (in "The Buckaroo of the Badlands"). (Note: In fact, those words do not appear in the earlier comic, but are instead taken from Roosevelt's 1899 speech afterwards titled "The Strenuous Life": I wish to preach, not the doctrine of ignoble ease, but the doctrine of the strenuous life, the life of toil and effort, of labor and strife; to preach that highest form of success which comes, not to the man who desires mere easy peace, but to the man who does not shrink from danger, from hardship, or from bitter toil, and who out of these wins the splendid ultimate triumph. Likewise, when Scrooge delivers a brief homily on the beauty of the jungle wilderness, Roosevelt asks permission to use his words in a later book, and Scrooge agrees. The text in the comic is a passage from Roosevelt's foreword to his memoir African Game Trails, published in 1910: There are no words that can tell the hidden spirit of the wilderness, that can reveal its mystery, its melancholy and its charm. There is a delight in the hardy life of the open... Apart from this, yet mingled with it, is the strong attraction of the silent places, of the large tropic moons, and the splendor of the new stars; where the wanderer sees the awful glory of sunrise and sunset in the wide waste spaces of the earth, unworn of man, and changed only by the slow change of the ages through time everlasting.) Not every detail follows the historical record. In "The Cowboy Captain of the Cutty Sark", the Sultan of Djokja is named as Mangkunagara V, although the Sultan at the time was in fact Hamengkubuwono VII; the error comes from Rosa's source, an 1890s travel story titled On the Subject of Java.

=== History and heritage ===
A concern with history and heritage also runs through the series. In his author's note to "The Dreamtime Duck of the Never Never", Rosa wrote that one of the traits that distinguish Scrooge from his nephew Donald Duck is Scrooge's interest in archaeology and respect for the importance of history. Rosa wanted to write an origin story for this aspect of Scrooge's character and, while doing so, realized that Aboriginal Australians have "probably a greater sense of their historical continuity than anyone else in the world".

This is reflected in the story itself. When Jabiru first shows Scrooge the cave and adds his hand print to the many others counting previous visitors, Scrooge does some calculation and is floored to realize that Aboriginal people have been visiting the cave continuously for over 20,000 years. After Scrooge recovers his Number One Dime, Jabiru reminds him that wisdom and riches can always be found in "the search for the past", and Scrooge declares himself firmly convinced.

== Censorship ==
In February 2023, The Walt Disney Company (the intellectual property holder of the character Scrooge McDuck) instated a worldwide ban on reprinting two of Rosa's duck stories: "The Empire-Builder from Calisota" (listed as "The Richest Duck in the World" in the announcement) and "The Dream of a Lifetime". Both stories were noted by Rosa to feature the character Bombie the Zombie, a zombie sent by the leader of a Voodoo tribe to haunt Scrooge, making future collections or reprints of Lo$ impossible as Rosa views the character to be integral to the story.

== Main storyline ==
=== The Last of the Clan McDuck ===
Original cover of The Last of the Clan McDuck

"The Last of the Clan McDuck" was first published in the Danish Anders And & Co. #1992-33, and its first American publication was in Uncle Scrooge #285 (April 1994). Its Inducks story code is D 91308, and it runs to 15 pages. The chapter is set in Glasgow, Scotland, from 1877 to 1880. Characters include Scrooge's mother, Downy O'Drake, and his uncle Jake McDuck, who both make their first appearance here (Jake had previously only been mentioned, in A Christmas for Shacktown), as well as Fergus McDuck, Hortense McDuck, Matilda McDuck, Seafoam McDuck, Sir Quackly McDuck, Swindle McSue, and the Whiskervilles.

As a child, Scrooge grows up in a poor family that has a rivalry with the Whiskervilles clan. When he gets his first job as a shoe shiner, his first customer presents him with extremely filthy work boots, but pays him with an American coin (a dime). Furious at being cheated, Scrooge makes a vow to always be "fair and square" in business and becomes much more cunning and gets more business. He later earns more money first by selling firewood and then by selling peat moss.

Family legend, meanwhile, states that the McDuck family was heir to a castle and large fortune. Quackly McDuck, one of their ancestors, determined to hide the treasure from thieves, sealed it away inside the castle (accidentally sealing himself away at the same time). The family was frightened away from the land by a "phantom hound" and, as a result, the treasure was lost while the castle fell to ruin.

While exploring the castle, Scrooge discovers that the hound only was a trick by the Whiskervilles, who wanted the McDuck family out of the way so that they could steal the hidden treasure. Encouraged by a strange keeper in the castle, Scrooge gets revenge for his family by filling a suit of armor with peat and setting it on fire, scaring the Whiskervilles into thinking it was a ghost. Inspired by the keeper, Scrooge decides to head for America on a cattle boat to earn his fortune. After Scrooge leaves the castle, the keeper reveals himself as Quackly McDuck, the ghost of the ancestor who was sealed away in the wall. When asked by the ghosts of the other ancestors why he didn't simply just show Scrooge the location of the treasure, he explains that the boy must earn his fortune himself.

=== The Master of the Mississippi ===
Original cover of The Master of the Mississippi

"The Master of the Mississippi" was first published in Denmark as Her er dit liv, Joakim on August 10, 1992, and its first American publication was in Uncle Scrooge #286 (June 1994). Its Inducks story code is D 91411, and it runs to 28 pages. The chapter is set from 1880 to 1882. Characters include the Beagle Boys, Porker Hogg, Angus McDuck, Blackheart Beagle, and Ratchet Gearloose.

In 1880, young Scrooge McDuck has traveled to America to seek his fortune. Making his way to New Orleans, he looks up his Uncle Angus "Pothole" McDuck, and helps him as a deckhand on his steamboat alongside the inventor and engineer Ratchet Gearloose, racing to be first to a site along the Mississippi River to salvage a shipment of gold from a ship that sank 30 years earlier while transporting it for the government. The Beagle Boys are also in pursuit of the gold and comes to fight Scrooge and Pothole about it.

After being caught by the Beagle Boys, Scrooge tricks them, and their riverboat is destroyed. In the end, no one gets the gold, as the government takes it back. Scrooge then takes full employment on Pothole's boat, and after a few years when Pothole retires, Scrooge buys it for himself. However, this just as the steam powered locomotives are gaining popularity as a mean of transportation and railroad is being laid across the nation, making riverboats somewhat obsolete.

During one later boat ride, Scrooge transports more government gold, when he comes across a lady giving away free firewood - a deal that Scrooge simply cannot resist. However, the lady turns out to be a Beagle Boy in disguise. The Beagle Boys takes the gold and locks Scrooge and Ratchet in the boiler room, after having loaded and locked shut one of the boilers full of pine knots and pitch - to make the boiler pressure overload and explode the boiler due to pressure. Scrooge and Ratchet seeks protection in the other boiler among loads of stuffed cotton.

In the meantime, the boat, only running on one boiler, makes a turn on the water and runs ashore, violently following the Beagle Boys across land. Upon reaching their hideout, the boiler - and with it, the boat - explodes. Scrooge and Ratchet, having hidden in the other boiler, are all right, while the Beagle Boys are taken to jail.

Since he no longer has a riverboat, Scrooge decides to move west, along the railroad and so he takes a job as a fireman on the Wabash Cannonball.

=== The Buckaroo of the Badlands ===
Original cover of The Buckaroo of the Badlands

"The Buckaroo of the Badlands" was first published in the Danish Anders And & Co. #1992-45, and its first American publication was in Uncle Scrooge #287 (August 1994). Its Inducks story code is D 92008, and it runs to 15 pages. The chapter is set from 1882 to 1883.

Fifteen-year-old Teenager Scrooge is traveling to the American West by train. During a conversation with a man who owns some square eggs, the train is robbed by Jesse James and his gang. Scrooge fights them, but falls off the train himself. He comes across some cowboys led by Murdo MacKenzie, transporting cattle and joins them, receiving his own horse, which he names after his sister Hortense, since they have the same bad temper.

He is placed in charge of security of a prize-winning bull, which is then stolen by the McViper brothers. Scrooge follows them to the badlands, where he meets Theodore Roosevelt who tells Scrooge about the satisfaction of earning wealth instead of simply inheriting it. They successfully rescue the bull and return it. Scrooge is then employed by MacKenzie as a cowboy on his farm.

=== The Raider of the Copper Hill ===
Original cover of The Raider of the Copper Hill

"The Raider of the Copper Hill" (also known as "The King of the Copper Hill") was first published in the Danish Anders And & Co. #1993-02, and its first American publication was in Uncle Scrooge #288 (October 1994). Its Inducks story code is D 92083, and it runs to 15 pages. The chapter is set from 1883 to 1885. Characters include Howard Rockerduck and the historical figures Murdo MacKenzie and Marcus Daly.

The competition in the cattle business in the Montana Territory is growing bigger, and less profitable. Sixteen-seventeen year old teenager Scrooge McDuck's employer, Murdo MacKenzie decides to quit, and therefore has to let Scrooge go. Scrooge is not sad, but decides to try his luck as a silver prospector. There is no luck in it, but he does find some copper. Eating dinner in town at night with Marcus Daly, owner of the shut down Anaconda Silver Mine which has found tonnes of copper, he does find out that the government is putting up electric wire, made of copper, making the price skyrocket.

Thus he again starts prospecting, but doesn't know how to dig the best way, until Howard Rockerduck gives him some help. They find a small copper vein, that is the same as that off the Anaconda Mine, which is making a lot of money. Rockerduck does know of the Apex law and due to this, Scrooge becomes the owner of the Anaconda Mine. He is however forced to sell it back to Marcus Daly for ten thousand dollars, as he receives a telegram from his father, asking him to come home, since there is a "terrible crisis for the Clan McDuck" going on.

Scrooge leaves for Scotland after five years in America, and as the ship sets sail from New York City he thinks to himself that a statue should be placed there, to welcome people seeking a chance to succeed on their own terms. Behind him - where he can't see it - the Statue of Liberty is under construction.

=== The New Laird of Castle McDuck ===
Original cover of The New Laird of Castle McDuck

"The New Laird of Castle McDuck" was first published in the Danish Anders And & Co. #1993-11, and its first American publication was in Uncle Scrooge #289 (December 1994). Its Inducks story code is D 92191, and it runs to 15 pages. The chapter is set in 1885.

Scrooge has traveled back to Scotland to help his family save the McDuck castle. During his dramatic fight against the clan's nemesis, the Whiskervilles, Scrooge again gets some help from the ghost of Sir Quackly McDuck, however, this leads to Scrooge falling into the moat and becoming unconscious. He dreams that he has died and gone to "McDuck Heaven", where his forefathers are playing golf on clouds. They decide to give him another chance in life. When he wakes up, Scrooge can't get up as he is weighed down by a suit of armor. He uses his first coin to unscrew its bolts. He then chases off the Whiskervilles, and pays the overdue taxes on the castle with the ten thousand dollars he got from selling a mine, just before coming back to Scotland.

At morning, Scrooge and his father looks out over Dismal Downs, where a rainbow is, and Scrooge decides to make his fortune again.

=== The Terror of the Transvaal ===
Original cover of The Terror of the Transvaal

"The Terror of the Transvaal" was first published in the Danish Anders And & Co. #1993-18, and its first American publication was in Uncle Scrooge #290 (February 1995). Its Inducks story code is D 92273, and it runs to 12 pages. The chapter is set from 1886 to 1889.

The Witwatersrand Gold Rush of 1886 takes Scrooge to Transvaal, South Africa. His cart is passed by a galloping Cape Buffalo with a Boer duck lashed to its back, screaming for help. Scrooge rescues the Boer and befriends him, not knowing that he was sent into the veld by diamond miners he was trying to steal from. Scrooge happily accepts his new friend's offer to keep watch when they camp for the night, but when he wakes up, his wagon, horse, and gear have all been stolen, and he has been left alone surrounded by wild animals.

Just as the animals are about to pounce, Scrooge's hurt gives way to fury and he makes a lifetime vow: "Nobody double-crosses Scrooge McDuck!" He tames the animals with his bare hands, then bridles a lion and rides it into the nearest town. Finding his cart, Scrooge retrieves his pistols and confronts the young Boer in a bar, then humiliates his rival by shooting jars of molasses and a pillow over him, producing the local equivalent of being tarred and feathered. Furious, the Boer runs back to the cart to grab Scrooge's rifle, but doesn't notice the lion in the stable until it's too late. Scrooge is forced to save the Boer from a severe mauling, before dragging him into the nearest jail. As Scrooge is leaving town, the young Boer yells from his cell that one day he'll be rich enough to take revenge on Scrooge and people like him. Scrooge dismisses this, but concedes that the young duck, whose name he still doesn't know, has taught him a valuable lesson: never trust anyone completely.

The story's closing narration reveals the young Boer to be Flintheart Glomgold, who will grow up to be the world's second richest duck, and Scrooge's nemesis.

=== The Dreamtime Duck of the Never Never ===
Original cover of The Dreamtime Duck of the Never Never

"The Dreamtime Duck of the Never Never" was first published in the Danish Anders And & Co. #1993-24, and its first American publication was in Uncle Scrooge #291 (April 1995). Its Inducks story code is D 92314, and it runs to 15 pages. The chapter is set from 1893 to 1896.

In the McDuck Clan ancestral castle in Scotland, Scrooge's father and uncle speak of Scrooge and his accomplishments, toasting to "the lad". Meanwhile, Scrooge has gone to Kalgoorlie, Australia, after hearing of gold being found there. In the middle of the desert, he rescues an aborigine wiseman, Jabiru Kapirigi, from being robbed by a highwayman.

Jabiru, or Jabby as Scrooge calls him, tells Scrooge that he is on a walkabout, reading the Dreamtime tale, and he wants Scrooge to join him. Scrooge, hoping to find gold where Jabby leads him, goes along. As the wiseman hands Scrooge a didgeridoo, Scrooge sarcastically replies "Great! Now I'm John Philip Sousa!", which Jabby takes literally, and hence, calls Scrooge by the name Jonflip Zooza.

Whilst blowing the didgeridoo, the sand beneath Scrooge crumbles to reveal an ancient cave. The two use a rope to climb down into the hole, where on the walls the Dreamtale is written. Jabby reads it aloud to Scrooge:

"It tells of Kakadu the dingo, he steals the crocodile egg from its nest!
But the great platypus chases Kakadu...
...and Irria, the black cockatoo, sends Bunyip, the water monster, after the egg thief!
Bunyip chases the dingo...
...and the great platypus finds the sacred egg, but loses his firstborn in the fight!

Scrooge dismisses it all as "pure humbug", and asks Jabby if the cave holds any gold. There is none, but Jabby points to a giant opal. Scrooge wishes to buy it, but their rope is being hauled up by the highwayman. Having heard of the opal, he orders them to send it up, and he will let them climb out. When he has the opal, however, he just throws the rope down. He then steals Scrooge's camel and all his things.

To get out, Scrooge blows Jabby's didgeridoo to summon an emu, then uses the emu to chase after the highwayman. When he rides off, Jabby asks Scrooge if he will return the opal, but Scrooge gives no answer. Come morning, the highwayman is searching through Scrooge's belongings and finds some coins. One, tied to a string that "isn't even Aussie", is Scrooge's number one dime. He throws the coins away just as Scrooge catches up with him, and ties a rope around the thief. As they turn around, the coins, including the one dime, lie in the sand, forgotten.

They ride for some time, before a kangaroo stampede passes by them. The camel then runs off with the highwayman, but Scrooge falls off. He hears a roar in the distant and, looking in his spyglass, sees that it's a flash flood from the mountains. He runs for shelter, and just barely makes it to the Dreamtale cave, which is then sealed off by the water and wet sand. Come morning he can again leave, climbing out on the wet sand. He ponders taking the giant opal for himself, as no one will know for a hundred years, but decides that he wants to make his fortune by right means, and leaves the opal behind.

Much later, at the edge of the desert, Scrooge encounters Jabby again, sitting by a campfire at the end of another Dreamtale cave. Jabby knows that Scrooge returned the opal, and when Scrooge tells him that he had lost his number one dime, Jabby wonders if it was like his firstborn. It is, and Scrooge realizes that he in fact is the great platypus from the Dreamtale. Scrooge realizes that the part of the Dreamtale that Jabby read him earlier actually foretold his adventure with the highwayman and the flash flood.

Jabby continues to tell Scrooge that the great platypus's firstborn was saved by Djuway, the bowerbird who builds his nest with shiny trinkets. Nearby is a bowerbird nest, and looking inside Scrooge finds his number one dime. Ecstatic, he wonders what else the Dreamtale says about the great platypus. As a reward for returning the egg (the opal), Scrooge is allowed to "see his dream through the crystal eye". Jabby casts sunlight upon a crystal of his, held by Scrooge against the wall of the cave. What Scrooge sees resembles the northern lights, and it tells him to go north of the Rocky Mountains, north to the Yukon.

As Scrooge leaves, singing happily to himself, Jabby looks at the Dreamtale, where there is a drawing resembling his money bin, and his nephews, Donald, Huey, Dewey and Louie. Jabby finds it confusing, and wonders what they have "to do with a poor, out of luck fossicker (prospector) like poor Jonflip".

=== The King of the Klondike ===
Original cover of The King of the Klondike

"The King of the Klondike" (also known as "The Argonaut of White Agony Creek") was first published on July 19, 1993, in the Danish Anders And & Co. #1993-29 and the Swedish Kalle Anka & C:o #1993-29, and its first American publication was in Uncle Scrooge #292 (June 1995). Its Inducks story code is D 92514, and it runs to 24 pages. The chapter is set from 1896 to 1897, before "The Prisoner of White Agony Creek" and "The Hearts of the Yukon". Characters include Goldie O'Gilt, Soapy Slick, and Casey Coot. This chapter was originally called "The Phoenix of White Agony Creek" until Rosa changed it to "The Argonaut of White Agony Creek" for its European publication, and then to its American title for the later American edition.

Arriving at Skagway, Alaska, Scrooge begins on his journey to Dawson City, Yukon, during which he meets Wyatt Earp, and they go to a saloon for a drink. Wyatt gets into a brawl with a thug who tries to mug the two, and Scrooge is forced to pay for the ensuing damage, leaving him broke again. He gets a loan from Soapy Slick, who leaves their contract open enough to get more money from him via a 100% interest rate.

Scrooge takes part in the Klondike Gold Rush, being mocked by Soapy along the way. However, he gets ahead of Soapy by using a makeshift didgeridoo to get to Dawson first. Hoping to best Scrooge, Soapy rents some space Glittering Goldie O'Gilt at her saloon for a loan-shark operation. She invites Scrooge in, but he blows her off.

Scrooge comes across a glacier, which contains an ice cave that he is told is by Casey Coot is too cold and dangerous to be safely traversed. He proceeds to do so, discovering inside a dead woolly mammoth. This takes him to White Agony Creek, where he begins his search for gold. During the winter, he goes to Dawson to buy tools to make a shed and a mine shaft. He finds Soapy doing business there and uses the gold he had found so far to pay off his interest, still unaware that he is working with Goldie. It is from here that Scrooge's harsher personality shades begin to develop, as he begins to speak to himself of destroying the creek for gain.

When Scrooge again goes to Dawson, now a bustling city, in Spring, he files a claim and finishes paying Soapy, ignoring the chaos going on around and the people shouting at him.

On his way back, Soapy knocks him out and takes him to his venue, where he wakes up chained and is taunted by Soapy and his henchmen. To further add salt to the wound, Soapy reads two letters from Scrooge's family: one from Downy, which reveals that the family has lost money and she is ill, and a second from Fergus, revealing that Downy has died. Enraged, Scrooge breaks free from his chains and destroys the entire venue. The entire city (including an impressed Goldie) watches in shock and silence as Scrooge personally drags Soapy all the way to jail for claimjumping, where he will be deported to Alaska and never allowed back in Canada.

After returning to White Agony Creek, Scrooge deals with some miners trying to steal from his shaft. To scare them away, he picks up a rock from his sluice, which feels surprisingly heavy, enough to be solid gold. Before he washes the mud off, he hesitates, knowing that if it is gold, he will be rich and his life will change forever. He wonders if he will be the same person, or if he will lose his respect for hard work and his appreciation for simple pleasures: "Do I really... want to be rich?" Deciding the answer is yes, he plunges the rock into the sluice, and is amazed to see it is a solid gold nugget, "as big as a goose egg!". As Scrooge's yells of triumph echo across the valley, the final panel shows a caption saying not "The end", but "The beginning...", signifying that Scrooge's quest to make his fortune has come to an end, to be followed by his quest to become the richest person in the entire world.

=== The Billionaire of Dismal Downs ===
Original cover of The Billionaire of Dismal Downs

"The Billionaire of Dismal Downs" was first published in the Danish Anders And & Co. #1993-45, and its first American publication was in Uncle Scrooge #293 (August 1995). Its Inducks story code is D 93121, and it runs to 15 pages. The chapter is set from 1898 to 1902. Characters include Fergus McDuck, Hortense McDuck, Matilda McDuck, and Scottie McTerrier.

Having struck it rich in the Klondike Gold Rush (see chapter 8, King of the Klondike), Scrooge goes home to Scotland. He tries to settle in Dismal Downs with his family, but after realizing that he doesn't fit in very well in Scotland any more, he hires Scottie McTerrier to look after the McDuck castle for him, while Scrooge and his sisters leave for a small, unseeming town called Duckburg located in Calisota, United States. Scrooge had recently bought a plot of land there from the founder's grandson while he was a sourdough in Alaska. The morning Scrooge and his sisters leave the McDuck castle, their father Fergus dies, joining his late wife and the rest of the Clan McDuck.

=== The Invader of Fort Duckburg ===
Original cover of The Invader of Fort Duckburg

"The Invader of Fort Duckburg" was first published in the Danish Anders And & Co. #1994-10, and its first American publication was in Uncle Scrooge #294 (October 1995). Its Inducks story code is D 93227, and it runs to 15 pages. The chapter is set in 1902. Characters include Blackheart Beagle, Humperdink Duck, Daphne Duck, Eider Duck, Fulton Gearloose, Grandma Duck, Hortense McDuck, Matilda McDuck, Quackmore Duck, the Beagle Boys, The Junior Woodchucks, and Theodore Roosevelt.

The first three Junior Woodchucks are expelled from their former headquarters, the ruins of Fort Duckburg, recently bought by Scrooge McDuck. To reclaim the fort, they appeal to a "higher authority" by wire, which turns out to be an all-ears U. S. President Theodore Roosevelt:

Attorney General William Henry Moody: They say a billionaire from Scotland has seized a military installation on the coast!
Roosevelt: Great jumping Jehoshaphat! The three dangers that I campaign strongest against - big business, foreign interference, and military threats to our shores - all rolled into one! Egad!

At the same time, the Beagle Boys - Blackheart Beagle's sons, recently released from jail - invade the Fort to steal Scrooge's barrels of money, but they are interrupted when the Fort is surrounded by the entire United States Army and Navy, as well as the Rough Riders, led by a furious Roosevelt in person.

After an enduring battle fought pretty much against Scrooge alone, eventually the President's troops fold against the infamous temper of Scrooge's sister Hortense. Roosevelt charges through the gate alone, only for he and Scrooge to recognize each other from their meeting in Montana years ago and fondly share a weenie roast inside the fort, which Matilda glumly says is not what she and Hortense had in mind when they imagined their newly wealthy family being invited to dine with the President.

When the McDuck siblings first arrive in Duckburg to inspect the property, Hortense also meets her future husband, farmer's son Quackmore Duck (Donald Duck's father).

=== The Empire-Builder from Calisota ===
Original cover of The Empire-Builder from Calisota

"The Empire-Builder from Calisota" (also known as "The Richest Duck in the World") was first published in the Danish Anders And & Co. #1994-15, and its first American publication was in Uncle Scrooge #295 (December 1995). Its Inducks story code is D 93288, and it runs to 24 pages. The chapter is set from 1909 to 1930. Characters include Scrooge's sisters Hortense McDuck and Matilda McDuck.

When Scrooge visits his Money Bin to see his progress on becoming the richest man in the world, Matilda and Hortense, tired of being left to watch the office while he goes globe-trotting, demand that he either stay in Duckburg to run his business empire, or let them accompany him on his next trip. He reacts to his new secretary Emily Quackfaster with shock and allows Hortense's fiancé Quackmore Duck the position as office manager only on the pretense that "his greedy hope for an inheritance will keep him honest".

Hearing of prime land for diamond mining in Africa, Scrooge takes his sisters with him there and down the Mumbo Jumbo River, where he purchases mining lands from a local tribe for a mere quarter-dollar. This shocks his sisters, to which he responds by dismissing how honest he was in the past due to how long it took for him to get rich, saying that he has "decided to develop new methods".

Scrooge goes to purchase more valuable land for rubber tree plantations from a voodoo tribe, but their chief, Foola Zoola, refuses to sell, angering Scrooge and getting him kicked out in front of his sisters. Humiliated, Scrooge returns with hired mercenaries to burn down the village and tricks Foola Zoola into signing the deed giving him their land, committing the one dishonest deed in his life. He returns to his campsite, only to find that his sisters have returned to Duckburg. Scrooge tries to justify himself with his hardships, but then he hears his deceased father Fergus talking to him about self-respect. Scrooge is ridden with guilt and hopes to make amends, but bumps into a zombie named Bombie, sent by Foola Zoola as his revenge. However, Scrooge is able to escape when Bombie is confused by his real appearance.

Scrooge goes to a railroad to follow his sisters home, but the next train back home won't leave for another week. He takes a cheaper ride by boat to Europe, where he spends a year increasing his profits. At the polar ice cap, he tries to finance Robert Peary's expedition so he can buy the North Pole, but is turned down. He then comes across Bombie again, and during another attempt to fool him with his appearance, Bombie falls into a crevice and gets sealed in ice. Later, Scrooge receives a telegram from Saint Petersburg inviting him to the palace of Czar Nicholas II of Russia, where he buys Fabergé eggs in bulk; Nicholas points Scrooge to the Candy-Striped Ruby that inspired the eggs, and Scrooge retrieves it from bandits in the Asian steppes.

Scrooge begins to return home on the RMS Titanic, it crashes into an iceberg containing Bombie, freeing him. As the Titanic sinks, so does Bombie, and Scrooge escapes on a boat, during which he realizes that a lot of cargo and treasure had gone down with the ship. Seeking opportunity, he delays his return home again to search the Titanic for treasure and continue his worldwide expedition. He begins to use a train to ship his collected money home. In Baghdad, he is attacked by bandits and shoved off a cliff, but lands inside one of the train's loads of money, and he develops his famous "money swim". He also tries this with a load of coal, only to wind up with a smashed noggin.

Years later, in the South Pacific, Scrooge makes an offer with a village chief for their coconuts, during which he comes across Bombie once again. He pays the chief his Candy-Striped Ruby in exchange for having the witch doctor cast a spell that will bind Bombie to their island for at least 30 years, freeing Scrooge to continue his global journey.

After 27 years of buying properties and increasing his profits, Scrooge finally returns home to a newly-grown Duckburg, now a cold, hard man. He rejects the key to the city (smashing it over the mayor's head) and blows off a large group of beggars in front of the Money Bin. He comes home to a welcoming gathering from his family, including Hortense and Quackmore's children Della and Donald. However, he ignores them too and orders Quackfaster to install booby traps outside for the beggars and give him an audit of the money in the Bin. Hortense yells at Scrooge for blowing them off, but he refuses to listen. Sickened by this, his family leaves, and Donald kicks him in the tailfeathers. After remembering his childhood, Scrooge is overwhelmed and goes to apologize, but he then finds out from a letter that he has passed the Maharajah of Howduyustan and finally achieved his life's goal: he is now the richest person in the world. Outside, his family leaves the money bin, with a member of the crowd gathered outside expresses envy at Scrooge, remarking that "he has everything". The comic ends with Matilda, hearing this, tearfully lamenting that "Scrooge McDuck once had everything. Now all he has is money and all that money can buy", as Scrooge can be heard inside, cackling in triumph.

=== The Richest Duck in the World ===
Original cover of The Richest Duck in the World

"The Richest Duck in the World" (also known as "The Recluse of McDuck Manor") was first published in the Danish Anders And & Co. #1994-22, and its first American publication was in Uncle Scrooge #296 (February 1996). Its Inducks story code is D 93488, and it runs to 16 pages. The chapter is set on Christmas Day, 1947. Characters include Donald Duck, Huey, Dewey, and Louie, and the Beagle Boys.

A TV news documentary discusses Scrooge's rise to prominence, ending with how he suddenly retired in 1942 and has spent the years since in seclusion in a palatial mansion on the outskirts of Duckburg. Five years later, Scrooge invites his nephew Donald and his grand-nephews Huey, Dewey, and Louie to his mansion after their stay at his cabin on Bear Mountain (shown by Barks in FC-178 "Christmas on Bear Mountain", 1947). When Donald dismisses him as just another miser who spent all his money on the mansion, Scrooge takes his nephews to his Money Bin, where he shows them his personal fortune - three cubic acres of cash, the money he had earned personally during his travels. Unfortunately, Scrooge and his family were followed by Blackheart Beagle and his Beagle Boys, all disguised as sidewalk Santas.

The Beagle Boys take Scrooge's Number One Dime and several sacks of his money, before locking Scrooge and his nephews inside a closet while they escape on sleighs. Provoked by Donald dismissing the contents of his old travel trunk (containing his old gear from his world travels) as "junk", Scrooge takes his old mining pick to break out and chase the Beagle Boys, with his nephews hauling the trunk on the Beagles' other sleigh. Showing off the skills he had learned in his youth, Scrooge reclaims the dime and his lost money, and turns the Beagle Boys over to the police. Re-energized by meeting his nephews (and rewarding Donald with a kick to his tailfeathers, as Donald had given to him in "The Empire-Builder from Calisota" 17 years earlier), Scrooge decides to sell his mansion and return to work, and promises to take his nephews on his next adventures.

== Companion stories ==
In addition to the twelve original chapters, Rosa wrote companion stories that fill gaps in the chronology. Their part numbers show where they fall in the storyline: part 3B, for instance, sits between chapters 3 and 4.

=== Of Ducks, Dimes and Destinies ===
"Of Ducks, Dimes and Destinies" had its first American publication in Uncle Scrooge #297. Its Inducks story code is D 91249, and it runs to 15 pages. The story is set in 1877, at the start of the original storyline.

Magica De Spell travels back in time to steal Scrooge's Number One Dime before he earns it. She convinces who would be Scrooge's first customer to hand over his dime to her in exchange for 2 shillings, which he uses at a nearby bar. Realizing that the dime would have no worth if Scrooge never earned it, she quickly places it back in his hand before returning to the present.

=== The Cowboy Captain of the Cutty Sark ===
Original cover of The Cowboy Captain of the Cutty Sark

"The Cowboy Captain of the Cutty Sark" was first published on December 11, 1998, in the Danish Anders And & Co. #1998-52 and #1998-53, and its first American publication was in Uncle Scrooge #318 (February 1999). Its Inducks story code is D 98045, and it runs to 24 pages. The story is set in August 1883, between "The Buckaroo of the Badlands" and "Raider of the Copper Hill", which makes it part 3B. Characters include Donald Duck, Huey, Dewey, and Louie, Ratchet Gearloose, and the historical figures Captain F.W. Moore, Sultan Mangkunagara V of Djokja, and Sultan Pakubuwana IX of Solo.

Scrooge exports some cattle from Montana to the Dutch East Indies (present Indonesia) but encounters a thief and meets his old friend Ratchet Gearloose from his riverboat days. Then he becomes part of a spectacular trip aboard the clipper ship Cutty Sark on August 26, 1883. However, Krakatoa becomes more active, and soon enough, the volcano violently explodes. Scrooge and Gearloose have to ride out the pyroclastic flow, tsunami, and the falling pumice, and in doing so help the Cutty Sark survive the eruption.

=== The Vigilante of Pizen Bluff ===
"The Vigilante of Pizen Bluff" had its first American publication in Uncle Scrooge #306. Its Inducks story code is D 96089, and it runs to 24 pages. The story is set in 1890, and as part 6B it falls between chapters 6 and 7.

Scrooge returns to the United States and joins with Phineas Taylor Barnum, his Uncle Pothole, Geronimo, Buffalo Bill, and Annie Oakley on a mission to recover stolen money from the Dalton Gang.

=== The Prisoner of White Agony Creek ===
Original cover of The Prisoner of White Agony Creek

"The Prisoner of White Agony Creek" was first published on May 3, 2006, in the Danish Anders And & Co. #2006-22, and its first American publication was in the The Life and Times of Scrooge McDuck Companion collection in 2006. Its Inducks story code is D 2005-061, and it runs to 33 pages. The story is set in 1897, between "The King of the Klondike" and "Hearts of the Yukon", which makes it part 8B. Characters include Goldie O'Gilt, Donald Duck, Huey, Dewey and Louie, Soapy Slick, and the historical figures Wyatt Earp, Bat Masterson, and Roy Bean. As Don Rosa announced his retirement in June 2008, this is his last story to date.

While helping to tidy the Money Bin, Huey, Dewey and Louie notice an old steamer trunk of Scrooge McDuck's keepsakes, and ask him what his most valuable possession is. Donald guesses that it is his Number One Dime, while one of the boys guesses the Goose Egg Nugget. The boys remember that Scrooge told them (in "Back to the Klondike") how the Nugget was stolen from him, and he retrieved it from Goldie O'Gilt, then took her to his claim and forced her to mine gold to show her how hard miners work to earn their living. The boys realize that Goldie was on Scrooge's claim for a whole month, but Scrooge never told them what happened during that month. This plunges Scrooge into a memory:

In 1897, during the Klondike Gold Rush, Scrooge forces Goldie to walk to his claim in White Agony Creek. She pretends to agree, plotting to re-steal his Goose Egg Nugget and the deed to his claim, once she finds out where he keeps them. In the days that follow, they gradually come to respect each other's toughness (though they refuse to admit it to themselves, let alone each other). When a wild bear seizes Goldie by the hair, Scrooge throws his bowie knife, severing a lock of her hair and scaring the bear away.

Meanwhile, Soapy Slick, still exiled from Canada after the events of "The King of the Klondike", sends three famous lawmen - Wyatt Earp, Bat Masterson, and Judge Roy Bean - to rescue Goldie from Scrooge, painting him as an unscrupulous kidnapper. But when they arrive, Goldie doesn't want to be rescued (since she doesn't yet have the Nugget or the deed). Scrooge outfoxes the three "legends" of the West, much to Goldie's enthrallment. At the same time, Butch Cassidy and the Sundance Kid, also recruited by Soapy, kidnap Goldie and steal Scrooge's strongbox, holding both the Nugget and the deed. But Scrooge eventually rescues Goldie and gets his strongbox back. When Goldie points out that the outlaws' dog sled is about to go over a waterfall, and he must rescue "them", Scrooge agrees, dashes back, and cuts the dogs loose, leaving Butch and Sundance to go over the falls. The ice floes dislodged by the fight hurtle downriver and wreck Soapy's riverboat. After matching wits with Scrooge, Butch and Sundance resolve to leave not just Canada, but all of North America behind and seek safer opportunities in South America.

Returning to Scrooge's claim, Goldie discombobulates Scrooge with a kiss (which leaves her almost as discombobulated), allowing Earp, Masterson, and Bean to knock him unconscious. Goldie eagerly opens his strongbox, finding both the Nugget and the deed. Remembering that Scrooge spent hours every night gazing at something inside the box that was even more valuable to him, she eagerly opens the folded piece of paper, and sees that it is the severed lock of her hair. When the three lawmen call for her to join them on their return trip, she refuses to go.

The next morning, Scrooge awakens in a panic, believing that Goldie is long gone with his strongbox, but is surprised to see she is still in his cabin, fixing breakfast for him. Believing she is still after his valuables, he accuses her of drugging his food again and refuses to touch it. In a fury, Goldie kisses him again, then punches him. Waiting outside, the three lawmen listen to the sounds of a furious fight, which tapers off into a silence that lasts through the day and the night (surprisingly for a Disney comics story, the scene implies a sexual tryst between Scrooge and Goldie). The next day, Scrooge reluctantly tells Goldie that she has to leave, since her being with there is dangerous for both of them. In a reprise of a panel from "Back to the Klondike", Scrooge pays her her wages for her month of work, which she throws back in his face and stomps off, declaring she dug more gold than he did - careful to keep her back to Scrooge so he cannot see the tears in her eyes.

Back in the present, Donald and his nephews ask Scrooge to confirm whether his money bin, his Number One Dime, the Goose Egg Nugget, or Castle McDuck back in Scotland is his most valuable possession. Scrooge looks down at the lock of Goldie's hair, which he still has after so many years, smiles fondly, and simply says, "no".

=== Hearts of the Yukon ===
"Hearts of the Yukon" had its first American publication in Walt Disney Giant #1. Its Inducks story code is D 95044, and it runs to 24 pages. The story is set in 1898, and as part 8C it follows "The Prisoner of White Agony Creek".

Scrooge is falsely accused to the Mounties of tracking mud in Dawson. He plans to clear his name by any means and thinks that Glittering Goldie O'Gilt is the one that framed him.

=== The Sharpie of the Culebra Cut ===
"The Sharpie of the Culebra Cut" was first published in 2001 in the French Picsou Magazine #349, and its first American publication was in Uncle Scrooge No. 332 (August 2004). Its Inducks story code is F PM 01201, and it runs to 26 pages. The story is set in 1906. Rosa intended it as an "in-between" story to accompany his anthology The Life and Times of Scrooge McDuck, happening chronologically between "The Invader of Fort Duckburg" and "The Empire-Builder from Calisota", which makes it part 10B. Characters include Hortense McDuck, Matilda McDuck, Donald Duck, Huey, Dewey, and Louie, and the historical figures Theodore Roosevelt and Chief Parita.

Scrooge McDuck, along with his sisters Hortense McDuck and Matilda McDuck, are mining for gold in Panama, which has just recently separated from Colombia and become independent. At the same time, the construction of the Panama Canal is underway as a joint operation between Panama and the United States, and President Theodore Roosevelt has personally come to inspect the construction of the Culebra Cut. Scrooge has legal claim to a mountain which stands in the way of the canal, so Roosevelt wants to come into agreement with him so that he can give the mountain to the United States and the construction of the canal can proceed.

Roosevelt makes a secret personal deal with Scrooge: he will help Scrooge mine gold faster, so that when his mining has been completed, he can give the mountain away to the United States. To this end, Roosevelt and Scrooge steal an excavator, with which Scrooge can mine a lot faster than with his old pickaxe. The excavator goes out of control, so Roosevelt and Scrooge end up in the lands of the Guyami Indians. Chief Parita, the leader of the Guyami, doesn't trust Scrooge, so Roosevelt makes an agreement with him instead. The Guyami chief is instantly impressed by a visit from "the Chief of the United States", and entrusts Roosevelt with the location of "Gold Hill". Roosevelt and Scrooge start mining gold with the excavator, but the mountain collapses from the strain, revealing an ancient pre-Columbian giant jaguar sculpture full of magnificent riches.

Scrooge wants to claim all this to himself, while Roosevelt wants to preserve the riches in a museum. They start a fight, but this is cut short when the sculpture becomes loose and falls off the mountain. In Roosevelt's absence, distrust has broken out between the United States and Panama, and a war is about to start. However, the sculpture arrives right into the scene and a war is avoided. To keep the treasure safe from looters, Roosevelt uses the canal excavation equipment to re-bury the jaguar statue in rubble, planning to hide its location in the Presidential archives, to be sealed for a century, and confidently predicting world peace by 2006, when it will be safe to reveal the treasure (though Scrooge remains privately skeptical).

As thanks for avoiding a war with Panama, Roosevelt agrees to give Scrooge whatever he wants. Unfortunately, Scrooge passes out from accidentally drinking chicha instead of brandy, so Hortense and Matilda choose for him instead: a teddy bear, which they saw earlier while being entertained by the First Lady and thought was cute, and see as an appropriate snub to their brother's worsening greed.

Decades after, in the present day, Scrooge rues his possession of the teddy bear as a memento of "the worst deal I ever made", but when his three grandnephews tell him that Roosevelt's teddy bear is the first of its kind in the world, Scrooge jumps at the chance at putting it in a museum and earning huge profits from entrance fees, much to Donald's dismay.

== Collected editions ==
Collections
Publication date	Title	Publisher	Format	Number of volumes	Included content	Reproduction	ISBN	INDUCKS link
1996	The Life and Times of Scrooge McDuck	Gladstone Publishing	Deluxe hardcover album 8.75 × 11.25 inches 223 × 286 mm	1	Chapter 1 - 12	Color		
July 2005 - September 2006	The Life and Times of Scrooge McDuck	Gemstone Publishing	Softcover 6.5 × 10.1 inches 165 × 257 mm	2	Vol .1 - Chapter 1 - 12; Vol. 2 - Companion chapters	Color	Vol. 1 0-911903-96-8; Vol. 2 1-888472-40-5	Vol. 1 Vol. 2
March 2010 - December 2010	The Life and Times of Scrooge McDuck	BOOM! Studios	Hardcover 7 × 10.5 inches 178 × 267 mm	3	Vol. 1 - Chapter 1 - 6 Vol. 2 - Chapter 7 - 12; Vol. 3 - Companion chapters	Color	Vol. 1 978-1-60886-538-3; Vol. 2 978-1-60886-542-0; Vol. 3 978-1-60886-653-3	Vol. 1 Vol. 2 Vol. 3
June 24, 2015	The Life and Times of Scrooge McDuck Artist's Edition	IDW Publishing	Hardcover 14 × 22 inches 356 × 559 mm	1	Vol. 1 - Chapter 1 - 6	Full color scans of original Black-and-white artwork	Vol. 1 978-1-63140-301-9	Vol. 1
April 9, 2019 - October 29, 2019	The Complete Life and Times of Scrooge McDuck	Fantagraphics Books	Hardcover 8.5 × 11 inches 216 × 279 mm	2	Vol. 1 - Chapter 1 - 12 Vol. 2 - Companion chapters + Last Sled to Dawson, The Dream of a Lifetime, Of Ducks and Dimes and Destinies, A Letter from Home	Color	Vol. 1 978-1-68396-174-1; Vol. 2 978-1-68396-253-3; Set (Vol. 1+2) 978-1-68396-254-0	Vol. 1 Vol. 2
November 16, 2021	The Complete Life and Times of Scrooge McDuck Deluxe Edition	Fantagraphics	Hardcover (with slipcase) 10.75 x 14.5 inches 273 × 368 mm	1	Chapter 1 - 12 + Companion chapters+ Last Sled to Dawson, The Dream of a Lifetime, Of Ducks and Dimes and Destinies, A Letter from Home	Color	978-1-68396-465-0	

The series has also been collected in volumes 4 and 5 of The Don Rosa Library (published by Fantagraphics as Uncle Scrooge and Donald Duck: The Don Rosa Library), where "The Last of the Clan McDuck" and "The Richest Duck in the World" served as the title stories of volumes 4 and 5 respectively.
