= North of the Yukon =

North of the Yukon may refer to:

- North of Hudson Bay, a 1923 film starring Tom Mix that was released in Great Britain as North of the Yukon
- North of the Yukon (1939 film), a 1939 film
- The Legend of Amaluk, a 1972 film later retitled North of the Yukon
- North of the Yukon (Disney comics), a 1965 Scrooge McDuck comic
