= Murdo MacKenzie =

Cattle baron

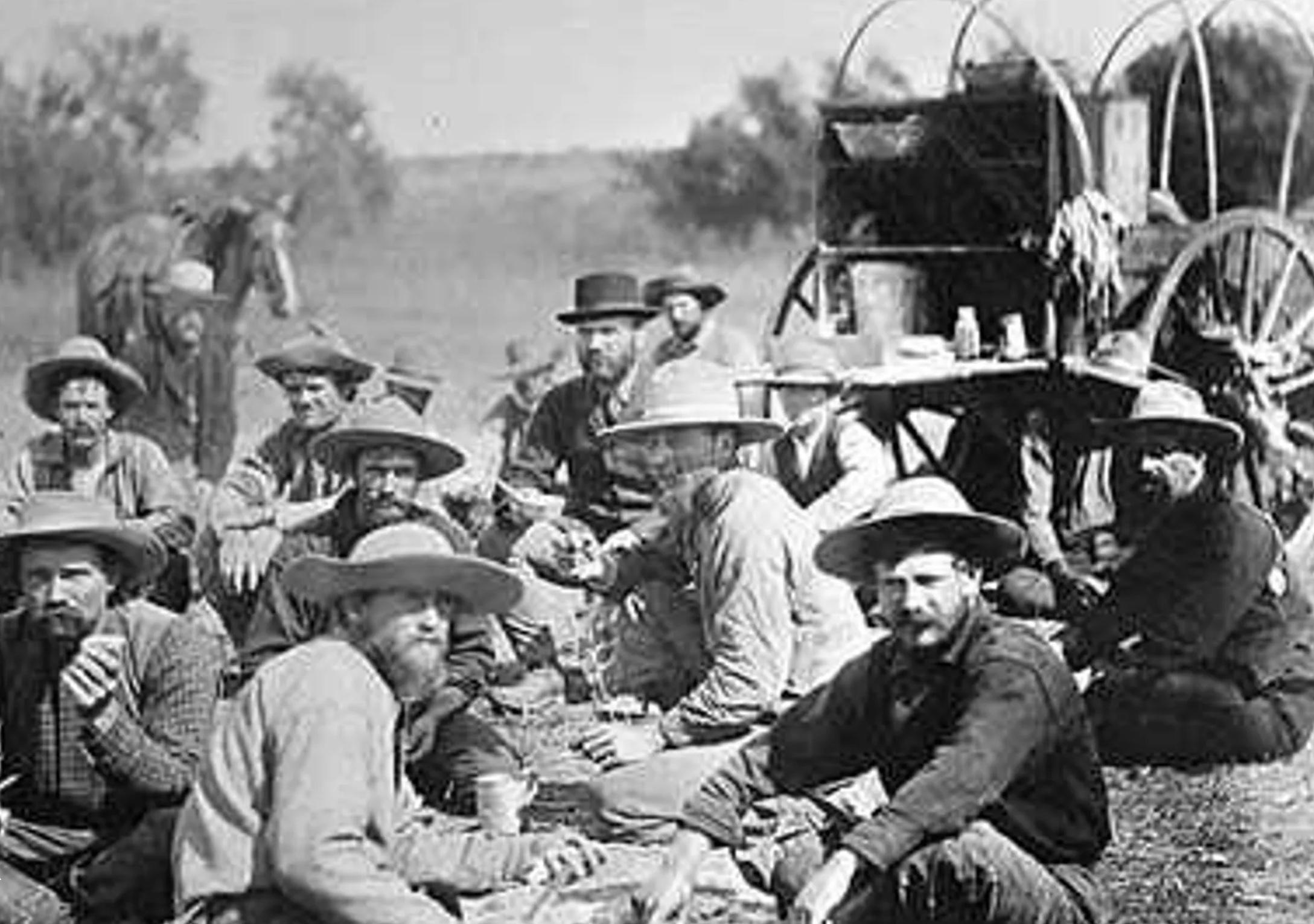
Murdo MacKenzie (black hat) and cowboys at the Matador Ranch chuck wagon, 1891

Murdo MacKenzie (April 24, 1850 – May 30, 1939) was twice (1891–1901 and 1922–1937) manager of the Scots-owned Matador Land and Cattle Company, and founding president of the American Stock Growers Association, for whom he testified before congress and the Interstate Commerce Commission. His testimony led to passage of the Hepburn Act of 1906 which eased railroad fares for western shippers.

President Theodore Roosevelt appointed him to the National Conservation Commission in 1908, and it was Mackenzie, then manager of the Brazil Land, Cattle and Packing Company, with whom Roosevelt stayed when he visited Brazil in 1913.

== Biography ==
MacKenzie was born near Tain, Ross-shire, Scotland, where he attended parish school and graduated from the Tain Royal Academy in 1869. He served in a law office and in the British Linen Bank, then as factor for Sir Charles Ross's estate at Balnagown Castle. He married Isabella Stronach MacBain in 1876 and fathered five children with her. Among these was his son, David G. (Dode) MacKenzie, who, in December 1909, was shot in LeBeau, South Dakota, while also working for Matador.

He sailed to the United States in 1885 to accept an offer to manage the Prairie Land and Cattle Company in Trinidad, Colorado. After becoming a naturalized citizen, he was elected mayor of Trinidad in 1891, before accepting the directorship at Matador.

He died, aged 89, in 1939 in Denver, Colorado, where he is buried.

The town of Murdo, South Dakota was named for Mackenzie.

In 1981, he was inducted into the Hall of Great Westerners of the National Cowboy & Western Heritage Museum.

== In popular culture ==
MacKenzie appears as a character in the fictional Scrooge McDuck comic book The Buckaroo of the Badlands (1992), set in 1882–1883, in which the poor, newly hired Scrooge, helped by Theodore Roosevelt, rescues a championship bull belonging to MacKenzie. At the beginning of Raider of the Copper Hill (1993), set in 1884, Scrooge leaves Mackenzie to prospect for copper while his former employer drives his herd to Texas.
