= Only a Poor Old Man =

1952 Uncle Scrooge comic book story by Carl Barks

- Story code: W OS 386-02
- Story: Carl Barks
- Ink: Carl Barks
- Date: September 27, 1951
- Hero: Scrooge McDuck
- Pages: 32
- Layout: 4 rows per page
- Appearances: Scrooge McDuck; Donald Duck; Huey, Dewey and Louie; Beagle Boys
- First publication: March 1952

"Only a Poor Old Man" is a 32-page Disney comics story written, drawn, and lettered by Carl Barks. It was published in Four Color #386 (March 1952) as the first issue of Uncle Scrooge. Scrooge McDuck had already made his debut as a supporting character in the 1947 Donald Duck story "Christmas on Bear Mountain", and made several other appearances in Donald Duck stories in Walt Disney's Comics and Stories, but "Poor Old Man" was the first comic book story with Scrooge as the main character.

In this first story with Scrooge as the focus, Barks softened the character, making him appear emotionally and financially vulnerable, rather than the ruthless miser that he had been in previous guest appearances.

The story has been reprinted many times. It was originally published with the one-page gag stories "Osogood Silver Polish", "Coffee for Two", and "Soupline Eight".

Barks expert Michael Barrier has dubbed the story a masterpiece.

== Plot ==
The story begins with Scrooge McDuck swimming in his money bin, speaking his now-famous line, "I love to dive around in it like a porpoise, and burrow through it like a gopher, and toss it up and let it hit me on the head!" He is watched by his nephew Donald, and they discuss the relative merits of having so much money.

While looking through the window, Scrooge is alarmed to see that the Beagle Boys have bought the lot next to his money bin. Scrooge understands that they plan to build a house on it, so they can secretly drain Scrooge's money out of the bin. Scrooge immediately faints.

His three grandnephews ask Scrooge why he is so attached to his money, and he explains that to him it's not just money: his fortune is the result of a long life of hard work and canny action. Every coin is a memento of an adventure. "You'd love your money, too, if you got it the way I did – by thinking a little harder than the other guy, by jumping a little quicker –" Scrooge also repeats another of his now-famous mantras: he made his fortune by being "tougher than the toughies and smarter than the smarties! And I made it square!"

After calming down, Scrooge forms a plan: with his nephews' help, he installs a chute that allows him to empty the bin slowly. They observe the trucks the Beagle Boys are using, which end up dumping the extra dirt at the lake. Scrooge buys the lake, then empties a load of money every time a truck drives by. When the Beagles finish their building, they eagerly begin their robbery, only to be appalled to find an empty money bin.

However, Scrooge is not at peace. Worrying that the mud at the bottom of the lake will ruin the banknotes, he has the money brought up loads at a time and the banknotes placed in glass jars before being re-sunk, which was a lesson he learned when exploring a sunken Spanish galleon that had documents which were still readable. Still, with his money on the bottom of the lake, Scrooge begins to miss his daily swim in the coins. To make up for it, he decides to create a temporary money island. Meanwhile, the Beagle Boys are frustrated that they have searched everywhere and failed to find the money. One of them elects to stop obsessing over it by going fishing. When he sees the lake he considered fishing was heavily fenced, then spots Scrooge playing on a money island, he realizes he chanced upon the money.

Feeling all is at peace, Donald and the nephews demand their back pay. Scrooge tries to do so by saying they can keep whatever of his money they fish out (not realizing this is the spot where the cheap coins were hidden), until they hear a shout of "Can we go fishing too?" from the Beagle Boys. Scrooge immediately rehires the nephews to help him guard the lake. The Beagle Boys buy the land in the valley downstream from the lake, showing that their plan is to destroy a dam at the end, causing the water and the money to flow down onto their property.

Scrooge and his nephews defend against the Beagle Boys' varied assaults on the dam: first, they use a giant magnifying glass suspended from a weather balloon to focus sunlight on the dam, hoping to burn it. Donald shatters the glass with a shot from an old-fashioned cannon.

Next, they force a bomb down the gullet of a fish and send it swimming toward the dam. Luckily, Dewey is fishing, and manages to pull out the bomb and throw it away before it explodes. Scrooge tells him to chase all the other fish downstream and then string a net across.

Third, the Beagle Boys use trained cormorants who first steal beakfuls of change from the lake, then carry napalm bombs toward the dam. Scrooge, who learned cormorant language while trading pearls in Asia, orders the cormorants to turn around and drop their bombs on the Beagle Boys.

Fourth, the Beagle Boys seed the clouds, causing a thunderstorm, hoping a lightning bolt will be drawn to the metal in the lake, and set the dam ablaze. Scrooge installs a large lightning rod atop the dam, wired to a cannonball which fires into the Beagle Boys' backyard.

The Beagle Boys turn to Plan Five: breeding super-termites. They publish a story in the newspaper about how termites nest in wooden dams, scaring Scrooge. He orders Donald to go into town and find a means to prevent this, and Donald buys the super termites from the disguised Beagle Boys, thinking they are a termite-eating insect, and they chew through the dam. They are unable to repair the dam quickly enough, and it breaks, sending all the money flowing down onto the Beagle Boys' land.

Scrooge, to his nephews' surprise, decides to admit defeat, and invites them to come along while he congratulates the winners. The Beagle Boys crow over him, and as he gazes nostalgically at his money, he confesses that what he will miss most is swimming around in it. The Beagle Boys are intrigued, more so when Scrooge demonstrates. They decide to take a dive in themselves – and end up bashing their heads on the hard, unyielding surface of the coins. They will be unconscious for months, more than enough time for Scrooge to transport the money back onto his land. When his nephews ask how he can dive through the money while the Beagle Boys couldn't, he admits, "it's a trick."

Scrooge pays his nephews their wages and, as they leave, Donald remarks that Scrooge's money is nothing but trouble, for all the work it takes to guard and preserve. Scrooge dismisses this advice, declaring "No man is poor who can do what he likes to do once in a while!" He then goes back to gleefully swimming through his money.

== Production ==
In a 1975 interview, Barks explained the story's origin: "They wrote a letter from the office and asked if I would do a thirty-two-page Scrooge comic book. And I thought, what little I had used Scrooge up to that time, he didn't have any foundation; nobody knew where he came from, although he had been Donald's uncle all these years. But what was his background? So I thought, well, I'll just work in a little bit about where he came from, how he accumulated his wealth, and how he's out to protect it — I had already invented the Beagle Boys at that time. And so I just turned loose on everything I could think of that would help develop Scrooge's character."

== Editions ==
The story's main editions in the United States, by publisher:

Dell Comics

- One Shots 386 - Uncle Scrooge #1 (March 1952)

Western/Gold Key Comics

- Uncle Scrooge and Donald Duck #1 (September 1965)
- The Best of Walt Disney Comics #72 (1974)

Whitman Publishing

- Uncle Scrooge #195 (March 1982)

Another Rainbow/Gladstone Publishing

- Carl Barks Library (hardcover, b/w) #3 (December 1984)
- Gladstone Comic Album #20 (April 1989)
- Uncle Scrooge Adventures #33 (July 1995)
- The Adventures of Uncle Scrooge McDuck in Color #1 (February 1996)
- Donald Duck and Uncle Scrooge - The Best And Firsts #1 (1996)
- The Biggest Big Walt Disney's Comics #1 (1998)

Gemstone Publishing

- Free Comic Book Day (Gemstone) #3 - Uncle Scrooge (May 2005)

Fantagraphics Books

- The Complete Carl Barks Disney Library #12 (2012)

== Adaptation ==
Elements of the story were incorporated into the episode "Liquid Assets" of the television series DuckTales.

== See also ==
- Only a Poor Old Man served as the title story to Fantagraphics The Complete Carl Barks Disney Library Vol. 12 - "Only a Poor Old Man" (2012)
- List of Disney comics by Carl Barks
