= Scrooge McDuck and Money =

- Directed by: Hamilton Luske
- Written by: Bill Berg
- Produced by: Walt Disney
- Starring: Bill Thompson; Dick Beals; The Mellomen (songs)
- Music by: Franklyn Marks; Mel Leven (songs)
- Production company: Walt Disney Productions
- Distributed by: Buena Vista Distribution
- Release date: March 23, 1967
- Running time: 16 minutes
- Country: United States
- Language: English

Scrooge McDuck and Money is an American animated short film produced by Walt Disney Productions, directed by Hamilton Luske, and featuring the characters Scrooge McDuck and Huey, Dewey, and Louie. The short was released on March 23, 1967. It is notable for being the first major animated debut of Scrooge McDuck after his brief appearance in the Mickey Mouse Club Theme song.

== Synopsis ==
The cartoon begins as Huey, Dewey, and Louie visit their wealthy Uncle Scrooge McDuck in his bank vault and explain that they want to deposit their money, which totals a considerable $1.95. Scrooge discusses the history of money, explaining that ancient Roman soldiers were paid in salt that was called "salarium" (Roman soldiers were not in fact paid in salt), which led to the phrase "worth his salt" ("worth his salt" is an 18th-century coinage, unrelated to Ancient Rome) and where the word "salary" came from. He then adds that a Spanish piece of eight is made up of smaller "bits", and that ancient Greek obols were tiny enough to be carried in the mouth. Scrooge also shows his nephews a large stone wheel from the Island of Yap.

Going even further back in time, he explains that earliest cavemen attempted to trade goods with one another but soon realized that they "needed money" or a stable standard of value at which to price different items. Many different objects of silver, copper, bronze and gold were used as currency until eventually coins and paper bills were invented, and cheques and credit cards came along when it became impractical to carry one's cash around at all times.

When the nephews suggest simply printing "a few billion more dollars", Scrooge explains that a billion is actually far more than they think and that making more money would lead to dangerous inflation. He describes that it is what people can buy with what they've got is what counts, and that it is a question of economics, and how one must balance one's budget like the pieces of a pie to live comfortably, adding that income tax pays for everything from schools to roads and must be factored in as well. He clarifies that his enormous vault holds only "petty cash" and that money must circulate "like ocean currents" to keep the world moving, and advises his nephews to invest their money very wisely to make it grow. He then agrees to deposit it for them—for a 3¢ fee. Scrooge concludes that investing wisely is an art.

== Voice cast ==
- Bill Thompson as Scrooge
- Dick Beals as Huey, Dewey, and Louie

== History ==
Scrooge McDuck and Money is Scrooge McDuck's first animated appearance (apart from a brief cameo appearance on the Mickey Mouse Club television series), and the only time he would appear with Huey, Dewey, and Louie until Sport Goofy in Soccermania and DuckTales twenty years later. It was also one of the first cartoons that the studio released after Walt Disney's death.

This short is often believed to have been attached to theatrical screenings of The Jungle Book, but the animation historian Jerry Beck has disputed this due to that film's October release date (Scrooge McDuck and Money was released in March 1967), instead suggesting that the short was likely attached and released theatrically with either The Adventures of Bullwhip Griffin or The Gnome-Mobile earlier that year.

== See also ==
- List of American films of 1967
