= The Dream of a Lifetime =

2002 Donald Duck comic

- Story code: D 2002-033
- Story: Don Rosa
- Ink: Don Rosa
- Hero: Donald Duck
- Pages: 25
- Layout: 4 rows per page
- Appearances: Scrooge McDuck; Donald Duck; Huey, Dewey and Louie; Gyro Gearloose; Beagle Boys
- First publication: 2002

"The Dream of a Lifetime" is a 2002 Donald Duck comic by Don Rosa. The story was first published in the Danish Anders And & Co. #2002-49; the first American publication was in Uncle Scrooge #329, in May 2004.

It is famous for sharing many similarities with the blockbuster Christopher Nolan film Inception, which was released eight years later in 2010.

In February 2023 The Walt Disney Company banned this story from all future reprints, because it utilizes the Carl Barks-created character Bombie the Zombie, who is now considered culturally insensitive.

== Plot ==
While Scrooge McDuck is having a dream, the Beagle Boys invade his dream, via a device stolen from Gyro Gearloose, in order to steal the combination to his money bin. Since it is extremely difficult for a dreamer to stop themselves from correctly answering questions posed to them in dreams (according to the in-story dream science), Donald Duck must enter his uncle Scrooge's dream to prevent Uncle Scrooge from blabbing the combination to the Beagle Boys.

== Similarities with Inception ==
Several similarities have been noted to Christopher Nolan's film Inception, including the plot similarities of entering dreams to steal secrets and falling to exit dreams. The idea of Inception, however, was allegedly pitched to Warner Bros. by Nolan in 2001, while Rosa's comic was first published in 2002. Rosa himself mentions that Inception was already being worked on by the time the comic was published, and credits the story idea to a fan from Paris who wrote him a pitch, but refused to be credited (Rosa states that he has hidden the fan's initials in the comic). Rosa also notes similarities between the comic and the plot of The Cell, and observes that the movie was released two weeks before the fan sent his pitch to him.
