= Christmas on Bear Mountain =

Donald Duck story by Carl Barks

- "Christmas on Bear Mountain" comic book cover. Cover art by an unknown artist, probably Dan Gormley.
- Story code: W OS 178-02
- Story: Carl Barks
- Ink: Carl Barks
- Date: 1947
- Hero: Donald Duck
- Pages: 20
- Layout: 4 rows per page
- Appearances: Donald Duck; Huey, Dewey and Louie; Scrooge McDuck (debut)
- First publication: Four Color Comics #178; December, 1947

"Christmas on Bear Mountain" (1947) is a Donald Duck story by Carl Barks, first published in Dell Comics Four Color Comics #178. It was the first appearance of Scrooge McDuck, a character who became a comic-book icon throughout the world.

Scrooge did not yet have his familiar characteristics in his first comic story. In "Christmas on Bear Mountain", Scrooge was a bearded, bespectacled, reasonably wealthy old man, visibly leaning on his cane. He was living in isolation in a "huge mansion", which is said to be influenced by Xanadu from Orson Welles's Citizen Kane. Scrooge has always been a somewhat bitter character, but his misanthropic thoughts in this first story are probably less characteristic of Scrooge than those of his rival Flintheart Glomgold: "Here I sit in this big lonely dump, waiting for Christmas to pass! Bah! That silly season when everybody loves everybody else! A curse on it! Me—I'm different! Everybody hates me, and I hate everybody!"

== Plot ==
As usual, Donald does not have enough money to celebrate Christmas with his three nephews. But, they are unexpectedly invited by his Uncle Scrooge to his chalet on the Bear Mountain. The misanthropic rich duck wants to stifle his boredom this Christmas by testing his nephew's courage, and plans to dress up as a bear. But a bear cub sneaks in the cabin as the ducks get a Christmas tree. Eventually, the mother comes looking for the cub, and scares the Ducks out of the cabin. The bears eat the food in the house and the mother bear falls asleep in front of the fireplace.

The Ducks make a plan to get the bears out of the cabin, with Donald having to tie the legs of the mother bear together while Huey, Dewey, and Louie catch the cub. Donald fails to tie the bear's legs and faints onto the animal, giving an impression that he fell asleep on it.

Meanwhile, Scrooge comes in and finds the boys chasing the cub, thinking that they are fearless. Then he finds Donald asleep with the bear and thinks he is purposely sleeping with the animal, coming to believe that Donald does not know the meaning of fear. Scrooge retreats unnoticed and returns the next day to spend Christmas Dinner in his mansion with his nephews.

== Development ==
In a 1962 interview, Barks said that he had no thoughts of making Scrooge a recurring character at the time. "I just needed a rich uncle for the story I was going to do. I thought of this situation of Donald having to do with Christmas, and Donald getting involved with a bear up in the mountains. Somebody had to own this cabin he was going to, so I invented Uncle Scrooge as the owner of the cabin."

Barks expanded on this in a 1975 interview: "I had to get a Christmas story going, and somehow a person just automatically goes back to the old Dickens Scrooge story, the old classic, 'cause part of the things that go along with Christmas, like the ringing of bells and singing of carols and so on, is the repetition of the old Scrooge classic. So I got to thinking of an old rich uncle, and gradually the story just kept building... I can't say where these things come from. I have a situation that has to be solved, and somehow all the parts just commence coming into my head from someplace and I just fit them together, and pretty soon I had fitted together a story of the ducks getting permission from their rich uncle to go up on Bear Mountain and use his cabin overnight. Well, that, of course, meant that the rich uncle had to have a reason for doing that, so I brought in this thought that he wanted to know whether Donald was a real brave duck, and that led to the bear, and the situation of testing Donald's courage. That's the way those stories build. I have a bunch of things that have to go into a story, and so I just keep feeling around for the best gags that fit in. It's like sewing together pieces of a shirt."

== Legacy ==
Following this first Scrooge story, Barks decided that he was an interesting character, and he wanted to develop him more. This led to the June 1948 story "The Old Castle's Secret", and all the Scrooge stories to come.

This story later inspired The Life and Times of Scrooge McDuck Part 12 by Don Rosa. In Rosa's story, which takes place on the day right after Christmas Eve, but before the dinner at Scrooge's mansion, Huey, Dewey, and Louie are first officially introduced to their Uncle Scrooge. Donald, however, makes references to a previous encounter between him and Scrooge. Rosa's story shows Scrooge being well known to everybody in Duckburg and it could be said Donald and the nephews hoped (with little to no enthusiasm) their stingy uncle to remember them. One detail in Rosa's story that does not fit in "Christmas on Bear Mountain" is Scrooge's appearance. However, this choice was intentionally made as Rosa wanted to maintain Scrooge's more well-known appearance.

== See also ==
- "Christmas on Bear Mountain" served as the title story to Fantagraphics' The Complete Carl Barks Disney Library Vol. 5 - Donald Duck: "Christmas on Bear Mountain"
- List of Disney comics by Carl Barks
