= North of the Yukon (Disney comics) =

- Story code: W US 59-01
- Story: Carl Barks
- Ink: Carl Barks
- Date: February 25, 1965
- Hero: Scrooge McDuck
- Pages: 24
- Layout: 4 rows per page
- Appearances: Scrooge McDuck; Donald Duck; Huey, Dewey and Louie; Soapy Slick; The Junior Woodchucks (Arctic Troop 626)
- First publication: Uncle Scrooge #59; September 1965

"North of the Yukon" is a 24-page Disney comics adventure story featuring Scrooge McDuck and his nephews, Donald Duck and Huey, Dewey and Louie. It was written and drawn by Carl Barks and first published in Uncle Scrooge #59 (September 1965). This was his last story involving Scrooge's adventures in Alaska. The character of Barko was inspired by an actual sled dog named Balto, who participated in the 1925 serum run to Nome. Barks had read an article about Balto in an issue of National Geographic and was inspired to create this character.

== Plot ==
The story starts with a photographer from Jolt magazine, wanting to do a picture story on Scrooge. Donald is partly to blame after he tries to convince Scrooge that if he does it, he will be paid fifty thousand dollars. Scrooge refuses, saying that if more people knew that he was the Richest Duck in the World, "every chisler from Cape Town to Nome would be waylaying me!" It's not until the photographer threatens to rip a five thousand dollar check in front of McDuck that he gives in. Scrooge even tells them how he made his first billion dollars in the Alaskan Gold Rush.

Soon after the magazine is published, Scrooge is shocked to see that they extended his story to "ten pages of hogwash" and even calling him "a bashful King Midas". Just as Scrooge had feared, people come up to him asking for money. Just as he thinks things cannot get any worse, an old enemy in Goldboom, Alaska sees the article. The fiend then comes up with a plot. Since Scrooge gave him an I.O.U. in 1898, the sum doubled every month for the last sixty-seven years! It isn't long until Scrooge gets a summons from the same fiend known as Soapy Slick. Scrooge remembers how Slick was a crooked moneylender who cared for nothing but money.

Scrooge doesn't worry, however; he tells Donald that he has the receipt in his files, proving that he paid Slick in full that same year. Donald asks Scrooge why Slick still has the note, seeing how he had paid him. Scrooge explains that he "claimed" to have lost it (as he usually told every other miner to collect the same debt twice). In a flashback, Scrooge and Slick have an argument about the loan. McDuck then demands: "Sign the receipt, or I'll slug you in your fat tank!". Slick mocks Scrooge saying that he couldn't hurt him with "those big, soft mittens". Fortunately for Scrooge, he kept his "big, soft mittens" filled with twenty pounds of gold nuggets. In doing so, McDuck got his receipt signed.

After looking through a mountain of papers, with the help of Donald and his grandnephews, Scrooge finds the receipt. His hopes of sneaking back into Goldboom unnoticed are foiled after news reporters get wind of the lawsuit. Meanwhile in Goldboom, Slick finds out about this, and boards the same bush plane that Scrooge takes.

While on the plane, Slick distracts the passengers by offering a game of "Klondike Scrabble" (he spills a bag of gold nuggets on the floor, and whoever finds the biggest nugget wins). Dewey sees Slick going for Scrooge's bag (with the receipt inside), and shouts a warning to his uncle. Scrooge leaps upon the would-be thief, and seeing that it's actually Slick in disguise, the two fight. During the brawl, the bag flies out the window. Scrooge's bag then lands near the Frozenjaw River. Scrooge tries to get the plane to land, but the pilot says "There'll be bad weather for a week." Slick mocks Scrooge, saying that he will soon own all of his money. Scrooge gets furious, saying, "You gloating crook! For my health's sake, I need to sock you!" Slick once again laughs at Scrooge, but is cut short after McDuck punches him with a mitten filled with the same nuggets Slick himself spilled on the floor.

Scrooge, after landing, contemplates that he can get a dogsled and get the receipt back in time for the trial. Donald tries to convince his uncle that the newsmen could help him, but Scrooge refuses, seeing that this was meant to be a race between Slick and himself, "with the only rules of the Arctic Law of Club and Fang." Arriving at a goods store that used to sell sled dogs, Scrooge is appalled to see that the owner only has one of only two dog teams in Goldboom (the one Scrooge looks at consists of Kyoodles) . The owner states that dog teams are hardly used anymore, to which Scrooge objects ("Yes, but in weather like this only dogs can take you where you have to go."). Upon saying this, an old sled dog pops out the snow.

The old dog's name is Barko. The owner explains that Barko was once the North's greatest champion, but now he's old and stricken with rheumatism. It's then revealed that the other dog team is Soapy Slick's champion racing team (as the owner tells Donald this, Slick and his team pass by). Scrooge remembers how Barko helped deliver serum to Nome (a reference to the 1925 serum run to Nome). Befriending the old duck quadzillionaire, Barko nips the other dogs into their positions. Scrooge tells his nephews to stay in town while he deals with Soapy. Despite this, Huey, Dewey and Louie try to follow, but cannot keep up with the team's speed.

Scrooge befriends the old sled-dog, Barko. Art by Carl Barks.

As Scrooge draws closer to Slick's team, Slick drugs a few frozen fish, and leaves them on the trail. McDuck sees the fish, and decides to let the team rest and eat. Suddenly, the dogs collapse from the sedative. When Scrooge discovers this, he passes out from the fumes. The sedative, however, has the opposite effect on Barko—for the first time in ages, his rheumatism didn't cause pain. The old sled dog then gathers his team and musher onto the sled, he pulls with all his might.

Desperate to help their uncle, the boys stop by an Inuit village to see the local Junior Woodchucks. Upon meeting the Arctic Patrol, the boys are given a lift by a troop who raised a polar bear cub as a sled dog named Poly Poly. Later that night, Scrooge awakens to see that Barko pulled them the whole time. Thankful of his new friend's help, Scrooge and the Kyoodles pull the rest of the way. Back at town, Donald is tricked by a newsreporter into telling him the whereabouts of the team.

By morning, Slick's team slows down upon the frozen river. Barko, once again back in his harness, runs like he did in his days of youth. The old sled dog bobs over the cracks of the ice with ease. Just as Scrooge and his team reach victory, Slick pulls out a pistol, and fires. The bullets separate the handles from Scrooge's sled, and he falls into the icy waters. Barko then rescues him before the current takes him under. As the sled sinks through the ice, Scrooge cuts the team free, and they make it for dry land. Scrooge makes it, but then realizes that Barko has been caught in the ice.

Scrooge rescues Barko. Art by Carl Barks.

Scrooge is then left with the choice of either getting his bag back or saving Barko. Scrooge dodges over the ice to save his friend instead of saving his fortune ("I can't let you drown, old boy! That would be welching on my debt to you!"). All seems lost as Scrooge and Barko are stranded on the cracks of ice, but then the boys and Poly Poly show up to save the day. Poly Poly swims with Scrooge and his sled dog back to land, but the celebration is cut short as Slick grabs the receipt. Before he can rip it and steal Scrooge's great fortune, news reporters show up, taking his photo for the court to see.

In the end, Soapy Slick is brought to the proper authorities, Scrooge gets to keep his fortune, and Barko the old sled dog and Poly Poly become famous animal heroes.

== Analysis ==
Don Rosa, who considered Carl Barks his greatest idol, did a cover for Uncle Scrooge #278, depicting a reenactment of the scene on the ice with Scrooge and Barko (the story was reprinted in this issue, as well). Rosa also referenced the events of "North of the Yukon" in Chapters 8 and 9 of his Life and Times of Scrooge McDuck anthology, but retconned the year of Scrooge taking up the loan to 1896 (since in 1898 he would be too late to be at the forefront of the gold rush).

== See also ==
- List of Disney comics by Carl Barks

== Sources ==
- The Barko Factor by Geoffrey Blum (retrieved December 8, 2006)
- Carl Barks: His Life and His Work (retrieved December 8, 2006)
- The COA Disney Comics Database (retrieved December 8, 2006)
