= The Legend of Amaluk =

- Directed by: James P. Connor
- Written by: Leo S. Rosencrans & Robert Rosencrans
- Produced by: Jerry Fairbanks
- Starring: Lorne Greene (narrator)
- Cinematography: Frank Whaler
- Edited by: William Lieb
- Release date: 1972
- Running time: 104 minutes
- Country: United States
- Language: English

The Legend of Amaluk (retitled North of the Yukon in Canada) is a 1972 adventure-drama film directed by James P. Connor and produced by Jerry Fairbanks. Filming took place over three years in Yukon and Alaska with Inuit actors before being narrated by Lorne Greene. The lead cinematographer was a retired Alaskan bush pilot named Frank Whaler.

The film "tells the story of a youth who undergoes a manhood test within the village to prove himself to elders and to win a bride." It features various elements of Inuit culture, including Nalukataq (blanket toss).
