= The Old Castle's Secret =

- Original cover by Carl Barks
- Story code: W OS 189-02
- Story: Carl Barks
- Ink: Carl Barks
- Date: December 3, 1947
- Hero: Donald Duck
- Pages: 32
- Layout: 4 rows per page
- Appearances: Donald Duck; Huey, Dewey, and Louie; Scrooge McDuck
- First publication: Four Color Comics #189; June 1948

"The Old Castle's Secret" is a 32-page Disney comics adventure/mystery/horror story written, drawn, and lettered by Carl Barks. It was first published by Dell Publishing in Four Color #189 (June 1948). Characters include Scrooge McDuck, Donald Duck, and his three nephews. The story is about a treasure hunt led by Uncle Scrooge through an old castle in Scotland.

This is the first of Uncle Scrooge's comic book treasure hunts, and the cover is Barks' first. The story has been reprinted many times.

== Plot ==
Scrooge McDuck, in his second appearance, recruits his nephews to search for a family treasure back in Dismal Downs, the old castle of Clan McDuck, built in the middle of a swamp in Scotland. The treasure once belonged to Sir Quackly McDuck, but both the treasure and its owner disappeared during the siege of 1057. The Clan has been searching for the treasure for centuries but Scrooge, the last McDuck, believes he can locate it thanks to an X-ray machine that can examine through the castle's walls.

Finding the treasure proves to be the easy part of the mission, but they have to face a mysterious ghost who steals the treasure from them and repeatedly tries to dispose of any pursuers. They can't see it but they can see its shadow, that of a skeleton. During this, Scottie, the caretaker of the castle, seems to have been murdered by Sir Quackly, while Scrooge, Donald, and the Nephews find themselves trapped in a locked battlement. The Nephews escape by swinging across into the surrounding moat, but can't get in. However, remembering the tale of Sir Swamphole McDuck who sealed the dungeons (due to the high cost of running a dungeon), they locate a secret passageway into the castle's dungeons through his fake grave site (his skeleton was inside his armor).

Scrooge and Donald remain on the battlement, until Scrooge reveals he has a gun which can shoot the lock and unlock the door. Scrooge, embarrassed, tells Donald to give him "a good, swift kick!". While in the dungeon, the Nephews find the treasure box, but are nearly attacked by the ghost and discover another way out of the dungeon; the pillar upon which Sir Swamphole's armor is resting is actually a door. Scrooge, Donald, and the nephews find an invisibility spray before giving chase to the ghost, now covered in mud and no longer invisible, through the swamp. The nephews and Donald tackle him to the ground and retrieve the treasure box. The ghost is revealed to be a thief who was impersonating Scottie (who had died of old age years before) using a special spray-like formula that made him invisible, but didn't prevent his skeleton from casting a shadow. Donald then takes all the nephews' credit, claiming they hadn't known the invisibility spray even existed. Enraged, the nephews then trick Donald into thinking the spray is a mosquito repellent, where they then make him completely invisible save for his tail and legs.

== Production ==
Uncle Scrooge had been introduced in "Christmas on Bear Mountain", published in December 1947; this story was the character's return. Asked in a 1962 interview if Barks had received favorable comments about Scrooge, Barks said, "Not a word, but I kind of liked old Scrooge and he filled a gap. We needed somebody to help Donald out." Wanting to use Scrooge again, Barks wrote this story to explain where the character came from.

== See also ==
- The Old Castle's Secret served as the title story to Fantagraphics The Complete Carl Barks Disney Library Vol. 6 - Donald Duck: "The Old Castle's Secret"
- List of Disney comics by Carl Barks
