= Sport Goofy in Soccermania =

- UK VHS cover art
- Based on: Donald's Nephews by; Carl Barks; Jack Hannah; Goofy by; Art Babbitt; Frank Webb
- Story by: Tad Stones; Michael Giaimo; Joe Ranft
- Directed by: Matthew O'Callaghan
- Starring: Tony Pope; Will Ryan; Russi Taylor; Jack Angel; Phil Proctor; Chick Hearn
- Music by: John Debney
- Country of origin: United States
- Original language: English

Production
- Running time: 20 minutes
- Production company: Walt Disney Feature Animation

Original release
- Network: NBC
- Release: May 27, 1987

Sport Goofy in Soccermania is an animated television special produced by Walt Disney Feature Animation for The Walt Disney Company. It originally aired May 27, 1987, on NBC. During its television debut it was preceded by a mockumentary showing past Goofy cartoons of him getting everything wrong, and leading into the cartoon special where the audience is finally shown a competent, athletic Goofy.

The special also marks the animated debut of some characters from the Donald Duck universe originating from the comics, including the Beagle Boys, Gyro Gearloose and Little Helper, although in the case of the last two having only a brief cameo appearance.

== Plot ==
Huey, Dewey, and Louie request Scrooge McDuck donate $1.49 to buy a championship trophy for their new soccer team, which Scrooge gasps is very expensive. Scrooge gives an old trophy of his he thinks is worthless, but the boys pass the curator of the Duckburg Museum, who appraises it as an artifact worth a million dollars. To win back the trophy, Scrooge is now made to sponsor his nephews. They buy a soccer ball from a sporting goods store owned by a surprisingly athletic and agile Goofy, who ends becoming the team's coach when the nephews' teammates are shown as ragtag misfits, but the "McDuck Greenbacks" come together under "Sport Goofy"'s patient coaching and sharpen their soccer skills.

Since the trophy's value makes front page news, the Beagle Boys are aware of it, and seek to enter the soccer tournament as well, but since they are out of shape and do not know anything about soccer, they resort to cheating. A series of sports news montages are shown how the soccer tournament has been progressing. When the Beagles see the Greenbacks won the semifinals, they think Goofy is a problem and kidnap him. The team is disheartened by the loss of their team captain, but resolve to go on without him. Despite the excellent playing by the team members, the Beagle Boys engage in their cheating and a nearsighted referee keeps declaring the Beagles' goals legit, ending the first half with a score of 10–0. Back at the hideout, Goofy is firmly tied to a chair although he attempts to cleverly escape. As one of the Beagle Boys' is watching TV, Goofy removes a sock and uses his bare foot to grab a knife. The knife almost slips but Goofy uses his toes to catch it - before alerting the goon. Goofy quietly escapes the Beagles' hideout and gets to the field for the second half, which encourages the Greenbacks into incredible playing that not even the Beagles' cheating can counter, causing a comeback of 10–10.

When the enraged Beagles resort to outright physically assaulting Goofy, Scrooge finally makes the referee wear his glasses, causing the referee to cry foul and set up a penalty shot. The field is cleared save for Goofy and the Beagles' goalie, but Goofy is still dizzy from the beating he is trying to regain his balance. The Beagles' captain secretly places a bomb in the ball, and orders a Beagle to push the red button on the detonator when Goofy is ready to take his shot. The Beagle is so uneducated that he keeps pushing the green button, causing Sport Goofy to easily make the penalty goal past an overconfident goalie, thus the Greenbacks win 11–10. All of Duckburg rejoices except for the Beagles, whose angry captain pushes the red button causing the ball to explode and send all the Beagle Boys into a waiting police van. Now that Scrooge has his trophy back, he donates it to the Duckburg Museum (after making sure it's tax-deductible), and joins the McDuck Greenbacks in their championship photo.

== Voice actors ==
- Tony Pope - Sport Goofy
- Will Ryan - Scrooge McDuck, Jeeves, Beagle Boy #2, and Gyro Gearloose
- Russi Taylor - Huey, Dewey, and Louie, Grandma Duck, and TV Chef
- Jack Angel - Beagle Boy #1
- Philip Proctor - Beagle Boy #3, and Museum Curator
- Chick Hearn - The Announcer

== Production ==
Sport Goofy In Soccermania was the first original Goofy cartoon produced since Freewayphobia and Goofy's Freeway Troubles in 1965. Production on the short was announced in 1985 by Ed Hanson, Vice President of Disney Animation, alongside the announcement of what would become The Prince and the Pauper.

Soccermania also marks the first time Russi Taylor voices Huey, Dewey, and Louie (taking over the role from Clarence Nash) and Grandma Duck (taking over the role from June Foray). Soccermania is one of the few Disney cartoons of the time where Uncle Scrooge wasn't voiced by Alan Young, but instead was voiced by Will Ryan.

Joe Ranft and Tad Stones wrote the story. Ranft went on to work for Pixar (and eventually returned to Disney when Pixar was contracted to do films for them), while Stones went on to work at Walt Disney Television Animation, which was concurrently in production on DuckTales, another pairing of Uncle Scrooge and his nephews. Sport Goofy In Soccermania was also the first piece of Disney animation upon which Kevin Lima, future director of A Goofy Movie, would work. During Goofy's dream sequence, moments of the 1946 short, Double Dribble, can be seen.
