= Back to the Klondike =

- Cover of Four Color #456 depicting a scene from "Back to the Klondike"
- Story code: W OS 456-02
- Story: Carl Barks
- Ink: Carl Barks
- Date: March 1953
- Hero: Scrooge McDuck
- Pages: 32 (originally shortened to 27)
- Layout: 4 rows per page
- Appearances: Scrooge McDuck; Donald Duck; Huey, Dewey and Louie; Goldie O'Gilt (debut)
- First publication: Four Color #456

"Back to the Klondike" is a Disney comic book story created by Carl Barks, created in September 1952 and first published in March 1953 in Four Color #456. Scrooge McDuck returns to Klondike where he has made his fortune, bringing Donald and the three nephews along, to find back the gold he has left there.

This story is a turning point in Barks' depiction of Scrooge: the first to show that the character has a softer side, and his miserly gruffness is partly a mask that he uses to guard against loneliness and loss.

== Plot ==
The Goose Egg Nugget, painting by Barks said to have been a personal favorite (c. 1973)

At the beginning of the story, Scrooge McDuck seems to be suffering from memory lapses to the point he cannot even recognize Donald. Donald drags him to a doctor and Scrooge is given some pills supposed to help recover his memory. As his memory returns, Scrooge suddenly starts planning to return to the Klondike, Yukon, the place of his youth where he earned his wealth. He tells Donald and his nephews, who accompany him, he has left a cargo of gold buried near his old hut. Scrooge also begins to make references to "Glittering Goldie", a person of his past.

As Scrooge seems to relive his past, but feeling his age, they arrive in Dawson, where Scrooge explains how he and Goldie met. Scrooge tells his nephews how Goldie stole his gold from him in the past, and how he kidnapped her and forced Goldie to work for him at his mining claim, up until the point where we see -in a flashback scène- Goldie shouting at Scrooge while crying for her ruined dress.

The journey continues till they reach his old lodge and to their surprise it's occupied. Also, the current occupant forcibly resists any of their attempts to approach. Finally the nephews manage to surprise and disarm the old lady behind the attack, Goldie herself. As Scrooge and Goldie meet again, both a rivalry and an attraction to each other seem to resurface. But Scrooge demands an old debt that Goldie cannot pay. She gives her last jewelry to Scrooge and just leaves, apparently quitting. But Scrooge calls her back and challenges her to a contest. A contest of who can find gold first.

Goldie succeeds in finding Scrooge's old cache that is now worth a fortune. After more than fifty years she succeeded. Scrooge leaves seemingly defeated and pretending that because he hadn't taken his pills, he had forgotten where the gold was. But behind his back, Donald reveals to his nephews that Scrooge had indeed taken the pills and practically offered this gold to Goldie. In the end, his nephews realize that Scrooge is more emotional than he would like to appear.

== Writing ==
Barks wrote the story after his second divorce, when he was traveling and living out of motels. In a Seattle bookshop, he found a copy of Klondike '98 by Ethel Anderson Becker, a book of photographs of the Klondike gold rush. He later wrote, "Reading this is how I got off on this wild beat of having Scrooge have the big fight in the saloon, kidnap this gal, and take her out to the hills and make her work out her debt."

== Publication history ==
In its first printing, the story was cut from 32 to 27 pages, since the editors did not believe the bar fight and abduction scenes were appropriate for a Disney comic. Barks later recalled, "I think they figured I should have had sense enough to know you couldn't get involved in fights in a barroom. It was quite a while afterwards before I found out why they cut it. I got a letter from the office, or was told on my next visit to the office, that I had violated a lot of their taboos and should have had sense enough to know it wouldn't work." Another of Western's concerns was that Scrooge kidnapped Goldie and made her work on his claim for a month, and that sequence was also cut from the published story.

Later, all cut art, except for a half page, was recovered and the story was published in its entirety in 1981 with the missing half page reconstructed by Barks.

In 2021, a lost unpublished panel of the half page from the story was found.

== DuckTales version ==
This was later adapted into an episode of the first season of DuckTales, with some alterations. Donald was removed; Webby and Mrs. Beakley were added; Scrooge suffers no memory lapses, as in the comic. He returns to Klondike because he suddenly remembers Goldie after seeing Beakly and Webby making Valentine's Day cards. Two villains are added that were not in Barks' story. Scrooge and Goldie are open about their romantic interest in one another, not only privately, but in front of Scrooge's nephews. The episode also introduces the Red Agony Creek which was never mentioned in Barks story (or by any other author - such as Rosa), making this land unique to the television series.

== See also ==
- List of Disney comics by Carl Barks
