= Scrooge McDuck =

Disney comics character

- Donald Duck and Mickey Mouse & Friends character
- First appearance: "Christmas on Bear Mountain" in Four Color #178 (December 1947)
- Created by: Carl Barks
- Designed by: Carl Barks
- Voiced by: Dallas McKennon (1960); Bill Thompson (1967); Alan Young (1974–2016); Will Ryan (Sport Goofy in Soccermania and 2-minute DuckTales pilot); John Kassir (2016–2022); David Tennant (DuckTales, Chibiverse, Chip 'n Dale Rescue Rangers; cameo); Eric Bauza (Legend of the Three Caballeros; cameo); Enn Reitel (2018–present); Alan Marriott (Disney Speedstorm)
- Developed by: Carl Barks; Don Rosa

In-universe information
- Aliases: Buck McDuck, Dagobert Duck (German and Dutch)
- Nickname: Uncle Scrooge
- Species: Duck
- Gender: Male
- Title(s): Richest Duck in the World "Champion Treasure hunter" Last of Clan McDuck
- Occupation: Business magnate "Adventure Capitalist"
- Family: Clan McDuck
- Significant others: Glittering Goldie (love interest); Brigitta MacBridge (self-proclaimed fiancée)
- Relatives: Donald Duck (nephew); Della Duck (niece); Gladstone Gander (brother-in-law's nephew); Huey, Dewey, and Louie (grandnephews)
- Origin: Glasgow, Scotland
- Nationality: Scottish

Scrooge McDuck (occasionally stylized as $crooge McDuck) is a cartoon character created in 1947 for The Walt Disney Company by Carl Barks. Appearing in Disney comics, Scrooge is a Scottish-born American anthropomorphic white duck. Like his nephew, Donald Duck, he has a yellow-orange bill, legs, and webbed feet. He typically wears a red or blue frock coat, a black top hat, pince-nez glasses, and spats varying in colour. He is portrayed in animation as speaking with a Scottish accent. Originally intended to be used only once, Scrooge became one of the most popular characters in the Disney comics world, as well as Barks' signature work. Scrooge is an extremely rich duck who lives in the fictional city of Duckburg (which is also Donald Duck and Huey, Dewey, and Louie's home city) in the fictional U.S. state of Calisota (a blend of California and Minnesota), whose claimed location is in real-world California, United States.

Named after the character Ebenezer Scrooge from Charles Dickens' 1843 holiday novella A Christmas Carol, Scrooge is a business magnate and "adventure-capitalist" whose dominant character traits are his wealth, frugality, and tendency to seek money through adventure and treasure hunting. Scrooge founded McDuck Enterprises. He is the maternal uncle of Donald Duck and Della Duck, the maternal great-uncle of Huey, Dewey, and Louie, a financial backer of inventor Gyro Gearloose, and the world's richest person within the context of the fictional Donald Duck universe. His business interests are diverse and all-inclusive. Both his "Money Bin" and Scrooge himself are often used as metonyms for wealth in popular culture around the world.

Barks has mentioned in interviews and correspondence that the character of Scrooge was inspired by Uncle Bim, the rich uncle from Sidney Smith’s The Gumps, as well as American industrialist John D. Rockefeller.. McDuck was initially characterized as a greedy miser and antihero (similar to Dickens' original Scrooge character). However, in later appearances, he has often been portrayed as a thrifty hero, adventurer, and explorer. He was originally created by Barks as an antagonist for Donald Duck, first appearing in the 1947 story "Christmas on Bear Mountain" (Four Color #178). However, McDuck's popularity grew so large that he became a major figure in the Donald Duck universe. In 1952, he received his own comic book series, called Uncle Scrooge, originally published from 1952–1984, and has had various revivals over the years (as have other Disney comic lines). The most recent revival, by IDW Publishing, ran from 2015 to 2020.

Scrooge was most famously drawn by his creator Carl Barks, and then later by Don Rosa. Like other Disney franchise characters, Scrooge McDuck has gained international popularity, resulting in literature that is often translated into other languages. The comics have remained Scrooge's primary medium, although he has also appeared in animated feature films and television programs, most extensively in the TV series DuckTales (1987–1990), and its reboot (2017–2021), as the main protagonist of both series.

== Comics history ==
=== First appearance ===
One of Scrooge's first panels in "Christmas on Bear Mountain"

Scrooge McDuck made his first named appearance in the story "Christmas on Bear Mountain"; it was published in Dell's Four Color Comics #178 on October 22, 1947, and written and drawn by artist Carl Barks. His appearance may have been based on a similar-looking Scottish "thrifty saver" Donald Duck character from the 1943 propaganda short The Spirit of '43.

In "Christmas on Bear Mountain", Scrooge was a bearded, bespectacled, reasonably wealthy old duck, visibly leaning on his cane and living in isolation in a "huge mansion". Scrooge's misanthropic thoughts in this first story are quite pronounced: "Here I sit in this big lonely dump, waiting for Christmas to pass! Bah! That silly season when everybody loves everybody else! A curse on it! Me—I'm different! Everybody hates me, and I hate everybody!"

Barks later reflected on the portrayal, saying "Scrooge in 'Christmas on Bear Mountain' was only my first idea of a rich, old uncle. I had made him too old and too weak. I discovered later on that I had to make him more active. I could not make an old guy like that do the things I wanted him to do."

=== Recurring character ===
Barks would later claim that he originally only intended to use Scrooge as a one-shot character, but then decided Scrooge (and his fortune) could prove useful for motivating further stories. Barks continued to experiment with Scrooge's appearance and personality over the next four years.

Scrooge's second appearance in "The Old Castle's Secret" (first published in June 1948) had him recruiting his nephews to search for a family treasure hidden in Dismal Downs, the McDuck's ancestral family castle built in the middle of Rannoch Moor in Scotland. "Foxy Relations" (first published in November 1948) was the first story where Scrooge is called by his title and catchphrase "The Richest Duck in the World".

A panel from an Uncle Scrooge comic by Jack Bradbury

=== First hints of Scrooge's past ===
The story "Voodoo Hoodoo", first published in Dell's Four Color Comics #238 in August 1949, was the first story to hint at Scrooge's past with the introduction of two figures. The first was Foola Zoola, an old African sorcerer and chief of the Voodoo tribe who cursed Scrooge, seeking revenge for the destruction of his village and the taking of his tribe's lands by Scrooge decades earlier.

Scrooge privately admitted to his nephews that he had used an army of "cutthroats" to get the tribe to abandon their lands, in order to establish a rubber plantation. The event was set in 1879 by Carl Barks, but it would later be retconned by Don Rosa to 1909 to better fit with Scrooge's later-established personal history in "The Empire-Builder from Calisota".

The second figure from Scrooge's past was Bombie the Zombie, the would-be assassin sent from Foola Zoola to enact the sorcerer's curse and revenge. He sought Scrooge for decades before reaching Duckburg, mistaking Donald for Scrooge.

Barks, with a note of skepticism often found in his stories, explained the zombie was a living person who has never died but has somehow gotten under the influence of a sorcerer. Although some scenes of the story were intended as a parody of Bela Lugosi's White Zombie, the story is the first to not only focus on Scrooge's past but also touch on the darkest aspects of his personality.

=== Later stories ===
"Trail of the Unicorn", first published in February 1950, introduced Scrooge's private zoo. One of his pilots had managed to photograph the last living unicorn, which lived in the Indian part of the Himalayas. Scrooge offered a reward to competing cousins Donald Duck and Gladstone Gander for whoever captured the unicorn for Scrooge's collection.

This was also the story that introduced Scrooge's private airplane. Barks would later establish Scrooge as an experienced aviator; Donald had previously been shown as a skilled aviator, as was Flintheart Glomgold in later stories. In comparison, Huey, Dewey, and Louie were depicted as only having taken flying lessons in the story "Frozen Gold" (published in January 1945).

"The Pixilated Parrot", first published in July 1950, introduced a precursor to Scrooge's money bin. In this story, Scrooge's central office building is said to contain "three cubic acres of money". Two burglars (one of which is referred to as Butch) who briefly appear during the story are considered to be the precursors of the Beagle Boys.

=== Scrooge as a major character ===
"The Magic Hourglass", first published in September 1950, was arguably the first story to change the focus of the Duck stories from Donald to Scrooge. During the story, several themes were introduced for Scrooge.

Donald first mentions in this story that his uncle practically owns Duckburg, a statement that Scrooge's rival John D. Rockerduck would later dispute. Scrooge first hints that he was not born into wealth as he remembers buying the Hourglass in Morocco when he was a member of a ship's crew as a cabin boy. It's also the first story in which Scrooge mentions reading and speaking other languages besides his native English; during the story, he reads and speaks Arabic.

Scrooge's proficiency in languages would become apparent in future stories. Barks and Rosa depicted Scrooge as being fluent in Arabic, Dutch, German, Mongolian, Spanish, Mayan, Bengali, Finnish, and a number of Chinese dialects. Scrooge acquired this knowledge from years of living or traveling to the various regions of the world where those languages are spoken. Later writers would depict Scrooge having at least a working knowledge of several other languages.

In "The Magic Hourglass," Scrooge is shown in a more positive light than in previous stories, but his more villainous side is still evident. He is seen attempting to reacquire a magic hourglass that he gave to Donald, before finding out that it acted as a protective charm for him. Scrooge starts losing one billion dollars each minute and comments that he will go bankrupt within 600 years. This line is a parody of Orson Welles's line in Citizen Kane, "You know, Mr. Thatcher, at the rate of a million dollars a year, I'll have to close this place in ... 60 years." To convince his nephews to return it, he pursues them throughout Morocco. Scrooge interrogates Donald by having him tied up and tickled with a feather in an attempt to get Donald to reveal the location of the hourglass. The former finally manages to retrieve it, exchanging the item for a flask of water, as he had found his nephews exhausted and left in the desert with no supplies. As Scrooge explains, he intended to give them a higher offer, but he just could not resist having somebody at his mercy without taking advantage of it.

=== Final developments ===
"A Financial Fable", first published in March 1951, had Scrooge teaching Donald some lessons in productivity as the source of wealth, along with the laws of supply and demand. Perhaps more importantly, it was also the first story where Scrooge observes how diligent and industrious Huey, Louie, and Dewey are, making them more similar to himself rather than to Donald. In Barks' stories, Donald is depicted as working hard on occasion, but given the choice often proves to be lazy. The three younger nephews first side with Scrooge rather than Donald in this story, with the bond between granduncle and grandnephews strengthening in later stories. However, there have been rare instances where Donald proved invaluable to Scrooge, such as when the group traveled back in time to Ancient Egypt to retrieve a pharaoh's papyrus. Donald cautions against taking it with him, as no one would believe the story unless it was unearthed. He then buries it and makes a marking point from the Nile River; Scrooge thinks to himself admiringly, "Donald must have swallowed the Encyclopædia Britannica!"

"Terror of the Beagle Boys", first published in November 1951, introduced the readers to the Beagle Boys. Although new to the series, Scrooge seems to be already familiar with them.

"The Big Bin on Killmotor Hill" introduced Scrooge's money bin, built on Killmotor Hill in the center of Duckburg. In the Ducktales 2017 reboot, the Money Bin is built on an island on Audubon Bay. The island is connected to a small bridge that leads to downtown Duckburg.

By this point, Scrooge had become familiar to readers in the United States and Europe. Other Disney writers and artists, including Italian writer Romano Scarpa, began using Scrooge in their own stories. Western Publishing, then the publisher of North American Disney comics, began thinking about using Scrooge as a protagonist rather than a supporting character, and then decided to launch Scrooge in his own self-titled comic. Uncle Scrooge #1, featuring the story "Only a Poor Old Man", was published in March 1952. This story, along with "Back to the Klondike", first published a year later in March 1953, became the biggest influences in how Scrooge's character, past, and beliefs would become defined.

After this point, Barks produced most of his longer stories in Uncle Scrooge, with a focus mainly on adventure, while his ten-page stories for Walt Disney's Comics and Stories continued to feature Donald as the star and focused on comedy. In Scrooge's stories, Donald and his nephews were cast as Scrooge's assistants who accompanied the latter in his adventures around the world. This change of focus from Donald to Scrooge was also reflected in stories by other contemporary writers. Since then, Scrooge remains a central figure of the Duck comics' universe, thus the coining of the term "Scrooge McDuck Universe".

=== Modern era ===
After Barks's retirement, the character continued under other artists. However, in 1972, Barks was persuaded to write more stories for Disney. He wrote Junior Woodchuck stories where Scrooge often plays the part of the villain, closer to the role he had before acquiring his own series. Under Barks, Scrooge always was a malleable character who would take on whatever persona was convenient to the plot.

The Italian writer and artist Romano Scarpa made several additions to Scrooge McDuck's lore, including characters such as Brigitta MacBridge, Scrooge's self-styled fiancée, and Gideon McDuck, a newspaper editor who is Scrooge's brother. Those characters have appeared mostly in European comics. This is also the case for Scrooge's rival John D. Rockerduck (created by Barks for just one story) and Donald's cousin Fethry Duck, who sometimes works as a reporter for Scrooge's newspaper.

Another major development was the arrival of writer and artist Don Rosa in 1986, with his story "The Son of the Sun"; it was released by Gladstone Publishing and nominated for a Harvey Award, one of the comics industry's highest honors. Rosa has said in interviews that he considers Scrooge to be his favorite Disney character. In his stories, Don Rosa treated Scrooge as a historical character whose Disney adventures had occurred in the fifties and sixties and ended (in his undepicted death) in 1967 when Barks retired. He considered only Barks's stories as canonical, and fleshed out his timeline and family tree based on Barks's stories. Eventually he wrote and drew The Life and Times of Scrooge McDuck, a full history in twelve chapters, which received an Eisner Award in 1995.

Later editions included additional chapters. Under Rosa, Scrooge became more ethical; while he never cheats, he ruthlessly exploits any loopholes. He owes his fortune to his hard work and his money bin is "full of souvenirs" since every coin reminds him of a specific circumstance.

Daan Jippes, who can mimic Barks's art to a close extent, repenciled all of Barks's 1970s Junior Woodchucks stories, as well as Barks's final Uncle Scrooge stories from the 1990s to the early 2000s. Other notable Disney artists who have worked with the Scrooge character include Michael Peraza, Marco Rota, William Van Horn, and Evert Geradts.

In an interview with the Norwegian "Aftenposten" from 1992, Don Rosa says that "in the beginning Scrooge [owed] his existence to his nephew Donald, but that has changed and today it's Donald that [owes] his existence to Scrooge," and he also says that this is one of the reasons why he is so interested in Scrooge.

In 2024, Marvel created an Uncle Scrooge story for the first time, titled "Uncle Scrooge and the Infinity Dime". It was written by Jason Aaron and other artists. The following year saw the publishing of a mini series Uncle Scrooge: "Earth's Mightiest Duck", also by Aaron. 2026 is to see the publishing of "Uncle Scrooge: a Christmas Carol", by Marvel's Louise Simonson.

== Characterization ==
=== Overview ===
Scrooge's signature dive into his money

The character is almost exclusively portrayed as having worked his way up the financial ladder from humble immigrant roots. His characteristics are believed to be strongly influenced by the life of a real, incredibly wealthy Scottish-American business magnate Andrew Carnegie, as well as Ebenezer Scrooge, his namesake from A Christmas Carol.

The comic book series The Life and Times of Scrooge McDuck, written and drawn by Don Rosa, shows Scrooge's fictional life. As a young boy, he takes up a job polishing and shining boots in his native Glasgow. A pivotal moment comes in 1877 when a ditch-digger pays him with an 1875 US dime, which is useless as currency in 19th century Glasgow; he only notices what sort of coin he has been given after the man has left, as his boots were so caked with dirt, Scrooge fainted from exhaustion after finishing his work. Enraged, Scrooge vows to never be taken advantage of again, to be "sharper than the sharpies, smarter than the smarties and tougher than the toughies". He takes a position as cabin boy on a Clyde cattle ship to the United States to make his fortune at the age of 13. In 1898, after many adventures, he finally ends up in Klondike, where he finds a golden rock the size of a goose egg. By the following year, he made his first $1 million and bought the deed for Killmule Hill from Casey Coot, the son of Clinton Coot and grandson of Cornelius Coot, the founder of Duckburg. He finally ends up in Duckburg in 1902. After some dramatic events, where he faces both the Beagle Boys and President Theodore Roosevelt and his Rough Riders at the same time, he tears down the rest of the old Fort Duckburg and builds his famous Money Bin at the site. The series also has Scrooge encounter several historical figures during his lifetime, such as U.S. President Roosevelt ("The Buckaroo of the Badlands", "The Invader of Fort Duckburg", and "The Sharpie of the Culebra Cut"), Annie Oakley, Buffalo Bill and Apache leader Geronimo ("The Vigilante of Pizen Bluff"), Czar Nicholas II of Russia ("The Empire-Builder from Calisota"), John Jacob Astor IV (idem) and philologist Elias Lönnrot ("The Quest for Kalevala").

In the years to follow, Scrooge travels all around the world to increase his fortune, while his family remains behind to manage the Money Bin. When Scrooge finally returns to Duckburg, he is the richest duck in the world, rivaled only by Flintheart Glomgold, John D. Rockerduck, and less prominently, the maharaja of the fictional country Howdoyoustan (play on Hindustan). His experiences, however, have changed him into a hostile miser, and his family leaves him in disgust. About twelve years later, he closes down his empire; he eventually returns to a public life five years later and restarts his business in the comic's final chapter.

He keeps the majority of his wealth in his massive Money Bin, an enormous cubic building adorned with a dollar sign, overlooking the city of Duckburg. In the short Scrooge McDuck and Money, he remarks to his nephews that this money is "just petty cash". In the Dutch and Italian version, he regularly forces Donald and his nephews to polish the coins one by one in order to pay off Donald's debts; Scrooge will not pay them much for this lengthy, tedious, hand-breaking work. As far as he is concerned, even 5 cents an hour is too much expenditure. He does not even keep any to his personal estate, stating "Money goes to the bin, not next of kin".

Scrooge works as a businessman and is portrayed as a tightwad. He has been depicted several times diving into and swimming in a pool of his money. His most famous prized possession is his Number One Dime. He is also the richest member of The Billionaires Club of Duckburg, a society of the most successful businessmen of the world that enables them to stay connected to each other. Glomgold and Rockerduck are also influential members of the “Club”.

=== Wealth ===
Valuation of Scrooge's assets in Barks' "The Second Richest Duck"

The sum of Scrooge's wealth is unclear. According to Barks' "The Second Richest Duck" as noted by a Time article, Scrooge is worth "one multiplujillion, nine obsquatumatillion, six hundred twenty-three dollars and sixty-two cents". The DuckTales episode "Liquid Assets", Fenton Crackshell (Scrooge's accountant) notes that McDuck's money bin contains "607 tillion 386 zillion 947 trillion 522 billion dollars and 36 cents". Don Rosa's Life and Times of Scrooge McDuck notes that Scrooge amounts to "five multiplujillion, nine impossibidillion, seven fantastica trillion dollars and sixteen cents". A thought bubble from Scrooge McDuck sitting in his car with his chauffeur in Walt Disney's Christmas Parade No. 1 (published in 1949) that takes place in the story "Letter to Santa" clearly states "What's the use of having 'eleven octillion dollars' if I don't make a big noise about it?". In the episode "Duck in the Iron Mask" of the animated series DuckTales, Scrooge claims to have $72 quadrillion. In DuckTales the Movie: Treasure of the Lost Lamp, he mentions "We quadzillionaires have our own ideas of fun." In the first episode of the DuckTales reboot, Scrooge states that he runs "a multi-trillion-dollar business".

Forbes magazine has occasionally tried to estimate Scrooge's wealth in real terms. In 2007, the magazine estimated his wealth at $28.8 billion. By 2011, it rose to $44.1 billion due to the rise in gold prices. In a 1970 comic, Scrooge says that he would be broke in 600 years if he lost $1 billion a minute, putting his total estimated net worth at $315.36 quadrillion. A running gag is Scrooge always making profit on any business deal. Whatever the amount, Scrooge never considers it to be enough; he believes that he has to continue to earn money by any means possible. Additionally, Forbes does have him ranked at the number 1 spot on The Forbes Fictional 15.

=== Education ===
In one Barks story, Scrooge mentions having played football in college, ‘Webfoot Tech’.. However, other Barks stories such as “The Golden River”, imply that Scrooge already worked for a living during his boyhood, and therefore presumably never having a formal education. Scrooge is portrayed as having a sharp mind and is always ready to learn new skills. Because of his secondary occupation as a treasure hunter, Scrooge has become something of a scholar and an amateur archaeologist. Starting with Barks, several writers have explained how Scrooge becomes aware of the treasures he decides to pursue. This often involves periods of research consulting various written sources in search of passages that might lead him to treasure. Often Scrooge decides to search for the possible truth behind old legends, or discovers obscure references to the activities of ancient conquerors, explorers, and military leaders that he considers interesting enough to begin a new expedition.

As a result of his research, Scrooge has built up an extensive personal library, which includes many rare tomes. In the McDuck Archives, every work of McDuck's expeditions studied by scholars such as Ms. Quackfaster. In Barks's and Rosa's stories, among the prized pieces of this library is an almost complete collection of Spanish and Dutch naval logs of the 16th and 17th centuries. Their references to the fates of other ships have often allowed Scrooge to locate sunken vessels and recover their treasures. Self-taught, Scrooge is a believer in the saying "knowledge is power". Scrooge is also an accomplished linguist and entrepreneur, having learned to speak several different languages during his business trips around the world, such as selling refrigerators to Eskimos and wind to windmill manufacturers in the Netherlands.

=== Morality and beliefs ===
Both as a businessman and as a treasure hunter, Scrooge is noted for his drive to set new goals and face new challenges. As Carl Barks described his character, for Scrooge there is "always another rainbow". The phrase later provided the title for one of Barks's better-known paintings depicting Scrooge. Periods of inactivity between adventures and lack of serious challenges tend to be depressing for Scrooge after a while; some stories see these phases take a toll on his health. Scrooge's other motto is "Work smarter, not harder."

As a businessman, Scrooge often resorts to aggressive tactics and deception. He seems to have gained significant experience in manipulating people and events towards his own ends. As often seen in stories by writer Guido Martina and occasionally by others, Scrooge is noted for his cynicism, especially towards ideals of morality when it comes to business and the pursuit of set goals. This has been noted by some as not being part of Barks's original profile of the character, but has since come to be accepted as one valid interpretation of Scrooge's way of thinking.

Scrooge seems to have a personal code of honesty that offers him an amount of self-control. He can often be seen contemplating the next course of action, divided between adopting a ruthless pursuit of his current goal against those tactics he considers more honest. At times, he can sacrifice his goal in order to remain within the limits of this sense of honesty. Several fans of the character have come to consider these depictions as adding to the depth of his personality, because based on the decisions he takes Scrooge can be both the hero and the villain of his stories. This is one thing he has in common with his nephew Donald. Scrooge's sense of honesty also distinguishes him from his rival Flintheart Glomgold, who places no such self-limitations. During the cartoon series DuckTales, at times he would be heard saying to Glomgold, "You're a cheater, and cheaters never prosper!"

Like his nephew Donald, Scrooge has also a temper and rarely hesitates to use cartoon violence against those who provoke his ire (often his nephew Donald, but also bill and tax collectors as well as door-to-door salesmen). However, he seems to be against the use of lethal force. On occasion, he has even saved the lives of enemies who had threatened his own life but were in danger of losing their own. According to Scrooge's own explanation, this is to save himself from feelings of guilt over their deaths; he generally awaits no gratitude from them. Scrooge has also opined that only in fairy tales do bad people turn good, and that he is old enough to not believe in fairy tales. Scrooge believes in keeping his word—never breaking a promise once given. In Italian-produced stories of the 1950s to 1970s, however, particularly those written by Guido Martina, Scrooge often acts differently from in American or Danish comics productions.

Carl Barks gave Scrooge a definite set of ethics which were in tone with the time he was supposed to have made his fortune. The robber barons and industrialists of the 1890–1920s era were McDuck's competition as he earned his fortune. Scrooge proudly asserts "I made it by being tougher than the toughies and smarter than the smarties! And I made it square!". Barks's creation is averse to dishonesty in the pursuit of wealth. When Disney filmmakers first contemplated a Scrooge feature cartoon in the fifties, the animators had no understanding of the Scrooge McDuck character and merely envisioned Scrooge as a duck version of Ebenezer Scrooge—a very unsympathetic character. In the end, they shelved the idea because a duck who gets all excited about money just was not funny enough.

In an interview, Barks summed up his beliefs about Scrooge and capitalism:

I've always looked at the ducks as caricatured human beings. In rereading the stories, I realized that I had gotten kind of deep in some of them: there was philosophy in there that I hadn't realized I was putting in. It was an added feature that went along with the stories. I think a lot of the philosophy in my stories is conservative—conservative in the sense that I feel our civilization peaked around 1910. Since then we've been going downhill. Much of the older culture had basic qualities that the new stuff we keep hatching can never match.

Look at the magnificent cathedrals and palaces that were built. Nobody can build that sort of thing nowadays. Also, I believe that we should preserve many old ideals and methods of working: honor, honesty, allowing other people to believe in their own ideas, not trying to force everyone into one form. The thing I have against the present political system is that it tries to make everybody exactly alike. We should have a million different patterns.

They say that wealthy people like the Vanderbilts and Rockefellers are sinful because they accumulated fortunes by exploiting the poor. I feel that everybody should be able to rise as high as they can or want to, provided they don't kill anybody or actually oppress other people on the way up. A little exploitation is something you come by in nature. We see it in the pecking order of animals—everybody has to be exploited or to exploit someone else to a certain extent. I don't resent those things.

=== DuckTales ===
In the DuckTales series, Scrooge has care of the nephews (as Donald has joined the US Navy and is away on his tour of duty), and, as a result, his darker personality traits are downplayed. While most of his persona remain from the comics, he is notably more optimistic and level-headed in the animated cartoon. In an early episode, Scrooge credits his improved temperament to the nephews and Webby (his housekeeper's granddaughter, who comes to live in Scrooge's mansion), saying that "for the first time since I left Scotland, I have a family". Though Scrooge is far from tyrannical in the comics, he is rarely so openly affectionate. While he still hunts for treasure in DuckTales, many episodes focus on his attempts to thwart villains. However, he remains just as tightfisted with money as he has always been. But he's also affable and patient with his family and friends.

Scrooge displays a strict code of honor, insisting that the only valid way to acquire wealth is to "earn it square," and he goes to great lengths to thwart those (sometimes even his own nephews) who gain money dishonestly. This code also prevents him from ever being dishonest himself, and he avows that "Scrooge McDuck's word is as good as gold." He also expresses great disgust at being viewed by others as a greedy liar and cheater.

The series fleshes out Scrooge's upbringing by depicting his life as an individual who worked hard his entire life to earn his immense fortune and to fiercely defend it against those who were truly dishonest but also, he defends his family and friends from any dangers, including villains. His value teaches his nephews not to be dishonest with him or anybody else. It's shown that money is no longer the most important thing in his life. For one episode, he was under a love spell, which caused him to lavish his time on a goddess over everything else. The nephews find out that the only way to break the spell is to make the person realize that the object of their love will cost them something they truly love. The boys make it appear that Scrooge's love is allergic to money; however, he simply decides to give up his wealth so he can be with her. Later, when he realizes he will have to give up his nephews to be with her, the spell is immediately broken, showing that family is the most important thing to him.

On occasion, he demonstrates considerable physical strength by arm wrestling and beating bigger criminals on Aquatraz. He credits his strength to "lifting money bags."

=== Voice ===
Another part of Scrooge's persona is his Scottish accent. Dallas McKennon was the first actor to provide Scrooge's voice for the 1960 Disneyland Records album, Donald Duck and His Friends.

When Scrooge later made his speaking animated debut in Scrooge McDuck and Money in 1967, he was voiced by Bill Thompson. Thompson had previously voiced Jock the Scottish Terrier in Lady and the Tramp and according to Alan Young, Thompson had some Scottish ancestry. Following Scrooge McDuck and Money's release, Scrooge made no further animated appearances prior to Thompson's death in 1971.

In 1974, Disneyland Records produced the album, An Adaptation of Dickens' Christmas Carol, Performed by The Walt Disney Players. Alan Young belonged to a Dickens Society and was asked to help adapt the story to fit in Disney characters. Young, whose parents were Scottish and who lived in Scotland for a few years when he was an infant, voiced Scrooge for this record in addition to voicing Mickey Mouse and Merlin from The Sword in the Stone. When Disney decided to adapt the record into the 1983 theatrical short, Mickey's Christmas Carol, Young returned to voice Scrooge. In 1985 the obscure TV special A Magic Kingdom Yuletide Special had Disneyland announcer Jack Wagner provide the voice for a host of costumed meet and greet Disney characters from the parks, including Scrooge. Will Ryan, himself a fan of Barks’ comics, then voiced Scrooge for the 1987 television special, Sport Goofy in Soccermania. Ryan returned to voice Scrooge in the short pilot for DuckTales, but ultimately lost the part to Alan Young again, who from then on remained as Disney's official voice up until his death in 2016. Young's last performance as Scrooge was in the 2016 Mickey Mouse short, "No".

Since Young's death, several actors have provided Scrooge's voice. John Kassir took over for the Mickey Mouse shorts starting with "Duck the Halls" in 2016 and its follow-up series The Wonderful World of Mickey Mouse. Eric Bauza voiced Scrooge for a very brief cameo in the television series, Legend of the Three Caballeros. Scottish actor Enn Reitel voiced Scrooge for the English dub of Kingdom Hearts III, the 2022 life simulator game Disney Dreamlight Valley, and for the Disney Parks.

Scottish actor David Tennant voices Scrooge in the 2017 reboot of DuckTales, and reprised the role in Chip 'n Dale: Rescue Rangers and Chibiverse. According to executive producer Matt Youngberg:

David Tennant seemed to be the natural choice for this. We really wanted to find somebody who was legitimately Scottish. We thought that was really important in this iteration, someone who had the character to bring this icon alive. And David is an amazing actor. He's morphed into this role in an incredible way.

=== Europe ===
Many of the European comics based on the Disney Universe have created their own version of Scrooge McDuck, usually involving him in slapstick adventures. This is particularly true of the Italian comics which were very popular in the 1960s–1990s in most parts of Western continental Europe. In these, Scrooge is mainly an anti-hero dragging his long-suffering nephews into treasure hunts and shady business deals. Donald is a reluctant participant in these travels, only agreeing to go along when his uncle reminds him of the debts and back-rent Donald owes him, threatens him with a sword or blunderbuss, or offers a share of the loot. When he promises Donald a share of the treasure, Scrooge will add a little loophole in the terms which may seem obscure at first but which he brings up at the end of the adventure to deny Donald his share, keeping the whole for himself. After Donald risks life and limb – something which Scrooge shows little concern for – he tends to end up with nothing.

Another running joke is Scrooge reminiscing about his adventures while gold prospecting in the Klondike much to Donald and the nephews' annoyance at hearing the tiresome stories.

=== Age ===
According to Carl Barks' 1955 one-pager "Watt an Occasion" (Uncle Scrooge #12), Scrooge is 75 years of age. According to Don Rosa, Scrooge was born in Scotland in 1867, and earned his Number One Dime (or First Coin) on his tenth birthday. The DuckTales episodes (and many European comics) show a Scrooge who hailed from Scotland in the 19th century, yet was clearly familiar with all the technology and amenities of the 1980s. Despite this extremely advanced age, Scrooge does not appear to be on the verge of dotage, and is vigorous enough to keep up with his nephews in adventures. With rare exceptions, there appears to be no sign of him slowing down.

In Barks’ "That's No Fable!", Scrooge drinks water from the Fountain of Youth and, rather than making him young again (bodily contact with the water was required for that), ingesting the water enerergizes him and cures him of his rheumatism. Don Rosa's solution to the issue of Scrooge's age is that he set all of his stories in the 1950s or earlier, which was when he himself discovered and reveled in Barks' stories as a kid, and in his unofficial timelines, he had Scrooge die in 1967, at the age of 100 years.

In DuckTales (2017), Scrooge was trapped in ice for five years and "stuck in a timeless demon dimension" called Demogorgana for an unknown amount of time, which is used to explain his longevity. In the episode "The Other Bin of Scrooge McDuck!", Webby Vanderquack's research on Scrooge reveals that he was born in 1867, as previously established by Rosa. This would make Scrooge 154 years old as of 2021, the year that series ended.

== In popular culture ==
=== Cultural impact ===
Forbes magazine routinely lists Scrooge McDuck on its annual "Fictional 15" list of the richest fictional characters by net worth:

- 2002: #4 with $8.2 billion
- 2005: #6 with $8.2 billion
- 2006: #3 with $10.9 billion
- 2007: #1 with $28.8 billion (£17.6 billion)
- 2008: #2 with $29.1 billion
- 2010: #2 with $33.5 billion
- 2011: #1 with $44.1 billion
- 2013: #1 with $65.4 billion

In 1972, Grupo Ronda S.A acquired the license to use the character among other Disney characters for their board game Tío Rico Mc. Pato. As of today, it is one of the most popular board games in Colombia and the direct competitor of Monopoly in the region.

In tribute to its famous native, Glasgow City Council added Scrooge to its list of "Famous Glaswegians" in 2007, alongside the likes of Billy Connolly and Charles Rennie Mackintosh.

In 2008 The Weekly Standard parodied the bailout of the financial markets by publishing a memo where Scrooge applies to the TARP program.

An extortionist named Arno Funke targeted German department store chain Karstadt from 1992 until his capture in 1994, under the alias "Dagobert", the German (first) name for Scrooge McDuck.

In the Family Guy episode "Lottery Fever", Peter injures himself trying to dive into a pile of coins like Scrooge McDuck.

In the 2013 episode of Breaking Bad, "Buried", Saul Goodman associate Patrick Kuby remarks to fellow associate Huell Babineaux "we are here to do a job, not channel Scrooge McDuck" when Huell lies down on Walter White's pile of cash stored in a storage facility locker.

In the Clarence episode "Clarence's Millions", Clarence dreams that he swims in money like Scrooge McDuck only on a pile of bills instead of coins until a money monster chases him.

Dagobertducktaks ("Dagobert Duck" is the Dutch name for Scrooge McDuck), a tax for the wealthy, was elected Dutch word of the year 2014 in a poll by Van Dale.

In August 2017, the YouTube channel Film Theory, hosted by Matthew "MatPat" Patrick, estimated the worth of the gold coins in the money bin of Scrooge McDuck based on four sources, with the lowest source equaling $52,348,493,767.50 and the highest source ("three cubic acres") equaling $333,927,633,863,527.10 of gold value.

=== Scrooge McDuck Universe ===
The popularity of Scrooge McDuck comics spawned an entire mythology around the character, including new supporting characters, adventures, and life experiences as told by numerous authors. The popularity of the Duck universe – the fandom term for the associated intellectual properties that have developed from Scrooge's stories over the years, including the city of Duckburg – has led Don Rosa to claim that "in the beginning Scrooge [owed] his existence to his nephew Donald, but that has changed and today it's Donald that [owes] his existence to Scrooge."

In addition to the many original and existing characters in stories about Scrooge McDuck, authors have frequently led historical figures to meet Scrooge over the course of his life. Most notably, Scrooge has met US president Theodore Roosevelt. Roosevelt and Scrooge would meet each other at least three times: in the Dakotas in 1883, in Duckburg in 1902, and in Panama in 1906. See Historical Figures in Scrooge McDuck stories.

In 2014, composer Tuomas Holopainen of Nightwish released a conceptual album based on the book, The Life and Times of Scrooge McDuck. The album is titled Music Inspired by the Life and Times of Scrooge. Don Rosa illustrated the cover artwork for the album.

=== In animation and records ===
An earlier film prototype of Scrooge was featured in the animated short, The Spirit of '43.

Scrooge's voice was first heard on the 1960 record album Donald Duck and His Friends; Dal McKennon voiced the character for this appearance. It took the form of a short dramatization called "Uncle Scrooge's Rocket to the Moon", a story of how Scrooge builds a rocket to send all his money to the moon to protect it from the Beagle Boys. In 1961 this story was reissued as a 45 rpm single record entitled "Donald Duck and Uncle Scrooge's Money Rocket."

With Scrooge’s success in his own comic books in the 1950s, the Disney Studios soon had plans to introduce the character to theater audiences as well. Initially, Scrooge was to make his animated debut in a spin-off of the Donald Duck theatrical cartoons. As early as 1953, a Scrooge cartoon titled simply Scrooge McDuck was in development under Al Bertino and David Detiege. In it, Scrooge trades an unwitting Huey, Dewey and Louie a nickel for their valuable antique penny. When the kids learn they have been taken, they team up with Donald to get the penny back by any means necessary. However, as Scrooge was deemed too greedy by higher-ups, the cartoon was ultimately cancelled. Efforts to introduce Scrooge into animation continued through several other attempts; by 1958, a new Scrooge McDuck cartoon story by Nick George was in development at the Studios, Which had Scrooge trying to teach Donald thrift, saying “spare and save is better than to spend and crave!”. Production on this cartoon was ultimately shelved as well.

Late in 1954, Carl Barks was approached by the Disney Studios with the question if he would be free to write a script for a Scrooge McDuck 7-minute animated cartoon. Barks supplied the studios with a detailed 9-page script, telling the story of the happy-go-lucky Donald Duck working for the troubled Scrooge who tries to save his money from a hungry rat. Barks also sent number of sketches of his ideas for the short, including a money-sorting machine, which Barks had already used on the cover of one of the Uncle Scrooge issues. The script was never used as Disney soon after decided to concentrate on TV shows instead.

Several plans also existed to introduce Scrooge in the Disneyland TV series n the 1950s, but none of the proposed episodes ultimately ended being produced. Al Bertino and Dave Detiege’s pitched episode “Around the World with Donald Duck” would have included a trip to Scrooge’s Castle McDuck in Scotland. Efforts to involve Scrooge continued with the proposed episode “Donald’s Uncle Scrooge”, pitched by Bertino in 1957, which would have had Scrooge guest-hosting a full episode, with Walt Disney introducing Scrooge as “one of our biggest shareholders”. The episode would have had Scrooge introducing and narrating a series of past Donald Duck cartoons, including “The New Neighbor”, with Scrooge featured as the owner of the properties that Donald and Pete’s feud destroyed.

Scrooge's first appearance in animated form (save for a brief Mickey Mouse Club television series cameo) ultimately came in Disney's 1967 theatrical short Scrooge McDuck and Money (voiced by Bill Thompson), in which he teaches his nephews basic financial tips.

In 1974, Disneyland Records released an adaptation of the Charles Dickens' A Christmas Carol. Eight years later, Walt Disney Pictures produced a featurette of this same story, this time dubbed Mickey's Christmas Carol (1983). He also appeared as himself in the television special Sport Goofy in Soccermania (1987).

Scrooge's biggest role outside comics would come in the 1987 animated series DuckTales, a series loosely based on Carl Barks's comics, and where Alan Young returned to voice him. In this series, premiered over two hours on September 18, 1987, while the regular episodes began three days later, Scrooge becomes the legal guardian of Huey, Dewey and Louie when Donald joins the United States Navy. Scrooge's DuckTales persona is considerably mellow compared to most previous appearances; his aggression is played down, and his often duplicitous personality is reduced in many episodes to that of a curmudgeonly but well-meaning old uncle. Still, there are flashes of Barks' Scrooge to be seen, particularly in early episodes of the first season. Scrooge also appeared in DuckTales the Movie: Treasure of the Lost Lamp, released during the series' run. He was mentioned in the Darkwing Duck episode "Tiff of the Titans", but never really seen, apart from on a billboard in Duckburg, in the aforementioned episode. A new version of DuckTales premiered in 2017, still focused on Scrooge, now voiced by David Tennant, and the triplets.

He has appeared in one episode of Raw Toonage, two shorts of Mickey Mouse Works and some episodes (especially "House of Scrooge") of House of Mouse, as well as the direct-to-video films Mickey's Once Upon a Christmas and Mickey's Twice Upon a Christmas.

In 2015, Scrooge was seen in the Mickey Mouse short "Goofy's First Love", where Mickey and Donald are trying to help Goofy find his love. In the 2016 Mickey Mouse Christmas special, "Duck the Halls", after Young's death, John Kassir took over voicing Scrooge McDuck, however he later tweeted that he would not be reprising his role in the reboot. Kassir continues to voice the character in subsequent appearances in this series. Scrooge makes a brief cameo appearance in the Legend of the Three Caballeros episode "Shangri-La-Di-Da".

Scrooge also has a cameo appearance with his outfit from Mickey's Christmas Carol in the 2023 short film Once Upon a Studio.

=== In other media ===
Scrooge’s video game appearances include the three DuckTales releases (DuckTales, DuckTales 2, and DuckTales: The Quest for Gold), and in Toontown Online as the accidental creator of the Cogs. Additionally, he is a secret playable character in 2008 quiz game, Disney TH!NK Fast. In the 2012 Nintendo 3DS game Epic Mickey: Power of Illusion, he is one of the first characters Mickey rescues, running a shop in the fortress selling upgrades and serving as a Sketch summon in which he uses his cane pogostick from the DuckTales NES games.

Scrooge also makes sporadic appearances in Disney's and Square Enix's Kingdom Hearts series, helping Mickey Mouse establish a world transit system to expand his business empire to other worlds. He first appears in Kingdom Hearts II as a minor non-playable character in Hollow Bastion, where he is trying to recreate his favorite ice cream flavor – sea-salt. Scrooge later appears in the prequel Kingdom Hearts: Birth by Sleep, this time with a speaking role. He works on establishing an ice-cream business in Radiant Garden and gives Ventus three passes to the Dream Festival in Disney Town. Scrooge returns in Kingdom Hearts III, now managing a bistro in Twilight Town with the help of Remy from Ratatouille. Alan Young reprises the role in the English version of Birth by Sleep, while Enn Reitel voices the character in III.

Scrooge has appeared in the Boom! Studios Darkwing Duck comic, playing a key role at the end of its initial story, "The Duck Knight Returns". Later he would also play a key role on the final story arc "Dangerous Currency", where he teams up with Darkwing Duck in order to stop the Phantom Blot and Magica De Spell from taking over St. Canard and Duckburg.

== See also ==
=== Comics ===
- Clan McDuck and the Duck family
- Uncle Scrooge (comic book) / Disney comics
- Carl Barks – foundational comics artist/writer; created Scrooge
- Don Rosa – popular comics artist/writer of the following generation
- The Life and Times of Scrooge McDuck, by Don Rosa
- Music Inspired by the Life and Times of Scrooge
- Inducks – Disney comics database / Donaldism – Disney comics fandom

=== Animation ===
- Scrooge McDuck and Money (1967) – Theatrical film
- Mickey's Christmas Carol (1983) – Theatrical film
- Sport Goofy in Soccermania (1987) – TV special
- DuckTales (1987) – TV series
- DuckTales the Movie: Treasure of the Lost Lamp (1990) – Theatrical film
- Mickey's Twice Upon a Christmas (2004) – Direct-to-video film
- DuckTales (2017) – TV series
