= Clan McDuck =

Disney comics characters

Glasgow 1877, Clan McDuck portrait by Don Rosa; left to right: Jake, Matilda, Downy, Fergus, Hortense, Scrooge (age 10), and Angus; wall portraits: Malcolm, Eider, Quackly, Roast, and Hugh (Clicking on a character will take you to their section.)

The Clan McDuck is a fictional Scottish clan of cartoon ducks from which Disney character Scrooge McDuck is descended. Within the Donald Duck universe, the clan is related to the American Duck family through the marriage of Hortense McDuck and Quackmore Duck, Donald and Della Duck's parents, giving both of them partial Scottish ancestry.

Clan McDuck was created by American comic book author Carl Barks, who also created the character of Scrooge McDuck. Barks' 1948 story "The Old Castle's Secret," in which Scrooge and his nephews search for hidden treasure in McDuck Castle, introduced the backstory of the clan. Other authors built on Barks' work, most notably Don Rosa in his 12-part comic saga The Life and Times of Scrooge McDuck (1992–94) which introduced Scrooge's immediate family.

== Literary origins ==
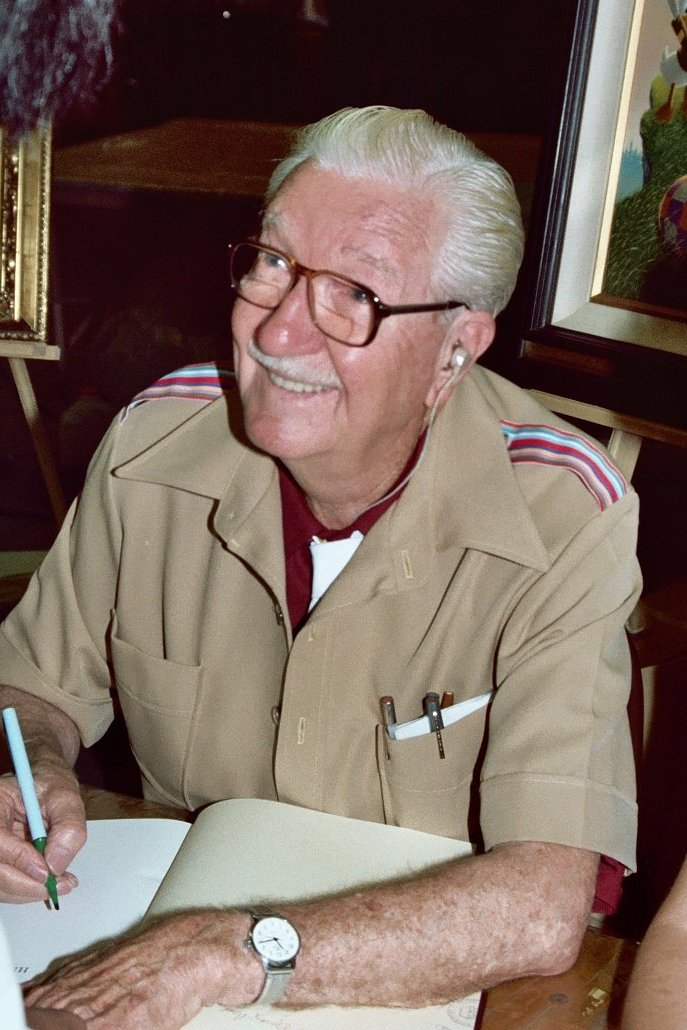
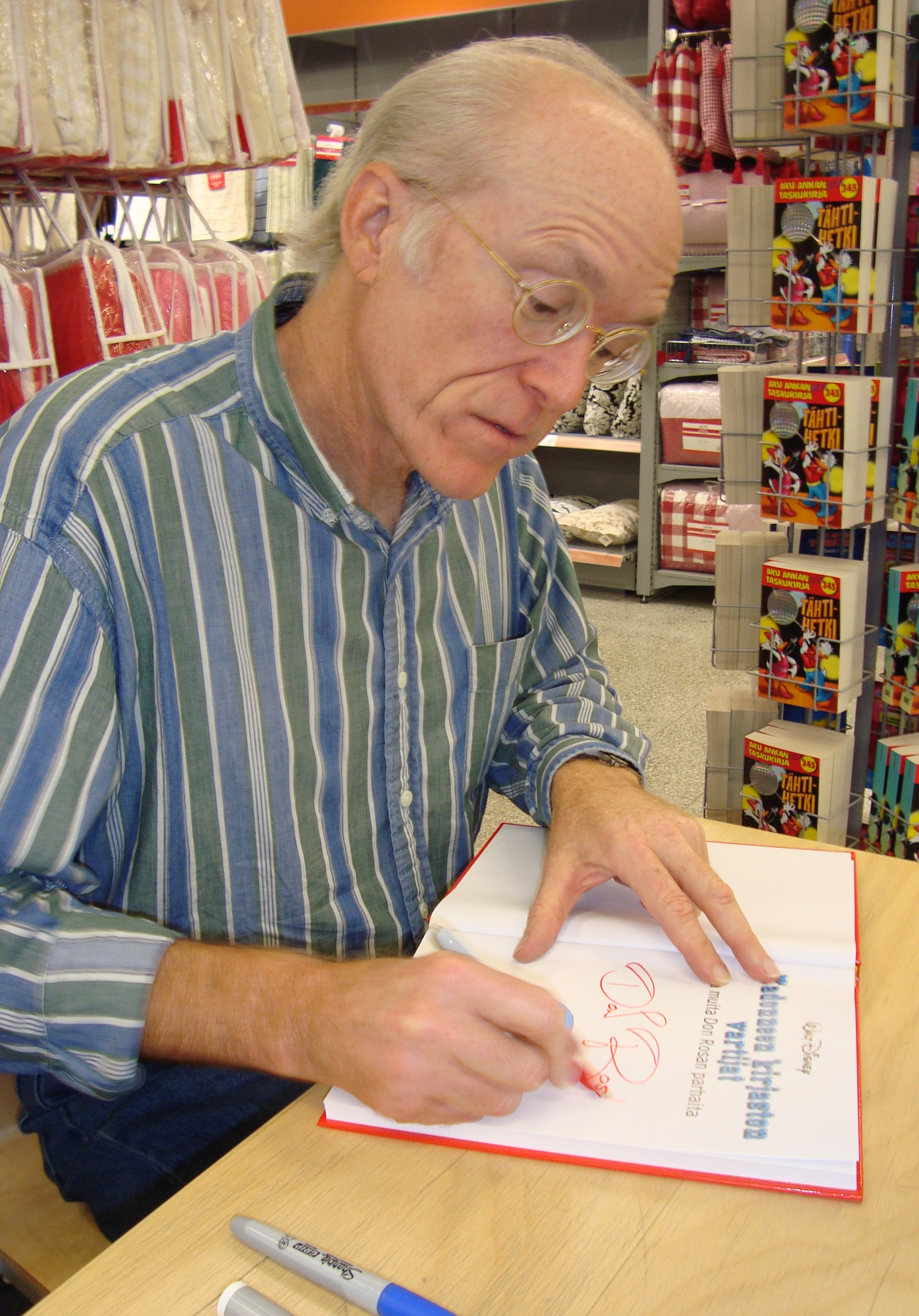
Carl Barks (left) and Don Rosa (right)

In the early 1950s, Carl Barks was in his second decade of creating comic book stories starring Donald Duck and his various relatives. He had personally created several of the latter, including cousin Gladstone Gander and uncle Scrooge McDuck, although the specific relationships between them were still uncertain. To better define these relationships, Barks created a version of the McDuck/Duck/Coot family tree for his own personal benefit, incidentally creating several additional characters.

During his retirement, Barks' stories remained popular and gained him unexpected fame. Barks gave several interviews during which he answered questions about his stories and the characters he had created. In 1981, Barks described his personal version of Donald's family tree, which was used by amateur artist Mark Worden in drawing the family tree and including portraits of the characters mentioned. Worden's tree was first published in several fanzines, and later in the Disney-licensed Carl Barks Library, a ten-volume hardcover collection of Barks' stories in black-and-white.

In 1987, Don Rosa, a long-time fan of Carl Barks and a personal friend of Mark Worden, started creating his own stories featuring Scrooge McDuck. His stories contained numerous references to older stories by Barks as well as several original ideas. After several years he gained a fan base of his own. In the early 1990s, the Egmont Group, the publishing house employing Rosa, offered him an ambitious assignment: he was to create the definitive version of Scrooge's biography and a family tree to accompany it. The project was intended to end decades of contradictions between stories which caused confusion to readers. The project was to become The Life and Times of Scrooge McDuck. The family tree accompanying it was first published in Norway on July 3, 1993.

In the process of working on Scrooge's biography, Rosa studied Barks' old stories in detail. Rosa made note of as many clues as he could of Scrooge's past given by Barks – which Rosa dubbed "Barksian facts" – and used them to write new stories. Despite the ambitious nature of the project, Rosa himself stressed in the introduction to the book "...this version of Scrooge's life is not the 'official' version – there's no particular reason why I (or anyone else) should expect other Duck writers to adhere to my vision of Scrooge's history. As carefully and authentically as I sought to construct it, it was never intended to be anything but my personal telling of the life of Scrooge McDuck."

=== Modern family tree by Carl Barks ===
The family tree below shows the McDuck portion of Donald's family tree according to Carl Barks. The chart is based on a 1950s sketch made by Barks for personal use, which was later illustrated by artist Mark Worden in 1981. According to Barks, Matilda McDuck is married to Goosetail Gander, and the couple adopts Donald's cousin Gladstone. The character Old "Scotty" McDuck does not appear in any stories, but eventually became Fergus McDuck in Don Rosa's stories.

Modern family tree by Carl Barks

Old "Scotty"; McDuck	Duck family
Scrooge; McDuck	Matilda; McDuck	Goosetail; Gander	Hortense; McDuck	Quackmore; Duck
Gladstone; Gander (adopted)	Donald; Duck	Thelma; Duck
Huey, Dewey, and Louie

=== Modern family tree by Don Rosa ===
This family tree is based on the work of Don Rosa.

Modern family tree by Don Rosa

Quagmire; McDuck	"Dirty" Dingus; McDuck	Molly; Mallard
Angus "Pothole"; McDuck (1829–19??)	Fergus; McDuck (1835–1902)	Downy; O'Drake (1840–1897)	Jake; McDuck (1832–190?)	Duck family
Scrooge; McDuck (b. 1867)	Matilda; McDuck (b. 1871)	Hortense; McDuck (b. 1876)	Quackmore; Duck (b. 1875)
Donald; Duck (b. 1920)	Della; Duck (b. 1920)
Huey, Dewey, and Louie Duck

== The seat of Clan McDuck ==
McDuck Castle in The Old Castle's Other Secret or A Letter from Home (2004) by Don Rosa.

The seat of Clan McDuck is McDuck Castle (alternately called Castle McDuck) which is located in Dismal Downs, somewhere in Rannoch Moor, a non-fictional moorland area in north-central Scotland approximately 100 miles (160 km) north of Glasgow. The nearest village is the fictional MacDuich. The castle usually appears in good condition considering its great age. However, in the Barks story "Hound of the Whiskervilles" (1960) the castle is in ruins.

The comics continuity does not establish when McDuck Castle was built, but it first appears (on the fictional timeline) in 946 when the Saxons laid siege to it. For many centuries the castle served as the home of the clan chief. In 1675, the McDucks were run out of the castle due to the depredations of a "monstrous devil dog" in Dismal Downs, later discovered to be a plot by the rival Clan Whiskerville. At this time, many of the McDucks moved to the village of MacDuich and to Glasgow. Even after their departure, the clan still owned the castle and continued to pay the taxes by pooling their incomes. By 1885, only Fergus and Jake McDuck remain to pay the taxes, but their combined income is not enough, causing the Crown to auction it off. Scrooge then buys the estate, allowing his family to reoccupy the castle. He also hires local dogface Scottie McTerrier as caretaker. Sometime after Scottie's death, Scrooge's sister Matilda becomes caretaker.

In the DuckTales continuity, Castle McDuck was built by Scrooge's great-great grandfather Silas who incorporated the castle into an existing Druid stone circle to save on construction costs. This story would date the castle itself to about the 18th century. The Druids, seeking revenge on the McDucks for taking away their sacred meeting place, scared the clan away using trained phosphorescent hounds. Years later, Scrooge returns with Huey, Dewey, Louie, and Webby and uncovers the mystery. Scrooge befriends the Druids and partners with them to turn Castle McDuck into a tourist attraction. Scrooge plans to give a share of the profit to the Druids as reparations for desecrating their stone circle. The story is loosely based on the Barks story "Hound of the Whiskervilles", which was in turn loosely based on The Hound of the Baskervilles. In the 2017 DuckTales series, the castle is Clan McDuck's ancestral home, as in the comics, and is protected by the spirits of the McDuck ancestors buried there. Scrooge used part of his fortune to purchase and restore the castle as a home for his parents, but because he used discount druid stones, his parents were cursed with immortality and bound to the castle, which appears only once every five years.

The castle appears in the Carl Barks stories The Old Castle's Secret (1948) and Hound of the Whiskervilles (1960) and in the Don Rosa stories The Last of the Clan McDuck (1992), The New Laird of Castle McDuck (1993), The Billionaire of Dismal Downs (1993) and The Old Castle's Other Secret or A Letter from Home (2004). Other comic book authors have also used the castle, such as Andrew Galton, Dave Angus, and Vicar in The Crying Monster (1982). In the 1987 TV series DuckTales, McDuck Castle appears in the episode "The Curse of Castle McDuck". In the 2017 DuckTales series, the castle is the setting of the episodes "The Secret(s) of Castle McDuck!" and "The Fight for Castle McDuck!"

== Tartan of Clan McDuck ==
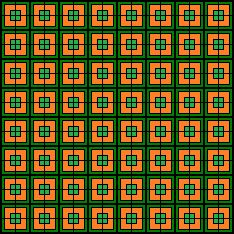
Fictional McDuck tartan as drawn by Carl Barks and colored by Dell colorists

The fictional McDuck tartan first appears in 1960 in Hound of the Whiskervilles. However, the coloring of the tartan was not Barks' decision but that of colorists working for Dell Comics, which first published the story; subsequent publications showed the tartan having differing colors. When Don Rosa decided to include the tartan in his stories, he used the original coloring of green and orange. Nevertheless, some European publications have still shown variations in Rosa's color scheme. (See Sir Roast McDuck's tam o' shanter cap in the illustration at the top of the page, which was first published in France.) The old clansmen seen on DuckTales wear a green and orange tartan, but of a slightly different design from that of the comics.

== Ancient McDucks ==
=== Scrooge Shah and Prince Donduk ===
Scrooge Shah was the last king of Sagbad and the earliest known ancestor of Scrooge McDuck. A young King Khan Khan (2050 BC-1967 BC) sacked the city of Sagbad in 2033 BC, but Scrooge Shah and Prince Donduk, his heir apparent, managed to escape. Khan Khan lost their tracks, but would much later locate their distant descendants. Prince Donduk also has three unnamed nephews who resemble Huey, Dewey, and Louie. Scrooge Shah features in the story "King Scrooge the First" (1967) by Carl Barks and Tony Strobl.

== Postclassical McDucks ==
=== Eider McDuck ===
Sir Eider McDuck (880-946; from earlier Eider MacDuich) was the chief of Clan McDuck during an Anglo-Saxon invasion in 946 (despite England and Scotland signing a peace treaty in 945). Eider was killed during the Anglo-Saxons' siege of McDuck Castle after his serfs abandoned him. He had refused to buy them arrows because they were too expensive, and only paid his serfs, collectively, 30 copper pieces an hour. Eider McDuck is first mentioned in Barks' The Old Castle's Secret (1948).

Friar Juicy McDuck (910-971) and Sir Smokt McDuck (b. 931) are buried in the McDuck cemetery as seen in the Carl Barks painting Dubious Doings at Dismal Downs.

Eider makes a cameo appearance in the 2017 DuckTales series episode, "The Secret(s) of Castle McDuck!", both as a statue in front of the titular Castle McDuck and as a ghost.

=== Slye MacDuich ===
Slye MacDuich who was enlisted as a spy for Malcolm II of Scotland, in 1018, during his conquest of the Angles.

=== Quackly McDuck ===
Sir Quackly McDuck (1010-1057; from earlier Quackly MacDuich) was clan chief when King Macbeth was killed in 1057. That same year, Macbeth offered Quackly a treasure chest in exchange for his support in the ongoing war for the throne. Quackly agreed and served the king during the war, but became obsessed with protecting the treasure, eventually trapping himself inside the castle walls with it. Quackly and his treasure became a McDuck legend, and it is believed that his ghost continues to protect the treasure and the castle.

In 1877, Quackly's ghost saves a young Scrooge McDuck from the Whiskervilles of Dismal Downs. Without revealing his true identity, he suggests to Scrooge that he travel to America and work for his Uncle Pothole, thus serving as the catalyst for all of Scrooge's adventures. In 1885, Quackly again tries to save Scrooge, but his action unintentionally brings about Scrooge's temporary death. In heaven, Quackly is reprimanded by his relatives for interfering in earthly events. Quackly McDuck is first mentioned in The Old Castle's Secret (1948) by Carl Barks, and first appears in The Last of the Clan McDuck (1994) by Don Rosa.

=== Murdoch McDuck ===
Sir Murdoch McDuck (?-1066; from earlier Murdoch MacDuich) was a businessman who patented the longbow. Most notably in 1066, when the Normans invaded England, he had the latter sign a contract with him so they would have enough longbows to fight off the invaders. However, they did not have enough arrows as Sir Murdoch charged extra for them. He is also the last of the Dark Ages McDucks and the one who modernized their family name "MacDuich" to the more familiar "McDuck". He only appears in the unfinished sketch-only story "The History of the Clan McDuck" (written and drawn approx. in 1992 by Don Rosa, but not released until December 2011), which was meant to serve as a prologue to "The Last of the Clan McDuck" before it was scrapped.

In the 2017 DuckTales series episode, "The Secret(s) of Castle McDuck!", Downy McDuck relates Murdoch's history (which remains intact) to Huey, Dewey, and Louie Duck, and Webby Vanderquack. His longbow is later used as a clue that the boys use to uncover the mystery behind their mother, Della's, disappearance.

=== Stuft McDuck ===
Sir Stuft McDuck (1110-1175) was a successful chief of Clan McDuck who oversaw a period of prosperity.

=== Roast McDuck ===
Sir Roast McDuck (1159-1205) succeeded his father, Stuft McDuck, as clan chief, while Clan McDuck was one of the richest clans in Scotland. However, in 1189, Roast offered much of the clan's wealth to the king of Scotland, William the Lion, after William asked for his help in paying tribute to Richard I of England. This act of patriotic generosity led to financial ruin for the clan. Aside from this imprudence, Roast is primarily remembered for his gluttony. In 1205, he raided the king's pantry and ate himself to death. Roast's memorial suit of armor displayed in Castle McDuck holds a knife and fork in its hands. The character is first mentioned in The Old Castle's Secret (1948) by Carl Barks. He has a small speaking role in The Last of the Clan McDuck (1994), but makes his first appearance in The New Laird of Castle McDuck.

His ghost makes a cameo appearance in the 2017 DuckTales series episode, "The Secret(s) of Castle McDuck!"

=== Swamphole McDuck ===
Sir Swamphole McDuck (1190-1260) succeeded his father, Roast McDuck, as clan chief and inherited its financial problems. In 1220, Swamphole sealed the dungeon of Castle McDuck, which he claimed was an attempt to decrease maintenance costs. He did, however, create secret passageways in the castle leading to the dungeons. (These passageways would later be useful during subsequent sieges.) After his death in 1260, Swamphole was not buried in the clan cemetery; rather, his skeleton was placed inside his memorial suit of armor, which was placed in Castle McDuck. Swamphole McDuck is first mentioned in The Old Castle's Secret by Carl Barks. In The Old Castle's Other Secret or A Letter from Home (2004) by Don Rosa, it is revealed that Swamphole sealed the dungeons not to reduce maintenance costs, but to conceal a treasure.

In the 2017 DuckTales series episode, "The Secret(s) of Castle McDuck!", he is stated to be a treasure hunter (like Scrooge) who constructed secret passageways underneath Castle McDuck and let loose a demon dog to protect his treasure. His ghost later appears to ward off said demon dog alongside the ghosts of several of his family members.

=== Donald McDuck ===
Sir Donald McDuck, nicknamed "Black Donald" because of his foul temper, is said to have invented golf, the hammer throw, and the caber toss in 1440. His temper while playing golf resulted in James II of Scotland outlawing the sport. Black Donald is mentioned in "The History of the Clan McDuck" by Don Rosa.

In the 2017 DuckTales series episode "The Missing Links of Moorshire!", Scrooge McDuck relates the story of how "Black Donald" McDuck invented golf and subsequently got it banned due to his temper to Dewey, Louie, and Webby before participating in a golf tournament in Scotland.

=== Simon McDuck ===
Sir Simon McDuck (1437-1509) was the treasurer of the Knights Templar and hid their treasure beneath McDuck Castle. He is mentioned in The Old Castle's Other Secret or A Letter from Home (2004) by Don Rosa.

In the 2017 DuckTales series episode, "The Secret(s) of Castle McDuck", Scrooge McDuck states Simon was the "accountant" to the Knights Templar who had stolen and hidden their treasure somewhere underneath Castle McDuck, and he had returned to his father Fergus to reluctantly ask for his help in finding it since he knows where it is. His ghost appears later in the episode to stop a ghost hound from attacking Scrooge's grandnephews, Huey, Dewey, and Louie.

== Early modern McDucks ==
=== Malcolm "Matey" McDuck ===
Malcolm "Matey" McDuck (1530-1564?) was a McDuck relative who settled in England and is suggested to be a previous incarnation of Scrooge McDuck. Malcolm served in the English Navy, and in 1563 he became first mate of the frigate HMS Falcon Rover, serving under Captain Loyal Hawk. The Falcon Rover raided Spanish targets in the Caribbean Sea between 1563 and 1564. Also serving on the Falcon Rover was the boatswain, Pintail Duck, whose descendant, Quackmore Duck, would marry Malcolm's descendant, Hortense McDuck. The two were the parents of twins Donald and Della Duck.

Malcolm is said to have lost his life on 9 December 1564 when the Spanish fleet sank HMS Falcon Rover. However, in 1579, Malcolm was also said to have commanded the newly founded Fort Drakeborough, an establishment that in 1818 was taken over by Cornelius Coot and renamed Fort Duckburg. Malcolm first appears in "Back to Long Ago!" (1956) by Carl Barks.

He is mentioned on Webby Vanderquack's family chart in the 2017 DuckTales series.

=== Locksley McDuck ===
Locksley McDuck was an 18th-century McDuck relative. Sometime after 1707, he became an associate of Scottish outlaw Rob Roy MacGregor who is characterized as a noble thief who would "rob from the rich to give to the poor". Locksley's alliance with MacGregor would come to an end after Locksley was unable to "give to the poor" after having robbed the rich. He is mentioned in The History of The Clan McDuck by Don Rosa. His name is derived from the English village of Loxley, the traditional birthplace of Robin Hood.

=== Hugh "Seafoam" McDuck ===
Captain Hugh "Seafoam" McDuck (1710-1776) was a McDuck relative who settled in Glasgow in 1727, as the clan had been driven from their ancestral home of Dismal Downs in 1675. Hugh turned to the sea for a living and became a successful merchant. He obtained his own ship, the Golden Goose, and became known by the nickname "Seafoam".

In 1753, Seafoam McDuck signed a contract with Swindle McSue to deliver a cargo of horseradish to Jamaica. But McSue sabotaged the Golden Goose and the ship sank before reaching Jamaica. Upon returning to Scotland, Seafoam McDuck learned that his contract with McSue contained fine print stating that if the shipment was not completed, McDuck would forfeit all his possessions to McSue. Seafoam escaped with nothing but the clothes on his back, a silver pocket watch, and the golden dentures in his mouth. It is later presumed that Seafoam was involved in the American Revolutionary War and died in 1776. His descendant Quagmire McDuck inherited the silver pocket watch. Seafoam McDuck first appears in The Horseradish Story (1953) by Carl Barks. According to Don Rosa, he is Scrooge's great-great-great-grandfather.

His ghost makes a cameo appearance in the 2017 DuckTales series episode, "The Secret(s) of Castle McDuck".

=== Potcrack McDuck ===
Potcrack McDuck was a member of Clan McDuck, who invented steam-powered bagpipes in 1767, his invention later inspired James Watt to create the steam engine.

=== Silas McDuck ===
Silas McDuck was a member of Clan McDuck and Scrooge's great-great-grandfather. He was very wealthy and built Castle McDuck for his large family to live in. Despite the ground being cursed by druids, Silas finished the constructions and the McDucks moved in, only to be scared away by the frightening Hound of Castle McDuck. Spending what little he had left from erecting the castle, Silas built Cottage McDuck, where the family lived in poverty until Scrooge left for America.

== Modern McDucks (1st generation) ==
=== Dingus McDuck ===
"Dirty" Dingus McDuck, was Scrooge's paternal grandfather. He worked as a coal miner, married Molly Mallard, and had three sons – Angus, Fergus, and Jake. He appeared in Don Rosa's illustrated family tree, but has not appeared in any comic book stories. A 1960 story by Bob Gregory and Tony Strobl identifies Scrooge's grandfather as Titus McDuck.

In the 2017 DuckTales series episode, "The Secret(s) of Castle McDuck", Dingus is revealed to have had an antagonistic relationship with his son, Fergus (not unlike that of the latter and his son, Scrooge). In fact, knowing he would seek out Simon McDuck's treasure, he left his son a note telling him to work hard and not accept hand-outs inside a hidden chamber underneath Castle McDuck.

=== Molly Mallard ===
Molly McDuck (née Mallard) was the wife of Dingus McDuck, Scrooge's paternal grandmother, and the mother of Angus, Fergus, and Jake McDuck. Her first and only appearance was in an illustrated family tree created by Don Rosa; she has not appeared in any stories. Coincidentally, her maiden name is the same as the title character of Darkwing Duck.

Her ghost makes a cameo appearance in the 2017 DuckTales series' episode, "The Secret(s) of Castle McDuck!"

=== Quagmire McDuck ===
Quagmire McDuck was Dingus McDuck's brother and Scrooge McDuck's paternal great uncle. He inherited a silver watch from his ancestor Hugh "Seafoam" McDuck and passed it on to his nephew Fergus. After his death, Quagmire's estate remained unclaimed. Quagmire appears in the Carl Barks story "The Heirloom Watch" (1955).

His ghost makes a cameo appearance in the 2017 DuckTales series episode, "The Secret(s) of Castle McDuck".

== Modern McDucks (2nd generation) ==
=== Angus "Pothole" McDuck ===
Angus "Pothole" McDuck (born 1829) is the first child of Dingus and Molly McDuck, and is Scrooge's paternal uncle. Angus was born in Glasgow in 1829. He was first mentioned in "The Great Steamboat Race" by Carl Barks and later appeared in person in a handful of stories by Don Rosa.

Angus migrated to the United States during the late 1840s. In 1850 he was working as a cabin boy in the Mississippi riverboat Drennan Whyte when it sank. He was the only survivor. He continued working on Mississippi riverboats and he had obtained his own by 1861, named Cotton Queen. Around the time of the American Civil War (1861–1865) he became quite successful as a river boater. Soon after the end of the war in 1865 he and fellow river boater Porker Hogg became the co-owners of Cornpone Gables, a Southern plantation that had gone bankrupt. The two were unable to settle their differences and they decided to have a riverboat race in 1870 to decide who would be the owner. Both riverboats sank. Porker had two more riverboats but Angus spent the next ten years as a professional card player.

In 1880, in a poker game with Porker, Angus won the rights to one of his rival's riverboats, named Dilly Dollar. Porker soon lost his other riverboat to Blackheart Beagle and his sons, the first generation of the Beagle Boys, a family of outlaws, and retired. Angus on the other hand hired his nephew Scrooge McDuck and a penniless inventor named Ratchet Gearloose as his crew. Business wasn't going well and Angus decided to retire in 1882. He left his riverboat to his nephew and settled down in New Orleans.

He became the writer of a series of dime novels under the title The Master of Mississippi, based on a highly exaggerated description of his life. His dime novels became very popular and to have more material to add he occasionally traveled through the country. In the story "The Vigilante of Pizen Bluff" by Don Rosa, he is seen appearing at Buffalo Bill's Wild West. After the show's money is stolen by the Dalton Gang, Angus rides out with Bill, Scrooge, P. T. Barnum, Annie Oakley, and Geronimo to stop the bandits.

Angus' exact date of death is unknown.

In 1955, Porker's nephew, Horseshoe Hogg, and Scrooge McDuck would bring their uncles' steamboats back to the surface to finish the race for Cornpone Gables. Scrooge won, only to learn that 85 years of disuse made the mansion so fragile that he accidentally destroyed it with a sneeze.

A character based on Angus named "Catfish" McDuck appears in the 1987 DuckTales episode, "Once Upon a Dime", voiced by Peter Renaday,

=== Fergus McDuck ===
Fergus McDuck (1835–1902) is the second child of Dingus and Molly McDuck and the father of Scrooge McDuck. As such he is a prominent character in The Life and Times of Scrooge McDuck.

He was born in Glasgow in 1835 to Dingus McDuck and Molly Mallard, who were both working as coal miners at the time. He spent most of his life as a mill worker.

According to a story by William Van Horn, Fergus at some point had a short marriage with an unidentified woman, with whom he had the son Rumpus McFowl. He later married Downy O'Drake, his wife in Rosa's stories, who became the mother of three of his children – Scrooge, Matilda, and Hortense.

The rest of Fergus' biography is shown in The Life and Times of Scrooge McDuck. In 1877 he encouraged his son to work to have his own money. Scrooge's obvious intelligence, diligence and ambition made his father believe that Scrooge would be able to restore Clan McDuck to its former glory. In the story Of Ducks, Dimes, and Destinies, it is revealed that Scrooge's Number One Dime came from Fergus, who gave it to the man who used it to pay Scrooge for shining his shoes.

In 1885 the Clan's hereditary lands would have been seized due to Fergus' inability to pay his taxes. But Scrooge spent his savings at the time ($10,000) to pay the taxes and become the new owner of their lands. While Scrooge was away, Fergus and his family moved back to Castle McDuck, abandoned for centuries in Dismal Downs. The family continued to work to pay for the taxes, and Scrooge sent them money he earned while traveling. Fergus became a widower in 1897.

Scrooge became rich in the Klondike and returned to Scotland in 1902 as a billionaire. Scrooge's intention was originally to settle in Dismal Downs, but he quickly changed his mind and decided to settle in the United States. He wanted to take his family with him. His sisters accepted, but Fergus decided to stay. He died during the night, aged 72, and was re-united with his wife Downy and the rest of the McDuck Clan as his three children left Scotland.

In Don Rosa's The Old Castle's Other Secret or A Letter from Home (2004), it's revealed that Fergus tried to find the Knights Templar treasure hidden in the castle McDuck by one of his ancestors, a Knight himself. Even though Fergus decided not to tell Scrooge about the treasure, he learns about it through other ways and, like Matilda McDuck, thinks Fergus kept the secret from him because he disapproved of Scrooge. In the middle of their way to the treasure, Scrooge, Matilda and Scrooge's nephews find a letter from Fergus, who believed Scrooge would eventually find it, revealing the reason he hid the secret from Scrooge is that Scrooge would feel better building his own fortune instead of inheriting one.

Fergus appears in the classic 1987 DuckTales episode, "Once Upon a Dime", which explores Scrooge's history. Here he is referred to as "McPapa." Fergus' name and image are also present in the 2017 DuckTales series, which draws heavily from the comics. He later appears in the episode "The Secret(s) of Castle McDuck!", having survived to the present day due to Scrooge rebuilding Castle McDuck using magic stones that granted his parents immortality. Scrooge and Fergus' relationship is initially tense, with the latter expressing apparent disapproval of the former; though in reality, he was upset because Scrooge had not been a part of his life. They later reconcile after Fergus reveals he was the one who gave Scrooge his Number One Dime, via Burt the Ditch Digger, in order to give him the gift of "self-reliance" since he was unable to afford a proper gift for him. Alan Young, who voiced Scrooge in the original series, was meant to provide Fergus's voice, but died before he could record any dialogue and the role went to Graham McTavish.

In the 1993 NES game DuckTales 2, Scrooge and his nephews found a piece of a treasure map that led to the lost treasure of a character named Fergus McDuck. However, this Fergus is not Scrooge's father but Scrooge's great-great-uncle.

=== Downy O'Drake ===
Downy McDuck (née O'Drake; 1840–1897) is Scrooge McDuck's mother. She was created by Don Rosa and first appears in The Life and Times of Scrooge McDuck. She is of Irish origin and was born in 1840.

She was a very devoted housewife and mother. She settled in Castle McDuck at Dismal Downs, Clan McDuck's old castle, along with her family in 1885. She died in 1897, and was buried in the McDucks' cemetery. She later appeared to her husband Fergus at his own passing, and together they joined various McDuck ancestors.

Downy's image and name are also present in the 2017 incarnation of DuckTales, usually alongside those of her husband. Alongside Fergus, she makes a physical appearance in the episode, "The Secret(s) of Castle McDuck!", voiced by Ashley Jensen.

=== Jake McDuck ===
Jake McDuck (1832–?) is Scrooge McDuck's uncle. He was mentioned in the story "A Christmas for Shacktown" (1952) by Carl Barks, in which Donald Duck dresses up as Jake in an attempt to trick Scrooge into giving money to charity.

The character was later used by Don Rosa, and appears in three of twelve original chapters of Rosa's The Life and Times of Scrooge McDuck. He lived in the same house as his brother Fergus McDuck and helped Fergus and his wife Downy O'Drake to raise their children. He settled in McDuck castle along with his brother in 1885. However, it appears that by 1902, Jake was no longer living there.

According to Rosa's sketches and timelines, Jake was born in 1832 to coal miners Dingus McDuck and Molly Mallard, and grew up to become a stockyard hand in Glasgow. His date of death is unknown, but it appears that both Scrooge and Donald believed him to be alive in 1952.

== Modern McDucks (3rd generation) ==
=== Scrooge McDuck ===
Scrooge McDuck (1867, according to Don Rosa) is the first child of Fergus and Downy McDuck and is the protagonist of most stories involving the Clan McDuck. Unlike his two younger sisters, he remains unmarried, but in the DuckTales reboot episode "The Last Adventure", Webby is revealed to actually be Scrooge's daughter via cloning and her original F.O.W.L. given name is April. In the original, Webby and April are two separate characters and neither are related to Scrooge. Also, he comes to maintain close relationships with his nephew Donald Duck and his grandnephews Huey, Dewey, and Louie Duck.

=== Matilda McDuck ===
Matilda McDuck (born 1871) is one of Scrooge McDuck's two younger sisters, the maternal aunt of his niece and nephew, Donald Duck and Della Duck and the maternal grandaunt of Huey, Dewey, and Louie. She was first mentioned in Carl Barks' 1950s sketch for a Duck family tree, where she was shown to have adopted Gladstone Gander. The Matilda McDuck character was dropped in Barks' 1991 Duck Family Tree sketch (where Gladstone Gander is the biological grandson of Grandma Duck and not related to Scrooge), but Don Rosa picked up the name, and used Matilda McDuck as a prominent character in The Life and Times of Scrooge McDuck.

Matilda McDuck was born in Glasgow, Scotland, in 1871 to Fergus McDuck and Downy O'Drake. She is the younger sister of Scrooge McDuck. She has a younger sister named Hortense.

In contrast to Scrooge and Hortense's fiery tempers, she usually had a calm demeanor. In 1902 Scrooge returned to Scotland and took both of his younger sisters with him to go to America. When he established his base in Duckburg, Calisota, United States he left Matilda and Hortense to run his empire from 1902 to 1930. In the meantime he traveled the world expanding his financial empire. In 1930, a conflict with Scrooge ended all relationships between him and his family, and his younger sisters are believed to have left Duckburg.

In the story The Old Castle's Other Secret or A Letter from Home (2004), Don Rosa used Matilda McDuck in a non-Life and Times story for the first time. In this story, it is shown that she was hired by her nephew Donald Duck (son of Hortense) to tend the McDuck castle in Scotland. The story shows the reconciliation between Matilda and Scrooge. It is suggested that Donald deliberately set them up for a reunion. Unfortunately, he did not get the thanks he expected until Scrooge admitted his shameful actions and regrets. This is the first time Huey, Dewey, and Louie met their maternal great aunt. In that story, Scrooge returns to McDuck Castle for another treasure and learns from Matilda that his family already knew about the treasure but their father Fergus decided not to tell Scrooge about it. Both Scrooge and Matilda thought that was because of Fergus' disapproval of Scrooge's greedy ways but after finding a letter on the way for the treasure (hence the other title "A Letter from Home") they learn Fergus's real motive was that he thought Scrooge would feel better building his own fortune instead of simply inheriting one.

Matilda, while trying to leave the castle, mentions Hortense. However, in the commentary in the American printing of the story, Don Rosa states that he was prevented from using Hortense because he would have had to explain why she had abandoned her family. So Hortense's fate remains a mystery. In the notes to the Danish publication of the story (Hall of Fame - Don Rosa Book 10), it is stated that the publisher decided that Hortense was "officially dead".

Matilda is usually drawn with a flower on her hat, which loses a petal in each panel in which she appears.

Don Rosa has suggested that Matilda McDuck could have married the well-known Disney character Ludwig Von Drake.

A picture of Matilda appears in the 2017 DuckTales series pilot episode, "Woo-oo!", as part of Webby's research on Scrooge's family. She later appears in person in the episode "The Fight for Castle McDuck!", voiced by Michelle Gomez.

=== Hortense McDuck ===
Hortense Duck (née McDuck; b. 1876) was introduced as a relatively well-connected member of her family. A daughter-in-law of Humperdink Duck and Elvira Duck, a younger sister to Matilda McDuck and Scrooge McDuck, wife to Quackmore Duck, sister-in-law of Goostave Gander and Daphne Duck, aunt to Gladstone Gander, mother of Della Duck and Donald Duck, and finally maternal grandmother of Huey, Dewey, and Louie.

Hortense was born in 1876 in Glasgow, Scotland as the youngest child of Fergus McDuck and Downy O'Drake. In Barks' tree, her oldest brother was Scrooge McDuck and her older sister Matilda McDuck. Some non-Barks writers gave Scrooge two half-brothers, Rumpus McFowl and Gideon McDuck, though these do not appear in Barks' conception of the family. De' Paperoni is a twin of Scrooge in a story. Jake McDuck, her paternal uncle, was also living with them.

Hortense was born in a working class family living in relative poverty. In 1877 her ten-year-old brother Scrooge started working as a shoe polisher in an effort to help support his family. At the time Hortense was merely an infant sucking on her thumb. She observed from a distance with her father and sister while her brother earned the number one dime. Scrooge would spend some of his leisure time with his younger sisters, and occasionally repaired their dolls. Otherwise Hortense spent most of her time clinging to her older sister.

By 1880, Scrooge came to realize that his earnings were not enough despite his hard work and efforts. He emigrated to the United States in hopes of earning his own fortune. He was hired as a cabin boy on a merchant ship heading to New Orleans. Scrooge noted that Hortense's "Bye, Scroogey" were her first spoken words. Before that, all she could say was "glxblt".

From an early age it was obvious Hortense had a fairly nasty temper combined with considerable strength, and on at least one occasion (in The Life and Times of Scrooge McDuck, Chapter 10) she has been called a spitfire. In 1882, Scrooge was hired as a cowboy by Murdo MacKenzie. To do this he had to ride Widow Maker, a mare who had already managed to dispose of five other cowboys. Scrooge soon managed to become her rider although he never really managed to tame her. He renamed the horse Hortense after his spirited six-year-old sister. The latter found this idea unflattering at best.

In 1885, the Clan McDuck's hereditary lands were in danger of being seized due to her father being unable to pay taxes. The lands also included Dismal Downs, the Clan's castle which had been abandoned since 1675. The Whiskervilles, traditional enemies of the McDucks since the 15th century, planned to gain ownership of the lands and were already trying to plunder the castle and its graveyard in search of old relics and treasure. Fergus and Jake guarded the Castle in order to stop them. Nine-year-old Hortense offered to help them and proved more effective in conflict than either of the elder McDucks. The Whiskervilles came to fear her.

In 1902 Scrooge McDuck returned to Scotland to fetch Hortense and their sister Matilda McDuck. When Scrooge established Duckburg, Calisota as his home base he started journeying the world trying to expand his financial empire. One of her proudest moments was when she single-handedly caused the entire US military to flee Killmotor Hill armed only with a broom and her bad temper, much to the shame of the current president, Theodore Roosevelt, and the fear of the soldiers. From 1902 until 1930, she and Matilda ran Scrooge's empire from his home base while he was away. During these years Hortense met her boyfriend, Quackmore Duck, whom she married in 1920. Later the same year she gave birth to twins. Her son was named Donald Duck and her daughter Della Duck. Of the two only Donald inherited his mother's temper. A fight with Scrooge in 1930 ended all relationships between Scrooge and his family and she retired.

Scrooge may have claimed that he is the last McDuck, as he is the only male left. Hortense and Matilda changed their names to Duck after marriage, so, technically, Scrooge is the last McDuck.

Hortense is mentioned and pictured in the DuckTales 2017 premier "Woo-oo!", where Webby Vanderquack cites her as a connecting link between the triplets and Scrooge.

In a 2024 comic, Hortense was revealed to be an adventurer and a scientist, who studied apes, until she disappeared, Scrooge traveled to Africa to investigate, however she still wasn't found, but Donald read her letters she wrote to him over the years. She was hinted to still be alive, with her brother saying she could return.

=== Rumpus McFowl ===
Rumpus McFowl was created by William Van Horn and introduced as a lazy and greedy cousin of Scrooge McDuck. It was soon revealed that he was in fact Scrooge's half-brother, born during his mother's brief marriage to Fergus McDuck.

Rumpus McFowl is a tall, obese duck who wears a green coat and a black bowler hat. He is not ashamed to take advantage of Scrooge McDuck's money at every chance he gets, citing his relationship to Scrooge as the reason. He has never been shown to do any work. Scrooge views Rumpus as a useless good-for-nothing and tries his best to get rid of his company.

=== Gideon McDuck ===
Gideon represented in an Italian-made picture, holding a copy of "The Cricket" (Il Grillo Parlante)

Gideon McDuck (Gedeone de' Paperoni in original Italian) is Scrooge McDuck's moralistic brother, and is a recurring character in Italian comic stories; in those stories, Gideon is the editor of the newspaper The County Conscience, the most credible newspaper in Duckburg. The newspaper is originally known as "Il Grillo Parlante", which is the Italian name of the Pinocchio character The Talking Cricket and its Disney version Jiminy Cricket; a statue of Jiminy is therefore present in Gideon's office. Gideon also has an antagonistic relationship with his brother Scrooge.

The character was created by Romano Scarpa, and first appeared in the story "Paperino e i gamberi in salmì" (1956). The character's debut story is the only one that was printed in the United States, as it was published in 2015 under the title "Shellfish Motives".

Gideon's existence is inconsistent with a statement made in Carl Barks's "The Old Castle's Secret". In this story, Scrooge states that he is the last of the Clan McDuck, which would mean that he couldn't have a living sibling. However, Gideon is not the only living relative of Scrooge to carry the surname "McDuck", and therefore cause the same inconsistency with Barks's story; others include his sister Matilda and first cousin Douglas. In the American translation of "Shellfish Motives" Gideon is said to be younger than Scrooge, while the original version doesn't specify which one of them is younger.

=== Douglas McDuck ===
Douglas McDuck is a cousin of Scrooge who has appeared in several Danish Disney comic stories. He looks like Scrooge not only in appearance but also in temperament. He is so incredibly stingy that he considers Scrooge a spendthrift, often criticizing a frustrated Scrooge for not being "McDuck-like" enough. Douglas is, however, hopeless at finding and identifying gold; he generally lives a rustic life in mining country, locating only fool's gold and earning a modest living. In the story "Smarter Than The Toughies", Douglas was portrayed as being the uncle of Whitewater Duck.

=== Moocher McDuck ===
Moocher McDuck is the beggar cousin of Scrooge who appeared for the first time in the story "Too Many McDucks" by Tony Strobl. Moocher's look is very similar to Scrooge's, except for the fact that he wears tattered clothes, but unlike his very rich cousin, Moocher is a sweetheart. He was used in some Brazilian comic stories in the 1970s.

=== Cyril McDuck ===
Cyril McDuck is the banished cousin of Scrooge, who appeared in the story The Search for Cyril, by Bob Gregory, where he failed to pass a “stinginess test” given to him by Dingus McDuck (called Titus McDuck), where each child of Clan McDuck would be given money to save, however Cyril failed buying candy for some children, and was banished to the Scottish Highlands, where he became a goatherd. In the story Donald sees that Scrooge has a photo of every Clan McDuck member, except for Cyril, and Donald attempts to photograph him.

== Other relatives ==
=== Duck family ===
The Duck family are Scrooge's American relatives and include his nephew Donald, niece Della and grandnephews Huey, Dewey, and Louie. They are related through Hortense's marriage to Quackmore Duck, Donald's father.

=== Aunt Eider ===
Aunt Eider is the aunt of both Scrooge McDuck and John D. Rockerduck. The Italian story "La Stella di Burbank", where she is portrayed as a myopic old woman who doesn't realize she needs to wear glasses, is presumably her first comic book appearance. But Aunt Eider appears wearing glasses in her next three comic book appearances. Dick Kinney wrote the last three comic stories where this character was used, and three famous cartoonists respectively drew those ones. Al Hubbard, Marco Rota and Giorgio Cavazzano. Neither of these stories was published in America. The story "Most Helpful Aunt Eider" is the only one where Aunt Eider doesn't meet her wealthy nephews. It's a Junior Woodchucks story.

Since there isn't any clue on how the tireless and slightly bossy Aunt Eider could be the aunt of both Scrooge and Rockerduck in the comic stories with her, some fans of this universe have invented their own explanations for this fact. It really seems she never had a surname, so she has been connected to Scrooge's family through his paternal grandmother, Molly Mallard, who would be an aunt of Eider. This would make Eider a Mallard too, but, of course, this is not a widely accepted explanation at all. According to this same invented explanation, Aunt Eider would be a sister of Rockerduck's mother.

=== Ludwig Von Drake ===
Ludwig Von Drake is Donald Duck's uncle. Their exact relationship has only rarely been described. Don Rosa fans have speculated that Ludwig is married to Matilda McDuck, while the Disney company have portrayed him as a bachelor. Walt Disney stated Ludwig is Donald's father's brother.

=== Aunt Vera ===
Aunt Vera is Scrooge McDuck and Rumpus McFowl's mutual aunt. She is only briefly mentioned, where she gave her nephew Rumpus information that informed him and Scrooge that they were half-brothers. She is also mentioned to be living, however the exact relationship to Scrooge and Clan McDuck is unknown.

== In other languages ==
- Arabic: عشيرة البط, "The Duck Clan"
- Bulgarian: Семейство МакДък, "Family Makdak"
- Danish: von And-Klanen
- Dutch: McDuck clan
- Finnish: MacAnkan Klaani
- French: Le clan McPicsou
- German: Der Duck-Clan
- Greek: Γενιά των Μακ Ντακ, "The line of the Mac Ducks"
- Icelandic: Ættin Aðalönd, "Family Aethalönd". The term Ættin refers to an extended family, dynasty, or clan.
- Indonesian: Klan Bebek
- Italian: Il clan de' Paperoni
- Norwegian: McDuck-klanen
- Polish: Klan McKwaczów
- Portuguese: Clã Mac Patinhas/Clã Mac Pato
- Spanish: El clan McPato
- Swedish: Klanen von Anka
- Turkish: McDuck Klanı
- Persian: Khaanevaade-ye Daack(خانواده داک)

In the Dutch and Finnish languages, Scrooge personally drops the "Mac/Mc" from his last name while other members of his family retain it.

== See also ==
Donald Duck universe:

- Duck family (Disney)
- List of Donald Duck universe characters
- The Life and Times of Scrooge McDuck
- Scrooge McDuck (character)

Real-life:

- Rannoch Moor
- List of Scottish clans
- List of family seats of Scottish nobility
