= Roast (disambiguation) =

Roasting is a cooking method.

Roast or roasting may also refer to:

- Roasting (metallurgy), a metallurgy process in which sulfidic ores are converted to oxides
- Roast (comedy), A type of humour involving an individual that is ridiculed and jokingly insulted by one or more people, for amusement or humiliation
- Sir Roast McDuck, a Disney character who is an ancestor of Scrooge McDuck and Donald Duck
