= Duck family =

Duck family may refer to:

- A familial grouping for a duck, i.e. a drake and a female and their ducklings
- Anatidae, the scientific taxonomic family that ducks are classified under
- Duck family (Disney), the fictional family of cartoon ducks related to Donald Duck
