= Duck family (Disney) =

Disney comics characters

Lavender and Old Lace by Carl Barks; from left to right: (standing) Scrooge McDuck, Grandma Duck, Donald Duck, Daisy Duck, Gladstone Gander; (seated) Huey, Louie, and Dewey Duck; (foreground) Gyro Gearloose (unrelated) and Gus Goose

The Duck family is a fictional family of cartoon ducks related to Disney character Donald Duck. The family is also related to the Coot, Goose, and Gander families, as well as the Scottish Clan McDuck. Besides Donald, the best-known members of the Duck family are Huey, Dewey, and Louie, Donald's triplet nephews.

Members of the Duck family appear most extensively in Donald Duck comics (although some have made animated appearances). In 1993, American comics author Don Rosa published a Duck Family Tree that established the characters' relationships in his stories. He also created a fictional timeline for when certain characters were born (All birth/death dates given below are Rosa's). Other comics authors both before and after have shown variations in the family.

== Development ==
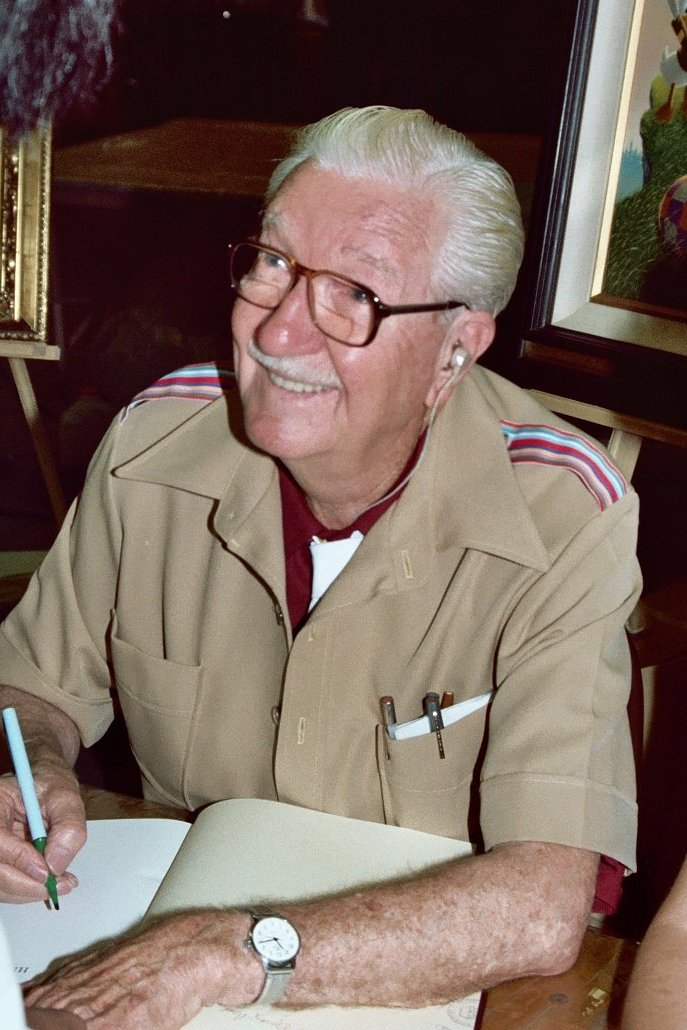
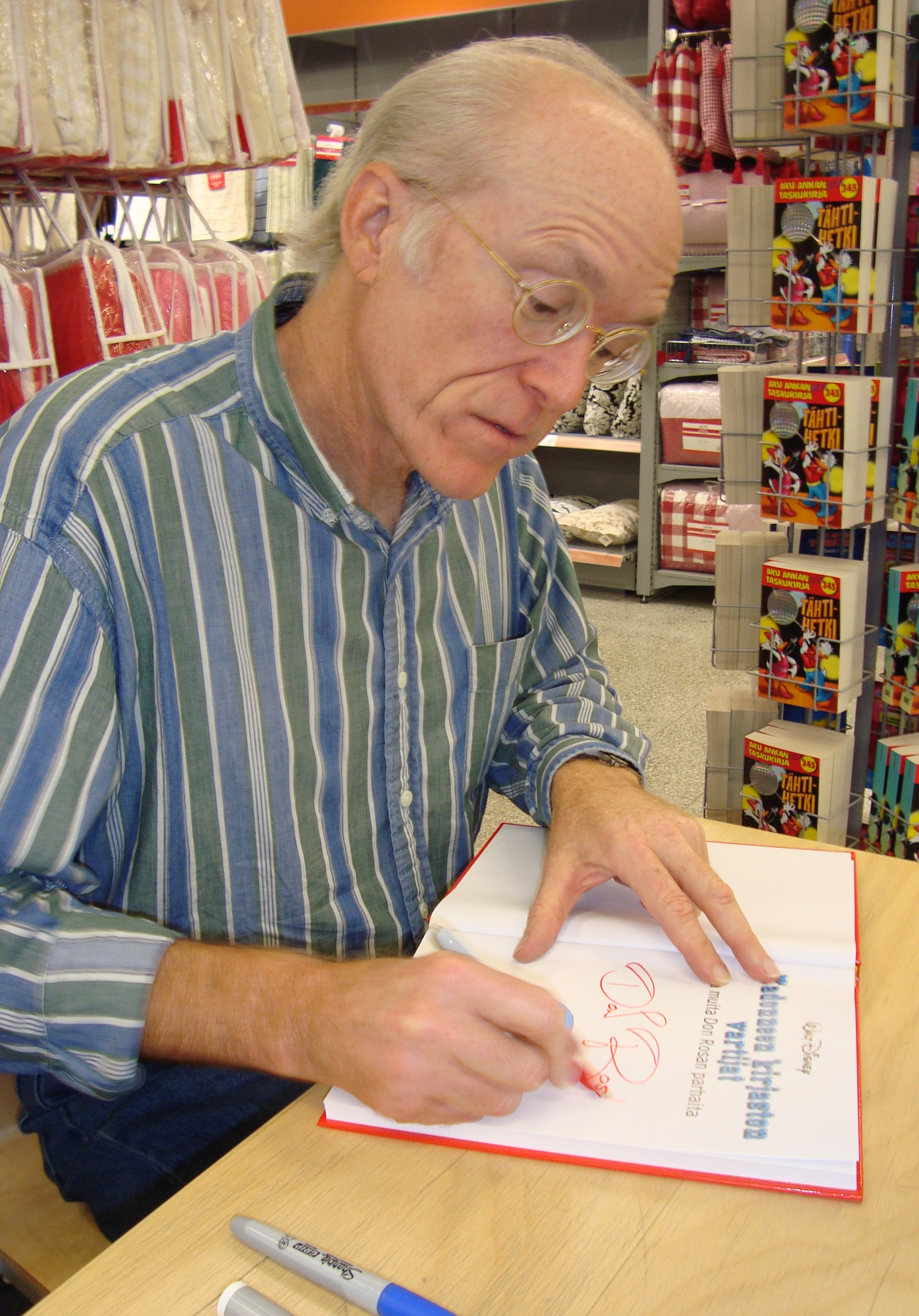
Carl Barks (left) and Don Rosa (right)

In the early 1950s Carl Barks was in his second decade of creating comic book stories starring Donald Duck and his various relatives. He had personally created several of the latter, such as Scrooge McDuck (Donald's uncle) and Gladstone Gander (Donald's cousin). To better define their relations, Barks created a family tree, wherein he added several previously unknown relatives to fill in the gaps. Barks never intended to publish this family tree and created it only for personal reference.

The first public attempt at a coherent biography of the Ducks was published in 1974. An Informal Biography of Scrooge McDuck by science fiction author Jack Chalker used names and events in the Barks stories (and a very few non-Barks ones) to create a life story for Scrooge. It provided the basis for a Scrooge McDuck biography included in The People's Almanac.

In 1981, Barks was well into his retirement, but his stories remained popular and had gained him unexpected fame. He had given several interviews and answered questions about his personal views on the characters and their stories. Among other subjects, Barks described his early version of the family tree. Rough sketches of the tree were published in a number of fanzines and were appreciated by fans for the authoritative background information this provided. At this point, Mark Worden decided to create a drawing of Barks' Duck Family Tree, including portraits of the characters mentioned. Otherwise, Worden made few changes, most notably adding Daisy Duck as Donald's main love interest. His illustrated version of the tree was first published in several fanzines and later in The Carl Barks Library.

In 1987, Don Rosa, a long-time fan of Barks and personal friend of Mark Worden, started creating his own stories featuring Scrooge McDuck and his kin. Rosa's stories contained numerous references to Barks' stories and introduced original background information. After several years, Rosa gained a large international fanbase of his own. In the early 1990s, Egmont (the publishing house employing Don Rosa after Gladstone Publishing's initial run), offered him an ambitious assignment — to create the definitive version of Scrooge's biography and a family tree accompanying it. This was supposed to decisively put an end to decades of seeming contradictions between stories by different authors, which had caused confusion to readers. The project was to become the award-winning, The Life and Times of Scrooge McDuck, a chronology of epic proportions that spawned numerous other timeline stories, collected in a companion volume. Rosa's Duck Family Tree accompanying the series was first published in Norway on July 3, 1993.

In the process of working on Scrooge's biography, Rosa studied Barks' old stories mentioning his past. Then he added several ideas of his own. Among them were biographical information for Scrooge's supporting cast, as well as designing characters in the family that had only been mentioned by Barks, such as Donald's sister Della and Scrooge's parents, sisters and uncles.

== Family tree by Carl Barks ==
The family tree below shows the Goose (left) and Duck (right) portions of Donald's family tree according to Carl Barks. The chart is based on a 1950s sketch made by Barks for personal use, which was later illustrated by artist Mark Worden in 1981.

Family tree by Carl Barks

? Goose | Grandma; Duck
? Goose | Luke; Goose | Daphne; Duck | Quackmore; Duck
Gus; Goose | Gladstone; Gander (né Goose) | Daisy; Duck | Donald; Duck

Clan; McDuck
Hortense; McDuck
Thelma; Duck
Huey, Dewey, and Louie

== Family tree by Don Rosa ==
In 1993, Don Rosa published his version of the Duck family tree as part of his 12-part comics series The Life and Times of Scrooge McDuck. The most significant change was Rosa's expansion of the family tree to include the Coot relatives. Rosa also added Goostave Gander as the father of Gladstone, and made Luke Goose the father of Gus, rather than his uncle.

The chart below is Rosa's tree, which shows relationships within the Coot family (left) and Duck family (right).

Family tree by Don Rosa

Cornelius; Coot | Pintail; Duck (ancestor)
Clinton; Coot | Gertrude; Gadwall
Gretchen; Grebe | Casey; Coot | Elvira "Grandma Duck"; Coot | Humperdink; Duck | Clan; McDuck
Luke; Goose | Fanny; Coot | Cuthbert; Coot | Lulubelle; Loon | Eider; Duck | Goostave; Gander | Daphne; Duck | Quackmore; Duck | Hortense; McDuck
Gus; Goose | Abner "Whitewater"; Duck | Fethry; Duck | Gladstone; Gander | Donald; Duck | Della; Duck
Huey, Dewey, and Louie

== Ancestors ==
=== Andold "Wild Duck" Temerary ===
Andold "Wild Duck" Temerary (Italian: Mac Paperin) was created by Gaudenzio Capelli and Marco Rota and appears in stories set in the Middle Ages. His first appearance was in "Paperino e il piccolo Krack" ("Donald Duck and the Little Krack"), published in Almanacco Topolino #228 (Dec 1975). He is a lookalike and ancestor to Donald Duck. Andold was a commander who protected the shores of Caledonia (Scotland) from Vikings. He has a girlfriend named Aydis who looks like Daisy Duck, and he also has five soldiers, two of them are named Little Bo and Big Brutus.

Andold wears a helmet, topped with a miniature decoration representing his own face. As a comical touch, the decoration's facial expression always matches Andold's own, changing between panels if necessary.

In the first Andold story (Paperino e il piccolo Krack from 1975), Donald dreams about Andold, in the second (Le avventure di Mac Paperin: L'arrosto della salvezza from 1980, published in the United States as Donald Duck and his fierce ancestor... Andold Wild Duck), Huey, Dewey, and Louie are reading a book about his adventures. In later Andold stories, the modern-day Ducks do not appear. All Andold Wild Duck stories are illustrated by Marco Rota, and most of them are also written by him.

The first Andold comic to be published in English was Donald Duck... and his fierce ancestor... Andold Wild Duck by Rota, published in a December 1993 edition of Donald Duck Adventures with cover illustration by Don Rosa featuring Andold.

The names Andold and Aydis are anagrams of Donald and Daisy.

=== Pintail Duck ===
Pintail Duck was a 16th-century Duck relative and the first early ancestor to appear in the comics (in Barks' 1956 story, Back to Long Ago). Pintail served in the Royal Navy as the boatswain aboard HMS Falcon Rover. The Falcon Rover raided Spanish targets in the Caribbean Sea between 1563 and 1564 when the ship was sunk. Pintail was friends with the ship's first mate, Malcom "Matey" McDuck, who was a mutual ancestor of Donald and Scrooge.

=== Don de Pato ===
Don de Pato was a 16th-century Spanish ancestor of Donald through both the Coot family and Clan McDuck, first appearing in the 1965 comic The Golden Galleon written by Carl Fallberg with art by Tony Strobl. He was a member of the Spanish Armada.

In the TV series Legend of the Three Caballeros, he appears under the name Don Dugo (used previously in German and Dutch translations of the comic), as one of the members of the original Three Caballeros, along with the ancestors of José Carioca and Panchito Pistoles.

=== Seth Duck ===
Seth Duck was an ancestor of Donald's, considered a hero after warning Duckburg of an impending Native American attack. His statue exists in Duckburg's Park. He appeared in the 1967 comic The Clock Plot by Vic Lockman and Tony Strobl.

== First generation ==
=== Humperdink Duck ===
Humperdink Duck is the earliest known contemporary Duck family member. He is the husband of Elvira Coot, known to the family as "Grandma Duck", and the father of Quackmore (Donald's father), Eider, and Daphne Duck (Gladstone's mother). Humperdink is father-in-law to Scrooge's sister Hortense (Donald's mother) who married his son Quackmore. He is Donald's paternal grandfather and the maternal great-grandfather of Huey, Dewey, and Louie, through their mother Della (Donald's twin sister). Humperdink worked as a farmer in rural Duckburg. Don Rosa gave the character relevant appearances in two stories, "The Invader Of Fort Duckburg", a chapter of the saga The Life and Times of Scrooge McDuck, and "The Sign Of The Triple Distelfink". In the family, he was known as "Pa Duck", and later as "Grandpa Duck".

Humperdink's life before having a family was never shown in the comics. Don Rosa speculated that the Duck family originated from England, but it is unknown if Humperdink is an immigrant.

In the story "The Good Old Daze" by Tony Strobl, Grandpa Duck (an older Humperdink) appears in a flashback scene taking care of little Donald along with Grandma, where he is portrayed as a dedicated but rigorous grandfather. Grandpa Duck's real name was not revealed in this story, but in an untitled story from 1951, an old lover of Grandma called Humperdink has a cameo appearance. Don Rosa considered that this character became Donald's paternal grandfather. In "The Good Old Daze", artist Tony Strobl drew Grandpa Duck with a long beard and some hair, while Rosa has depicted him with a short beard and a full head of hair. In the Danish story The Good Neighbors (part of the series, Tamers of Nonhuman Threats), by writer Lars Jensen and artist Flemming Andersen, Strobl's version of Grandpa Duck appears in a flashback scene that is told by his wife Grandma Duck. He also appears unnamed in the 1955 film No Hunting, in which he posthumously inspires Donald to take part in hunting season.

=== Grandma Duck ===
Elvira "Grandma" Duck (née Coot, October c. 1855) is Donald's paternal grandmother and the Duck family matriarch. In most stories, she is simply referred to as "Grandma Duck". She was introduced to the Disney comic universe by Al Taliaferro and Bob Karp in the Donald Duck newspaper comic strip, first in a picture on the wall in the August 11, 1940, Sunday page, and then as a full-fledged character in the strip on Monday, September 27, 1943. Taliaferro found inspiration for her in his own mother-in-law, Donnie M. Wheaton. Depending on the writer, Grandma Duck has had various given names over the years. In a story by Riley Thomson from 1950, she was named "Elviry" and in a story from 1953 she was given the name "Abigail". Don Rosa later gave her the name "Elvira" in his comic books series The Life and Times of Scrooge McDuck.

According to artist/writer Don Rosa, Grandma was born around 1855. In the comic strips by Taliaferro and Karp, it is mentioned that in her youth she was a pioneer in the American migration to the west, riding a covered wagon and participating in many Indian Wars. Later, she married Humperdink Duck, and they had three children named Quackmore (Donald's father), Daphne (Gladstone's mother) and Eider (Fethry's father in the non-Barks duck universe). Grandma Duck helped to raise her great-grandsons, Huey, Dewey, and Louie Duck (her daughter-in-law Hortense's grandsons and granddaughter Della's sons). In most comic book stories, as well as other media that handles Donald Duck's childhood, it was Grandma Duck who filled the role of Donald's caretaker.

Grandma made her animated debut in the 1960 Wonderful World of Color episode This is Your Life, Donald Duck, where she was voiced by June Foray. The episode depicted her great difficulty in raising Donald, a strong-willed and ill-tempered duckling from the moment he was hatched. She also made a brief appearance in Sport Goofy in Soccermania she was now voiced by Russi Taylor, a non-speaking cameo in Mickey's Christmas Carol, and can be spotted in the background of the DuckTales episode Horse Scents.

== Second generation ==
=== Quackmore Duck ===
Quackmore Duck (born 1875) is the father of Donald Duck, and has been variously depicted with or without a moustache. His parents are Humperdink and Elvira "Grandma" Duck. He was born in Duckburg, and from an early age displayed a heavy temper. He worked at his parents' farm until 1902 when he met Hortense McDuck and they became engaged. He started working for her brother Scrooge McDuck.

By 1908, he was helping Hortense and her sister Matilda McDuck run their brother's empire as Scrooge's chief accountant, mainly because Scrooge thought that as a possible heir, he would be motivated to work hard and stay honest. In 1920, he married Hortense and within the year became the father of twins: Donald and Della. The couple became parents when they already were more than 40 years old, according to Don Rosa.

Quackmore's image is visible in several photographs in the DuckTales reboot premiere, Woo-oo!, and is also mentioned by name in the episode by Webby Vanderquack.

=== Hortense McDuck ===
Hortense Duck (née McDuck; born 1876) is married to Quackmore Duck. She is also Donald's mother, Humperdink and Elvira's daughter-in-law, Daphne and Eider's sister-in-law, and Huey, Dewey, and Louie's maternal grandmother. She was born in Scotland and is the youngest sister of Scrooge McDuck.

=== Daphne Duck ===
Daphne Gander (née Duck) is Donald's paternal aunt, Hortense's sister-in-law, Huey, Dewey, and Louie's maternal grand-aunt, and the mother of Gladstone Gander. In the story "The Sign of The Triple Distelfink" (1998), Don Rosa explains that Gladestone's good luck was inherited from his mother, after a traveling worker painted a giant sign of the "Triple Distelfink" on her parents' stable on the day of her birth. The symbol was supposed to bring the baby luck, and it did: Daphne was always incredibly lucky. She worked in her parents' farm until at least 1902. Later, she stopped working and started living on the things she won in contests. She married Goostave Gander, and in 1920 became the mother of Gladstone Gander. Gladstone was born on her birthday and under the protection of the same symbol as his mother.

=== Eider Duck ===
Eider Duck is Donald's paternal uncle, Hortense's brother-in-law, and Huey, Dewey, and Louie's maternal grand-uncle. He was first mentioned in August 1944 in the story "The Fighting Falcon" by Carl Barks. In this story, Donald receives a falcon called Farragut as a present by his Uncle Eider who does not live in Duckburg. Farragut arrives inside a big box brought to Donald's house by an expressman. Barks never mentioned Eider again but Don Rosa decided to include him in his Duck Family Tree.

According to Rosa, Eider is the son of Humperdink and Elvira Duck and the father of Abner and Fethry Duck. As of 1902, he worked on his parents' farm. He later married Lulubelle Loon and became the father of at least two sons, Abner "Whitewater" Duck and Fethry Duck.

=== Lulubelle Loon ===
Lulubelle Duck (née Loon) is married to Eider Duck and the mother of Abner and Fethry Duck, according to Don Rosa's version of the Duck family tree. She does not have any comic appearance so far, not even a cameo one.

=== Sheriff Dan Duck ===
Sheriff Dan Duck (aka Cousin Dan) is an old cousin of Donald who happens to be sheriff of a Western town called Bent Spur Gulch. Dan originally has thick, dark-grey eyebrows, a long, dark-grey mustache and long, dark-grey hair on the left and right sides of his head. He is generally shown holding a crutch. He appeared in two comic stories, "Daredevil Deputy" by Jack Bradbury, where he asks Donald to replace him while he recovers from "a touch of rheumatism", and "Trigger Gulch Gang" by Tony Strobl, where he has only a brief appearance on the first page.

A remake of "Daredevil Deputy" was drawn by Chilean cartoonist Vicar for the Danish publisher Egmont. It's called "Sheriff for a Day", first published in 1978.

== Third generation ==
=== Donald Duck ===
Donald Duck (born June 9, c. 1920) is the ill-tempered but good-hearted son of Quackmore and Hortense Duck, and the most well-known member of the family. He is the nephew of Scrooge McDuck, the twin brother of Della Duck, and the uncle of her triplet sons Huey, Dewey, and Louie Duck. His girlfriend is Daisy Duck. He does not have any children of his own, but is the legal guardian of his nephews, as seen for example in the 1942 film The New Spirit in which Donald lists the boys as dependants on his income tax form. In the 1959 cartoon How to Have an Accident at Work Donald and Daisy have an unnamed toddler son.

=== Della Duck ===
Della Duck (called Dumbella in Donald's Nephews; born June 9, c. 1920) is the mother of Huey, Dewey, and Louie Duck, the younger twin sister of their uncle Donald Duck, and the niece of their grand-uncle Scrooge McDuck. She was first described as Donald Duck's cousin, but was later referred to as Donald's twin sister. She was first mentioned in a 1937 Donald Duck Sunday strip on October 17, 1937, in which she writes a letter explaining to Donald that she is sending her sons to stay with him.

Della made her first animated appearance in DuckTales (2017), with her sons discovering she was previously a companion of Scrooge and Donald's in their adventures. Dewey and his brothers set out to investigate the cause of her disappearance along with Webby Vanderquack. In the Christmas episode, "Last Christmas", it is revealed that as kids, Donald used to insult Della by calling her "Dumbella", a reference to her name in Donald's Nephews. She is voiced by Paget Brewster.

=== Huey, Dewey, and Louie's father ===
The identity of Huey, Dewey, and Louie's father is something of a mystery. The character does not appear in any stories, but he did partially appear in the 1993 Duck family tree drawn by Don Rosa. In this illustration, Rosa partially concealed the character's face with a bird. While his first name was also hidden, his last name is revealed to be Duck. His face was fully shown in the unofficial Duck family tree by Mark Worden and first published in several fanzines, which labeled him "? Duck" and showed him with a flattop haircut and human-like ears.

In Huey, Dewey, and Louie's first appearance in a 1937 Donald Duck Sunday strip, Della writes to Donald that the boys had placed a firecracker under their father's chair as a prank and that their father had been sent to the hospital. This was the reason why the boys first showed up at Donald's house. The father has not been mentioned again in the chronicles. In "The Richest Duck in the World", when Scrooge mentions that the few family members he had had disappeared, the boys respond, "We know how that feels!"

=== Fethry Duck ===
Donald's cousin Fethry Duck was created for the non-US market by Disney Studio Program employees Dick Kinney (writer) and Al Hubbard (artist) and was first featured in the story "The Health Nut", published on August 2, 1964. Kinney and Hubbard created Fethry to be a beatnik member of the Duck family (the definition being "a person who rejects or avoids conventional behavior"). Fethry quickly adopts new hobbies and lifestyles and eagerly pursues the latest fads and trends, causing chaos for friends and family in the process. In his first story, Fethry is introduced as moving to Duckburg and having a prior acquaintance with Donald, who is already aware of Fethry's obsessive tendency. Fethry wears a stocking cap, for reasons revealed in "The Health Nut": he was convinced by a self-help book author that one's head is healthier when it's kept hot. Fethry's trademark sweater, usually bearing a black stripe, is typically a different color depending on which country the story is published in.

Only three stories with Fethry initially appeared in the United States (Donald Duck #105–106 and Walt Disney's Comics and Stories #304). Later, some of the Fethry Studio Program stories were reprinted in the Wonderful World of Disney giveaway magazine published in 1969–1970 for Gulf Oil. However, the character became popular in foreign markets; in Europe, Fethry has appeared in numerous Italian-produced comics and in Brazil, the character had his own comic book title during the 1980s which lasted 56 issues. Hubbard and Kinney developed more than fifty comic stories with Fethry. The vast majority were published in English in Australia between 1964 and 1969, often in one-shot comics billed Donald and Fethry Duck—suggesting a comedic duo—or simply Fethry Duck.

Since Fethry was not created by Carl Barks and was never used in any of Barks' stories, popular American artist/writer Don Rosa does not consider Fethry part of the Duck family. However, due to editorial pressure from supervisor Byron Erickson at the helm of Egmont, Rosa reluctantly included him in his Duck Family Tree. According to the resulting diagram, Fethry is the son of Eider Duck and Lulubelle Loon, the cousin of Donald Duck and the brother of Abner "Whitewater" Duck (from Barks' 1962 story, Log Jockey).

Fethry also works with Donald for Scrooge McDuck's secret organization, originally called the P.I.A. (in Italian), as an assistant of the detective Umperio Bogarto (in 1996) and as Moby Duck's First Mate (in the early 2000s). Donald has often teamed up with Fethry to work for Scrooge (usually with disastrous results), with Donald being the "straight man" and Fethry the "funny man", although Donald's reactions to Fethry and attempts to neutralize him are often as humorous as Fethry's mishaps. In 1970s stories drawn by Tony Strobl, Fethry is the owner of a hyper-friendly dog named Poochie. Several Brazilian stories also featured Fethry's pet.

Since the early 1970s, Fethry has occasionally donned superhero garb as the Red Bat (Portuguese: Morcego Vermelho) in Brazilian Disney comics. The Red Bat was created by artist Carlos Edgar Herrero and writer Ivan Saidenberg.

In 2018, Fethry made his first animated appearance in the DuckTales episode "The Depths of Cousin Fethry!", voiced by Tom Kenny. He is depicted as the caretaker of one of Scrooge's undersea research facilities that Huey and Dewey visit. While they are at first put off by his odd behavior, the two come to respect Fethry after he protects them from a sea monster. He later returns in "Moonvasion" to help protect the Earth from the invading Moonlanders and in "The Last Adventure!" to attend Webby Vanderquack's birthday party.

=== Whitewater Duck ===
Whitewater Duck was created by Carl Barks and used by him only in the story "Log Jockey", published in Walt Disney's Comics and Stories #267 in December 1962. According to that story, he is a distant cousin of Donald and Huey, Dewey, and Louie, and works as a lumberjack in the woods.

Don Rosa's Duck Family Tree states that Whitewater's real name is Abner, and "Whitewater" is a nickname. He is also shown to be a son of Eider Duck and Lulubelle Loon and Fethry Duck's brother, making him Donald's first cousin.

=== Dudly D. Duck ===
Dudly D. Duck is a cousin of Donald who appears in the comic story "Why All the Crabby Ducks?" by Vic Lockman and Mike Arens. He is a flopped architect and inventor who was responsible for the construction of the "Jog Tunnel", which annoys the citizens of Duckburg because it really has a jog in it, and for the bad planning of Duckburg's streets. Therefore, Dudly became very unpopular and was forced to live isolated in a lonely street, including his name was forgotten until the day that Donald discovers who planned the "Jog Tunnel", and then his girlfriend Daisy Duck reveals who is Dudly Duck through the newspaper where she works as reporter. A reporter rival of Daisy ends up discovering that Dudly is related to Donald, who in turn becomes unpopular too.

=== Dimwitty Duck ===
Dimwitty Duck (originally just called Dim-Witty) is a duck who was introduced in the comic story "The Vanishing Banister", where he appears as an assistant of Donald Duck, who in turn appears working as a private detective. Daisy Duck has a brief appearance in the beginning of this one. But there are some old American stories with Dimwitty and Daisy where Donald does not appear. In the story "On Disappearing Island", Dimwitty appeared for the first time as Moby's ship hand and from then on he became the most common supporting character in Moby's stories. Dimwitty is incredibly clumsy but he is loyal and subservient, and maybe that's the reason why Moby keeps him as his ship hand. But a close kinship between them could also explain this fact. Dimwitty is taller than Donald and Moby. In some 1970s stories, Dimwitty was shown as a friend of Gus Goose.

There are some old stories where it's revealed that Dimwitty's surname is also "Duck". The first one was "The Fix-it-fiasco", which also features Daisy.

Just like Moby, Dimwitty had also a cameo appearance in the Darkwing Duck / Ducktales crossover called "Dangerous Currency" from 2011.

=== Moby Duck ===
Moby Duck, whose name is a spoof of the novel Moby-Dick, was created by writer Vic Lockman and illustrator Tony Strobl in the comic-book story "A Whale of an Adventure" in Donald Duck #112 (March 1967). He made his only major animated appearance in the Walt Disney's Wonderful World of Color episode "Pacifically Peeking" (October 6, 1968), and had a cameo appearance in the episode "House of Crime" of the House of Mouse TV series. He first appeared in Donald Duck #112 where he is seen saving Donald from drowning at sea, after Donald was forced to accept Moby's proposal to work as his helper, since Moby's porpoise Porpy pretended to be a threatening shark. Later that year Moby got his own comic book title which ran 11 issues until 1970, and then from 1973 to 1978 (issues #12-30). Illustrators of American Moby Duck stories include Strobl, Kay Wright, and Pete Alvarado. Not seen in the US for two decades, he was used in a comic subseries produced in Italy during the 2000s. Moby had two cameo appearances in the 2010s: the first one was in an Italian story from 2010, and the second one was in the Darkwing Duck / Ducktales crossover called "Dangerous Currency" from 2011.

Moby is a relative of Donald Duck as seen in "Sea Dog's Holiday" by Vic Lockman and Kay Wright. There are American old stories where Moby seems to be familiar to other members of Donald's paternal family as well, like Grandma Duck and Gladstone Gander. In the comic story "The Dread Sea Adventure" by Lockman and Wright, Grandma exclaims when she sees Moby, "Moby Duck, you salty old sea biscuit!", making it clear that she knows him very well.

== Fourth generation ==
=== Huey, Dewey, and Louie Duck ===
Huey, Dewey, and Louie Duck (born c. 1940, according to Don Rosa) are Donald's three nephews, grand-nephews of his uncle Scrooge McDuck and identical triplet sons of Della Duck.

=== Dugan Duck ===
Dugan Duck is Fethry Duck's nephew who is a little bit younger than Huey, Dewey, and Louie. According to the Brazilian comic story "O Nascimento Do Biquinho", he is the son of Fethry's sister, who lives in the periphery of Duckburg. His English name is a reference to The Yellow Kid, Mickey Dugan.

== Coot kin ==
The Coot family, typically called the Coot kin in stories, are the relatives of Grandma Duck and, along with the Clan McDuck, constitute the third major branch of Donald's family tree. The name "Coot" was used by several comic authors including Carl Barks, but Don Rosa was the first to show their relationship to Donald. The members of the family are depicted as white Pekin ducks like Donald, although real-life coots are typically black.

=== Cornelius Coot ===
Cornelius Coot (1790–1880) founded Duckburg (and the real-world, but since closed Mickey's Toontown Fair at the Magic Kingdom). He first appeared as a statue in Walt Disney's Comics and Stories #138 in the 1952 story "Statuesque Spendthrifts" by Carl Barks. His statue and legacy has later appeared in many other stories. Although Cornelius was a well-known figure to readers of Disney comics, his character history was not told until Don Rosa began using the character in the late 1980s. The following history is mainly based on Rosa's stories, especially "His Majesty, McDuck", first published in Uncle Scrooge Adventures #14.

A statue of Cornelius holding an ear of corn is present in Mickey's Toontown Fair in Walt Disney World's Magic Kingdom. Before 1996, the land was known as Mickey's Birthdayland/Starland, and was set in the city of Duckburg.

Cornelius Coot made his first television appearance in the DuckTales episode, "The Golden Armory of Cornelius Coot". The episode retells the story of Coot's founding of Duckburg, though the Spanish are replaced by Beagles in the story. Huey, Dewey, Louie, and Webby explore the catacombs under Fort Duckburg in search of his treasure, discovering a series of giant popcorn makers that Coot used to imitate the sound of gunfire and scare the Beagles into retreating.

=== Clinton Coot ===
Clinton Coot (1830-1910) was first mentioned in Uncle Scrooge Adventures #27 in the story "Guardians of the Lost Library", first published in July, 1994. There he was introduced as the son of Cornelius Coot and the founder of The Junior Woodchucks, inspired by the book given to him by his father.

In The Life and Times of Scrooge McDuck it is revealed that he is the father of Grandma Duck. In Don Rosa's Duck Family Tree, Clinton is married to Gertrude Gadwall and their two children are Grandma Duck (Elvira Coot) and Casey Coot.

He is named after Bill Clinton, who was running for President of the United States when Don Rosa created the character.

Clinton makes his animated debut in the 2018 TV show Legend of the Three Caballeros, voiced by Thomas Lennon. In the series, Clinton was an archaeologist obsessed with his ancestor Don Dugo and his adventuring companions, who were the original Three Caballeros. He founded the New Quackmore Institute near the site of one of their headquarters, building a cabana over the base itself, but his business partner Baroness Von Sheldgoose would seize control over the rest of the land the campus sat on. After his death, he arranged for the cabana to be left to his great-grandson Donald and the descendants of the other two Caballeros, Panchito Pistoles and José Carioca.

=== Gertrude Gadwall ===
Gertrude Coot (née Gadwall) is married to Clinton Coot and the mother of Casey and Elvira Coot ("Grandma Duck"). Like Lulubelle Loon, Gertrude has appeared only in Don Rosa's version of the Duck family tree.

=== Casey Coot ===
Casey Coot (born 1860) first appeared in "Last Sled to Dawson", first published in June, 1988. He is introduced as an unsuccessful gold prospector and friend of Scrooge McDuck during his years in Klondike. In need of money he sold to the significantly more successful Scrooge McDuck his share in Duckburg, Calisota, USA. His share included "Killmule Hill" which, renamed to "Killmotor Hill", comprises the land where Scrooge's money bin stands. He later appeared in The Life and Times of Scrooge McDuck Part 8 and Hearts of the Yukon. In The Life and Times of Scrooge McDuck Part 10 it is revealed that he and Grandma Duck are brother and sister.

In Don Rosa's Duck Family Tree he is featured as a grandson of Cornelius Coot, a son of Clinton Coot and Gertrude Gadwall. He married Gretchen Grebe and they had at least two kids named Fanny and Cuthbert Coot, being the maternal grandfather of Fanny's son Gus Goose.

=== Gretchen Grebe ===
Gretchen Coot (née Grebe) is married to Casey Coot, the mother of Cuthbert and Fanny Coot, and the maternal grandmother of Gus Goose.

=== Fanny Coot ===
Fanny Coot is the mother of Donald's cousin Gus Goose, and paternal aunt of Donald; she was first mentioned in the Donald Duck comic strip of May 9, 1938 by Bob Karp & Al Taliaferro where Gus first appeared. Gus's mother's surname was not revealed in this comic strip, where she identifies herself in a letter to Donald as "Aunt Fanny". In Don Rosa's Duck Family Tree she is featured as a daughter of Casey Coot and his wife Gretchen Grebe, and so a niece of Elvira Coot, Donald's paternal grandmother, and first cousin of Donald's father, Quackmore Duck. Fanny also had a brother named Cuthbert Coot and she married Luke Goose, and then became the mother of Gus Goose.

=== Cuthbert Coot ===
Cuthbert Coot was introduced in the story "Webfooted Wrangler," first published in April 1945, as a distant cousin of Donald Duck and a rancher. In Don Rosa's Duck family tree he is included as a member of the Coot Kin as son of Casey Coot and Gretchen Grebe.

=== Kildare Coot ===
Kildare Coot was introduced by Italian artist Romano Scarpa as a highly eccentric fourth cousin of Donald Duck in the story "Sgrizzo, il papero più balzano del mondo" (roughly translated as "Kildare Coot, the weirdest duck in the world"), first published on October 25, 1964. Though his exact relationship to Donald remains uncertain his last name suggests he belongs to the Coot Kin and that he is related to Donald through Elvira Coot, Donald's paternal grandmother. Curiously, Kildare usually treats Gideon McDuck, Scrooge's half-brother, as his uncle. He calls Gideon 'Zio', which means uncle in Italian. Kildare and his fellow Andy Ascott (original Italian name) appear as reporters of Gideon's newspaper, The Cricket, in some Italian stories.

== Goose family ==
=== Luke Goose ===
Luke Goose (sometimes called Luke the Goose) is the father of Donald's cousin Gus Goose. He was originally supposed to be Gladstone Gander's father, Daphne Duck's husband and Gus's uncle, but Carl Barks later changed his mind, making Goostave Gander (who was originally Gladstone's adoptive father after Luke and Daphne "overate at a free-lunch picnic") Gladstone's biological father and Daphne's husband. Luke the Goose disappeared from the tree.

When Don Rosa created his Duck Family Tree, he used Luke Goose (removing "the" from his name) and made him the husband of Fanny Coot and Gus Goose's father.

=== Gus Goose ===
Gustav "Gus" Goose is Donald Duck's paternal second cousin, and the great-nephew of Grandma Duck. He debuted on May 9, 1938, in Al Taliaferro and Bob Karp's Donald Duck comic strip, before making an animated appearance in the 1939 short Donald's Cousin Gus. Because the animation studio took much longer to produce a film and worked with a schedule much farther ahead than the comic strip, Gus, like Donald's nephews Huey, Dewey, and Louie "first saw the light of day" in the animation department, with the comic strip being based on the film that was in-the-works. Gus's main personality traits are laziness and gluttony.

Within Disney comics, Gus is usually shown living as a farmhand on Grandma Duck's farm outside of Duckburg. Along with his gluttony, Gus is quite lazy, often doing little if any work on Grandma's farm. He also has a tendency of falling asleep at random occasions, sometimes even standing up. On occasion Gus has even shown signs of ingenuity as to finding methods or solutions to make his chores much easier for him and at times even automating them so he does not have to work at all.

Gus made no appearances in DuckTales, but there is a background character in the series, Vacation Van Honk, who looks similar to him.

Gus appeared in the 2000s animated series Disney's House of Mouse, as the club's gluttonous chef, speaking only in honks rather than words. He also made non-speaking cameo appearances in both Mickey's Christmas Carol and Who Framed Roger Rabbit.

The friend and neighbor Gustav Goose from Quack Pack is probably not the same as Cousin Gus since there are very few similarities (aside from the name and general size of the character). Some confusion is also caused by the German comicbook version of Gladstone Gander being referred to as "Gustav Gans" ("Gustav Goose").

In Danish comic book stories, Gus Goose has appeared as the boyfriend of a classy and rich anthropomorphic swan named Cissy Swann. In Italy, a nephew of him named Pepper appeared in two stories.

== Gander family ==
=== Goostave Gander ===
Goostave Gander is Gladstone Gander's father. In some early stories he is married to Matilda McDuck, Scrooge's sister and adopted Gladstone, but Carl Barks later had him married to Daphne Duck instead. They are considered the parents of Gladstone Gander; although his wife and son's luck does not include him. "Us Ganders have never sunk low enough to associate with you Ducks!", exclaimed Gladstone to Donald in "Race to the South Seas" by Carl Barks, suggesting that there is a mutual antipathy between his father's family and his mother's. In this same story, Gladstone exclaims, "Us Ganders have never worked!", what suggests that originally Gladstone's luck came from his father's side.

=== Gladstone Gander ===
Gladstone Gander is a Walt Disney fictional character created in 1948 by comic artist and writer Carl Barks. He is an anthropomorphic male goose (or gander) who possess exceptional good luck that grants him anything he desires as well as protecting from any harm. This is in contrast to his cousin Donald Duck who is often characterized for having bad luck. Gladstone is also a rival of Donald for the affection of Daisy Duck.

=== Shamrock Gander ===
Shamrock Gander is Gladstone's nephew. Shamrock first appeared in a story printed in Duck Album Four Color #649 where he was shown to be as lucky as his uncle Gladstone. He has only been used a few times since; one example is a Brazilian comic story where he competes with Huey, Dewey, and Louie.

== See also ==
- Donald Duck, Daisy Duck, Huey, Dewey, and Louie and Scrooge McDuck
- Clan McDuck / Ludwig Von Drake / List of Donald Duck universe characters
- Donald Duck universe / Donald Duck in comics / Disney comics
- Mickey Mouse universe / List of fictional ducks
- Magica De Spell (character)
