= The Old Castle's Other Secret or A Letter from Home =

2004 Scrooge McDuck comic

"The Old Castle's Other Secret"
- Original cover for the story. Art by Don Rosa.
- Story code: D 2003-081
- Story: Don Rosa
- Ink: Don Rosa
- Hero: Scrooge McDuck
- Pages: 34
- Layout: 4 rows per page
- Appearances: Scrooge McDuck; Donald Duck; Huey, Dewey and Louie; Matilda McDuck; Mister Molay; Maurice Matressface
- First publication: February 20, 2004

"The Old Castle's Other Secret", alternately titled "A Letter from Home", is Don Rosa's 2004 sequel to "The Crown of the Crusader Kings". The title is a reference to "The Old Castle's Secret", which was the second story to feature Scrooge McDuck and was the first in which he was a starring character in an adventure with his nephews.

The story was first published in the Danish Anders And & Co. #2004-09; the first American publication was in Uncle Scrooge #342, in June 2005.

== Plot ==
Scrooge McDuck and his family return to Castle McDuck, in Scotland, to find the treasure of the Knights Templar, after uncovering evidence in the previous story that a McDuck ancestor, Sir Simon McDuck, was appointed its treasurer.

The Castle's recently-hired caretaker is revealed to be Matilda McDuck, Scrooge's sister (and Donald's aunt and Huey, Dewey, and Louie's great-aunt) who has not spoken to her brother for nearly 25 years. Donald purposely did not tell Matilda they were coming, hoping to effect a reconciliation between her and Scrooge, but Matilda refuses to believe Scrooge is sincere and thinks he is only interested in the treasure. She reveals that the McDuck family has always known about it, but it was their father Fergus's wish that Scrooge not be told. Matilda believes that Fergus knew his son was becoming too greedy for his own good, and Scrooge, who never heard from his father before the latter's death, secretly fears she might be right.

Scrooge, despite being hurt and depressed, nevertheless keeps searching for the treasure. However, he is being shadowed by Mr. Molay and a reluctant Maurice Mattressface of the International Money Council (the modern successors to the Templars). Molay has stolen the Crown of the Crusader Kings from its museum in Haiti, knowing it is the key to finding the treasure. Following a series of clues leads Scrooge and his nephews to a vault underneath the Castle, sealed with an elaborate combination lock.

Mattressface rebels against Molay, who reveals himself as a member of the villainous Priory of Sion. Taking Matilda as a hostage, he confronts Scrooge and his nephews and forces them to use the key inside the crown to open the vault, but Scrooge jumps into the path of Molay's gun to protect Matilda, while Donald knocks Molay out by breaking the Holy Grail over his head.

The treasure is found, but Scrooge agrees with Mattressface that it was given to his family to safeguard, not to keep, and Mattressface promises that it will be gradually dispensed to a number of worthy causes. Matilda confronts her brother, asking him if he acted in defense of her, or if the treasure was all he ever cared about. Scrooge admits that the reason he never tried to make peace with her was because he was ashamed of his actions from the last time they talked, and that his ideals hadn't stood up to his travels from building his financial empire, and his vast wealth went from being a memento of his hard work and adventurousness, to becoming simply money. Scrooge also confesses that he envies Donald for having a family, but the McDuck spirit of adventure he sees in his younger relatives has inspired him to return to a life of adventure ever since he first met them. Scrooge begs his sister's forgiveness, and, seeing that he has always cared for his family, Matilda makes up with him at last.

Scrooge laments that he may have earned her forgiveness, but he will never know how his father felt about him. But during the fight at the vault entrance, a small box fell from one of the statues, inside which is a letter from Fergus to his son. Fergus writes that after his wife's death, he followed the same clues to the vault's location, but was unable to get inside without the final key (the Crown). Instead, he left the letter, confident that Scrooge would find his own way there one day, and confessing that the real reason he never told Scrooge about the treasure was because he recognized his son's integrity and adventurousness, and knew he would be much more satisfied earning his fortune instead of simply inheriting one. Fergus ends by affirming that he (and his wife) were always proud of Scrooge and his accomplishments.

Matilda admits that Fergus's opinion of Scrooge was the right one all along, but asks if Scrooge regrets leaving home to seek his fortune, not knowing until now that there was one hidden right under his ancestral home. Scrooge replies, not in the slightest: he would not have traded his lifetime of adventure for anything in the world, as it brought him his fortune, his family, and most important of all, the chance to prove that he was the man his father always believed him to be.

== Production ==
Don Rosa wanted to use both Matilda and Donald Duck's mother Hortense in A Letter from Home, but his editor (Egmont) did not want Donald's mother to be used in a present-day story, so Rosa only used Matilda.

== See also ==
- "The Old Castle's Other Secret" served as the title story to Fantagraphics' Uncle Scrooge and Donald Duck: The Don Rosa Library Vol. 10.
