= Della Duck =

Disney cartoon character

- Donald Duck character
- Della Duck in the DuckTales reboot
- First appearance: In print: Donald Duck Sunday strip on October 17, 1937 (name only); Donald Duck Family Tree by Carl Barks (1990; as Thelma Duck) (picture); Donald Duck Family Tree by Don Rosa (1993; as Della Duck) (picture); The Empire-Builder from Calisota (1994); In animation: Donald's Nephews (1938) (name only); DuckTales (2017)
- Created by: Al Taliaferro and Ted Osborne
- Voiced by: Paget Brewster (2018–2021)

In-universe information
- Aliases: Dumbella Duck; Thelma Duck
- Species: American Pekin Duck
- Gender: Female
- Family: Duck family Clan McDuck
- Spouse: Mr. Duck
- Children: Huey Duck; Dewey Duck; Louie Duck
- Relatives: Quackmore Duck (father); Hortense McDuck (mother); Donald Duck (older twin brother); Scrooge McDuck (maternal uncle); Ludwig Von Drake (uncle); Gladstone Gander (first cousin); Gus Goose (second cousin)
- Nationality: American

Della Duck (sometimes named Dumbella Duck) is a character from the Donald Duck universe, created in 1937 by Al Taliaferro and Ted Osborne. She is a core member of the Disney Duck family, as the niece of Scrooge McDuck, the younger twin sister of Donald Duck and the mother of his nephews Huey, Dewey, and Louie. Della is an anthropomorphic white duck with a yellow-orange bill, legs, and feet.

She is one of the main characters in the DuckTales reboot, where Paget Brewster voices her. Della typically wears an aviator hat, bomber jacket with a light blue scarf and brown shorts or pants. As an adult, being an amputee, she also has a robot leg. Della has received positive reviews, with critics praising her buoyant energy and Brewster's performance. She is known for her boisterous and adventurous spirit as a female adventurer, and has been deemed a positive role model to other women and to people with disabilities. Della is often considered the breakout character of the reboot.

== History ==
Della Duck was first mentioned in Donald Duck comic strips in 1937 as "Cousin Della". The second time, and first mention on screen, was in the animated short Donald's Nephews (1938) as "Sister Dumbella". Prior to her animation debut in the 2017 DuckTales reboot, Della never appeared in any animated film or television series, and had only limited appearances in Disney comics. As a result, almost nothing was known about the character prior to 2017.

=== Beginnings of the character ===
Della was first mentioned in a 1937 Donald Duck Sunday strip on October 17, 1937, in which she writes a letter explaining to Donald that she is sending her sons to stay with him. This first appearance referred to Della as Donald's cousin, though later depictions would refer to her as Donald's sister. One year later, Della was mentioned in similar fashion in Donald Duck's 1938 short film Donald's Nephews. This cartoon, which marked the film debut of Della's three sons (and Donald's nephews), Huey, Dewey, and Louie Duck, opened with Donald receiving a postcard from his sister (addressed "Dear Brother" and signed "Sister Dumbella"), letting him know that the three boys are coming to visit him.

In a 1990 Duck family tree by Carl Barks, Donald's sister appears as "Thelma Duck".

Della Duck in the Donald Duck Family Tree by Don Rosa

In the 1993 Duck family tree by Don Rosa, she was renamed "Della". Rosa later included her in the mid-1990s series The Life and Times of Scrooge McDuck, in the story The Empire-Builder from Calisota (1994), in which she and Donald wore identical sailor suits in their childhood.

Her first appearance in comics as an adult was in a 2014 Dutch-language Donald Duck comic, 80 is Prachtig!, created to celebrate Donald's 80th birthday. In this comic, Donald finally tells the nephews the story of their mother, depicting her in flashbacks; Della is depicted as a successful test pilot, the first woman to fly across the Atlantic Ocean, and stranded in space after test-flying a rocket ship that accidentally propelled her to near light speed.

=== Youth in Dutch comics (2017) ===
During 2017, Della appeared every month in the Dutch Donald Duck comic strips, appearing in a total of 22 stories, starting with "Donalds eerste schaatsles" ("Donald's First Skating Lesson"), published in January, to "Donalds eerste skiles" ("Donald's First Skiing Lesson"), published in December. The stories featuring Della focused mainly on her childhood with Donald, with the exception of two stories published in March, "Donalds eerste liedje" ("Donald's First Song") and "Donalds eerste afspraakje" ("Donald's First Date"), which showed them closer to adolescence. Subsequently, Della reappeared in June 2019 in the story "Haring met roomijs" ("Herring and Ice Cream") from the Donnie Duck comics, centered on Donald's childhood.

=== DuckTales (2017–2021) ===
Della plays a prominent, although initially off-screen, role in the 2017 reboot of DuckTales. As the mother of the main characters, Huey, Dewey, and Louie, she is revealed during the first season to be a skilled pilot and fearless adventuring partner of her uncle Scrooge McDuck and twin brother Donald. Della is first depicted in the series at the end of the pilot episode, in a painting discovered by the triplets. Dewey notices what looks like Della in one corner of the painting, shown fighting pirates alongside Scrooge and Donald. This discovery triggers a search, first by Dewey and Webby Vanderquack before eventually involving all three triplets, for information about their mother and her disappearance; forming the central mystery of the show's first season.

The first appearance of Della as an adult in the United States was in November 2017, in a series of flashback stories in issues #2 and #3 of the IDW DuckTales comics, a tie-in to the reboot series. Della was depicted for the first time in animation, again in flashbacks, in the DuckTales season 1 episode "The Last Crash of the Sunchaser!", which revealed the story of Della Duck to Huey, Dewey, and Louie: Della discovered a prototype rocket ship Scrooge was building as a gift for her, took it on an unauthorized launch, and got caught in a cosmic storm. Della was presumed lost to the cosmic abyss after Scrooge launched a massive and expensive rescue operation, but ultimately failed in his attempt to find her.

On August 18, 2018, in the DuckTales season 1 finale ("The Shadow War!"), Della was depicted for the first time in a speaking role, revealed to have survived the cosmic storm and still living in the remains of her rocket ship. Della Duck has recurring appearances in season 2 of the series, beginning with the episode "Last Christmas!", a time travel episode which depicts younger versions of Della and Donald. In this episode, Donald calls his sister "Dumbella" at one point, meant as an insult but also a reference to Della's alternate name from the 1930s.

In February 2019, Disney began promoting, as a special event, the premiere of the first episode of DuckTales to focus on Della. The episode promised to fully reveal what happened to the character for the first time since she was lost in space. The episode, titled "What Ever Happened to Della Duck?!", aired on March 9, 2019. Describing the episode as "thrilling, tragic, powerful, and defining." The A.V. Club wrote that it "gets to the heart of Della as a character even before the title appears on screen." Entertainment Weekly included the episode on its end-of-year list of the 30 best television episodes of 2019, praising the reveal of Della Duck and writing that "this whole time, DuckTales had been hiding its best character off-screen." Following this, Della was able to return to Earth in the repaired Spear of Selene, but subsequently had trouble bonding with the triplets (whose names were apparently "meant" to be Jet, Turbo and Rebel) as she has no actual experience being a mother, her attitude being more focused on attempting to bond with them as the "cool mom". The latter half of the season explored her developing role, such as encouraging Huey to explore more varied activities and grounding Louie after his latest get-rich-quick scheme to steal lost treasures from the past nearly causes a serious temporal paradox. In the season two finale, the Moon aliens Della encountered attempt to mount an invasion using technology reverse-engineered from Della's rocket, but although she tries to hide her children away, the returned Donald convinces her to join them in fighting off the invasion, leaving the alien mothership stuck in orbit between Earth and the Moon while the rest of the invasion fleet surrender.

In "What Ever Happened to Della Duck?!", it is revealed that Della was forced to amputate one of her legs due to injuries from the rocket crash, and that she built a robotic prosthetic leg as a replacement. DuckTales showrunners consulted with the Amputee Coalition on the depiction of Della as an amputee. Show producer Francisco Angones explained that it was important that Della's injury and amputation does not define her, and that rather than simply depicting her as "the amputee hero", he wanted the show to make clear that "she's a person who has a prosthetic and she's dealing with her limb loss but she's dealing with a lot of other things."

Della uses one of her brother's signature phrases, "Aw, phooey!" Like Donald, she can be hotheaded and she uses the phrase to indicate that she has given up on something she was trying to do (such as when she realizes she cannot free her leg from rocket wreckage), or after realizing things have gone horribly wrong (such as after accidentally awakening an ancient robotic foe). Reflecting her unstoppable attitude, Della also has her own signature catchphrase, "Nothing can stop Della Duck!"

=== Other appearances ===
Della (in her DuckTales version) has a cameo appearance in a Chibiverse episode "The Chibi Couple Game", being on a date with Penumbra.

== Characteristics ==
=== Voice ===
Della's first speaking appearance was in the season 1 finale of 2017's DuckTales. Paget Brewster voiced Della in the episode before joining the DuckTales cast as a recurring cast member in season 2 and a main character in season 3. Brewster told Entertainment Weekly that she really wanted the role and to be on the DuckTales cast, saying "it's very exciting to be able to be a part of the creation of [Della's] backstory, and who she is." Brewster was initially worried that, because Della is Donald Duck's twin, she might be asked to do a Donald-like voice for the character, telling Entertainment Tonight that "I could not pull it off."

Entertainment Weekly said that Brewster "makes Della Duck sound like someone generating rocket fuel with pure pep." Since voicing Della in her speaking debut, Brewster has been praised for her performance in the role; with Den of Geek writing that "the fantastic work of Paget Brewster" helped breathe "an adventurous and loving spirit into Della," while The A.V. Club wrote that Brewster was "selling Della with every passionate line-reading, making her such a perfect addition to the cast." Paget Brewster was nominated for the 2020 Daytime Emmy Award for Outstanding Performer in an Animated Program for her performance as Della Duck.

=== Personality ===
Della Duck is an extraordinary example of a strong female character, because she also is flawed. This isn't a perfect line drawing of someone; it's an interesting, deep character, and I think it gives kids the opportunity to see that you don't always have to be right, or perfect, or a superhero. You can have strengths and you can have weaknesses, and they're both of equal value if you are honest with who you are and do the best you can, and I think that Della Duck sort of embodies that.

— Paget Brewster, voice of Della Duck, Entertainment Tonight interview

Little is known of Della's personality prior to the 2017 DuckTales series. In the Dutch comic 80 is Prachtig!, Della is depicted in flashbacks as a brave and adventurous pilot. In fact, she first declared she wanted to be a pilot at the same time her brother Donald declared he wanted to be a sailor. Della's accomplishments as a pilot included being the first female pilot to fly across the Atlantic, flying as a test pilot (and successfully landing a plane that caught fire), and piloting an experimental rocket ship. She is also depicted as caring about and missing her family while she was adventuring. Due to the effects of time dilation from Della's near-lightspeed rocket travel while Huey, Dewey, and Louie lived with Donald for several years, Della believed she had been gone for less than an hour. Through radio transmissions, Della revealed she was eager to finish her test flight and get home to her boys, unaware that several more years will pass on Earth by the time she does so.

In 2017's DuckTales, Della is similarly depicted as an adventurous pilot and as a mother who cares for and loves her family, but the show also establishes that Della shares personality traits with the new series' versions of her relatives. Like her twin brother Donald, Della can be temperamental. For example, after seeing a taunting illustration by Gyro Gearloose in a rocket instruction manual, Della flies into a rage; not only tearing the manual apart, but also stomping on the remains. Della also shares personality traits with her sons, including their fearlessness and mischief. These common traits are what allow them to accept and bond with her once she returns home. Like her son Huey, Della was a Junior Woodchuck, as evidenced by her bringing her Junior Woodchuck Guidebook with her to the moon and quoting Junior Woodchuck rules by heart. Della also shares Dewey's adventurous spirit and Louie's quick-talking cleverness and tendency to cause trouble without considering the consequences.

Furthermore, Della is also shown to have an unstoppable attitude. This is established early in "What Ever Happened to Della Duck?!", which opens with Della having crashed her rocket on the Moon, and awakening to her leg trapped underneath the wreckage. After seeing a photo of her family and assessing the situation, she determines the wreckage is too heavy for her to move on her own, amputates her leg, and declares her intent to return home. As described by DuckTales producer Francisco Angones, "she's gonna beat every odd, she's gonna take charge of her decisions. She made the choice to amputate her leg [on the Moon] and it proved, nothing would stop her."

While Della is tenacious and determined, after finally making it back home, she struggles with returning to civilization and her family. While she has ample experience as an adventurer, she had little experience being a mom, and needed time to adjust to the responsibilities of being a parent. DuckTales co-producers Angones and Matt Youngberg said they wanted to use Della to depict how difficult, but also rewarding, it is to be a mom. It was revealed in the episode "The Lost Harp of Mervana!" that Della suffers from a strong dislike towards fish. Della also suffers from eisoptrophobia (fear of mirrors or seeing one's reflection in a mirror) from her time on the Moon when she was so desperate for human connection that she had a staring contest with her reflection that lasted three weeks.
