= Vic Lockman =

American cartoonist (1927–2017)

- Born: October 19, 1927
- Died: June 1, 2017 (aged 89)
- Occupation: Cartoonist

Vic Lockman (October 19, 1927 – June 1, 2017) was an American Christian cartoonist and comic strip writer. He started cartooning from a young age, taught by his father. He was once head of the art department for the School of Aviation Medicine at Randolph Field, Texas. He was married and had 6 children. His son, Mark Thomas Lockman (1952–1989) was a journalist, to whom one of Vic's cartoon books was dedicated.

Among the many comic strips and cartoons he created, Lockman might be most known for his characters created for Disney comics in 1960; Newton Gearloose and Moby Duck.

In 1985 Lockman created “Who’s Behind the South African Crisis?”, the pro-apartheid comic as a supplement to newsletters published by the Canadian League of Rights. According to Michael Beukert, "While the blatant racism expressed by the cartoon is shocking, it outlines many of the tropes which were commonly articulated by right-wing and even liberal commentators sympathetic to South Africa. Furthermore, the most violently racist of the tropes produced below — including the idea that Africans are incapable of governing themselves, and the threat of black violence against young white women — were contemporaneously being repeated by newspaper columnists in places like the Toronto Sun."

== Books and various publications ==
=== Various ===
- Biblical Economics in Comics
- Books/Bible Memory Chart
- Catechism For Young Children With Cartoons - Book I, Q. 1 through Q. 71
- Catechism For Young Children With Cartoons - Book II, Q. 72 through Q. 145
- Church History for Young Children (The Reformation)
- Coloring Book (Catechism) - Book I
- Coloring Book (Catechism) - Book II
- English Grammar & Stories With Cartoons
- Father Time (Evolution Defeated)
- Forgotten Minority (Exclusive Psalmody)
- God's Law for Modern Man
- How Shall We Worship God?
- In These Last Days
- Infant Baptism
- Instrumental Music & Worship
- John G. Schmitz v. Big Brother
- Money, Banking and Usury
- Psalm Singing for Kids
- Reading & Understanding the Bible
- Revelation, The Book of
- Spanish Catechism for Young Children With Cartoons - Book I, Q. 1 through Q. 71
- Spanish Catechism for Young Children With Cartoons - Book II, Q. 72 through Q. 145
- Super Bug... Gospel in the Woods
- The Lord's Supper (Closed Communion)
- Water, Water Everywhere (The Great Flood)
- Westminster Confession of Faith (Summary Outline)
- Westminster Shorter Catechism With Cartoons, Book I
- Westminster Shorter Catechism With Cartoons, Book II
- Who is God? (Q4-6, WSC)
- Who Stopped the Clock (70 Wks/Dan.9)
- Who's Behind the South African Crisis? - a pro-Apartheid Comic strip from 1985
- Worship Principle, Elements & Circumstances

=== Drawing books ===
- Big Book of Cartooning (In Christian Perspective), Book I (1990)
- Big Book of Cartooning (In Christian Perspective), Book II, Animals (1991)
- Big Book of Cartooning, Machines
- Cartooning for Young Children, Book I
- Cartooning for Young Children, Book II
- Drawing for Girls
- Miracle Art, Trick Drawing
- Trace & Learn Drawing Book

=== 12-page tracts ===
- Christian Baptism
- Counterfeit Covenant
- D-A-I-S-Y vs. T.U.L.I.P, Who's in Control, Man or God?
- God's Inspired Word
- Heresy vs. Creeds
- Justification By Faith Alone
- Roman Catholic Mass
- The Lord's Supper
- T.U.L.I.P.
- The Universe 6000 Years Old?

== See also ==
- Newton Gearloose
- Moby Duck
