= Black Donald =

Name for the Devil in Scottish mythology

Black Donald (Scottish Gaelic: Domhnall Dubh or Domnuill-dhu) is a Highland colloquialism for the Devil in Scottish mythology. The defining characteristic of Black Donald is his cloven feet, which betray whatever disguise he assumes.

== In history ==
- The first chief of historical record, and the eleventh chief, of Clan Cameron was Domnhuill Dubh, who fought as a vassal of the Lord of the Isles at Harlaw in 1411.
