= Tony Strobl =

American cartoonist

- Born: Anthony Joseph Strobl; May 12, 1915 Cleveland, Ohio, U.S.
- Died: December 29, 1991 (aged 76) Ohio, U.S.
- Area: Cartoonist

Anthony Joseph Strobl (/ˈstroʊbəl/ STROH-bəl; May 12, 1915 – December 29, 1991) was an American comics artist and animator. He was born in Cleveland, Ohio and attended Cleveland School of Art from 1933 to 1937, with Jerry Siegel and Joe Shuster, who actually got some help from Strobl creating Superman. Gerard Jones in his book Men of Tomorrow reveals at one point Jerry Siegel contemplated ending his partnership with Joe Shuster in developing what became Superman and work with someone else instead. Strobl was among those approached but he respectfully declined, feeling his more cartoony artstyle was ill-suited for such a serious character.

== Biography ==
After finishing his education, Strobl became impressed enough by Snow White and the Seven Dwarfs to seek a job at Walt Disney Studios. After a refusal, he eventually was hired in 1938. He worked as an animator on Fantasia, Dumbo, and Pinocchio before he left the studio to fight in World War II.

In 1942, Strobl saved a seven-year-old girl from drowning while working for an Army propaganda unit. He returned to animation after the war, but moved over to the comics field, and after a few commercial artist jobs, he started working for Western Publishing in 1947.

At Western, he illustrated primarily Disney comics, especially from the Duck universe. Starting with a Bucky Bug story for Walt Disney's Comics and Stories #100 in 1949, Strobl had a long and impressive production of Disney comics. He did comic book stories for Western until 1968, and for the Disney Studio Program from 1963 to his retirement in 1987. Although during his career he primarily illustrated stories written by others, he wrote some of his stories himself.

Some of those ones presented noteworthy one-off characters that were involved with distinct members of the Duck Family, such as Minny Pearl Beauregard, a country lady who had vowed to become Scrooge McDuck's bride after being saved from drowning by him; Charlie, an old school chum of Daisy Duck who became a distinguished jet pilot and almost became her fiancé; and Vonda Von Duck, a female citizen of the fictional country of Zonrovia who at first had enjoyed very much a photo of Donald Duck that he sent to her. Besides, four peculiar cousins of Scrooge had spotlighted appearances in four classic comic stories drawn by Strobl, respectively. Wee Angus McDuck, Cyril McDuck, Lurch McDuck (aka Sheik Beak), and Rufus Fuddleduck. Strobl also illustrated some stories written by Carl Barks after the latter's 1966 retirement. The most significant of these ones are "King Scrooge the First" and "Pawns of the Loup Garou".

In addition to Disney, Strobl illustrated comics with several other characters, such as Bugs Bunny and Woody Woodpecker.

Strobl died in Ohio in 1991.

In the Hall of Fame series of hardcover books devoted to the greatest Duck (and Mouse) comics artists, published in Norwegian, Danish and Swedish by Egmont, Volume 15 (2006) is dedicated to Strobl's work.

According to the book Walt's People - Volume 3: Talking Disney with the Artists who Knew Him by Didier Ghez, which presents a full reprint of an interview with Tony himself made by Klaus Strzyz in 1980, the prolific cartoonist got used to the idea of seeing Disney publishing comic stories without giving credit to their respective creators, but not without having a little resentment. He affirmed that he never felt himself overshadowed by Carl Barks's popularity, especially because he worked with a larger number of characters throughout his career. Strobl also revealed in this same interview his admiration for the works of Carl Barks (the best of all, according to him), Jack Bradbury and Ralph Heimdahl.
