= DuckTales (2017 TV series) =

American animated television series

- Genre: Adventure; Comedy; Mystery; Science fiction; Fantasy
- Based on: DuckTales by Jymn Magon; Uncle Scrooge by Carl Barks
- Developed by: Matt Youngberg; Francisco Angones
- Showrunners: Matt Youngberg; Francisco Angones
- Voices of: David Tennant; Danny Pudi; Ben Schwartz; Bobby Moynihan; Kate Micucci; Beck Bennett; Toks Olagundoye; Tony Anselmo; Paget Brewster
- Theme music composer: Mark Mueller
- Opening theme: "DuckTales Theme" by Felicia Barton
- Ending theme: "DuckTales Theme" (instrumental)
- Composer: Dominic Lewis
- Country of origin: United States
- Original language: English
- No. of seasons: 3
- No. of episodes: 69 (list of episodes)

Production
- Executive producer: Matt Youngberg
- Producer: Suzanna Olson
- Editors: Jasmine Bocz (also animatic); Jon Price (also animatic)
- Running time: 22 minutes 44 minutes (special episodes only); 67 minutes (series finale)
- Production company: Disney Television Animation

Original release
- Network: Disney XD
- Release: August 12 – December 2, 2017
- Release: April 4, 2020 – March 15, 2021
- Network: Disney Channel
- Release: May 4, 2018 – September 12, 2019

Related
- DuckTales (original series)

DuckTales is an American animated television series developed by Matt Youngberg and Francisco Angones, and produced by Disney Television Animation. The series is a reboot of the original 1987 series of the same name, itself an adaptation of Uncle Scrooge and other Duck universe comic books created by Carl Barks. The show focuses on the lives of Scrooge McDuck and his family as they engage in a variety of adventures in the fictional city of Duckburg and around the world. The reboot itself adds new elements and deeper character stories, including a greater involvement of Donald Duck as well as the introduction of his twin sister, Della Duck.

The series premiered on August 12, 2017, with a 44-minute long pilot episode on Disney XD, before the first season was green-lit for broadcast from September 23 that year on Disney XD. From May 2018 to September 2019, the series was moved to Disney Channel for the previously not broadcast part of the first season and all of the second season. DuckTales was then moved back to Disney XD for its third season, and concluded with a 67-minute finale on March 15, 2021. The series has received positive reviews from critics, with praise for its voice acting, humor, writing, animation, and expanded depth from the original series. Since its release, it has also expanded to a comic book series, a scripted podcast, and several online shorts.

== Premise ==
Left to right: Dewey, Huey, Donald Duck, Louie, and Scrooge McDuck, as they appear in the series.

After not speaking to each other for ten years, Donald Duck reunites with his estranged uncle, business mogul and former adventurer Scrooge McDuck, when he asks him to babysit his triplet nephews, Huey, Dewey, and Louie, for the day. Shortly after accidentally releasing and defeating a few ancient evils, and a trip to Atlantis, Scrooge regains his sense of adventure and invites Donald and the boys to live at McDuck Manor with him, along with his housekeeper Mrs. Beakley and her granddaughter Webby Vanderquack. Together, along with Scrooge's chauffeur and pilot Launchpad McQuack, the Ducks go on many new treasure-hunting expeditions and globetrotting adventures while contending with villains like Flintheart Glomgold, Ma Beagle and the Beagle Boys, and Mark Beaks.

In the first season, Dewey and Webby search for the truth about Scrooge and Donald's strained relationship and the unexplained disappearance of the boys' mother and Donald's twin sister Della Duck while the sorceress Magica De Spell manipulates events to facilitate her return and exact revenge on Scrooge for imprisoning her in his Number One Dime.

In the second season, Scrooge and Glomgold set up a wager to become the Richest Duck in the World by the end of the year, with the loser's company being acquired by the winner; Louie tries to start up his own multi-million dollar business in hopes of following in Scrooge's footsteps, and Della reunites with her family following her escape from the Moon and adapts to her newfound motherhood, unaware that the Moonlanders, led by General Lunaris, are planning to invade Earth.

In the third season, the McDuck family sets out to find several lost artifacts detailed in the journal of the legendary explorer Isabella Finch, while the criminal organization F.O.W.L. seeks to eliminate Scrooge and his family and obtain the artifacts first in order to rid the world of adventuring.

== Episodes ==
Season	Episodes		Originally released		
Season	Episodes		First released	Last released	Network
1	23	9	August 12, 2017	December 2, 2017	Disney XD
1	23	14	May 4, 2018	August 18, 2018	Disney Channel
2	24		October 20, 2018	September 12, 2019	Disney Channel
3	22		April 4, 2020	March 15, 2021	Disney XD

Note: Each color represents which one of the triplets gets the main focus.

== Voice cast ==
The series' main voice cast includes:

- David Tennant as Scrooge McDuck
- Danny Pudi as Huey Duck
- Ben Schwartz as Dewey Duck
- Bobby Moynihan as Louie Duck
- Kate Micucci as Webby Vanderquack
- Tony Anselmo as Donald Duck
- Paget Brewster as Della Duck
- Toks Olagundoye as Mrs. Beakley
- Beck Bennett as Launchpad McQuack

== Production ==
Matt Youngberg and Francisco Angones grew up watching the original series and had always wanted to develop an updated version for a newer generation. Youngberg said, "We're hoping that in thirty years, the kids who watch our show will then be bringing back the next version of DuckTales because they loved what we did so much."

In May 2015, Terry McGovern, the original voice of Launchpad McQuack, stated in an interview that the entire voice cast from the original series would not be returning for the reboot, which made him "heartsick" at the news. The new voice cast for the series was revealed on December 16, 2016, in a video where they sing an a cappella version of the original theme song in promotion of the news. The following May, Lin-Manuel Miranda was announced as the voice of Fenton Crackshell-Cabrera / Gizmoduck. The character was changed to being Latino due to Lin-Manuel's heritage and because Angones felt that there were not enough positive Latino superheroes. In June, more cast members, including Tony Anselmo reprising his role as Donald Duck, were announced, and during the 2017 San Diego Comic-Con, Disney announced that Darkwing Duck would also make an appearance in the TV series. At the 2019 San Diego Comic-Con, several characters from other Disney Television Animation cartoons were revealed to appear in the show's third season: Chip 'n' Dale and the Rescue Rangers from Chip 'n Dale: Rescue Rangers; Kit Cloudkicker and Molly Cunningham from TaleSpin; Rhinokey and Butterbear from The Wuzzles; and Gosalyn Mallard and Taurus Bulba from Darkwing Duck; as well as Goofy (based on his Goof Troop incarnation), and Daisy Duck.

According to Francisco Angones, the crew requested the series' premieres move back to Disney XD for the third season to "preserve the proper air order," and not end up in a situation like the original series where episodes are out of order for "30 years worth of home media and streaming releases" due to how they aired in syndication.

The art style of the show is heavily influenced not just by Carl Barks' original Uncle Scrooge comics, but also some of Barks' paintings. The theme song, written by Mark Mueller for the 1987 series, was re-recorded for the 2017 reboot. It was arranged by Michael "Smidi" Smithand and TJ Stafford and sung by Felicia Barton.

Toon City and Snipple Animation provided animation services for the series. Snipple used a paperless animation style (where artists draw frames by hand digitally) to animate the series.

Donald Duck has a larger role in this version compared to the 1980s version, as the earlier version had been restricted by an edict from The Walt Disney Company – stating that the television studio could not use Donald or any of the other stars from Disney's Golden Age shorts, only allowing Donald to make short cameos to set up storylines; this restriction was lifted shortly after the original version of DuckTales ended.

== Theme song ==
The popular theme song, written by pop songwriter Mark Mueller (both words and music), was the subject of a Vanity Fair magazine article in 2017, which called the song "History's Catchiest Single Minute of Music". The 2017 version of the theme song is sung by Felicia Barton, a notable children's singer.

== Release ==
=== Broadcast ===
The 44-minute pilot, titled "Woo-oo!", premiered on Disney XD on August 12, 2017, at midnight and was repeated consecutively for the next 24 hours. Two days later on August 14, 2017, the pilot was also released on YouTube. The video was later set to private on an unknown date, and reuploaded on April 10, 2018. The pilot also aired on Disney Channel on September 17, 2017. The series officially premiered on September 23, 2017, coinciding with the original show's 30th anniversary. On May 1, 2018, the show moved to Disney Channel, with new episodes airing on Fridays beginning May 4, 2018. With season three, the series returned to Disney XD.

On October 20, 2020, "Let's Get Dangerous!", the 44-minute Darkwing Duck-themed episode from season 3, was made available for free on Disney XD's YouTube channel. Between September 26 and October 6, 2022, the entirety of season 1 was uploaded as well. On June 1, 2026, a 9-hour compilation featuring every episode from season 1 was uploaded to the Disney Channel Animation YouTube channel.

In Canada, the pilot premiered on Disney XD on August 12 and the full series started on September 23, 2017. In Australia and New Zealand, the show premiered on Disney Channel on October 13, 2017. In the United Kingdom and Ireland, the pilot premiered on Disney Channel on November 4, 2017, and the full series debuted on March 1, 2018, on Disney XD.

==== Reruns ====
As of 2026, DuckTales continues to air reruns daily on Disney XD in the United States. The show briefly returned to Disney Channel in July 2025 and 2026, airing the episode "JAW$" for SharkFest. In Japan, the series airs reruns daily on both Disney Junior and Disney Channel. In Canada, the series aired on Disney XD on weekends at 10:00 AM ET until the channel shut down on September 1, 2025. In Germany, the series airs weekly on Disney Channel.

=== Marketing ===
On December 7, 2016, a teaser trailer was released for the series. The first season was announced to consist of 21 half-hour episodes and two hour-long specials. On March 10, 2017, a trailer for the series aired on Disney Channel during the premiere of Tangled: Before Ever After. On June 14, 2017, the title sequence for the series, featuring a re-recording of the theme song written by Mark Mueller, performed by Felicia Barton and animated by Golden Wolf, was released.

=== Home media ===
A DVD titled Woo-oo! was released on December 19, 2017, in the US and on July 9, 2018, in the UK and Ireland. The DVD contains the pilot episode and all 6 Welcome to Duckburg! shorts. A second DVD titled Destination Adventure! was released on June 5, 2018. It contains the episodes "The Beagle Birthday Massacre!", "The Living Mummies of Toth-Ra!", "The Impossible Summit of Mt. Neverrest!", "The Spear of Selene!", "The Missing Links of Moorshire!", and "Beware the B.U.D.D.Y. System!", as well as 2 episodes of the original 1987 series previously unreleased on DVD ("New Gizmo Kids on the Block" and "Ducky Mountain High").

DVD releases
Region	Set title	Seasons	Aspect ratio	Episode count	Release date
1 & 2	Woo-oo!	1	1.78:1	1	December 19, 2017 (Region 1); July 9, 2018 (Region 2)
1	Destination Adventure!	1	1.78:1, 1.33:1 (classic series)	6	June 5, 2018

=== Video on demand ===
In the United States, iTunes and Amazon Prime Video offer all three seasons, split into six volumes.

The first and second seasons have been released on Disney+ since its launch, but users have noted episodes being out of order. The series had its episodes arranged in the proper order on June 26, 2020. The entire third season was released on Disney+ on April 30, 2021.

Prior to the global launch of Disney+, the pilot episode "Woo-oo!" was made available on Netflix in Brazil on February 1, 2019. It was later removed on an unknown date.

== Reception ==
=== Critical reception ===
The review aggregator website Rotten Tomatoes reports an approval rating of 100% based on 12 reviews, with an average rating of 9/10. The website's critical consensus reads, "Highly energetic, distinctively designed, and attuned to its nostalgia, this update to a Disney animated classic is far bolder than its predecessor."

IGN's Chris Hayner gave the series premiere, "Woo-oo!", a score of 8.5 out of 10, stating that the reboot "may be aimed at modern young audiences but there's no denying the heart and adventurous spirit it gets from the original series." IndieWire complimented the series premiere, claiming that "the reboot of the series keeps all of those important original hallmarks. American Idol alum Felicia Barton re-recorded the signature theme song but keeps its sense of fun and excitement intact." Collider rated the last season 5 out of 5, indicating that "Season 3 is really where the new vision of the fan-favorite series takes off." Den of Geek reviewed the last episode of the show positively, stating, "DuckTales has power; it'll keep having power. Now that the show's ended I have no doubt more people will check it out on Disney+ and realize how special it was. How great it was. How even if it still had more stories to tell it still gave all it had." ComicsBeat praised the series, saying, "With an unimpeachable cast, a clever sense of humor, and a commitment to the underlying thematic concerns of the story, these three seasons represent the best-case scenario for the reboot of a beloved TV show: a sensationally self-aware series that takes its characters seriously while still delivering side-splitting slapstick." CinemaBlend.com gave a positive review of the series, praising the humor of the show, alongside the performance of the voice actors.

Disney comics creator Don Rosa, primarily known for his Uncle Scrooge comic sub-series The Life and Times of Scrooge McDuck, has stated that the DuckTales reboot series bears "virtually no similarity whatsoever" to Barks' original comics.

Tad Stones, best known for creating and producing Darkwing Duck (1991-1992), stated in a Reddit AMA that he "really liked DuckTales 2017" and "enjoy[s] it more than the original".

=== Audience demand ===
According to Parrot Analytics, in July 2021, DuckTales had 17.34 times the demand of the average TV show, and was the most in-demand children's show in the United States released within the past 5 years in that month. In the same month, the show had a demand of 5.81 times in Canada, 3.62 times in the United Kingdom, and 10.49 times internationally. In March 2021, Kidscreen reported that DuckTales was the fourth most in-demand show on Disney+, only behind Mickey Mouse Clubhouse, Gravity Falls, and Star Wars: The Clone Wars. In 2021, D23 stated that DuckTales was the highest-rated show on Disney XD and had reached over 234 million views on social media and YouTube since the series premiered in 2017.

=== Accolades ===
Year	Award	Category	Recipient(s)	Result	Ref.
2018	Daytime Emmy Award	Outstanding Special Class Animated Program	Matt Youngberg, Francisco Angones, Suzanna Olson (for "Woo-oo!")	Nominated	
2018	Behind the Voice Actors Awards	People's Choice Voice Acting Award in the Best Vocal Ensemble in a New Television Series category	DuckTales cast	Won	
2018	Davey Awards	Silver Award for Mobile Features-Integrated Mobile Experience	Walt Disney Studios (for DuckTales: Treasure Hunt Live!)	Won	
2019	Daytime Emmy Award	Outstanding Special Class Animated Program	Matt Youngberg, Francisco Angones, Suzanna Olson (for "The Shadow War!")	Nominated	
2019	Daytime Emmy Award	Outstanding Casting for an Animated Series or Special	Aaron Drown, Julia Pleasants	Nominated	
2019	Imagen Awards	Best Actor – Television	Lin-Manuel Miranda	Nominated	
2019	Imagen Awards	Best Children's Programming	DuckTales	Nominated	
2020	Daytime Emmy Award	Outstanding Writing for an Animated Program	Francisco Angones, Colleen Evanson, Madison Bateman, Christian Magalhaes, Robert Snow, Suzanna Olson, Matt Youngberg	Nominated	
2020	Daytime Emmy Award	Outstanding Editing for an Animated Program	Jasmine Bocz, Mike Williamson, Barbara Ann Duffy, Susan Odjakjian	Nominated	
2020	Daytime Emmy Award	Outstanding Sound Editing for an Animated Program	Jeff Shiffman, Ian Howard, Katie Jackson, Carol Ma	Nominated	
2020	Daytime Emmy Award	Outstanding Performer in an Animated Program	Paget Brewster (for playing: "Della Duck")	Nominated	
2020	GLAAD Media Award	Outstanding Children's Programming	DuckTales	Nominated	
2021	GLAAD Media Award	Outstanding Children's Programming	DuckTales	Nominated	
2021	Daytime Emmy Award	Outstanding Casting for an Animated Program	David Wright, Aaron Drown, and Julia Pleasants	Nominated	

== Spin-off ==
The showrunners pitched a Darkwing Duck reboot as a spin-off of the show. However, the pitch was ultimately rejected in favor of an unrelated revival series in collaboration with Point Grey Pictures. In a YouTube interview, original Darkwing Duck series creator Tad Stones said that the DuckTales showrunners did "an entire Darkwing presentation" but were told the studio was planning on doing something "more limited." The crew later "rejiggered" the pitch, however it was rejected with Disney wanting to "put it out there to other people."

In 2020, Den of Geek interviewed the showrunners and asked a question regarding a possible Darkwing Duck spin-off, and stated that the showrunners were "evasive in their answers". The same question was later asked by Screen Rant, with co-executive producer Francisco Angones responding with "We love these characters and have so many more stories to tell with them. We'd love to keep exploring those stories in whatever format as long as we can."

== Theme parks ==
In 2019, Disney announced that DuckTales World Showcase Adventure was coming to EPCOT, replacing Phineas and Ferb: Agent P's World Showcase Adventure. The project was delayed due to Walt Disney World closing for COVID-19; it was eventually released on December 16, 2022. As part of Toontown's reimagining in 2023, statues of Huey, Dewey, Louie, and Webby were added to Donald's Boat, where they can be seen through the boat's portholes at Donald's Duck Pond.

In 2024, concept art for a proposed DuckTales attraction at Toontown was leaked, set to replace Roger Rabbit's Car Toon Spin. The concept art reportedly revealed that the ride's story would have featured a battle against Magica De Spell. However, the project never materialized, with the source citing the COVID-19 pandemic as the reason.

== Printed media ==
=== Prose books ===
In 2018, Disney Press published DuckTales: Solving Mysteries and Rewriting History!, a companion book covering the majority of season one, as seen from the perspective of Scrooge, Huey, Dewey, Louie, and Webby. It is written by Rob Renzetti and show writer Rachel Vine.

=== Art book ===
In 2022, Ken Plume revealed he was working on a DuckTales art book. Titled The Art of DuckTales, the book was published by Dark Horse Comics and released on October 24, 2022.

=== Comics ===
A comic book series based on the show was published by IDW Publishing from 2017 until 2020, with Joe Caramagna, Joey Cavalieri and Steve Behling sharing writing duties, and Luca Usai, Gianfranco Florio and others providing the art. DuckTales #0 was released on July 19, 2017, and #1 of the monthly series followed on September 27.

The individual issues are also collected in trade paperbacks:

- Treasure Trove (ISBN 9781684052080), collecting issues #0–2
- Mysteries and Mallards (ISBN 9781684052301), collecting issues #3–5
- Quests and Quacks (ISBN 9781684053193), collecting issues #6–8
- Fowl Play (ISBN 9781684054039), collecting issues #9–11
- Monsters and Mayhem (ISBN 9781684054909), collecting issues #12–14
- Mischief and Miscreants (ISBN 9781684055593), collecting issues #15–17
- Imposters and Interns (ISBN 9781684056132), collecting issues #18–20
- Silence and Science (ISBN 9781684056699), collecting issues #1–3 of the Silence and Science run of comics
- Faires and Scares (ISBN 9781684057184), collecting issues #1–3 of the Faires and Scares run of comics

==== List of comic book stories ====
Story code	US publication	Title	Written by	Artist(s)	Short summary
XPW DTP CP 1-1	DuckTales #1	"The Chilling Secret of the Lighthouse!"	Joe Caramagna	Luca Usai	After Donald is hired to work in a lighthouse, Huey, Dewey and Louie decide to explore it.
XPW DTP CP 1-2	DuckTales #0	"The Repeating Revenge of the Screaming Duck!"	Joe Caramagna	Gianfranco Florio	Huey, Dewey and Louie make a horror movie.
XPW DTP CP 1-3	DuckTales #0	"Big Trouble at Little Lake!"	Joe Caramagna	Andrea Greppi, Paolo Campinoti, Roberta Zanotta	Donald is stranded on an island with a tour group.
XPW DTP CP 1-4	DuckTales #1	"The Great Experiment of the Washing Machine!"	Joe Caramagna	Gianfranco Florio	The nephews masquerade as researchers and manage to turn a washing machine into a potentially harmful electromagnet.
XPW DTP CP 2-1	DuckTales #2	"A Viking at My Door!"	Joey Cavalieri	Andrea Greppi, Antonello Dalena, Roberta Zanotta	Scrooge, Donald and Della go in search of a Viking artifact.
XPW DTP CP 2-2	DuckTales #2	"Old Monteplumage Had a Chicken!"	Joey Cavalieri	Gianfranco Florio	Scrooge, Donald, and Della go to an Aztec ruin.
XPW DTP CP 2-3	DuckTales #3	"Cheating Like Nostradogmus!"	Joey Cavalieri	Luca Usai	Scrooge goes looking for the time-travel jelly beans of Nostradogmus.
XPW DTP CP 2-4	DuckTales #3	"Beware of the Phenomenal Pumpkin People!"	Joey Cavalieri	Andrea Greppi, Graziano Barbaro, Roberta Zanotta	After crash-landing in the Amazon, Scrooge and crew encounter pygmy pandas being terrorized by monsters for their pumpkin groves.
XPW DTT CP 1-1	DuckTales #5	"A Series of Unfortunate Substitutions!"	Joe Caramagna	Antonello Dalena, Gianfranco Florio, Manuela Razzi, Roberta Zanotta	Scrooge hires a new pilot.
XPW DTT CP 1-2	DuckTales #4	"Fight!"	Joe Caramagna	Gianfranco Florio	Dewey holds a garage sale.
XPW DTT CP 1-3	DuckTales #5	"Go, Go Golden Years!"	Joey Cavalieri	Andrea Greppi, Cristina Stella, Emilio Urbano, Michela Frare	Scrooge takes youth serum.
XPW DTT CP 1-4	DuckTales #4	"Happy, Happy Valley!"	Joey Cavalieri	Luca Usai	Scrooge lands on an island where everyone is always happy.
XPW DTT CP 2-1	DuckTales #6	"The Giant Butterfly of Duckburg!"	Joe Caramagna	Graziano Barbaro, Marco Ghiglione, Michela Frare	Scrooge goes on a Junior Woodchucks outing.
XPW DTT CP 2-2	DuckTales #7	"There Is No Place Like a Ghost Town!"	Joe Caramagna	Luca Usai	Scrooge buys an old western ghost town with the intent of building a resort.
XPW DTT CP 2-3	DuckTales #6	"Welcome to Beagle Island!"	Joey Cavalieri	Gianfranco Florio	The Beagle Boys lay a trap for Scrooge.
XPW DTT CP 2-4	DuckTales #7	"The Stone of Truth!"	Joe Caramagna	Andrea Greppi, Antonello Dalena, Gianfranco Florio, Michela Frare	The mansion is hit with a surprise inspection by an insurance company while Scrooge is away.
XPW DTT CP 3-1	DuckTales #8	"Sleep (Walk) of Doom!"	Steve Behling	Gianfranco Florio	Dewey uses Scrooge's mystical coin.
XPW DTT CP 3-2	DuckTales #8	"The Beast in the Board Room!"	Joe Caramagna	Luca Usai	Scrooge's stooge begins to take control of his company.
XPW DTT CP 3-3	Unpublished in the US	"Spies Like Us!"	Joe Caramagna	Andrea Greppi, Danilo Loizedda, Emilio Urbano, Manuela Razzi, Cristina Stella	TBD
XPW DTT CP 3-4	DuckTales #9	"The Frightful Family Fishing Trip!"	Alessandro Ferrari, Steve Behling	Ciro Cangialosi, Cristina Stella	Donald and Scrooge go on a fishing trip.
XPW DTT CP 4-1	DuckTales #9	"The Risk McDuck Refused!"	Joey Cavalieri	Gianfranco Florio	Scrooge travels back in time so he can experience the Klondike.
XPW DTT CP 4-2	DuckTales #10	"The Twisted Tale of the Two-Headed Horse!"	Joe Caramagna	Emilio Urbano, Luca Usai	The nephews accompany Scrooge and Donald on a quest for a bust of a Two-Headed Horse.
XPW DTT CP 4-3	DuckTales #10	"The Hedge Enigma!"	Steve Behling	Ciro Cangialosi, Cristina Giorgill	Hedges of wealthy people are being vandalized.
XPW DTT CP 4-4	Unpublished in the US	"On the Tail of the Run-Amok Raven!"	Joey Cavalieri	Andrea Greppi, Gianfranco Florio, Michela Frare	TBD
XPW DTT CP 5-1	DuckTales #12	"When Luck Ran Out!"	Steve Behling	Gianfranco Florio	Gladstone accompanies Scrooge on one of his adventures.
XPW DTT CP 5-2	DuckTales #11	"Nightmare on Bear Mountain!"	Steve Behling	Antonello Dalena, Danilo Loizedda, Cristina Stella	Scrooge pushes his family away to protect them from an ancient evil.
XPW DTT CP 5-3	DuckTales #11	"Horror in the Highlands!"	Joey Cavalieri	Luca Usai	Scrooge attempts to build a museum in his hometown.
XPW DTT CP 5-4	DuckTales #12	"The Greatest Adventure, the Greatest Price!"	Joey Cavalieri	Andrea Greppi, Emilio Urbano, Cristina Stella	Scrooge meets a duck claiming to be his unknown cousin.
XPW DTT CP 6-1	DuckTales #13	"Countdown to Termination!"	Joey Cavalieri	Andrea Greppi, Ciro Cangialosi, Cristina Stella	The board of directors for McDuck Enterprises gives Gyro a challenge: invent something useful in 24 hours or lose his job.
XPW DTT CP 6-2	DuckTales #13	"The Mighty Ducks of Duckburg!"	Joe Caramagna	Luca Usai	Webby joins the nephews' hockey team.
XPW DTT CP 6-3	DuckTales #14	"The Monsters Are Due at McDuck Manor! Part 1"	Steve Behling	Gianfranco Florio	The nephews and Webby use Gyro's new 4-D camera and end up trapping themselves in the television.
XPW DTT CP 6-4	DuckTales #14	"The Monsters Are Due at McDuck Manor! Part 2"	Steve Behling	Gianfranco Florio	The nephews and Webby use Gyro's new 4-D camera and end up trapping themselves in the television.
XPW DTT CP 7-1	DuckTales #16	"The Incredible Shrinking Webby! Part 1"	Steve Behling	Gianfranco Florio	Dewey accidentally shrinks Webby.
XPW DTT CP 7-2	DuckTales #16	"The Incredible Shrinking Webby! Part 2"	Steve Behling	Gianfranco Florio	Dewey accidentally shrinks Webby.
XPW DTT CP 7-3	DuckTales #15	"The Greatest Invention He's Never Had! Part 1"	Joe Caramagna	Ciro Cangialosi, Danilo Loizedda, Cristina Stella	One of Gyro's inventions gains sentience and rebels on a television show.
XPW DTT CP 7-4	DuckTales #15	"The Greatest Invention He's Never Had! Part 2"	Joe Caramagna	Luca Usai	One of Gyro's inventions gains sentience and rebels on a television show.
XPW DTT CP 8-1	DuckTales #17	"Marooned in Mystery Mansion! Part 1"	Joe Caramagna	Emilio Urbano, Gianfranco Florio	Mrs. Beakley relates a story to Scrooge that had been wiped from his memory by government forces.
XPW DTT CP 8-2	DuckTales #17	"Marooned in Mystery Mansion! Part 2"	Joe Caramagna	Emilio Urbano, Gianfranco Florio	Mrs. Beakley relates a story to Scrooge that had been wiped from his memory by government forces.
XPW DTT CP 8-3	DuckTales #18	"Money Grubbing Hooligans from the Deep! Part 1"	Joe Caramagna	Emilio Urbano, Gianfranco Florio	A gigantic tsunami threatens to wipe out the Money Bin.
XPW DTT CP 8-4	DuckTales #18	"Money Grubbing Hooligans from the Deep! Part 2"	Joe Caramagna	Emilio Urbano, Gianfranco Florio	A gigantic tsunami threatens to wipe out the Money Bin.
XPW DTT CP 9-1	DuckTales #19	"Flintheart... McDuck?!? Part 1"	Steve Behling	Emilio Urbano, Gianfranco Florio	Flintheart has Scrooge abducted.
XPW DTT CP 9-2	DuckTales #19	"Flintheart... McDuck?!? Part 2"	Steve Behling	Emilio Urbano, Gianfranco Florio	Flintheart has Scrooge abducted.
XPW DTT CP 9-3	DuckTales #20	"Saga of the Super-Intern! Part 1"	Joe Caramagna	Luca Usai	Gyro makes adjustments to one of Fenton's projects.
XPW DTT CP 9-4	DuckTales #20	"Saga of the Super-Intern! Part 2"	Joe Caramagna	Ciro Cangialosi, Danilo Loizedda, Cristina Stella	Gyro makes adjustments to one of Fenton's projects.

- ^{TBD}To be determined

== Podcast ==
On March 10, 2021, it was announced that a seven-episode scripted podcast spinoff of the series would be launching via the Disney XD YouTube channel on March 29, two weeks after the series finale. The podcast is called This Duckburg Life (a parody of the popular public radio program/podcast This American Life) and is hosted by Huey Duck for "Duckburg Public Radio" and focuses on slice of life occurrences in Duckburg. Many of the cast from the series reprise their roles, including Tennant, Pudi, Schwartz, Moynihan, Micucci, Bennett, Olagundoye, Rash, Brener, Martindale, and Anselmo. It is Disney's first scripted podcast.
