= Atari 2600 homebrew =

Homebrew software on the Atari 2600 system

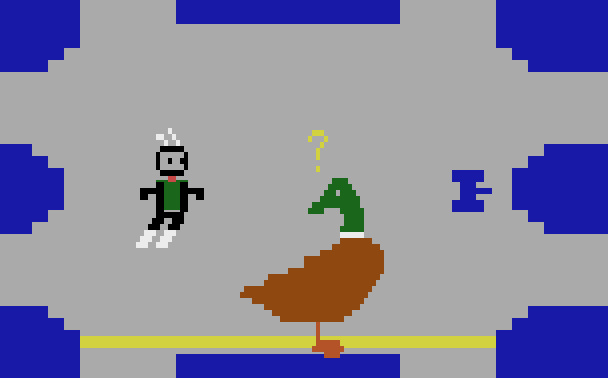
Duck Attack! (2010)

The first hobbyist-developed game for the Atari 2600 was written in 1995, and more than 100 have been released since then. Most are unlicensed clones of games for other platforms; some are original games or ROM hacks. With only 128 bytes of RAM, no frame buffer, and code and visuals closely intertwined, the 2600 is a difficult machine to program, and many homebrew titles are written for the technical challenge. Emulators, programming tools, and documentation are available.

Games that have received attention outside the hobbyist community include Halo 2600, Duck Attack!, and A-VCS-tec Challenge by Simon Quernhorst (2006), an unofficial port of the 1981 Atari 8-bit computer game Aztec Challenge. Others have been included in commercial products.

== History ==
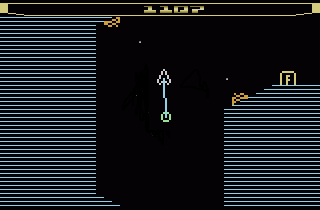
Thomas Jentzsch's 2600 version of Jeremy Smith's BBC Micro game Thrust (2000)

Launched as the Atari Video Computer System in 1977, the console was renamed the Atari 2600 in 1982. Between Atari and third-party publishers, hundreds of games were released for it, with some selling millions of copies. The 2600 continued to be manufactured through the 1980s, long past its peak years, until Atari Corporation finally dropped support for it in January 1992.

The next year, Harry Dodgson released the first hobbyist-produced cartridge: the 7800/2600 Monitor Cartridge, a development tool to help people program their own games. Dodgson offered the software to Atari, which they rejected. He decided to manufacture it on his own by cannibalizing Atari 7800 Hat Trick cartridges, which he bought on closeout from Big Lots for a dollar or less each. Dodgson advertised the cartridge on Usenet and in a catalog for game seller Video 61, ultimately selling around 25 copies.

In 1995 — three years after Atari's withdrawal of the 2600 from the marketplace — enthusiast Ed Federmeyer released SoundX, a cartridge to experiment with the sound capabilities of the system. Federmeyer used the term homebrew to describe hobbyist-driven development, inspired by the California Homebrew Computer Club of the 1970s. After designing the cartridge for his own use, Federmeyer advertised it on Usenet, followed by an unlicensed version of Tetris. Since then, over 100 games have been released, many published by AtariAge.

== Games ==
Medieval Mayhem is a version of the 1980 arcade game Warlords.

Most hobbyist-developed Atari 2600 games were created for the technical challenge, not as exercises in game design, and are unlicensed clones of arcade and computer games that were popular during the 1980s. Lady Bug, released by John W. Champeau in 2006, is an implementation of the 1981 Universal arcade game. Juno First, released by Chris Walton in 2009, borrows the name and design of the 1983 Konami arcade game; and Thrust, released by Thomas Jentzsch in 2000, is a clone of the BBC Micro game of the same name. Other programmers have implemented Sea Wolf (as Seawolf), Tetris (as Edtris 2600), and Caverns of Mars (as Conquest of Mars). The 2600 version of Star Castle was undertaken because it had previously been said that "a decent version couldn’t be done."

Several releases have expanded upon earlier games. Warring Worms, by Billy Eno (2002), takes the core design of Surround and adds new gameplay modes, such as the ability to fire shots at the opponent. Medieval Mayhem (2006) by, Darrell Spice Jr., is a version of the 1980 arcade game Warlords which includes elements omitted from Atari's official port.

There are also some original designs. In SCSIcide, released by Joe Grand in 2001, the player acts as a hard drive read head picking up color-coded data bits as they fly past. Oystron, released by Piero Cavina in 1997, is an action game in which "space oysters" are opened and pearls collected to earn ammunition. Duck Attack! allows the player to battle giant, fire-breathing ducks in a quest to save the world from a mad scientist.

In 2005, SCSIcide, Oystron, Warring Worms, Skeleton+, and Marble Craze were listed as the "Best 2600 Homebrew Games" in the book Gaming Hacks: 100 Industrial-Strength Tips & Tools by Simon Carless.

A demake is a port from a system generations past the 2600. Halo 2600 is a 4 KB game inspired by the Halo series of games. It was written by former Microsoft vice-president Ed Fries, who was involved in Microsoft's acquisition of Halo creator Bungie. Other 2600 demakes include the Portal-inspired Super 3D Portals 6 and a demo based on the Mega Man franchise. Princess Rescue is an unofficial 2600 port of Super Mario Bros., while Zippy the Porcupine is a game inspired by the Sonic the Hedgehog series.

ROM hacking modifies existing game programs. This typically includes alternate graphics and colors, but may involve gameplay modifications and the ability to use a different controller than the one for which the game was originally designed. One hack target is the 2600 version of Pac-Man, in which the graphic elements are reworked to more closely resemble the arcade version.

== Commercial releases ==
Video Euchre by Erik Eid is included in the 2003 Activision Anthology.

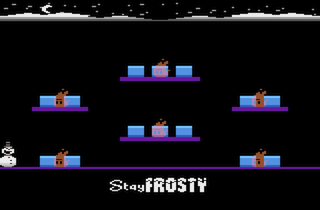
Stay Frosty by Darrell Spice Jr.

In 2003, Activision selected several homebrew 2600 games for inclusion in the Game Boy Advance version of its Activision Anthology: Climber 5 by Dennis Debro (2004), Okie Dokie by Bob Colbert (1996), Skeleton+ by Eric Ball (2003), Space Treat Deluxe by Fabrizio Zavagli (2003), Vault Assault by Brian Prescott (2001), Video Euchre by Erik Eid (2002), and Oystron.

In May 2018 it was announced that the Retron 77, a clone of the Atari 2600 console, would include four homebrew pack in-games: Astronomer, Baby, Muncher 77, and Nexion 3D.

== Development ==
The Atari 2600 is generally considered to be a very demanding programming environment, with a mere 128 bytes of RAM and no video frame buffer at all. The programmer must prepare each line of video output as it is being sent to the television. The only sprite capabilities are one-dimensional 1-bit and 8-bit patterns; creating a two-dimensional object requires changing the pattern between each line of video. Games are often developed using Atari 2600 emulators such as Stella and Z26.

Unlike later consoles, the 2600 will run any properly configured cartridge without checking for a digital signature or performing any other type of authentication. It was this aspect of the system that enabled third-party companies such as Activision and Imagic to develop Atari 2600 games without Atari's consent in the 1980s. This led Atari to incorporate authentication features in its later console, the Atari 7800, to prevent other companies from creating and selling their own 7800 games without Atari's permission.

With third-party hardware such as the Cuttle Cart and Harmony Cartridge, developers could load in-progress games onto a physical Atari console to test. The Cuttle Cart, developed by Chad Schell in the early 2000s, was designed to be compatible with the Starpath Supercharger, and allows ROM images to be loaded via an 1/8" minijack audio interface such as a cassette tape or CD player.

=== Batari Basic ===
As the 2600 uses the 6507, a variant of the MOS Technology 6502 processor, most games are written in 6502 assembly language. In 2007, developer Fred X. Quimby released the Batari Basic compiler allowing developers to write games in BASIC, a high-level programming language. Game designer and Georgia Institute of Technology associate professor Ian Bogost has used Batari Basic in his classes to teach students video game concepts and history. An integrated development environment for Microsoft Windows, Visual Batari Basic, is also available.

== See also ==
- Stella (emulator)
