= List of fictional ducks =

This list of fictional ducks is subsidiary to the list of fictional birds. It is restricted to notable duck characters from the world of fiction.

== Ducks in animation ==
=== Disney cartoon ducks ===
Disney animators have created an entire universe of ducks, most of which are modeled after the American Pekin duck.

==== Residents of the Donald Duck universe ====
- Andold Wild Duck, Brigitta MacBridge, Fenton Crackshell, Moby Duck, and Launchpad McQuack, supporting character ducks from Donald Duck's universe
- Angus McDuck, Dingus McDuck, Downy O'Drake, Fergus McDuck, Hortense McDuck, Hugh McDuck, Jake McDuck, Malcolm McDuck, Matilda McDuck, Molly Mallard, Pah-Peh-Rheo, Quagmire McDuck, Sir Eider McDuck, Sir Quackly McDuck, Sir Roast McDuck, Sir Stuft McDuck, and Sir Swamphole McDuck, duck members of Clan McDuck, Donald Duck and Scrooge McDuck's family and ancestry
- April, May and June, Daphne Duck, Della Duck, Eider Duck, Fethry Duck, Gladstone Gander, Grandma Duck, Humperdink Duck, Pintail Duck, and Quackmore Duck, duck members of Donald Duck's family and ancestry
- Bushroot, NegaDuck I and II, Quackerjack, Stegmutt, duck villains from the Darkwing Duck spinoff
- Daisy Duck, Donald Duck's female counterpart
- Darkwing Duck/Drake Mallard, main character and hero of the Darkwing Duck spinoff
- Donald Duck, cartoon duck created by Disney in 1934. Known as Paperinik in Disney's PKNA and as Maui Mallard in Maui Mallard in Cold Shadow
- Flintheart Glomgold, one of the main duck rivals of Scrooge McDuck
- Gosalyn Mallard and Morgana Macawber, secondary heroes and supporting character ducks from the Darkwing Duck spinoff
- Huey, Dewey, and Louie and their lost brother Phooey Duck, nephews of Donald Duck
- John D. Rockerduck, antagonist duck from Donald Duck's universe
- Ludwig Von Drake, Donald Duck's scientist uncle
- Magica De Spell, duck witch who is one of Scrooge McDuck's main antagonists and Donald Duck’s archenemy
- Mrs. Beakley, Bubba the Caveduck, Doofus Drake, Mrs.Crackshell, and Webby Vanderquack, ducks from the animated show DuckTales
- Scrooge McDuck, cartoon duck created by Disney in 1947 as Donald Duck's miserly uncle

==== Other Disney duck characters ====
- Canard Thunderbeak, Check "Grin" Hardwing, Duke L'Orange, Mallory McMallard, Nosedive Flashblade, Tanya Vanderflock, Wildwing Flashblade, the Mighty Ducks, superhero ducks from Disney's The Mighty Ducks
- Everett Ducklair, main character duck from PKNA
- Flick Duck, from the TV show PB&J Otter
- Stephan Vladuck/Camera 9 and Urk, minor duck characters from PKNA

=== Warner Bros. ducks ===
- Daffy Duck / Duck Dodgers, one of the main Looney Tunes characters and his alias from the Duck Dodgers spin-off series
- Danford Drake and Margo Mallard, students of the Perfecto Preps, from Tiny Toon Adventures
- Danger Duck, Daffy's descendant from Loonatics Unleashed
- Melissa Duck, Daffy's girlfriend from the original cartoons and a main character in the Baby Looney Tunes series
- Plucky Duck, a character inspired by Daffy Duck, from Tiny Toon Adventures
- Shirley the Loon, a character inspired by Melissa Duck, also from Tiny Toon Adventures although she is characterized as a loon instead of a duck
- Mrs. Daffy Duck (Daphne Duck), Daffy's dominant wife, known as Daphne Duck in two cartoons
- Tina Russo, Daffy's girlfriend, from The Looney Tunes Show

=== Other cartoon ducks ===
See List of fictional ducks in animation.

== Ducks in comics ==
=== Ducks in Krazy Kat ===
- Gooseberry Sprig, duck duke, comic-strip character created by George Herriman; later appeared in Herriman's Krazy Kat
- Mock Duck, fowl of Chinese descent who resembles a coolie and operates a cleaning establishment
- Mrs. Katalpa Kwakk Wakk, duck in a pillbox hat; scold who frequently notices Ignatz in the course of his plotting and then informs Officer Pupp

=== Other comics ===
- Anduck Duckanan, occasional character in the Thai comic series Apaimanee Saga
- Arne Anka, protagonist of Swedish comic strip Arne Anka drawn by Charlie Christensen
- Arthur, from Sheldon
- Choo Choo Curtis, postal carrier in Pogo
- Canardo, protagonist of Inspector Canardo
- Count Duckula
- Daddles
- Deadeye Duck, from Bucky O'Hare
- Deputy Duck, duck policeman in Slylock Fox
- Dilly Duckling, created by Edgar Henry Banger
- Dirty Duck, created by underground comix artist Bobby London
- Doctor Quack from Sonic the Hedgehog, duck who works at the Tommy Turtle Memorial Hospital; has a wife and kids.
  - Bean the Dynamite, is also a duck in the comics unlike his main series counterpart (who is a woodpecker).
- Doodles Duck and his nephew Lemuel (DC Comics)
- Dougie Duck from Teddy Tail (Friend of Teddy Tail, created by Herbert Sidney Foxwell.)
- The Duck - see mascots
- Fifi the Duck, character in the Marvel Comics universe
- Guard Duck, from Stephan Pastis' Pearls Before Swine
- Howard the Duck, character in the Marvel Comics universe
- Karoo, in the anime and manga series One Piece, the pet duck of Princess Nefertari Vivi
- Kvak, family's pet duck from Hägar the Horrible
- Lobo the Duck, a Marvel/DC amalgam character based on Howard the Duck and Lobo
- Lucky Ducky from Tom the Dancing Bug
- Mallard Fillmore, protagonist of the eponymous conservative political comic strip
- Mousse, from the popular manga Ranma ½, transforms into a duck when doused with cold water
- Rosemary, from Mr. Fredward's Duck
- Rubberduck, from Captain Carrot and His Amazing Zoo Crew (DC Comics)
- Super Duck
- Teeny, from the 1929–1937 British comic strip Tim, Toots & Teeny.
- Truman, from Frank Cho's Liberty Meadows.
- Wade, a with inflatable ring head duck coward from U.S. Acres
- Waddles, main character in Dok's Dippy Duck, started up by Dok Hager and continued by George Hager and later Ray Carlson and Carol Hager as Waddles.
- A little nameless duck is seated on the hat of De Generaal, the general in Peter de Smet's De Generaal.

== Live or costume ducks on television and film ==
- Aflac Duck, duck mascot for Aflac; has appeared in Aflac commercials
- Brian, from Spaced Invaders, spends the film dressed as a duck for Halloween
- Duck Girls, in Big Barn Farm
- Charlie, the duck from Disney's The Million Dollar Duck
- The Chick and The Duck, from the American sitcom Friends
- Duck, a wooden model seated on top of the Ragdoll narrowboat in the 1990s British children's TV show, Rosie & Jim.
- Dooby Duck, the presenter of Dooby Duck's Disco Bus
- Edd the Duck, puppet mallard from CBBC's The Broom Cupboard
- Ferdinand, adventurous white male duck who appears in Babe and Babe: Pig in the City
- Harry the Duck, Bear's long-lost friend from Bear in the Big Blue House.
- Howard the Duck, from the 1986 film of the same name based on the comic book
- Orville the Duck, green duckling puppet operated by Keith Harris
- Pato Torquato and Pata Vina, duck antagonists in Cocoricó
- Plucka Duck, from the Australian television program Hey Hey It's Saturday
- Saturnin le canard, from the 1960s French children's TV show Les Aventures de Saturnin; renamed Dynamo Duck and voiced by Dan Castellaneta for American audiences in the show The Adventures of Dynamo Duck
- Squacky, an energetic blue and yellow duck in Jim Henson's Pajanimals

== Ducks in literature and song ==
- Dab-Dab, female duck who is one of Dr. Dolittle's close companions in Hugh Lofting's series of books
- "Disco Duck", novelty song by Rick Dees
- The Duck, briefly seen in the fantasy novel Alice in Wonderland by Lewis Carroll
- The Duck Flock, flock of gangster mallard ducks who want revenge on a human gang in the music video "Get Up (Rattle)"
- The duck on the head of the beggar The Duck Man in the Discworld novels by Terry Pratchett
- DuckBob Spinowitz, man transformed into an anthropomorphic duck by aliens in the novel No Small Bills by Aaron Rosenberg.
- Ducky Lucky and Drakey Lakey, from Henny Penny/Chicken Licken
- Freda the duck from Emily Rodda's Key to Rondo series
- Fup, one of the main characters of the eponymous book by Jim Dodge
- Jemima Puddle-Duck, appears in The Tale of Jemima Puddle-Duck and with the other two Puddle-Ducks, Rebeccah and Mr. Drake, in The Tale of Tom Kitten, as well as Jemima Puddle-Duck's Painting Book
- The Lonesome Duck from The Magic of Oz, thirteenth volume in the Oz canon written by L. Frank Baum
- Mrs. Leda Duck, and Duck siblings, who adopt the human boy Arnold in Arnold of the Ducks by Mordicai Gerstein
- Mr. and Mrs. Mallard, and children Jack, Kack, Lack, Mack, Nack, Ouack, Pack, and Quack, in the children's book Make Way for Ducklings by Robert McCloskey
- Mr. and Mrs. Quack from "The Adventures of Poor Mrs. Quack" by Thornton Burgess in the "Old Mother West Wind" series of books
- The Mechanickal Duck in Thomas Pynchon's Mason & Dixon, a fictionalized version of the Digesting Duck created by Jacques de Vaucanson
- Ping, domesticated duck who lives on the Yangtze River in China; his story is told by Marjorie Flack with illustrations by Kurt Wiese in The Story about Ping
- Rapanden Rasmus from Rinkenæs Sogn, main character of the eponymous song, "Rapanden Rasmus fra Rinkenæs Sogn". In the song Rasmus takes a ride in his one horse carriage and problems ensue. The song was written by Danish poet Halfdan Rasmussen.
- The Rubber Duckie, owned by Sesame Street Muppet Ernie, and the subject of several of his signature songs, including "Rubber Duckie", "Put Down the Duckie", and "Do De Rubber Duck"
- Sonia the duck, a character in Peter and the Wolf by Sergei Prokofiev
- Dilly the duck, a minor character in the book Oliver the Western Engine, from the Reverend Wilbert Awdry's The Railway Series.

The Duck Song

== Duck mascots ==
- The Aflac Duck, used in advertising for the insurance company Aflac
- Attila the Mighty Duck, mascot of the Stevens Institute of Technology in Hoboken, New Jersey
- Dax the Duck, mascot of the internet search engine DuckDuckGo
- The Duck, mascot of community-run webcomic hosting site The Duck Webcomics. The site's original name, Drunk Duck, still very much influences the way the community members usually depict him, e.g. for presenting the annual DD awards.
- Duck Norris, mascot of Vanbrugh College, University of York
- Floyd D. Duck, mascot duck punk of Bubble Yum
- Lewis the Duck, mascot of Homewood Suites; has a wife Lois, daughter Lisa, and son Lance
- Irwin the Disco Duck, created by Peter Pan Records
- Maynard G. Mallard, mascot of the Madison Mallards collegiate baseball team
- Millard the Mallard, mascot of WRVA in Richmond, Virginia
- The Oregon Duck, mascot of University of Oregon's Oregon Ducks
- QuackerJack, mascot for the Long Island Ducks minor league baseball team
- Webster, the Orange RubberDuck of the Akron RubberDucks
- Wild Wing, mascot for the National Hockey League's Anaheim Ducks (originally the Mighty Ducks, named after the Mighty Ducks movies)

== Ducks in video games ==
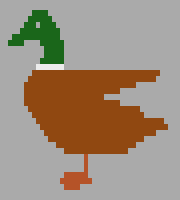
Bruce the Duck, from the Atari 2600 game Duck Attack!

- Bin and Pin from the arcade and Master System game Dynamite Düx.
- Deadly Duck, eponymous character of the Atari 2600 video game Deadly Duck (1982).
- The Atari 2600 game Duck Attack! (2010) features a mallard named Bruce, plus other ducks named Mandy, Pat, Groucho, and Clarice.
- The Mad Duck, one of the enemies in EarthBound.
- Prince Drake from Crazy Drake, 2D platformer released in 1996 for IBM PC compatibles.
- John Mallard, announcer from Duck Game (2015). All other characters in the game are anthropomorphic ducks, but they are unnamed.
- Some of the villagers in the Animal Crossing series are ducks, including Bill, Deena, Derwin, Drake, Freckles, Fruity, Gloria, Joey, Ketchup, Maelle, Mallary, Miranda, Molly, Pate, Pompom, Quillson, Scoot, Shinabiru, and Weber. Three of them only appeared in Dōbutsu no Mori e+ (also known as Animal Forest e+): Fruity, Ketchup, and Shinabiru. However, most of the other duck characters have been featured in that game as well (except Drake, Gloria, Molly, and Quillson) and almost all of the duck characters that were in that game were also in the original Animal Crossing game (except Miranda).
- The NES video game Duck Hunt (1984) has unnamed ducks as an integral part of gameplay. By pointing the NES Zapper gun peripheral at the TV, the gamer shoots down ducks that fly across the screen. In Super Smash Bros. for Nintendo 3DS / Wii U and Super Smash Bros. Ultimate, the lone dog and a single, individualized duck from Duck Hunt appears together as a playable character. In the European version they are referred to as Duck Hunt Duo, and in the North American/Japanese versions eponymously as "Duck Hunt". This particular duck has thus since been referred to as "Duck Hunt Duck".
- In The Legend of Zelda: A Link to the Past, a duck provides the significant purpose of carrying the protagonist, Link, to 1 of 8 locations spread throughout the game world. This duck is unnamed, but due to being the pet of the Flute Boy and referred to in game only as a bird, it is referred to by fans as the Flute Boy's Bird.
- Several Pokémon species seem to be inspired by ducks, such as Farfetch'd, Psyduck, Ducklett and Quaxly.

== Ducks in other media ==
- Dolan, Dafty, Dasee, Hupu, Tupu, and Lupu, in The Uncle Dolan Show
- Duck from Don't Hug Me I'm Scared
- Pekkle from Sanrio
- Sonic Duck, monster from the card game Yu-Gi-Oh!
- Witzy, Suzy Ducken, and Jack Quacker, from Suzy's Zoo
- Oozora Subaru from Hololive's Second Generation
