= Diplosemaphora amphibola =

Scientific classification
- Kingdom: Animalia
- Phylum: Arthropoda
- Class: Insecta
- Order: Lepidoptera
- Family: Tortricidae
- Genus: Diplosemaphora
- Species: D. amphibola

Binomial name
- Diplosemaphora amphibola Diakonoff, 1982

Species of moth

Diplosemaphora amphibola is a moth of the family Tortricidae first described by Alexey Diakonoff in 1982. It is found in Sri Lanka.

The specific name amphibola is Greek, meaning "ambiguous".

== Description ==
Males have a wingspan of 8.5 mm (0.33 in). Male moths are easily recognizable by their black androconial patches on their hindwings. The head is light grey and the pale, ochre antennae have dark rings. The pedipalps are whitish, with an apex suffused with dark grey with a white upper edge. The whitish thorax is densely spotted with black. The abdomen is light brownish grey. The broad forewings are brownish grey with a curved costa. The apex of the forewing is nearly obtuse. The underside of each forewing has an oval jet-black patch. The forewing cilia are whitish with parting dark grey lines. The brownish-grey hindwing becomes darker towards its edge. It is faintly tinged with ochreous and dark grey dusting. The hindwing costa is white. Purple to black androconial scales are present on the males' hindwing, above and below the center. The scales become translucent along certain veins. The hindwing cilia are brownish grey with a darker subbasal band.

Females have a larger wingspan of 10–10.5 mm (0.39–0.41 in). Their colouration is similar to males, but their forewings lack the androconial patch. Their wings are more grey than males, with pale grey cilia with four parting lines. Female hindwings possess a very thin pecten along the cubital vein and the wing base is less translucent than males.
