= List of fictional ducks in animation =

This is a List of fictional ducks in animation and is a subsidiary to the List of fictional ducks and List of fictional animals. It is limited solely to notable duck characters who appear in various animated television shows and feature-length films. Characters that appear in multiple works shall be listed with their earliest appearance solely.

== A ==
Name	Show	Studio	Notes
Abigail "Abby" Mallard	Chicken Little	Walt Disney Pictures	Chicken Little's best friend.
Ahiru	Princess Tutu	Hal Film Maker	A friendly, kind-hearted duck who was turned into a pre-teen girl by Drosselmeyer by a magical pendant. Like a duck, she is easily excitable, clumsy, and talkative. If Duck removes the pendant or quacks while talking, she transforms back into a duck, and must touch water while wearing the pendant to return to her human form.
Alfred Kwak	Alfred J. Kwak	Telescreen	He is very concerned with other people and values many virtues, like human rights and good manners. Friends, family and the environment, are also close to his heart and he in some episodes even risks his own safety when it comes to do the right thing.
April Duck	House of Mouse (cameo)	Disney	One of the three nieces of Daisy Duck, she is a member of the Junior Chickadees.

== B ==
Name	Show	Studio	Notes
Baby Ducks	Regular Show	Cartoon Network Studios	Four ducklings who were found by Mordecai and Rigby in the episode "A Bunch of Baby Ducks". They also appear in the later episodes "Exit 9B", "A Bunch of Full Grown Geese", "Brilliant Century Duck Crisis Special", and "A Regular Epic Final Battle".
Baby Huey	Noveltoons	Paramount Pictures	He is a gigantic and naïve duckling cartoon character. He was created by Martin Taras for Paramount Pictures' Famous Studios, and became a Paramount cartoon star during the 1950s.
Bill	Sitting Ducks	Sitting Ducks Productions	An anthropomorphic diminutive duck who waddles to a different beat. A very kind-hearted, good-natured fellow who is always there when needed.
Blade	Leafie, a Hen into the Wild	Myung Films	A male mallard duck who competed in the guard duck race and often bullied Greenie, During the race he tried to blind Greenie with sand but Greenie came back and told him something is in front of him which made Blade crash into a tree.
Buhdeuce	Breadwinners	Nickelodeon Animation Studio	A short, round, anthropomorphic, neon green duck and SwaySway's partner in bread delivery.
Bully	Leafie, a Hen into the Wild	Myung Films	Another male mallard duck who is huge and very tough, He competed in the guard duck race he tried to take down Greenie in the water but was pushed into the water by Greenie and was last seen before Greenie said his farewell to Leafie.

== C ==
Name	Show	Studio	Notes
Carue	One Piece	Production I.G	Nefertari Vivi's pet super spot-billed duck who is the leader of the Super Spot-Billed Duck Squad in Alabasta.
Count Duckula	Dangermouse, Count Duckula	Cosgrove Hall Films	He is a short green duck with black parted hair and the traditional vampire evening wear complete with cape. He has no fangs.

== D ==
Name	Show	Studio	Notes
Daffy Duck	Looney Tunes	Warner Bros.	A black duck with a white neck-ring and orange legs and beak. His name is derived from the fact that he behaves in a daffy way.
Daisy Duck	Donald Duck	Disney	Has large eyelashes and ruffled tail feathers to suggest a skirt. She is often seen wearing a hair bow, blouse, and shoes. Daisy usually shows a strong affinity towards Donald, although she is often characterized as being more sophisticated than him.
Danger Duck	Loonatics Unleashed	Warner Bros.	A Descendant of Daffy Duck
Darkwing Duck / Drake Mallard	Darkwing Duck	Disney	The title character and superhero of the series
Della Duck	DuckTales	Disney	The sister of Donald Duck and the mother of Huey, Dewey, and Louie; an adventurer whose absence serves as an overarching mystery in the series.
Dewey Duck	Donald Duck	Disney	One of three of Donald Duck's nephews, Dewey dresses in blue.
Donald Duck	Donald Duck	Disney	Donald is an anthropomorphic white duck with a yellow-orange bill, legs, and feet. He typically wears a blue sailor suit with a cap and a black or red bow tie. Donald is most famous for his semi-intelligible speech and his mischievous and irritable personality.
Dol, Mee, Rae and Toe	Leafie, a Hen into the Wild	Myung Films	Four small white ducks who are two pairs of twins (Dol and Toe being one pair of twins and Mee and Rae being the other pair of twins). They are clumsy and weird and like singing songs about themselves and like following the leader. After discovering Rooster's comb was a fake, Mee took it and played around with it.
Doris the Duck	64 Zoo Lane	Zoo Lane Productions, Ltd	A yellow duck who is friends with Kevin the Crocodile and Toby the Turtle. Her attitude in character can either be bossy or irresponsible. Sometimes, Doris can annoy other animals such as making duck quacks.
Duck	Almost Naked Animals	9 Story Media Group	A Tan-colored duck who does every random job and tries anything to get it done.
Duck	Sarah & Duck	Karrot Entertainment	A seemingly domesticated duck styled loosely after a wild mallard. Excitable and occasionally bad-tempered, Duck accompanies Sarah on her adventures. Unlike a real mallard, Duck suffers no adverse effects from bread and bread products, which he consumes with considerable gusto.
Ducks	Thumbelina	Don Bluth Entertainment	Ducks that sing the song Thumbelina in the beginning of the film along with the other farm animals, most notably the one female duck who sings the first line. The ducks are seen in later in the film around the part where Thumbelina's mother starts to sing Soon (Reprise).
Duck	Word World	The Learning Box	A yellow duck who is shaped like the word "Duck", similarly to how the other animals are shaped like the words they represent. He is one of the two main protagonists and is Frog's friend.
Ducky Lucky	Chicken Little	Jam Handy	A Duck from the Farm. Their names are Chicken Little, Cocky Locky and Foxy Loxy. One of them is always laying eggs even though he is male.

== E ==
Name	Show	Studio	Notes
Eggy	The Penguins of Madagascar	Nick Studios	A duckling who the penguins once "egg-sitted" in "Paternal Egg-Stinct". In the episode "Hard Boiled Eggy", the penguins learn that because they influenced him while inside the egg, Eggy had all their commando strengths combined.
Eric Duckman	Duckman	Klasky Csupo	A lazy, incompetent, self-serving, morally unscrupulous, sexual deviant.

== F ==
Name	Show	Studio	Notes
Fred Duck	Garfield and Friends	Film Roman, Paws, Inc.	A highly annoying flying duck.
Flock Leader	Leafie, a Hen into the Wild	Myung Films	A wise mallard who acts as the leader of the flock.

== G ==
Name	Show	Studio	Notes
Geextah	X-DuckX	Alphanim	A little hot head and the brains of the duo. He is highly emotional, very suspicious but a little more "clever" than his friend, Slax.
Greenie	Leafie, A Hen into the Wild	Myung Films	The male protagonist of the film. Orphaned as a duckling after his mother a female white duck and his father Wanderer were tragically killed by One-eye the Weasel, he is raised by a hen, Leafie. Courageous, stubborn and goodhearted, he takes after his adoptive mother in more ways than one.

== H ==
Name	Show	Studio	Notes
Hamsa	Shingeki no Bahamut	MAPPA	A duck noble a member
Huey Duck	Donald Duck	Disney	One of three of Donald Duck's nephews and a member of the Junior Woodchucks, Huey dresses in red.

== L ==
Name	Show	Studio	Notes
Launchpad McQuack	DuckTales	Disney	Scrooge McDuck's pilot, and an original DuckTales character. He is an able flyer, but is somewhat incompetent and rarely ever lands a plane safely, usually crashing them and walking away without injury. Later becomes Darkwing Duck's sidekick in his series.
Louie Duck	Donald Duck	Disney	One of three of Donald Duck's nephews and a member of the Junior Woodchucks, Louie dresses in green.
Le Quack	Courage the Cowardly Dog	Wang Film	A French con artist duck. He is the show's second most recurring villain, second only to Katz.
Louis T. Duck	Charlie Chalk	Woodland Animations	One of Charlie Chalk's friends.
Ludwig Von Drake	DuckTales	Disney	Named after either Ludwig von Mises or Ludwig van Beethoven. He is described as a scientist, lecturer, psychologist, and road traveler. The character displayed his "expert" knowledge on a variety of subjects in eighteen episodes of the classic anthology series

== M ==
Name	Show	Studio	Notes
Mad Ducks	Toucan Tecs	Cartwn Cymru, S4C, Yorkshire Television	The main enemies of the Toucan Tecs, commanded by The Red Leader.
Mandarin Duck Family	Leafie, a Hen into the Wild	Myung Films	A family of Mandarin ducks who live in the everglades. When Greenie attempted to make friends with them they teased him about his mother Leafie. Greenie threw some flowers at them but their mother picked them off and flew off. Later they had a concern over Leafie along with the other everglade birds.
Melissa Duck	Looney Tunes	Warner Bros.	Daffy Duck's girlfriend
Ming-Ming Duckling	Wonder Pets	Nick Jr.	At age 3, Ming-Ming is an overconfident young duckling. As a superhero girl, she wears a leather pilot's helmet, goggles, and a green cape.
Ms. Duck	Skunk Fu!	Cartoon Saloon	A wise old bird with a few moves up her feathers. Like Panda, she knows the back story of Dragon. She also is gifted at making food and dim sum fu. She seems to have a horrible singing voice. She, Fox, and Crane taught Skunk the art of using fans.

== N ==
Name	Show	Studio	Notes
Newton Duck	Garfield and Friends	Film Roman, Paws, Inc.	A duck with a very bad and dangerous memory .

== O ==
Name	Show	Studio	Notes
Oliver	Agatha Christie's Great Detectives Poirot and Marple	NHK	Jane Marple Nephew Raymond West's Daughter Maybelle pet duck

== P ==
Name	Show	Studio	Notes
Pato	Pocoyo	Cosgrove-Hall Films	A yellow duck who wears nothing but a small green hat. He has a fondness for gardening, and is often seeing watering plants and flowerbeds. Pato means duck in Spanish, Portuguese, Filipino, Tok Pisin and Papiamento.
Plucky Duck	Tiny Toon Adventures	Warner Bros.	A green duck modeled after Daffy Duck

== Q ==
Name	Show	Studio	Notes
Quack	Peep and the Big Wide World	9 Story Entertainment	A purple duck that wears a white sailor's hat and is one of the main characters.
Quacula	Heckle & Jeckle	Filmation	A pale blue duck with a Daffy Duck-like beak and fangs, dressed in a blue jacket and a black cape with a red lining.
Quacker	Tom & Jerry	MGM	Quacker talks a lot compared to Tom and Jerry. In many episodes, he is the only one who speaks. He's very trusting, even trusting Tom in many situations in which Tom wishes to eat him.
Quack-Up	Yogi's Space Race	Hanna-Barbera	Quack-Up is the crazy and clumsy pilot of the team while Huckleberry Hound just rests at the top of their ship. They are also members of the "Galaxy Goof-Ups".
Queer Duck	Queer Duck	Mondo	A gay anthropomorphic duck who works as a nurse.

== R ==
Name	Show	Studio	Notes
Red Head	Leafie, A Hen into the Wild	Myung Films	Red Head is a male mallard who competed against Greenie as a rival in a guard duck race at first he bullied him, but however after Greenie won the race Red Head decided to accept him as a friend.

== S ==
Name	Show	Studio	Notes
Scrooge McDuck	DuckTales	Disney	Scrooge is a wealthy Scottish business magnate and tycoon. He was in his first few appearances characterized as a greedy miser and antihero (as Charles Dickens' original Scrooge was), but in later comics and animated shorts and the modern day he is more often portrayed as a charitable and thrifty hero, adventurer, explorer and philanthropist
Sean	The First Snow of Winter	Link Entertainment	A lone young duck who has to fend for himself when he misses the duck migration.
Slax	X-DuckX	Alphanim	Slax, unlike his friend Geextah is very awkward. He often told his friend-against whatever the topic between them. The ducks love to innovate in sports and sometimes invent some cars and artillery to be on top of extreme. Slax is a little emotional but very jealous.
Sonia	Peter and the Wolf	Disney	She is very funny and quackative for a duck and a close friend to Sasha the bird.
SwaySway	Breadwinners	Nickelodeon Animation Studio	A tall, thin, neon green, anthropomorphic duck who comes from a line of bread delivery ducks, or "Breadwinners".

== T ==
Name	Show	Studio	Notes
Taipoca	Tsuritama	noitaminA	A Yuki Sanada owner duck
Tina Russo	The Looney Tunes Show	Warner Bros.	a daffy girlfriends trouble

== W ==
Name	Show	Studio	Notes
Wade Duck	Garfield and Friends	Film Roman, Paws, Inc.	A cowardly duck who wears a rubber flotation tube, and has a bunch of phobias no matter how trivial. As a gag, the head on his flotation tube copies nearly every movement and appearance change Wade's real head does.
Wil	Wil Cwac Cwac	McFall Middelboe Animation	A duckling who gets into trouble in the farmhouse.
Wanderer	Leafie, A Hen into the Wild	Myung Films	A male mallard duck who make's friend's with Leafie after his enemy the One-eyed Weasel tries to kill Leafie and saves her, Leafie begins to have a crush on him, Until he actually already has a mate but after the One-eyed Weasel kills her, He decides to pick Leafie to protect his egg while fighting the Weasel for revenge, Until one day he tells Leafie to take his unborn child to the everglades nearby When she asks why, he says "you will find out in time, During a moonrise One-eye comes back, Wanderer wanting to protect Leafie and his unborn child He fights with the weasel, But is overpowered and during a struggle over a cliff he falls with the Weasel`s jaws on his foot and tragically dies, Although Mr. Otter tells Leafie about his past which he was a guard duck, During his first fight with the Weasel she crippled his right wing and while he tore out the weasel`s eye his flock left him behind and he was captured by the farmer of the chicken farm and has held in the yard but managed to escape, Leafie solves the answer Wanderer told her before he died.
Wanderer's Mate/Greenie's Mother	Leafie, A Hen into the Wild	Myung Films	A female white duck who was Wanderer's Mate and Greenie's Mother, She took care of Greenie as an egg. But was killed by One-eye the Weasel and leaving Leafie to take care of her child.

== Y ==
Name	Show	Studio	Notes
Yabba	Timmy Time	WGBH-TV, Aardman	The Duckling. She is very similar to Timmy in personality and very friendly with him. Yabba's noise is quack.
Yakky	Yakky Doodle	Hanna-Barbera	Yellow duckling, the same character as Quacker.

== Unsorted ==
- Dáithí Lacha ("David Duck"), an Irish-speaking cartoon duck with an eponymous show on Irish television station RTÉ.
- Canard Thunderbeak, Check "Grin" Hardwing, Duke L'Orange, Mallory McMallard, Nosedive Flashblade, Tanya Vanderflock, Wildwing Flashblade - The Mighty Ducks: superhero ducks from Disney's The Mighty Ducks
- Everett Ducklair - A main character duck from PKNA
- Flick Duck, from the TV show PB&J Otter
- Stephan Vladuck/Camera 9 and Urk - minor duck characters from PKNA
