= Halo 2600 =

2010 action-adventure game

- Publisher: AtariAge
- Designer: Ed Fries
- Platform: Atari 2600
- Release: July 2010
- Genre: Action-adventure
- Mode: Single player

Halo 2600 is a 2010 action-adventure game developed by Ed Fries and published by AtariAge for the Atari 2600, a video game console released in 1977 that ended production in 1992. Inspired by the Halo video game series, the game sees players control Master Chief and fight through 64 screens with varied enemies. Completing the game once unlocks a tougher "Legendary" mode.

Halo 2600 was written by Ed Fries, former vice president of game publishing at Microsoft, who was involved in Microsoft's acquisition of Halo developers Bungie. Fries enjoyed the creative problems involved with creating a game with extreme technical constraints. Upon release, the game was generally well-received, and was selected for inclusion in a Smithsonian American Art Museum exhibit.

== Gameplay ==
Gameplay screenshot

Halo 2600 is an action-adventure shooter video game, with gameplay inspired by the Atari titles Adventure and Berzerk; it plays as a "demake" of the Halo video games as if they were created for the Atari 2600. The player uses the joystick to control the character of Master Chief, the protagonist of the Halo video games, as he makes his way through 64 screens, divided into four zones: outdoors, Covenant base, ice world, and a final boss area. Weapons and power-ups are available to combat the many enemies that appear. The player and enemies can each be killed by one hit, unless a shield is collected. The player has three lives. After successfully completing the game once, the player can play through the game in "Legendary mode", with the game tweaked for an extra challenge.

== Development ==
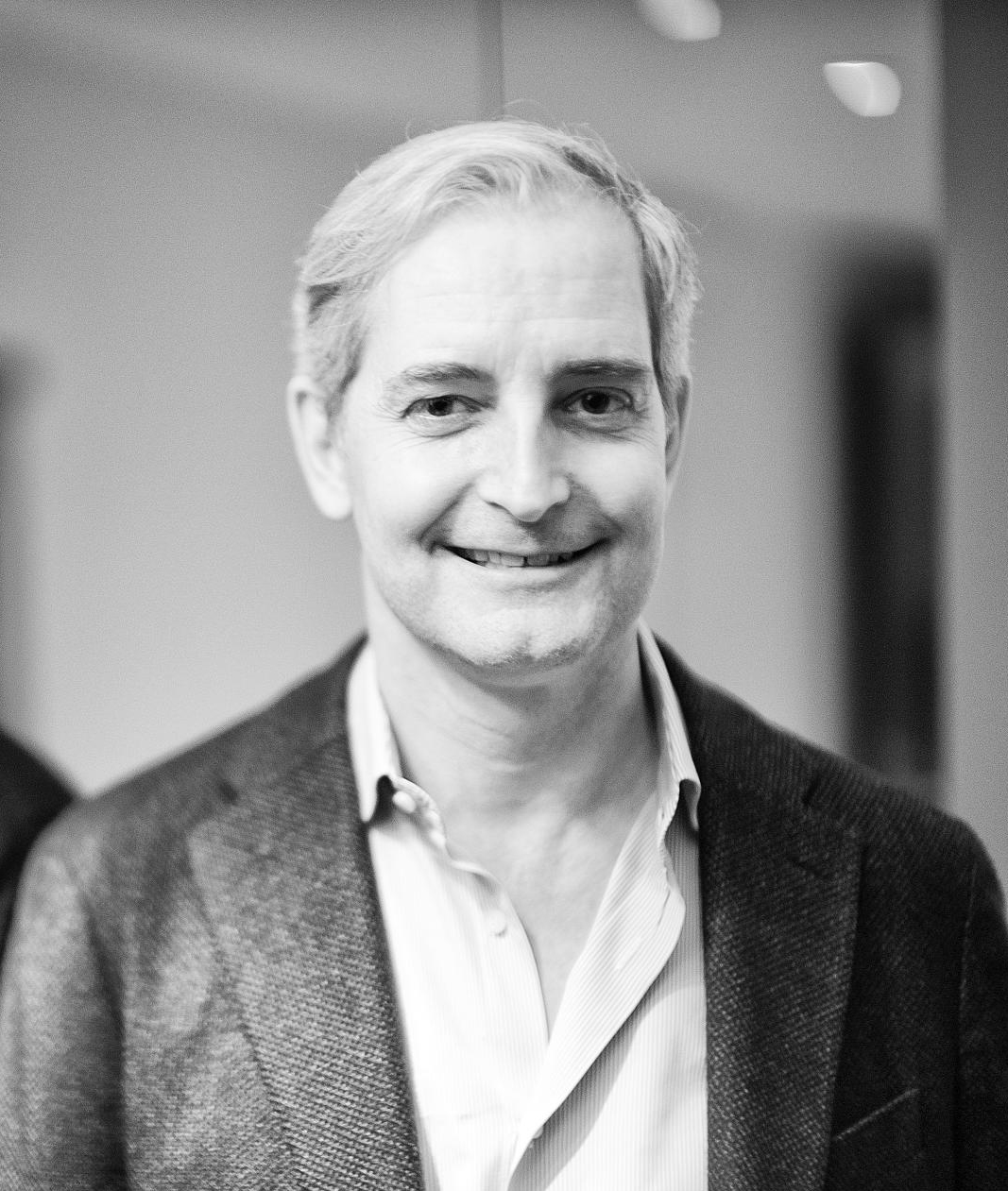
Ed Fries in 2015

Ed Fries got a taste of game development in his teenage years, developing Atari 800 games at home. Fries took a summer internship with Microsoft in college and eventually joined the company. In 2000, he was head of Microsoft Game Studios, trying to develop a launch lineup for Microsoft's unproven Xbox console. After being contacted by developer Bungie's vice president about a possible acquisition, Fries shepherded Microsoft's purchase of Bungie and their developing project, a game that would become the Xbox's killer app, Halo: Combat Evolved. Fries left Microsoft in January 2004, after 18 years with the company.

Fries read the book Racing the Beam: The Atari Video Computer System by Ian Bogost and Nick Montfort, which is about programming for the Atari 2600, and was inspired to create his own game. Initially, Fries only intended to recreate the Master Chief, but decided to finish the project after encouragement. He was aided by an extensive community of homebrew enthusiasts, where he found emulators, example code, and documentation. Despite having been released in 1977 and ending production in 1992, the Atari 2600 retained a dedicated hobbyist industry who still bought and played classic games.

Fries had not programmed in assembly in thirty years, and found the challenge in developing Halo 2600 one of adapting to constraints. The Atari 2600 has much less space and memory than was available for Halo. With only 128 bytes of RAM, drawing Master Chief was difficult, and creating a game with other characters even more so. Fries later stated that making the game taught him that constraint is sometimes a fuel for creativity, comparing the process of adapting Halo to the effort in turning a novel into a poem or haiku. "It felt more like writing poetry than it did like writing regular code", he said. "It felt like everything had to be so tight, so perfect. If even one of these tricks didn't exist, if I didn't have this incredibly clever way of drawing this sprite, or if I didn't have this incredibly sick code for drawing the missiles, I wouldn't have been able to fit it in. I couldn't have made the machine do what I wanted it to do." Fries pointed to other artists' work such as Bach's fugues or elaborate origami as examples of deliberately setting constraints to create something more interesting. The full game takes up just 4 kilobytes of space.

== Reception and legacy ==
Reception

Review score
Publication	Score
Retro Gamer	83%

The game was released in July 2010 at the Classic Gaming Expo. At the exposition, a limited number of physical copies of the game were on sale. It was one of four new Atari 2600 titles released by AtariAge at the 2010 Classic Gaming Expo in Las Vegas, along with Duck Attack!, K.O. Cruiser (a boxing game) and a port of Sega's 1981 arcade game Turbo. The game was also made available for play on modern computers via an emulator.

Halo 2600 was generally well received. Kotaku's Owen Good and Destructoid's Conrad Zimmerman considered it an entertaining diversion, while 1UP.com called it a "technical marvel" for condensing Halo's core to such a small size and pushing the 2600 to its limits. The gameplay was called "rough" but "amazing" by John Biggs of TechCrunch, who cited the immense size constraints involved in creating the game. Zimmerman called the game's controls capable, and The Escapist's Andy Chalk highlighted the game's chiptune soundtrack. Anthony John Agnello, writing for The A.V. Club, noted the incongruity of seeing a "modern blockbuster" transformed into devolved version on the 2600's "aesthetically abrasive" hardware.

The source code of the game was used to create an 8-bit poster representation of Master Chief. The cartridge version was rereleased through AtariAge in 2013. In the same year, the Smithsonian American Art Museum added Halo 2600 to its "The Art of Video Games" exhibition.
