= Medieval Mayhem =

2006 video game

- Publisher: SpiceWare
- Programmer: Darrell Spice Jr.
- Platform: Atari 2600
- Release: 2006
- Genre: Action
- Modes: Single-player, multiplayer

Medieval Mayhem is a 2006 game developed for the Atari 2600 console as an updated version of the 1980 Atari, Inc. arcade video game Warlords. It was written by American developer Darrell Spice Jr. and released under his SpiceWare label. David Vazquez and Erik Ehrling provided graphics and music for the game, respectively. Warlords was first ported to the Atari 2600 in 1981 by game designer Carla Meninsky. Spice's version includes elements of the arcade version that were not included in the official 2600 port.

== Gameplay ==
Screenshot showing the "launch dragon"

Medieval Mayhem is an action game that features a king in each of the four corners of the screen. Each king is protected by a brick castle. The object of the game is to destroy the opponents' kings by breaking through the walls of the castle with a fireball. Up to four players can play simultaneously; each controls a shield in front of the castle. If there are fewer than four players, the remaining shields are controlled by the computer.

At the start of the game (and each round), a "launch dragon" appears and releases a fireball. As the game progresses, additional fireballs appear. A round is complete when three kings have been destroyed, leaving one remaining. The player with the surviving king wins the round, and a knight marches across the screen, carrying the banner of the winning player.

== Reception ==
In a review giving it a 90% rating, Retro Gamer wrote, "As simple a game as Medieval Mayhem is in concept, it provides a hugely entertaining multiplayer experience of immense longevity. The colourful graphics and chunky sound are mere icing on the cake of this excellent game, one that deserves to be a part of your collection."
