= Warlords (1981 video game) =

- North American arcade flyer
- Developer: Atari, Inc.
- Publishers: NA: Atari, Inc.; JP: Sega
- Designer: Roger Hector
- Programmers: Arcade; Norm Avellar; Greg Rivera; Atari 2600; Carla Meninsky
- Platforms: Arcade, Atari 2600
- Release: Arcade: NA: April 1981; JP: July 1981; Atari 2600; May 1981
- Genre: Action
- Modes: Single-player, multiplayer

Warlords is a 1981 action video game developed and published by Atari, Inc. for arcades; in Japan, it was distributed by Sega. The gameplay resembles a combination of Atari's earlier games Quadrapong (1974) and Breakout (1976), and has the player (or up to four players) attempt to destroy other castles in different corners of the screen by deflecting one or more fireballs with a shield. As with Pong and Breakout, players use paddle controllers to manipulate their shield.

Unlike most Atari arcade games of the time, Warlords began development as an Atari 2600 game that was later converted to an arcade game; the 2600 version was released shortly after the arcade version. The arcade version of Warlords came in both a two-player upright version and a four-player cocktail version. The game was considered a success, although a redesign for a smaller cabinet was necessary, as the large cabinet made it impossible to produce in large quantities and difficult to install.

== Gameplay ==
Warlords is a battle between four warlords, 1-4 of which can be controlled by the player(s). The objective is to destroy the three other castles while protecting one's own castle with a moving shield. Each castle is an L-shaped wall distinguished by a different color, each containing and protecting a Warlord icon (a crown for player-controlled Kings, a dark lord helmet for computer-controlled Black Knights). On the upright version, multiple players must cooperate as a team.

The weapons for accomplishing this are spinning fireballs which bounce off anything they touch and destroy chunks of a castle wall on contact. Fireballs can be caught, held, and thrown by shields for greater hitting force, via a "Power stone" button, but at the cost of slowly deteriorating the player's own walls. When an icon is destroyed it releases another fireball onto the playfield, traveling in the opposite direction of the killing shot. The first fireball is launched by a dragon, always at a human player. Subsequent fireballs, up to a maximum of four at once, appear after timeouts or when a warlord icon is destroyed. The last player with their icon intact is awarded a point bonus. A game ends when all human players are eliminated.

== Development and release ==
The game was conceived and designed by Atari graphic artist Roger Hector, originally under the name Kings in the Corner. After Hector presented his idea at an offsite brainstorming session for arcade games, the concept was adapted into Castles & Kings, an Atari 2600 game programmed by Carla Meninsky. An arcade counterpart, initially under the same name, was programmed by Norm Avellar and Greg Rivera; this version both added and changed certain features to make the game more suitable for arcades. The prototype of the arcade game was housed in a large, four-player cabinet, not unlike Atari's earlier Sprint 4 (1977); only two versions of this prototype were made. Both versions of the game had their names changed to Warlords for their final releases.

The arcade version came in both a two-player upright version and a four-player cocktail version. The upright version uses a black and white monitor and reflects the game image onto a mirror with a backdrop of castles, giving the game a three-dimensional feel. The upright version only supports up to two simultaneous players, who move through each level as a team. The cocktail version uses a color monitor and supports up to four players. Three- to four-player games are free-for-alls where the game ends as soon as one player wins. Single- and two-player games play identical to the upright version.

According to an internal memo, the arcade version of Warlords was slated for a field test beginning on September 5, 1980. Atari began shipping the game in North America in April 1981, and licensed it to Sega for distribution in Japan, where it was released in July 1981. The Atari 2600 version of the game was released in May 1981. According to Atari production numbers, 1,014 upright arcade units and 1,253 cocktail units were produced.

== Reception ==
Critical reception of the game was positive. Warlords won an award for "Best 'Pong' Variant" and an honorable mention for "Best Competitive Game" at the third annual Arkie Awards in 1982, where judges called it "something really new and different in 'Pong'-style designs" and said it "delivers plenty of on-screen excitement". Richard A. Edwards reviewed the Atari 2600 version of the game for The Space Gamer in January 1982, saying that "If you have a need for a multi-player game for your Atari, then that is it. But for one or two players, it'd be better to pass it up." A December 1982 review for the 2600 version in Games magazine called it a "lively combination of Pong and Breakout" that is "best with four players. [...] The computer is a fairly easy opponent because its attack patterns are predictable; human opponents are another story."

In 2009, Game Informer named Warlords the 25th best video game of all time; the staff called it the "original trash-talking four-player combat game," and felt that it held up years later.

== Legacy ==
Screenshot of the Xbox Live Arcade remake

In 2002, a 3D remake of Warlords was included in the Atari Revival pack, which also included the previously released Missile Command and Combat 3D remakes.

A port of Warlords, including a "remix" version, is included in Retro Atari Classics for the Nintendo DS. It allows multiplayer play through wireless. It was released on the Xbox 360 via Xbox Live Arcade on May 27, 2008, featuring a new special HD mode and Xbox Live Vision Camera support. The Xbox Live Arcade version was made available on Xbox One and Xbox Series X and S via backward compatibility on November 15, 2021.

The arcade and Atari 2600 versions of Warlords were made available on Microsoft's Game Room service for Xbox 360 and Microsoft Windows in June and December 2010, respectively.

A new version of Warlords was released on PlayStation Network on October 9, 2012, in North America and October 10, 2012, in Europe. It was also released on Xbox Live Arcade on November 14, 2012.

In 2004, Bryan Edewaard developed and published an unlicensed homebrew version of Warlords for the Atari 5200 and Atari 8-bit computers, named Castle Crisis. In 2006, Darrell Spice Jr. released Medieval Mayhem, a homebrew Atari 2600 game inspired by Warlords. In 2011, a Commodore 64 clone was released as Space Lords, supporting a four-player adapter.

In 1999, Working Designs included an eight-player remake of Warlords as an easter egg on the "Making of" disc in Lunar: Silver Star Story Complete. The remake is titled Lords of Lunar by Timon Marmex (Tim Trzepacz's stage name), and is accessed by pressing up, down, left, right, triangle and start as soon as the "Making of" video begins.
