= Ed Fries =

American video game executive

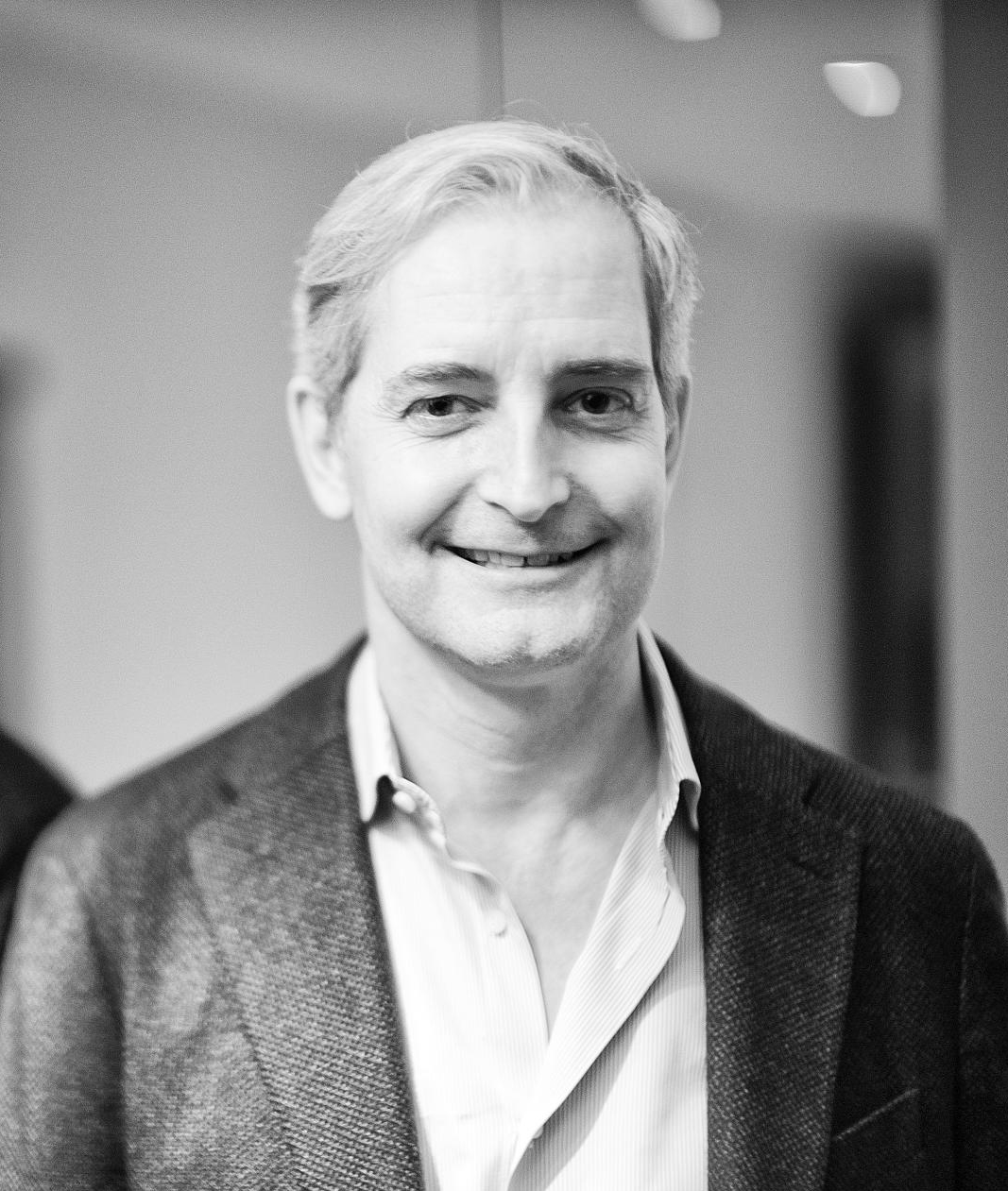
- Fries in 2015
- Born: Edward J. Fries; May 14, 1964 (age 62); Bellevue, Washington
- Occupations: Video game programmer; Entrepreneur
- Employer: Microsoft (1986–2004)
- Notable work: Halo 2600

Ed Fries (/ˈfriːz/ "freeze") (born May 14, 1964) is an American video game programmer and entrepreneur who was the vice president of game publishing at Microsoft during much of the Xbox's life-cycle.

== Early life ==
Fries fell in love with games while playing arcade games in the early 1980s. Both of his parents were engineers, and he sees in his love for games something similar to his father's love for airplanes while working at Boeing. As a teen he programmed a clone of Frogger for the Atari 8-bit computers which was distributed through bulletin board systems. It was seen by someone from game publisher Romox who offered him a job, and the game was published as The Princess and the Frog in 1982. Fries wrote two other games for Romox: Ant-Eater (similar to Dig Dug) and Sea Chase. Ant-Eater was reviewed by C&VG, who gave it a 7/10 for "getting started," and graphics, a 4/10 for value, and a 7/10 for playability.

Fries co-founded Tom & Ed's Bogus Software with Tom Saxton. They developed the original Fish! screensaver, which was later adapted by Berkeley Systems into the popular series of Aquatic Realm / Fish! After Dark screensaver modules.

== Microsoft ==
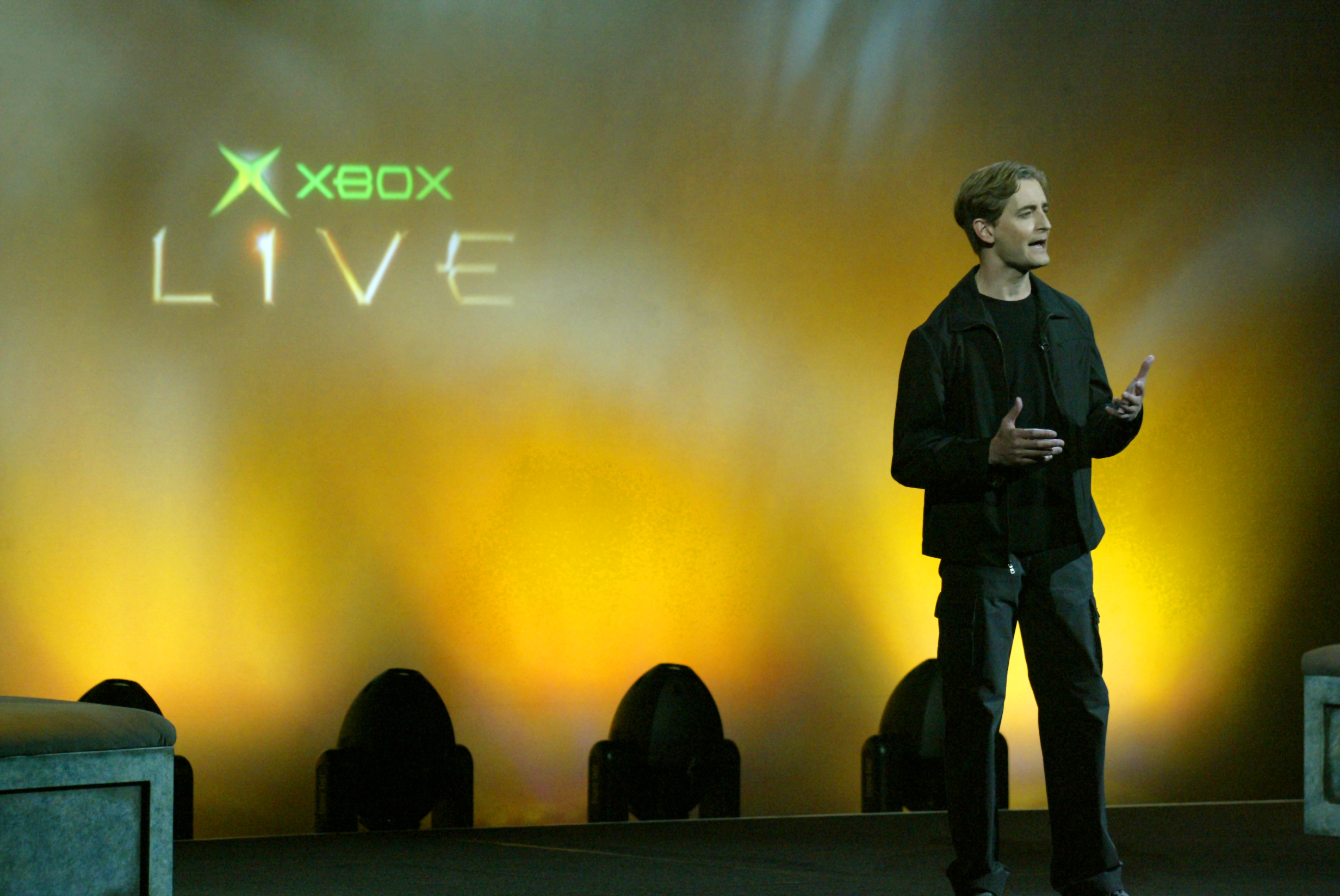
Ed Fries presenting at the Xbox E3 2003 media briefing.

After earning a B.S. in Computer Science from New Mexico Institute of Mining and Technology in 1986 Fries returned to the Seattle area to join Microsoft on productivity software. He has referred to this time as being like Ender's Game and says "We were recruited as children to fight in their wars, Excel vs Lotus 1-2-3 and Word vs WordPerfect." Ed Fries, as a Microsoft programmer early in his career, worked on software versions for the Macintosh, including Microsoft Word as part of his first assignment in the new team. He was the seventh and most junior member.

In the late 1990s he led the team that created the first version of the Xbox game console. He was a prime evangelist of the platform to game developers and had an important role in the acquisition of developers Bungie, Ensemble Studios and Rare.

== After Microsoft ==
Fries left Microsoft in January 2004. He consulted with a startup company, FireAnt, that was later sold to Sony Online Entertainment. He was also involved with several startups including Ageia, which aims to bring the first "physics accelerator" chip for games to market, and Emotiv Systems, a company building an EEG based game controller.

Fries is currently working on bringing his favorite game, World of Warcraft, to three-dimensional life with his startup company, Figure Prints. The company makes 3D models of a player's characters using a fleet of Z Corporation printers. Within the first 12 hours of his company going live, over 4,000 people had requested an order for a model. Fries explains in an interview that each model can take about one week to complete.

In July 2010, Fries released an Atari 2600 game inspired by the Halo series, called Halo 2600.

From 2012 until 2015 he was an advisor for the Ouya, an Android-based game console, as well as advisor for Animoca Brands and numerous other brands.

In 2019, Fries launched a game developer-focused venture fund entitled 1Up Ventures.
