= Pecten (biology) =

Comb-like structure in some animals

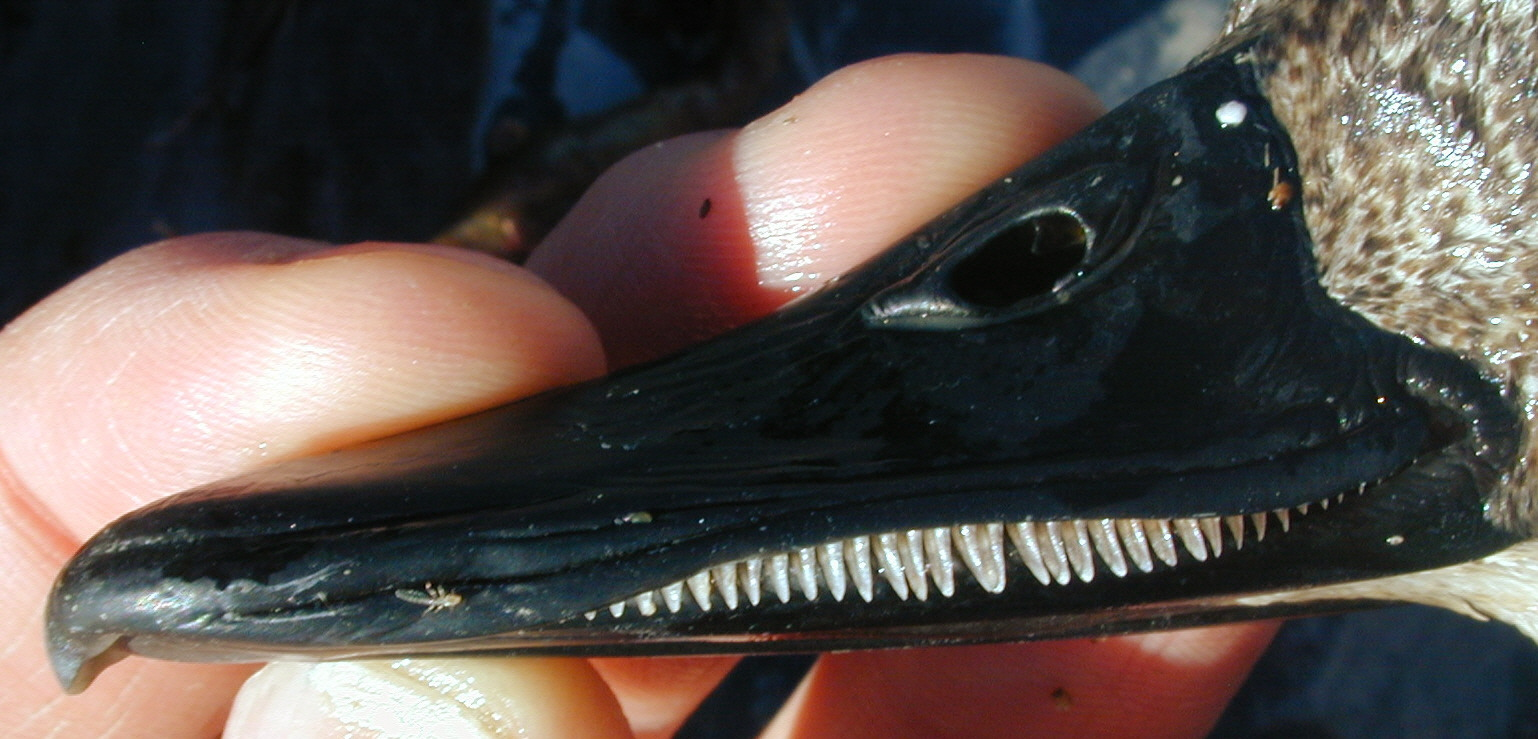
Pecten along a duck's beak

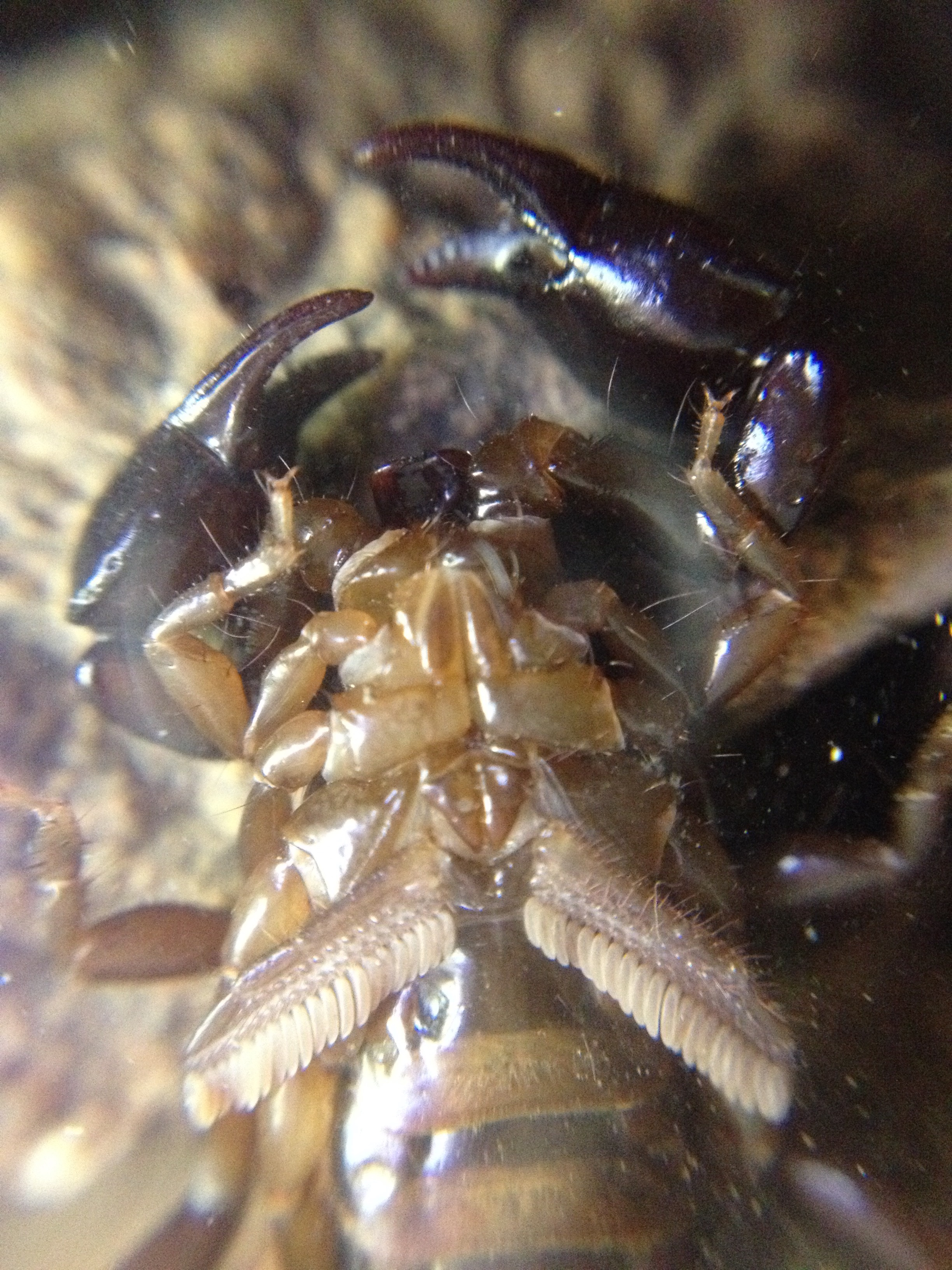
Ventral view of an unidentified scorpion species where the pectines can easily be observed. Pectines – the sensitive organs – have the inverted V shape in the image.

A pecten (pl.: pectens or pectines) is a comb-like structure, widely found in the biological world. Although pectens in various animals look similar, they have a varied range of uses, from grooming and filtering to sensory adaptations.

== Etymology ==
The adjective, pectinate, means supplied with a comb-like structure. This form, cognate to pecten with both derived from the Latin for comb, pectin (genitive pectinis), is reflected in numerous scientific names in forms such as pectinata, pectinatus or pectinatum, or in specific epithets such as Murex pecten. Some toothcombs are referred to as pectinations.

== Oral use ==
In ducks, they exist on the sides of the bill and serve both as a strainer for food and a comb for preening. Whales have a similar oral comb-like structure called baleen.

== Retinal use ==
The avian eye also contains a structure called a pecten oculi, which is a comb-like projection of the retina. It is thought to enhance nutrition for the cells of the retina.

== Sensory use ==
They also occur on the underside of scorpions, where they are used as sensory organs.
