= Duck Attack! =

2010 action-adventure video game

- Developer: Will Nicholes
- Publisher: AtariAge
- Designer: Will Nicholes
- Platform: Atari 2600
- Release: July 2010
- Genre: Action-adventure
- Mode: Single player

Duck Attack! is an action-adventure video game developed by Will Nicholes for the Atari 2600 console and published by AtariAge. The game was released at the July 2010 Classic Gaming Expo in Las Vegas.

== Plot ==
A mad scientist has created mutant, fire-breathing ducks that lay radioactive plutonium eggs. The player must collect the eggs to prevent the scientist from using them to build a doomsday device, while avoiding the ducks and other obstacles.

== Gameplay ==
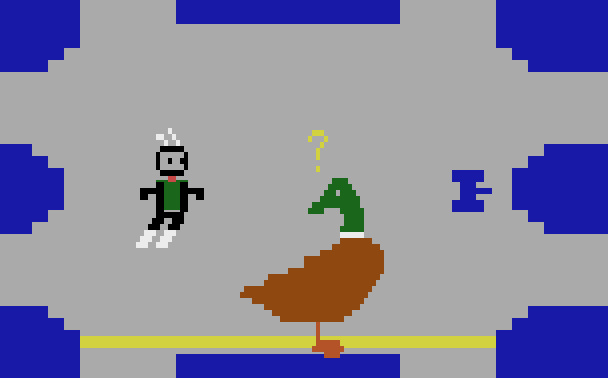
The player facing a duck and a tank

The player uses the joystick to control a robot that explores the scientist's lair, picking up eggs, weapons, and other useful objects. When two eggs are found and brought to the appropriate exit, the player advances to the next level.

The player starts with three lives (robots) and loses one when eaten by a duck or hit by the ducks' fire or another deadly object. Additional lives and various power-ups can be earned by picking up colored balloons. The player can play with all objects either in a predetermined location, or randomly distributed in the rooms.

== Development ==
Duck Attack! was initially conceived as a ROM hack of the Atari 2600 game Adventure, but was then rewritten as an original title. The game displays sprites that are larger and more detailed than commonly seen in Atari 2600 games, but with a lower vertical resolution.

== Reception ==
French retrogaming magazine Pix'n Love offered a positive review in a July 2010 issue, complimenting the game's originality and depth.

In April 2011, 1UP.com included Duck Attack! as one of "31 Homebrew Games Worth Playing", saying "It's like someone took Adventure and mixed it with Resident Evil 3. Only with more ducks."

The A.V. Club described the game as "an oddity: It's a wholly modern 2600 game that's actually fun and as awesomely weird as old 2600 games like Frankenstein's Monster."
