= Slash (punctuation) =

Slanting line punctuation mark (/)

/o

Slash or solidus
- In Unicode: U+002F / SOLIDUS (&sol;)

Related
- See also: U+005C \ REVERSE SOLIDUS

The slash is a slanting line punctuation mark, /. It is also known as a stroke or solidus, a forward slash and several other historical or technical names. Once used as the equivalent of the modern period and comma, the slash is now used to represent division and fractions, as a date separator, in between multiple alternative or related terms, and to indicate abbreviation.

== History ==
Slashes may be found in early writing as a variant form of dashes, vertical strokes, etc. The present use of a slash distinguished from such other marks derives from the medieval European virgule (Latin: virgula, lit. "twig"), which was used as a full stop (also known as a period), scratch comma, and caesura mark. These historical usages were lost over time, with its role as a full stop eventually being lost to the low dot (.), and the other two usages developing separately into distinct marks, the comma (,) and the caesura mark (||). Its use as a comma became especially widespread in France, where it was also used to mark the continuation of a word onto the next line of a page, a sense later taken on by the hyphen -. The Fraktur script used throughout Central Europe in the early modern period used a single slash as a scratch comma and a double slash // as a dash. The double slash developed into the double oblique hyphen ⸗ and double hyphen ⹀ before being usually simplified into various single dashes.

In the 18th century, the mark was generally known in English as the "oblique", particularly the less-vertical fraction slash. The variant "oblique stroke" was increasingly shortened to "stroke", which became the common British name for the character, although printers and publishing professionals often instead referred to it as an "oblique". In the 19th and early 20th century, it was also widely known as the "shilling mark" or "solidus", from its use as a notation or abbreviation for the shilling. The name "slash" is a recent development, not appearing in Webster's Dictionary until the Third Edition (1961) (Note: Nevertheless, the word was already being used in official publications, such as the 1947 style guide of the US Department of Agriculture Forestry Service.) but has gained wide currency through its use in computing, a context where it is sometimes used in British English in preference to "stroke". Clarifying terms such as "forward slash" were coined because MS-DOS and Windows use the backslash extensively.

== Usage ==
=== Disjunction and conjunction ===
==== Connecting alternatives ====
The slash is commonly used in many languages as a shorter substitute for the conjunction "or", typically with the sense of exclusive or (e.g., Y/N permits yes or no but not both). Its use in this sense is somewhat informal, although it is used in philology to note variants (e.g., virgula/uirgula) and etymologies (e.g., F. virgule/LL. virgula/L. virga/PIE. *wirgā).

Such slashes may be used to avoid taking a position in naming disputes. One example is the Assyrian naming dispute, which prompted the US and Swedish censuses to use the respective official designations "Assyrian/Chaldean/Syriac" and "Assyrier/Syrianer" for the ethnic group.

In particular, since the late 20th century, the slash is used to permit more gender-neutral language in place of the traditional masculine or plural gender neutrals. In the case of English, this is usually restricted to degendered pronouns such as "he/she" or "s/he". Most other Indo-European languages include more far-reaching use of grammatical gender. In these, the separate gendered desinences (grammatical suffices) of the words may be given divided by slashes or set off with parentheses. For example, in Spanish, hijo is a son and a hija is a daughter; some proponents of gender-neutral language advocate the use of hijo/a, hijo(a) or hija/hijo when writing for a general audience or addressing a listener of unknown gender. Less commonly, at sign ⟨@⟩ is used instead: hij@. Similarly, in German and some Scandinavian and Baltic languages, Sekretär refers to any secretary and Sekretärin to an explicitly female secretary; some advocates of gender neutrality support forms such as Sekretär/-in for general use. This does not always work smoothly, however: problems arise in the case of words like Arzt ('doctor') where the explicitly female form Ärztin is umlauted and words like Chinese ('Chinese person') where the explicitly female form Chinesin loses the terminal -e.

Although not as common as brackets, slashes can also be used for uncertain plurals such as "child/ren", "is/are", "book/s", "answer/s" or "fix/es".

==== Connecting non-contrasting items ====
The slash is also used as a shorter substitute for the conjunctions and and inclusive or (i.e., A or B or both), typically in situations where it fills the role of a hyphen or en dash. For example, the "Hemingway/Faulkner generation" might be used to discuss the era of the Lost Generation inclusive of the people around and affected by both Hemingway and Faulkner. This use is sometimes proscribed, as by New Hart's Rules, the style guide for the Oxford University Press.

==== Presenting routes ====
The slash, as a form of inclusive or, is also used to punctuate the stages of a route (e.g., Shanghai/Nanjing/Wuhan/Chongqing as stops on a tour of the Yangtze).

==== Introducing topic shifts ====
The word slash is also developing as a way to introduce topic shifts or follow-up statements. Slash can introduce a follow-up statement, such as, "I really love that hot dog place on Liberty Street. Slash can we go there tomorrow?" It can also indicate a shift to an unrelated topic, as in "JUST SAW ALEX! Slash I just chubbed on oatmeal raisin cookies at north quad and i miss you." The new usage of "slash" appears most frequently in spoken conversation, though it can also appear in writing.

==== In speech ====
Sometimes the word slash is used in speech as a conjunction to represent the written role of the character (as if a written slash were being read aloud from text), e.g. "bee slash mosquito protection" for a beekeeper's net hood, and "There's a little bit of nectar slash honey over here, but really it's not a lot." (said by a beekeeper examining in a beehive), and "Gastornis slash Diatryma" for two supposed genera of prehistoric birds which are now thought to be one genus.

=== Mathematics ===
==== Fractions ====
The slash is used between two numbers to indicate a fraction or ratio. Such formatting developed as a way to write the horizontal fraction bar on a single line of text. It is first attested in England and Mexico in the 18th century. This notation is known as an online, solidus, or shilling fraction. Nowadays fractions, unlike inline division, are often given using smaller numbers, superscript, and subscript (e.g., ^{23}/_{43}). This notation is responsible for the current form of the percent %, permille ‰, and permyriad ‱ signs, developed from the horizontal form 0/0 which represented an early modern corruption of an Italian abbreviation of per cento.

This notation can also be used when the concept of fractions is extended from numbers to arbitrary rings by the method of localization of a ring.

==== Division ====
The division slash ∕ is used between two numbers to indicate division. (Note: The ISO 80000 standard says that the division sign ÷, used in elementary schools in many Anglophone countries, "should not be used" to indicate division because in other countries it is used to indicate a range of values or negation.) This use developed from the fraction slash in the late 18th or early 19th century. The formatting was advocated by De Morgan in the mid-19th century, who wrote:

The occurrence of fractions, such as a/b, (a+b)/(c+d), in the verbal part of mathematical works is a source of considerable loss of room, and creates an inelegant and even confused appearance in the printed page. It is very desirable, in every point of view, except the strictly mathematical one, that some method of representation should be adopted which does not require a larger space than is usual between two successive lines. At the same time, it is by no means of very great importance that the verbal part should entirely coincide with the mathematical part in notation, so long as the latter remains to preserve the usual conventions. The symbol ÷ has been disused for a sufficient reason, namely, the number of times which the pen must be taken off to form it. This has been, and we imagine always will be, the cause either of abandonment or abbreviation. The question is, whether a new and easy notation could not be substituted; and it is desirable that it should be derived from analogy, such as (accidentally, we believe) does exist in >, =, and <. If we look at × and +, and observe that the first is made by turning the second through half a right angle, denoting multiplication, which is primarily an extension of addition in like manner as division is an extension of subtraction, we may thus invent the symbol / or \ (Note: DeMorgan's second proposed symbol is much less steep than a typical rendering of a backslash, the symbol chosen by this transcript as a typographical approximation thereof.) to denote division, which is also the symbol of subtraction turned through half a right angle. If a/b were used to denote a divided by b, and (a+b)/(c+d) to denote a + b divided by c + d, all necessity for increased spacing would be avoided; but this alteration should not be introduced into completely mathematical expressions, though it would be convenient in particular cases.

==== Quotient of set ====
A quotient of a set is informally a new set obtained by identifying some elements of the original set. This is denoted as a fraction $S / R$ (sometimes even as a built fraction), where the numerator $S$ is the original set (often equipped with some algebraic structure). What is appropriate as denominator depends on the context.

In the most general case, the denominator is an equivalence relation $\sim$ on the original set $S$, and elements are to be identified in the quotient $S/{\sim}$ if they are equivalent according to $\sim$; this is technically achieved by making $S/{\sim}$ the set of all equivalence classes of $\sim$.

In group theory, the slash is used to mark quotient groups. The general form is $G/N$, where $G$ is the original group and $N$ is the normal subgroup; this is read "$G$ mod $N$", where "mod" is short for "modulo". Formally this is a special case of quotient by an equivalence relation, where $g \sim h$ iff $g = hn$ for some $n \in N$. Since many algebraic structures (rings, vector spaces, etc.) in particular are groups, the same style of quotients extend also to these, although the denominator may need to satisfy additional closure properties for the quotient to preserve the full algebraic structure of the original (e.g. for the quotient of a ring to be a ring, the denominator must be an ideal).

When the original set is the set of integers $\mathbb{Z}$, the denominator may alternatively be just an integer: $\mathbb{Z}/n$. This is an alternative notation for the set $\mathbb{Z}_n$ of integers modulo n (needed because $\mathbb{Z}_n$ is also notation for the very different ring of n-adic integers). $\mathbb{Z}/n$ is an abbreviation of $\mathbb{Z}/n\mathbb{Z}$ or $\mathbb{Z}/(n)$, which both are ways of writing the set in question as a quotient of groups.

==== Combining slash ====
Slashes may also be used as a combining character in mathematical formulae. The most important use of this is that combining a slash with a relation negates it, producing e.g. 'not equal' $\neq$ as negation of $=$ or 'not in' $\notin$ as negation of 'element of' $\in$; these slashed relation symbols are always implicitly defined in terms of the non-slashed base symbol. The graphical form of the negation slash is mostly the same as for a division slash, except in some cases where that would look odd; the negation $\nmid$ of $\mid$ (divides) and negation $\nsim$ of $\sim$ (various meanings) customarily both have their negations slashes less steep and in particular shorter than the usual one.

The Feynman slash notation is an unrelated use of combining slashes, mostly seen in quantum field theory. This kind of combining slash takes a vector base symbol and converts it to a matrix quantity. Technically this notation is a shorthand for contracting the vector with the Dirac gamma matrices, so $A\!\!\!/ = \gamma^\mu A_\mu$; what one gains is not only a more compact formula, but also not having to allocate a letter as the contracted index.

=== Computing ===
The slash, sometimes distinguished as "forward slash", is used in computing in a number of ways, primarily as a separator among levels in a given hierarchy, for example in the path of a filesystem.

==== File paths ====
The slash is used as the path component separator in many computer operating systems (e.g., Unix's pictures/image.png). In Unix and Unix-like systems, such as macOS and Linux, the slash is also used for the root directory (e.g., the initial slash in /usr/john/pictures). Confusion of the slash with the backslash ⟨\⟩ largely arises from the use of the latter as the path component separator in the widely used MS-DOS and Windows systems.

==== Networking ====
The slash is used in a similar fashion in internet URLs (e.g., https://en.wikipedia.org/wiki/Slash_(punctuation)). Often this portion of such URLs corresponds with files on a Unix server with the same name, and this is where this convention for internet URLs comes from.

The slash in an IP address (e.g., 192.0.2.0/29) indicates the prefix size in CIDR notation. The number of addresses of a subnet may be calculated as 2^{address size − prefix size}, in which the address size is 128 for IPv6 and 32 for IPv4. For example, in IPv4, the prefix size/29 gives: 2^{32−29} = 2^{3} = 8 addresses.

==== Programming ====
The slash is used as a division operator in most programming languages while APL uses it for reduction (fold) and compression (filter). The double slash is used by Rexx as a modulo operator, and Python (starting in version 2.2) uses a double slash for division which rounds (using floor) to an integer. In Raku the double slash is used as a defined-or operator alternative to ||. A dot and slash ⟨./⟩ is used in MATLAB and GNU Octave to indicate an element-by-element division of matrices.

Comments that begin with /* (a slash and an asterisk) and end with */ were introduced in PL/I and subsequently adopted by SAS, C, Rexx, C++, Java, JavaScript, PHP, CSS, and C#. A double slash // is also used by C99, C++, C#, PHP, Java, Swift, Pascal and JavaScript to start a single line comment.

In SGML and derived languages such as HTML and XML, a slash is used in closing tags. For example, in HTML, <b> begins a section of bold text and </b> closes it. In XHTML, slashes are also necessary for "self-closing" elements such as the newline command <br /> where HTML has simply <br>.

In a style originating in the Digital Equipment Corporation line of operating systems (OS/8, RT-11, TOPS-10, et cetera), Windows, MS-DOS, some CP/M programs, OpenVMS, and OS/2 all use the slash to indicate command-line options. For example, the command dir/w is understood as using the command dir ("directory") with the "wide" option. No space is required between the command and the switch; this was the reason for the choice to use backslashes as the path separator since one would otherwise be unable to run a program in a different directory.

Slashes are used as the standard delimiters for regular expressions, although other characters can be used instead.

IBM JCL uses a double slash to start each line in a batch job stream except for /* and /&.

==== Programs ====
IRC, Discord, and many in-game chat clients use the slash to mark commands, such as joining and leaving a chat room or sending private messages. For example, in IRC, /join #services is a command to join the channel "services" and /me is a command to format the following message as though it were an action instead of a spoken message. In Minecraft's chat function, the slash is used for executing console and plugin commands. In Second Life's chat function, the slash is used to select the "communications channel" and send commands to it, for example if a virtual house's lights use channel 42 the command /42 on would turn them on.

The GEDCOM standard for exchanging computerized genealogical data uses slashes to delimit surnames; an example would be Bill /Smith/ Jr. Slashes around surnames are also used in Personal Ancestral File.

=== Electronics ===
A leading slash is one of several common conventions for indicating an active-low digital signal, which performs the named function when at a low voltage level. For example, dynamic random-access memory has active-low Chip Select, Row Address Strobe and Column Address Strobe signals, commonly written /CS, /RAS, and /CAS. This extends to signals which select between two options, such as "R/W", which indicates that the function is "read" when high and "write" when low. (Sometimes written as R/W̅ for greater clarity.

=== Currency ===
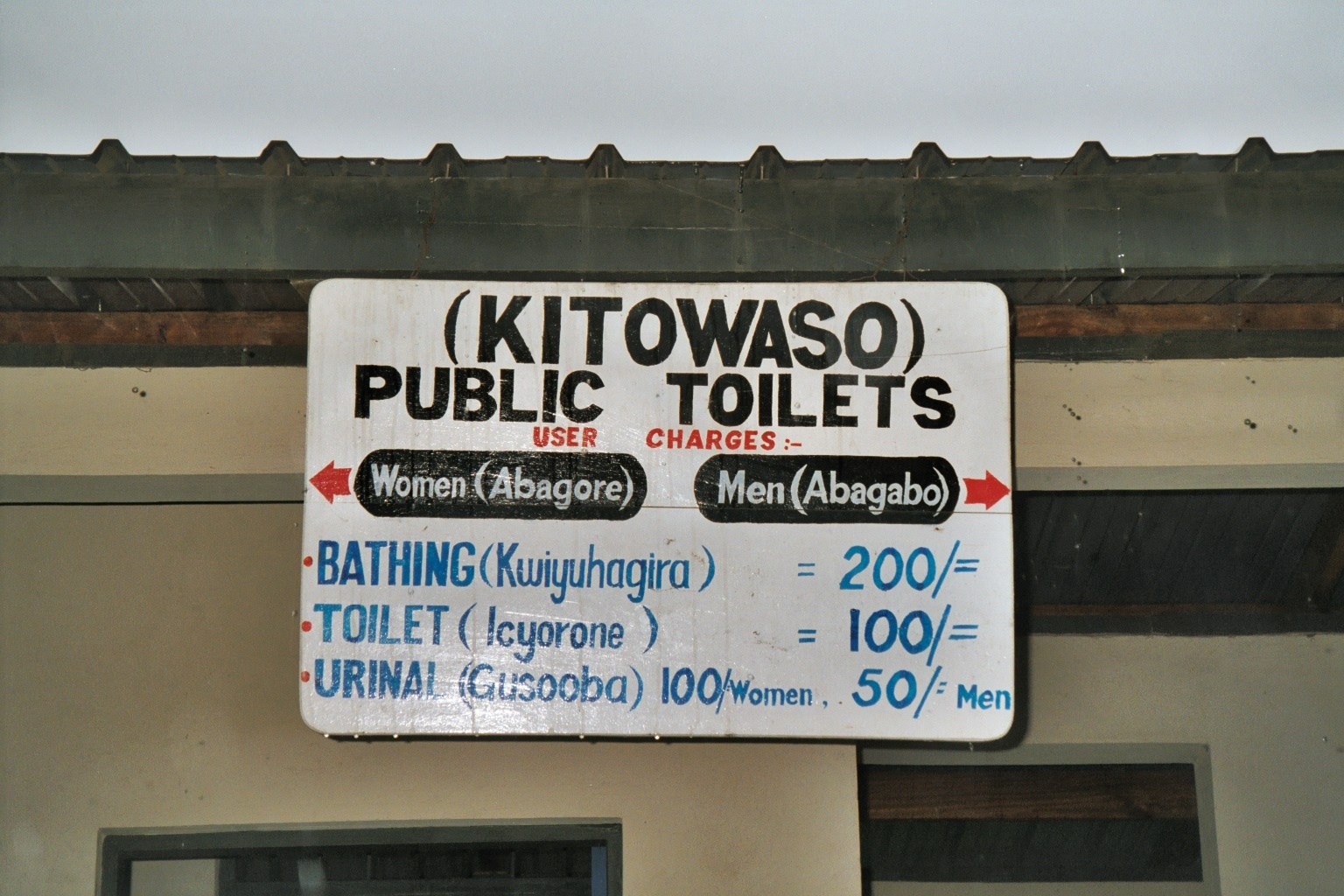
Sign in Kisoro with prices in Ugandan shillings; note the use of the '/=' notation.

The slash (as the "shilling mark" or "solidus") was an abbreviation for the shilling, a former coin of the United Kingdom and its former colonies. Before the decimalisation of currency in Britain, its currency abbreviations (collectively £sd) represented their Latin names, derived from a medieval French modification of the late Roman libra, solidus, and denarius. Thus, one penny less than two pounds was written £1 19s 11d or £1 19ſ 11d. During the period when English orthography included the long s, ſ or ſ, (abbreviating shilling) the ſ came to be written as a single slash. The d. might be omitted, and "2ſ6" ("two shillings and sixpence") became simplified as 2/6. Amounts in full pounds, shillings and pence could be written in many different ways, for example: £1 9s 6d, £1.9.6, £1-9-6, and even £1/9/6d (with a slash used also to separate pounds and shillings). The same style was also used under the British Raj and early independent India for the predecimalization rupee/anna/pie system.

In five East African countries (Kenya, Tanzania, Uganda, Somalia, and the de facto country of Somaliland), where the national currencies are denominated in shillings, the decimal separator is a slash mark (e.g., 2/50). Where the minor unit is zero, an equals sign is used (e.g., 5/=).

=== Dates ===
Slashes are a common calendar date separator used across many countries and by some standards such as the Common Log Format used by web servers. Depending on context, it may be in the form Day/Month/Year, Month/Day/Year, or Year/Month/Day. If only two elements are present, they typically denote a day and month in some order. For example, 9/11 is a common American way of writing the date September 11; Britons write this as 11/9. Owing to the ambiguity across cultures, the practice of using only two elements to denote a date is sometimes proscribed.

Because of the world's many varying conventional date and time formats, ISO 8601 advocates the use of a Year-Month-Day system separated by hyphens (e.g., Victory in Europe Day occurred on 1945-05-08). In the ISO 8601 system, slashes represent date ranges: "1939/1945" represents what is more commonly written in Anglophone countries as "1939–1945". The autumn term of a northern-hemisphere school year might be marked "2010-09-01/12-22".

In English, a range marked by a slash often has a separate meaning from one marked by a dash or hyphen. "24/25 December" would mark the time shared by both days (i.e., the night from Christmas Eve to Christmas morning) rather than the time made up by both days together, which would be written "24–25 December". Similarly, a historical reference to "1066/67" might imply an event occurred during the winter of late 1066 and early 1067, whereas a reference to 1066–67 would cover the entirety of both years. The usage was particularly common in British English during World War II, where such slash dates were used for night-bombing air raids. It is also used by some police forces in the United States.

=== Numbering ===
The slash is used in numbering to note totals. For example, "page 17/35" indicates that the relevant passage is on the 17th page of a 35-page document. Similarly, the marking "#333/500" on a product indicates it is the 333rd out of 500 identical products or out of a batch of 500 such products. For scores on schoolwork, in games, and so on, "85/100" indicates 85 points were attained out of a possible 100.

Slashes are also sometimes used to mark ranges in numbers that already include hyphens or dashes. One example is the ISO treatment of dating. Another is the US Air Force's treatment of aircraft serial numbers, which are normally written to note the fiscal year and aircraft number. For example, "85-1000" notes the thousandth aircraft ordered in fiscal year 1985. To indicate the next fifty subsequent aircraft, a slash is used in place of a hyphen or dash: "85-1001/1050".

=== Linguistic transcription ===
A pair of slashes (as "slants") are used in the transcription of speech to enclose pronunciations (i.e., phonetic transcriptions). For example, the IPA transcription of the English pronunciation of "solidus" is written /ˈsɒlɪdəs/. Properly, slashes mark broad or phonemic transcriptions, whereas narrow, allophonic transcriptions are enclosed by square brackets. For example, the word little may be broadly rendered as /ˈlɪtəl/ but a careful transcription of the velarization of the second L would be written [ˈlɪɾɫ̩].

In sociolinguistics, a double or triple slash may also be used in the transcription of a traditional sociolinguistic interview or in other type of linguistic elicitation to represent simultaneous speech, interruptions, and certain types of speech disfluencies.

Single and double slashes are often used as typographic substitutes for the click letters, ǀ and ǁ.

A diaphonemic transcription may be marked in several ways, e.g. with a pair of slash marks (⫽◌⫽).

=== Poetry ===
The slash is used in various scansion notations for representing the metrical pattern of a line of verse, typically to indicate a stressed syllable.

=== Line breaks ===
The slash (as a "virgule") offset by spaces to either side is used to mark line breaks when transcribing text from a multi-line format into a single-line one. It is particularly common in quoting poetry, song lyrics, and dramatic scripts, formats where omitting the line breaks risks losing meaningful context. For example, here is a part of Prince Hamlet's soliloquy:

To be, or not to be, that is the question:
Whether 'tis Nobler in the mind to suffer
The Slings and Arrows of outrageous Fortune,
Or to take Arms against a Sea of troubles,
And by opposing end them...

— Hamlet, Act II, Scene ii

If someone wanted to quote the above soliloquy in a prose paragraph, it is standard to mark the line breaks as follows: "To be, or not to be, that is the question: / Whether 'tis nobler in the mind to suffer / The slings and arrows of outrageous Fortune, / Or to take arms against a sea of troubles, / And by opposing end them..." Less often, virgules are used in marking paragraph breaks when quoting a prose passage. Some style guides, such as New Hart's, prefer to use a pipe | in place of the slash to mark these line and paragraph breaks.

The virgule may be thinner than a standard slash when typeset. In computing contexts, it may be necessary to use a non-breaking space before the virgule to prevent it from being widowed on the next line.

=== Abbreviation ===
The slash has become standard in several abbreviations. Generally, it is used to mark two-letter initialisms such as A/C (short for "air conditioner"), w/o ("without"), b/w ("black and white" or, less often, "between"), w/e ("whatever" or, less often, "weekend" or "week ending"), i/o ("input/output"), r/w ("read/write"), and n/a ("not applicable" or, in aviation, "not authorized"). Other initialisms employing the slash include w/ ("with") and w/r/t ("with regard to"). Such slashed abbreviations are somewhat more common in British English and were more common around the Second World War (as with "S/E" to mean "single-engined"). The abbreviation 24/7 (denoting 24 hours a day, 7 days a week) describes a business that is always open or unceasing activity. The slash is occasionally used for general omission in abbreviations, as in G/town for Georgetown, Guyana, though usually an apostrophe is used instead (as in C'ville for Charlotteville).

The slash in derived units such as m/s (metre per second) is not an abbreviation slash, but a straight division. It is however in that position read as 'per' rather than e.g. 'over', which can be seen as analogous to units whose symbols are pure abbreviations such as mph (miles per hour), although in abbreviations 'per' is 'p' or dropped entirely (psi, pound per square inch) rather than a slash.

In the US government, the names of offices within various departments are abbreviated using slashes, starting with the larger office and following with its subdivisions. For example, the Federal Aviation Administration's Office of Commercial Space Transportation is formally abbreviated FAA/AST.

=== Proofreading ===
The slash or vertical bar (as a "separatrix") is used in proofreading to mark the end of margin notes (Note: For an example of this in practice, see the section on proofreading marks in New Hart's Rules.) or to separate margin notes from one another. The slash is also sometimes used in various proofreading initialisms, such as l/c and u/c for changes to lower and upper case, respectively.

=== Business correspondence ===
In formal business correspondence, when a letter is typed by someone other than the person responsible for its contents, it is standard to add a suffix with the initials of the author (in upper-case), and typist (in lower-case) after the signature block, separated by a slash. For example, a letter typed by D.E. at the direction of A.B.C. would include the line "ABC/de".

=== Fiction ===
The slash is used in fan fiction to mark the romantic pairing a piece will focus upon (e.g., a K/S denoted a Star Trek story would focus on a sexual relationship between Kirk and Spock), a usage which developed in the 1970s from the earlier friendship pairings marked by ampersands (e.g., K&S). The genre as a whole is now known as slash fiction. Because it is more generally associated with homosexual male relationships, lesbian slash fiction is sometimes distinguished as femslash. In situations where other pairings occur, the genres may be distinguished as m/m, f/f, and so on.

=== Libraries ===
The slash is used under the Anglo-American Cataloguing Rules to separate the title of a work from its statement of responsibility (i.e., the listing of its author, director, etc.). Like a line break, this slash is surrounded by a single space on either side. For example:

- Gone with the Wind / by Margaret Mitchell.
- Star Trek II. The Wrath of Khan [videorecording] / Paramount Pictures.

The format is used in both card catalogs and online records.

=== Addresses ===
The slash is sometimes used as an abbreviation for building numbers. For example, in some contexts, 8/A Evergreen Gardens specifies Apartment 8 in Building A of the residential complex Evergreen Gardens. In the United States, however, such an address refers to the first division of Apartment 8 and is simply a variant of Apartment 8A or 8-A. Similarly in the United Kingdom, an address such as 12/2 Anywhere Road means flat (or apartment) 2 in the building numbered 12 on Anywhere Road.

The slash is also used in the United States in the postal abbreviation for "care of." For example, Judy Smith c/o Bob Smith could be used when Bob Smith is receiving mail on Judy's behalf. Typically, this would be used in a situation where someone is either out of town, in an institution or hotel, or temporarily staying at another's address.

In Spanish address writings, "c/" is used as the abbreviation of "calle" (or "carrer" in Catalan) meaning "street".

=== Music ===
Slashes are used in musical notation as an alternative to writing out specific notes where it is easier to read than traditional notation or where the player can improvise. They are commonly used to indicate chords either in place of or in combination with traditional notation, notably in the form of slash chords. For drummers, they find use as an indication to continue with a previously indicated style.

=== Sports ===
A slash is used to mark a spare (knocking down all ten pins in two throws) when scoring ten-pin and duckpin bowling.

=== Text messaging ===
In online messaging, a slash might be used to imitate the formatting of a chat command (e.g., writing "/fliptable" as though there were such a command) or the closing tags of languages such as HTML (e.g., writing "/endrant" to end a diatribe or "/s" to mark the preceding text as sarcastic). A pair of slashes is sometimes used as a way to mark italic text, where no special formatting is available (e.g., /italics/).

=== Before an e-signature ===
In legal writing, especially in a pleading, attorneys often sign their name with an "s" that is either enclosed by two slashes or followed by a single slash and preceding the attorney's name. An example would be the following:

/s/ Bob Smith
Attorney for Plaintiff

=== As a letter ===
The Iraqw language of Tanzania uses the slash as a letter, representing the voiced pharyngeal fricative, as in /ameeni, "woman".

== Spacing ==
There are usually no spaces either before or after a slash. According to New Hart's Rules: The Oxford Style Guide, a slash is usually written without spacing on either side when it connects single words, letters or symbols. Exceptions are in representing the start of a new line when quoting verse, or a new paragraph when quoting prose. The Chicago Manual of Style also allows spaces when either of the separated items is a compound that itself includes a space: "Our New Zealand / Western Australia trip". (Compare use of an en dash used to separate such compounds.) The Canadian Style: A Guide to Writing and Editing prescribes: "No space before or after an oblique when used between individual words, letters or symbols; one space before and after the oblique when used between longer groups which contain internal spacing", giving the examples "n/a" and "Language and Society / Langue et société".

According to The Chicago Manual of Style, when typesetting a URL or computer path, line breaks should occur before a slash but not in the text between two slashes.

== Unicode ==
Though the "ASCII slash" is a reserved character that is prohibited in Windows file and folder names, the big solidus is permitted (first box above). In this context, it is very similar to the slash (second box).

As a very common character, the slash (as "slant") was originally encoded in ASCII with the decimal code 47 or 0x2F. The same value was used in Unicode, which calls it "solidus" and also adds some more characters:

- U+002F / SOLIDUS (&sol;)
- U+0337 ◌̷ COMBINING SHORT SOLIDUS OVERLAY (for strikethrough)
- U+0338 ◌̸ COMBINING LONG SOLIDUS OVERLAY (for strikethrough)
- U+2044 / FRACTION SLASH
- U+2215 ∕ DIVISION SLASH
- U+2571 ╱ BOX DRAWINGS LIGHT DIAGONAL UPPER RIGHT TO LOWER LEFT
- U+29F8 ⧸ BIG SOLIDUS
- U+FF0F ／ FULLWIDTH SOLIDUS (fullwidth version of solidus)
- U+1F67C 🙼 VERY HEAVY SOLIDUS

=== Unicode fraction slash ===
A fraction automatically generated by the font from basic digits and the Unicode fraction bar, 123/456.

fraction slash is supposed to reformat the preceding and succeeding digits as numerator and denominator glyphs (e.g., display of "1, fraction slash, 2" as "½", and similarly "123, fraction slash, 456" as 123/456). This is supported by an increasing number of environments and computer fonts. Because support is not yet universal, some authors still use Unicode subscripts and superscripts to compose fractions, and many computer fonts design these characters for this purpose. In addition, precomposed fractions of the multiples less than 1 of ^{1}/_{n} for 2 ≤ n ≤ 6 and n = 8 (e.g. ⅔ and ⅝, as well as ⅐, ⅑, and ⅒, are found in the Unicode Number Forms or Latin-1 Supplement blocks.

Comparison table of fraction renderings (as implemented by your browser)
Normal slash	Division slash	Fraction slash	Pre-composed	Super-/subscript^{1}	Super-/subscript^{2}	LaTeX \frac
1/2	1∕2	1/2	½	¹/₂	^{1}/_{2}	$\frac{1}{2}$

^{1} With precomposed positions and sizes of the numbers, and normal slash
^{2} With positions and sizes of the numbers set by html, and normal slash

== Alternative names ==
Name	Used for
diagonal	An uncommon name for the slash in all its uses.
division slash	This is the Unicode Consortium's formal name for the variant of the slash used to mark division. (U+2215 ∕ DIVISION SLASH)
forward slash	A retronym used to distinguish slash from a backslash following the popularization of MS-DOS and Microsoft Windows, which use the backslash for paths in its file system. Less often forward stroke (UK), foreslash, front slash, and frontslash. It is possible even to see such back-formations as reverse backslash.
fraction slash	This is the Unicode Consortium's formal name for the low slash used to mark fractions. (U+2044 / FRACTION SLASH); Also sometimes known as the fraction bar, although this more commonly refers to the horizontal bar style, as in 1/2. When used as a fraction bar, this form of the mark is less vertical than an ASCII slash, generally close to 45° and kerned on both sides; this use is distinguished by Unicode as the fraction slash. (This use is sometimes mistakenly described as the sole meaning of "solidus", with its use as a shilling mark and slash distinguished under the name "virgule".)
oblique	A formerly common name for the slash in all its uses. Also oblique stroke, oblique dash, etc.
scratch comma	A modern name for the virgule's historic use as a form of comma.
separatrix	Originally, the vertical line separating integers from decimals before the advent of the decimal point; later used for the vertical bar or slash used in proofreader's marginalia to denote the intended replacement for a letter or word struckthrough in proofed text or to separate margin notes. Sometimes misapplied to virgules.
shilling mark	A development of the long S ſ used as an abbreviation for the (obsolete) British shilling (Latin: solidus), and also for some modern-day currencies (Kenya, Tanzania, Uganda and Somalia), where it acts as a decimal separator (between shillings and cents). The 'slash' is known as a "shilling stroke".
slant	From its shape, an infrequent name except (as slants) in its use to mark pronunciations off from other text and as the original ASCII name of the character. Also slant line(s) or bar(s).
slash mark	An alternative name used to distinguish the punctuation mark from the word's other senses.
slat	An uncommon name for the slash used by the esoteric programming language INTERCAL. Also slak.
solidus	Another name for the mark (derived from the Latin form of 'shilling'), also applied to other slashes separating numbers or letters, used in typography, and adopted by the ISO and Unicode as their formal name for the ASCII slash ("slant"). (U+002F / SOLIDUS) The solidus's use as a division sign is distinguished as the division slash.
stroke	A contraction of the phrase oblique stroke, used in telegraphy. It is particularly employed in reading the mark out loud: "he stroke she" is a common British reading of "he/she". "Slash" has, however, become common in Britain in computing contexts, while some North American amateur radio enthusiasts employ the British "stroke". Less frequently, "stroke" is also used to refer to hyphens.
virgule	A development of virgula ("twig"), the original medieval Latin name of the character when it was used as a scratch comma and caesura mark. Now primarily used as the name of the slash when it is used to mark line breaks in quotations. Sometimes mistakenly distinguished as a formal name for the slash, as against the solidus's supposed use as a fraction slash. Formerly sometimes anglicized in British sources as the virgil.

The slash may also be read out as and, or, and/or, to, or cum in some compounds separated by a slash; over or out of in fractions, division, and numbering; and per or a(n) in derived units (as km/h) and prices (as $~/kg), where the division slash stands for "each".

== See also ==
- A slash in the reverse direction \ is a backslash
- Strikethrough, including slashes through figures
- Feynman slash notation in physics, which employs slash-like strikethroughs
- Inequality sign, an equals sign with a slash-like strikethrough
