= U.S. Manga =

Brazilian television series

- Country of origin: Brazil

U.S. Manga or U.S. Manga Corps do Brasil was a Brazilian television show broadcast by Manchete TV starting in 1996.

== List of U.S. Manga shows ==
Title	No. of episodes (or films)	Runtime (per episode)	Animation studio(s)
Art of Fighting	1	45 minutes	Studio Comet
Battle Skipper	3	30 minutes	Tokyo Kids
Detonator Orgun	3	45–60 minutes	AIC
Fatal Fury	3	45–95 minutes	Studio Comet
Gall Force: Earth Chapter	3	45 minutes	AIC
Gall Force: New Era	2	45 minutes	AIC
Genocyber	5	30–45 minutes	Artland
Hades Project Zeorymer	4	30 minutes	AIC
Iczer Reborn	6	30 minutes	AIC
M.D. Geist	2	45 minutes	Production Wave; Zero-G Room
Samurai Shodown	1	70 minutes	Studio Comet
