= Biohazard 4D-Executer =

- Theatrical release poster showing the military squad members (from left to right) Ed, Norman, Robert, Roger and Claus

Japanese name
- Kanji: バイオハザード4Dエグゼキューター
Transcriptions
- Revised Hepburn: Baiohazādo 4 D eguzekyūtā
- Directed by: Koichi Ohata
- Written by: Daisuke Okamoto
- Produced by: Kenji Yoshida; Naoki Miyachi
- Starring: Masaki Aizawa; Hiroto Torihata; Hideto Ebihara; Tadasuke Omizu; Yoshiyuki Kaneko; Yurika Hino
- Cinematography: Shinji Higuchi
- Music by: Yoshihiro Ike
- Production company: Visual Science Laboratory
- Distributed by: Digital Amuse
- Release date: November 2000 (Japan)
- Running time: 20 minutes
- Country: Japan
- Language: Japanese
- Budget: ¥150 million (US$1.4 million)

Biohazard 4D-Executer (Japanese: バイオハザード4Dエグゼキューター, Hepburn: Baiohazādo 4 D eguzekyūtā) is a 2000 Japanese 3D animated biopunk horror film based on the Resident Evil series of survival horror video games. It was created by Capcom in cooperation with Visual Science Laboratory, and distributed by Digital Amuse. Biohazard 4D-Executer was directed by Koichi Ohata, and written by Daisuke Okamoto, who was supervised by the game series developers. A limited release, the 20-minute film was an attraction in Japanese theme parks debuting in November 2000, and could be seen in movie theaters and smaller booths.

The story centers on the mission of a military squad sent to the zombie-infested Raccoon City to locate the whereabouts of Dr. Cameron, a scientist conducting research on a new type of virus.

== Plot ==
In the Midwest of America, the citizens of Raccoon City have been transformed into zombies after becoming infected with the T-virus, a biological weapon secretly developed by the pharmaceutical company Umbrella. Members of the Umbrella Biohazard Countermeasure Service, a group specialized in containing biohazard outbreaks caused by Umbrella,—consisting of leader Claus (Masaki Aizawa) and his men Roger (Hiroto Torihata), Ed (Hideto Ebihara), Robert (Tadasuke Omizu) and Norman (Yoshiyuki Kaneko)—is sent into the city by the company. Their objective is to rescue Dr. Cameron (Yurika Hino), a scientist researching a new virus.

The squad tracks a signal from her ID card, and is drawn to a warehouse, where Robert is killed during a surprise attack from an unidentified monster. The team blows the creature to pieces, but is unaware of its ability to transfer its mind to other life forms. The squad leaves to chase Dr. Cameron's now-moving signal to a manhole, and the monster follows them in the body of a crow. Norman and Roger accompany Claus into the sewers, while Ed stands guard on the street. Underground, the team finds Dr. Cameron's equipment, and is attacked by a dog. After shooting the dog, they see the doctor's ID card attached to it. Roger, who is a higher-up within Umbrella, reveals to the others that the true purpose of their mission was not to rescue Dr. Cameron, but to collect her research data regarding a new virus capable of regenerating genes. She was infected with her creation, and mutated into the monster that the squad had fought at the warehouse.

While Claus, Norman and Roger return to the surface, Ed is killed by the crow, and transforms into a creature similar to the one in the warehouse. This new monster kills Norman, but Claus and Roger barely escape in a humvee, using a machine gun attached to the vehicle to destroy it. As the two men drive out of the city, Claus asks about the virus. Roger explains how it fuses with genes, enabling Dr. Cameron to regenerate her body in other life forms, and thus making her nearly immortal. Roger then impales Claus with tentacles, pinning him to the seat. At this point, Roger is revealed to have two faces, the second one being Dr. Cameron's. The researcher explains that she was watching them in the body of the dog while they were in the warehouse, and that she realized that Umbrella was pursuing her research data. Dr. Cameron tells Claus that he and his team turned out to be perfect guinea pigs for the virus she had created, and that she will continue her experiments, trying to return herself to a human form. Using tentacles, she rips Claus' face apart.

== Production and release ==
The concept for Biohazard 4D-Executer was originally conceived by anime director Yasuhiro Imagawa, who proposed his idea of the film to Capcom, the game company responsible for the Resident Evil series. The project was announced to the public in late October 1999, under the tentative title Biohazard 4D-Horror. In the early stages of development, Imagawa was responsible for the planning and the screenplay, and he collaborated on the film with director of photography Shinji Higuchi. The final script was written by Daisuke Okamoto, under the supervision of Capcom's screenwriting subsidiary Flagship. Former Capcom Production Studio 2 game designer and producer Keiji Inafune and Flagship co-founder Noboru Sugimura served as executive supervisors. Inafune referred to the story as a "gaiden"—or side-story—for fans of the Resident Evil series.

The film marked director Koichi Ohata's first experience with computer-generated imagery (CGI), after his previous work on original video animations such as MD Geist, Cybernetics Guardian and Genocyber. The CGI rendering was handled by the company Visual Science Laboratory, with the creature designs provided by 3D artist Gouta Nanami. Due to the strong graphic violence depicted, shorter versions of the 20-minute film were created, from which certain scenes were cut. Biohazard 4D-Executer is presented in 5.1 surround sound, and features music composed and orchestrated by Yoshihiro Ike. The film was produced with a budget of 150 million yen (approximately US$1.4 million in October 1999), and saw a first screening at the Tokyo International Fantastic Film Festival on October 27, 2000. A widespread release in Japanese theme park theaters followed in November 2000. The movie was previewed at the Digital Amusement Show in November 2000 with Inafune attending the event.

The film is shown in movie theaters for a large audience, and in single booths for a small number of viewers. For a more immersive presentation of the attraction, distributor Digital Amuse designed special cylindrical seats named "gimmick chairs", which can shake viewers and blow air on their necks.
