= Central Park Media =

Defunct US multimedia entertainment company

Central Park Media Corporation
- Central Park Media's logo, depicting the skyline of New York City in the background
- Type: Private
- Industry: Multimedia entertainment
- Genre: Anime, East Asian films, hentai, manga, manhwa, yaoi
- Founded: April 11, 1990
- Founder: John O'Donnell
- Defunct: April 27, 2009
- Fate: Chapter 7 bankruptcy
- Headquarters: New York City, New York
- Area served: United States and Canada
- Divisions: Asia Pulp Cinema; US Manga Corps; Software Sculptors; CPM Press; Anime 18; Below the Radar; Binary Media Works
- Website: centralparkmedia.com 2009 archive

Central Park Media Corporation, often abbreviated as CPM, was an American multimedia entertainment company based in New York City, New York and was headquartered in the 250 West 57th Street building in Midtown Manhattan (on the corner of Central Park, hence their name). They were one of the first companies to be active in the distribution of East Asian cinema, television series, anime, manga, and manhwa titles in North America, notably helping to make hentai popular in the region. Over its history, the company licensed several popular titles, such as Slayers, Revolutionary Girl Utena, the Tokyo Babylon OVAs, Project A-ko, and Demon City Shinjuku.

They had multiple divisions, each of which focused on offering different types of products and services. While a majority of their divisions handled anime and manga distribution, they also offered anime-related software and even ran a website for UFO conspiracy theorists.

CPM filed for bankruptcy on April 27, 2009, but remains nominally active as of July 3, 2023 without holding many of its former assets. Since their bankruptcy, many of their former titles have been re-released by other companies.

== History ==
=== Founding and growth ===
Central Park Media was founded in 1990 by John O'Donnell as an anime supplier. He was the former founder of Sony Video Software and he championed its first anime titles Tranzor Z and Voltron: Defender of the Universe. During its heyday, CPM incorporated MD Geist as part of its U.S. Manga Corps logo. Curiosity by anime fans seeing the "corporate spokes mecha" in CPM's titles resulted in MD Geist becoming one of the company's bestselling titles. In 1996, CPM commissioned MD Geist creator Koichi Ohata to write and direct a sequel; at the same time, Ohata made a director's cut of the first title, adding new scenes and expanding the storyline.

In 1992, CPM – through its Anime 18 division – released Urotsukidōji: Legend of the Overfiend, which became the first animated film to be given the NC-17 rating. Since its release, Urotsukidoji has become a cult classic among fans of anime, science fiction and horror genres, while at the same time, being one of the first anime titles to introduce the western public to the hentai genre. It was released in theaters across the United States in both subtitled and dubbed formats.

In the mid-1990s, CPM expanded to distributing manga and manhwa through CPM Manga and CPM Manhwa, respectively. CPM Manga also featured adaptations of MD Geist, Armored Trooper Votoms, and Project A-ko by American writers and artists.

Central Park Media headquarters was in the Fisk Building, located at 250 West 57th Street in Midtown Manhattan. They started out with just 3,400 square feet, but grew to 7,000 square feet in 1996 and would expand further to 10,000 square feet in January 2000. Through its history, the company has employed numerous figures in the video retail industry like Steven Kramer, Peter Castro, and Tom Reilly. In 2003, John Davis, Allen Rosenberg, and Stacey Santos were hired as account executives.

=== Financial problems ===
On May 26, 2006, Central Park Media laid off many of its employees, and rumors erupted that the company was planning to declare bankruptcy, supported by a statement from a representative at the convention Anime Boston. The following Monday, the company's managing director issued a statement acknowledging the lay-offs and attributing the cost-cutting to creditor problems following the January bankruptcy of the Musicland group.

The previous year, in 2005, CPM had discontinued its CPM Manga and CPM Manhwa line, also due to monetary problems. But CPM representatives have said that they had relaunched their manga and manhwa lines in January 2006.

On March 19, 2007, Japanese yaoi publisher Libre posted a notice on its website saying that CPM's Be Beautiful division was illegally translating and selling its properties. The titles in question were originally licensed to CPM by Japanese publisher Biblos, which was bought out by Libre in 2006 after a bankruptcy.

=== Bankruptcy and liquidation ===
Central Park Media filed for Chapter 7 bankruptcy on April 27, 2009, and liquidated with a debt of over US$1.2 million. Officially, the company had plans to re-release some older titles in the future. Right up until their bankruptcy, CPM still licensed their anime titles for North American television and VOD distribution, despite having not released anything on home video for over a year. Many of their titles have been shown on the Sci-Fi Channel, as well as Anime Selects, AZN Television and the Funimation Channel, and were available through iTunes. Some of their titles were also re-licensed by various anime companies, such as ADV Films, Bandai Entertainment, Funimation, Sentai Filmworks, Discotek Media, Nozomi Entertainment, and Media Blasters, and were re-released from 2004 into the present day. Some of their titles were either re-dubbed, such as Here Is Greenwood and Area 88 by Media Blasters and ADV Films, respectively, or have retained the original dub. Grave of the Fireflies was later re-licensed by ADV's successor Sentai Filmworks and was re-released in 2012.

Its website became offline permanently after its closure. The centralparkmedia.com domain was eventually transferred to a New York-based art dealer Atelier VGI several years later.

== Distribution ==
Central Park Media was a key player in popularizing anime, with numerous firsts and promotions designed to introduce various works to American viewers. They were one of the first suppliers to sell anime box sets.

In 2002, the first instance of an anime having the storyboards as an alternate viewing option was released on the Collectors Edition of Grave of the Fireflies, more than 2,700 hand drawings synced to the audio tracks. They also focused on increasing TV airings of shows to capitalize on the International Channel, the Encore Channel and the streaming service Cartoon Network short-lived Toonami Reactor website.

Anime Test Drive was a promotion that started in 2003 which tested the markets and introduced American's to anime at a discounted rate. It was a way to market titles that may have been viewed as to expensive or inconvenience to purchase separately. Anime Test Drive DVDs offer two episodes of the listed anime series and 45 minutes of trailers.

In 2004, Central Park Media introduced Korean animation works into America after the success of the Animatrix, Aeon Flux, and Cubix with the release of Doggy Poo. In 2005, it sub-licensed seven anime titles to the US-based International Channel. It also licensed titles out to the broadband streaming service Movielink. In 2006, Central Park Media licensed some of their works to IGN Entertainment's digital download retail store Direct2Drive.

In 2007, Central Park Media licensed out Revolutionary Girl Utena: The Movie, Roujin Z, the Record of Lodoss War series, the Project A-ko series, Urusei Yatsura: Beautiful Dreamer, and Grave of the Fireflies to the Funimation Channel. These titles aired on the channel in 2007 before ADV Films took over the rights to Grave of the Fireflies and the film was streamed on VOD in the United States and Canada by Anime Network, following their bankruptcy.

== Divisions ==
=== Asia Pulp Cinema ===
Asia Pulp Cinema was CPM's East Asian live-action film distribution division that began in 1999. They were most known for carrying Japanese erotic films, mostly starring actress Kei Mizutani, and films targeted at admirers of the otaku subculture, such as the Akihabara Trilogy.

=== US Manga Corps ===
US Manga Corps was the main anime distribution division for Central Park Media, catering to middle/high school students and older audiences. The US Manga Corps mascot is from MD Geist, from an OVA from the 1980s.

=== Software Sculptors ===
Software Sculptors was founded by John Sirabella, Sam Liebowitz, and Henry Lai in 1993, and specialized in anime-related software, such as screen savers featuring Ranma ½ and Bubblegum Crisis, as well as releasing anime on CD-ROM. They also released several anime titles, most notably Slayers, Revolutionary Girl Utena, and Cat Soup. The company was bought by CPM and was turned into one of their division labels. Sirabella stayed on with CPM until 1997, after which he would go on to form Media Blasters.

=== CPM Press ===
CPM Press (originally CPM Comics, then CPM Manga) was the manga and manhwa publication division. Manga titles were published under the label CPM Manga, and manhwa under CPM Manhwa. CPM also had an adult division under CPM Press known as Bear Bear Press, which largely published Americanized versions of some of their Anime 18 releases such as La Blue Girl. This division started in 1996 and folded the same year releasing only La Blue Girl and Demon Beast Invasion. Bear Bear Press was succeeded by Manga 18.

=== Anime 18 ===
Anime 18 (A18 Corporation) was Central Park Media's distribution division for pornographic anime. Among its releases were Toshio Maeda's Legend of the Overfiend and La Blue Girl. The release of Legend of the Overfiend was the first hentai released in America. Anime 18 released its titles under several labels, with the main label – Anime 18 – used for hentai anime, Manga 18 for manga and manhwa pornography, and Be Beautiful Manga for yaoi manga. When Central Park Media went bankrupt in 2009, the licenses for some of Anime 18's products and movies were transferred to Critical Mass Video and Kitty Media.

Some Anime 18 titles were published under the label Anime HotShots starting February 2005

==== Manga 18 ====
Manga 18 was an English-language publisher of pornographic manga and manhwa which was the manga counterpart of Anime 18 and successor to Bare Bear Press.

==== Be Beautiful Manga ====
The counterpart of Anime 18 that specialized in yaoi manga. On March 19, 2007, Japanese yaoi publisher Libre announced that Be Beautiful Manga was illegally translating and selling their properties to their original owners.

=== Below the Radar ===
Below the Radar was a label that focused on live-action independent and non-mainstream media. Formed in March 2007.

=== Binary Media Works ===
Central Park Media's website unit that operated AnimeOne.com, a website that was dedicated to anime fandom, and UFOCity.com, a website that specialized in alien UFO sightings and hosted a community of UFO enthusiasts. It was shut down in 2004.

=== Mangamania ===
Central Park Media's original direct sales organization, where products were offered for sale by phone or mail.. This division was later acquired and operated by Right Stuf, Inc.

== Productions ==
Releases are only listed if the subtitling, dubbing, or other production work was handled by Central Park Media; rather than being licensed from prior versions. All of the titles are now published by other companies, if at all, due to Central Park Media's liquidation.

Production list
Title	Release		Medium	Dub producer	Notes
Title	Subtitle	Dub	Medium	Dub producer	Notes
A Wind Named Amnesia	1994	1994	Movie	World Wide Group	
Adolescence of Utena	2001	2001	Movie	TAJ Productions	
Adventure Kid		1994	Show (3)	Audioworks Producers Group	
Agent Aika: Naked Missions	1999	1999	Show (4)	Skyhigh Productions	
Agent Aika: Final Battle	2001	2001	Show (3)	Mercury Productions	
Alien Nine	2003	2003	Show (4)	in-house	
Angel Blade	2005	2005	Show (3)	Audio Dolce	
Angel Sanctuary	2001	2001	Show (3)	Mercury Productions	
Animated Classics of Japanese Literature	1994		Show (34)		
Animation Runner Kuromi	2003	2003	Show (1)	Mercury Productions	
Animation Runner Kuromi 2	2006	2006	Show (1)	TripWire Productions	
Arcade Gamer Fubuki	2004	2004	Show (4)	in-house	
Area 88 (OVA)	1993	1996-1999	Show (3)	Sound Dimensions (1) Audioworks Producers Group (2)	Alternate dub 2 episodes dubbed
Ariel Deluxe		—	Show (2)	—	
Ariel Visual		—	Show (2)	—	
Armored Trooper Votoms	1996	2006	Show (52)	Audioworks Producers Group	1 episode dubbed
Art of Fighting	1998	1997	Show (1)	TAJ Productions	
Ayane's High Kick	1998	1998	Show (2)	Skypilot Entertainment	
Battle Arena Toshinden	1996	1997	Show (2)	National Sound	
Battle Skipper	1996	1996	Show (3)	National Sound	
Beast City	1998	1998	Show (3)	unknown	2 episodes released
Behind Closed Doors	2004	2004	Show (3)	Audio Dolce	
Big Wars	1996	1997	Movie	Sound Dimensions	
Birdy the Mighty	1999	1999	Show (4)	Skyhigh Productions	
Black Jack	2004	1997	Show (10)	Animaze	Joint release with Tezuka Productions
Black Widow	2004	2004	Show (2)	unknown	
Blood Royal	2004	2004	Show (2)	unknown	
BloodShadow	2003	2003	Show (3)	El Sonido	
Cat Soup	2003	—	Show (1)	—	
Chains of Lust	2006	2006	Show (2)	TripWire Productions	
City of Sin	2004	2004	Show (1)	unknown	
Crimson Climax	2005	2005	Show (3)	Handheld Post	
Crystal Triangle	1992	—	Movie	—	
Cyber City Oedo 808	1995	1994	Show (3)	World Wide Group	
Cybernetics Guardian	1996	1997	Show (1)	National Sound	
Darkside Blues	1997	1999	Movie	Matlin Recording	
Demon Beast Invasion	1995	1999	Show (6)	Audioworks Producers Group	
Demon Beast Resurrection	1997	2003	Show (4)	Audioworks Producers Group	
Demon City Shinjuku		1994	Movie	World Wide Group	
Demon Warrior Koji	2001	2001	Show (3)	Audioworks Producers Group	
Detonator Orgun		2001	Show (3)	Skyhigh Productions	Alternate dub
DNA^{2} (TV)	2003	2003	Show (15)	Audioworks Producers Group	
Doggy Poo	2004	2004	Movie	Ani100	
Domain of Murder	1998	2004	Show (1)	NYAV Post	
Dominion Tank Police	1991	1992	Show (4)	World Wide Group	
Dog Soldier	1992	1996	Show (1)	Ocean Studios	
Dream Hazard	2000	2000	Show (1)	Audioworks Producers Group	
F-Force	2003	2003	Show (3)	in-house	
Fencer of Minerva	2000	2000	Show (5)	Audioworks Producers Group	
Fire Tripper	1992	1996	Show (1)		
Fobia	1998		Show (2)	Afterdark Audio	
Four Play	2000	2000	Show (2)	Audioworks Producers Group	
Gall Force 2: Destruction	1993	2003	Show (1)	in-house	
Gall Force 3: Stardust War	1993	2003	Show (1)	in-house	
Gall Force: Eternal Story	1992	1996	Movie	TAJ Productions	Alternate dub
Gall Force: Earth Chapter	1994	2003	Show (3)	Matlin Recording	Alternate dub
Gall Force: New Era	1995	2004	Show (2)	Matlin Recording	Alternate dub
Garaga	1996	2001	Movie	Audioworks Producers Group	
Garzey's Wing	2000	2000	Show (3)	Audioworks Producers Group	
Genocyber	1994-1995	1994-1999	Show (5)	World Wide Group (1-3) Audioworks Producers Group (4-5)	
Grave of the Fireflies	1993	1998	Movie	Skypilot Entertainment	Alternate dub
Geobreeders	2000	2000	Show (3)	Mercury Productions	
Geobreeders: Breakthrough	2002	2002	Show (4)	Mercury Productions	
GoShogun: Le Time Étranger	1995	2003	Movie	Mercury Productions	Alternate dub
Hades Project Zeorymer	1994	2003	Show (4)	Audio Dolce	Alternate dub
Hammerboy	2005	2005	Movie	Audioworks Producers Group	Alternate dub
Harlock Saga	2001	2001	Show (6)	TAJ Productions	
Harmageddon	1993	1996	Movie	Audioworks Producers Group	
Here is Greenwood	1996	1996	Show (6)	TAJ Productions	
Hyper Speed GranDoll	1999	1999	Show (3)	Skyhigh Productions	
Ichi the Killer: Episode Zero	2004	2004	Show (1)	TripWire Productions	
Iria: Zeiram the Animation	1996	1996	Show (6)	National Sound	
Judge	1993	1993	Show (1)	World Wide Group	
Kakurenbo: Hide and Seek	2005	2005	Show (1)	TripWire Productions	
Knights of Ramune	1999	1999	Show (6)	Matlin Recording	
La Blue Girl	1995	1996	Show (6)	Audioworks Producers Group	
La Blue Girl Returns	2002	2002	Show (4)	Audioworks Producers Group	
Labyrinth of Flames	2002	2002	Show (2)	Audioworks Producers Group	
Lady Blue	1998	1999	Show (4)	Audioworks Producers Group	
Legend of Himiko	2002	2002	Show (12)	Matlin Recording	
Legend of Lemnear	1996	1998	Show (1)	Knight Mediacom	
Love Lessons	2002	2002	Show (2)	Audioworks Producers Group	
Lunatic Night	1998	2003	Show (2)	Audio Dolce	
Maetel Legend	2002	2002	Show (2)	TAJ Productions	
Magic Woman M	2002	2000	Show (2)	Audioworks Producers Group	
Maison Plesir		2004	Show (2)	unknown	
Mama Mia!			Show (2)	Audioworks Producers Group	
Maris the Wondergirl	1992	1996	Show (1)	World Wide Group	
Mask of Zeguy	1995	2004	Show (2)	Audioworks Producers Group	
Masquerade		2000	Show (4)	Audioworks Producers Group	
Maze (OVA)	2000	2000	Show (2)	Matlin Recording	
Maze (TV)	2000	2000	Show (25)	Matlin Recording	
M.D. Geist I: Most Dangerous Soldier	1998	1996	Show (1)	Audioworks Producers Group	
M.D. Geist II: Death Force	1998	1996	Show (1)	Audioworks Producers Group	
Mermaid Forest	1992	1996	Show (1)		
Metal Fighter Miku	1995	—	Show (13)	—	
Midnight Panther	1999	1999	Show (2)	Mercury Productions	
Midnight Strike Force	2006	2006	Show (2)	Handheld Post	
Momone		1999	Show (1)	Audioworks Producers Group	
Munto	2004	2004	Show (1)	Audioworks Producers Group	
Munto 2: Beyond the Walls of Time	2006	2006	Show (1)	TripWire Productions	
My My Mai	2002	1996	Show (4)	National Sound	
Mystery of the Necronomicon	2001	2001	Show (4)	Matlin Recording	
Negadon: The Monster from Mars	2006	2006	Movie	TripWire Productions	
Night on the Galactic Railroad	1996	2001	Movie	Mercury Productions	
Night Shift Nurses	2002	2002	Show (10)	Audioworks Producers Group	
Nightmare Campus	1998	1998	Show (5)	Matlin Recording	
Nightwalker: The Midnight Detective	2001	2001	Show (12)	Bang Zoom! Entertainment	
Now and Then, Here and There	2002	2002	Show (13)	TAJ Productions	
Nurse Me!		2003	Show (2)	TripWire Productions	
Odin: Starlight Mutiny	1996	1992	Movie	World Wide Group	
Ogenki Clinic		1999	Show	Audioworks Producers Group	
Outlanders	2006	2006	Show (1)	TripWire Productions	Alternate dub
Patlabor	1998	2001	Show (47)	Matlin Recording	
Patlabor: The Mobile Police	1998	2003	Show (7)	Matlin Recording	
Patlabor: The New Files	1997	2005	Show (16)	Matlin Recording	
Photon: The Idiot Adventures	2000	2000	Show (6)	Mercury Productions	
Pianist	2000	2000	Show (1)	Audioworks Producers Group	
Private Psycho Lesson	1997	2004	Show (2)	unknown	
Professor Pain		1998	Show (2)	Audioworks Producers Group	
Project A-ko	1991	1992	Movie	World Wide Group	
Project A-ko 2: Plot of the Daitokuji Financial Group	1994	1994	Show (1)	Ocean Studios	
Project A-ko 3: Cinderella Rhapsody	1994	1994	Show (1)	Ocean Studios	
Project A-ko 4: Final	1994	1994	Show (1)	Ocean Studios	
Project A-ko: Uncivil Wars	1994	1994	Show (2)	Ocean Studios	
Pure Love	2006	2006	Show (2)	Soundz Nu	
Record of Lodoss War	1995	1996	Show (13)	National Sound	
Record of Lodoss War: Chronicles of the Heroic Knight	1999	1999	Show (27)	Headline Sound Studios	
Revolutionary Girl Utena	1998	1998	Show (39)	TAJ Productions	
RG Veda	1997	2001	Show (2)	Mercury Productions	Alternate dub
Rhea Gall Force	1994	2003	Show (1)	Matlin Recording	
Roots Search	1992	—	Show (1)	—	
Roujin Z	1994	1994	Movie	World Wide Group	
Sacrilege	2004	2004	Show (2)	Audio Dolce	
Secret Desires	2004	2004	Show	Afterdark Audio	
Shadow Star Narutaru	2005	2005	Show (13)	Audioworks Producers Group	
Shamanic Princess	2000	2000	Show (6)	Mercury Productions	
Shootfighter Tekken	2004	2004	Show (3)	TripWire Productions	
Sibling Secret		2004	Show (3)	Afterdark Audio	
Silent Service	1998	1998	Show (1)	Sound Dimensions	
Sin Sorority	2004	2004	Show (2)	unknown	
Sins of the Sisters	2000	2000	Show (2)	Audioworks Producers Group	
Slave Market	2004	2004	Show (3)	Audio Dolce	
Sohryuden: Legend of the Dragon Kings	1995	2001	Show (12)	Matlin Recording	Alternate dub
Spaceship Agga Rutter	2001	2000	Show (4)	Audioworks Producers Group	
Space Warriors		1996	Show (3)		
Spirit Warrior	2003	1997	Show (3)	Matlin Recording	
Spirit Warrior: Peacock King	2003	1997	Show (2)	Matlin Recording	
Sprite: Between Two Worlds	2000	2000	Show (4)	Matlin Recording	
Square of the Moon	2005	2005	Show (4)	TripWire Productions	
Stepmother's Sin	2003	2003	Show (2)	Afterdark Audio	
StepSister	2004	2004	Show (2)	TripWire Productions	
Strange Love		1998	Show (2)	Skypilot Entertainment	
Takegami: Guardian of Darkness	1993	1997	Show (3)	TAJ Productions	
Tales of Seduction	2004	2004	Show (3)	Audioworks Producers Group	
Teacher's Pet	2001	2001	Show (4)	Audioworks Producers Group	
Temptation	2005	2005	Show (2)	TripWire Productions	
The Boy Who Wanted to Be a Bear	2005	2005	Movie	TripWire Productions	
The Heroic Legend of Arslan	1994-1998	1998	Show (6)	World Wide Group (1-4) Michael Alben Inc. (5-6)	
The Humanoid	1992	1996	Show (1)	Ocean Studios	
The Laughing Target	1992	1996	Show (1)		
The Ping Pong Club	1998	2001	Show (26)	TAJ Productions	
The Slayers	1996	1996	Show (26)	TAJ Productions	
The Slayers NEXT	1999	1999	Show (26)	TAJ Productions	
The Slayers TRY	2000	2000	Show (26)	TAJ Productions	
The Ultimate Teacher	1993	1996	Show (1)	Ocean Studios	Alternate dub
The World of Narue	2004	2004	Show (12)	in-house	
They Were 11	1996	1996	Movie	Animaze	
Time Bokan: Royal Revival	2005	2005	Show (2)	Matlin Recording	
Tokyo Babylon	1994	1994	Show (2)	World Wide Group	
TriAngle	2001	2001	Show (2)	Skyhigh Productions	
Twin Angels	1999	1997	Show (8)	Audioworks Producers Group	
Urotsukidōji: Legend of the Overfiend	1993	1993	Show (1)	Michael Alben Inc.	
Urotsukidōji II: Legend of the Demon Womb	1993	1993	Show (1)	Michael Alben Inc.	
Urotsukidōji III: Return of the Overfiend	1996	—	Show (1)	World Wide Group	
Urotsukidōji IV: Inferno Road	2001	1996	Show (3)	Audioworks Producers Group	
Urusei Yatsura 2: Beautiful Dreamer	1996	1996	Movie	Matlin Recording	
Venus 5	2003	1997	Show (2)	Audioworks Producers Group	
Venus Wars	1993	1992	Movie	World Wide Group	
Virgin Fleet	2001	2000	Show (3)	Headline Sound Studios	
Vixens	1997	2000	Show (5)	Audioworks Producers Group	
Wanna-Be's	1992	—	Show (1)	—	
Wild Cardz	1999	1999	Show (2)	Soundz Nu	
Wrath of the Ninja: The Yotoden Movie	1999	1998	Movie	Skypilot Entertainment	
Xpress Train	2004	2004	Show (2)	Audioworks Producers Group	
Xtra Credit	2004	2004	Show (2)	unknown	
Yu Yu Hakusho the Movie: Poltergeist Report	1998	1998	Movie	Skypilot Entertainment	
Zenki	1995	—	Show (13)	—	
Zero Woman: Assassin Lovers	2000	2002	Movie	Bang Zoom! Entertainment	
