= Tomiyama =

Tomiyama may refer to:

== Places ==
- Tomiyama, Aichi
- Tomiyama, Chiba

== People ==
- Haruo Tomiyama (1935–2016), Japanese photographer
- Hideaki Tomiyama (born 1957), Japanese wrestler
- Kantaro Tomiyama (born 1954), Japanese CEO
- Kei Tomiyama (1938–1995), Japanese actor, voice actor and narrator
- Shōgo Tomiyama (born 1952), Japanese writer and producer
- Tomiyama Taeko (1921–2021), Japanese visual artist and writer
- Takamitsu Tomiyama (born 1990), Japanese footballer
- Tatsuyuki Tomiyama (born 1982), Japanese footballer
