= Hiroto =

- Gender: Male

Origin
- Origin: Japanese
- Meaning: Different meanings depending on the kanji used

Hiroto (written: 浩人, 博人, 博土, 弘人, 洋人, 紘人, 裕人, 寛人, 大翔, 陽翔, 大仁 or ヒロト in katakana) is a masculine Japanese given name. Notable people with the name include:

- Hiroto (ヒロト), member of the visual kei rock band Alice Nine
- Hiroto Hirashima (1910–2007), Japanese-American bowler and activist
- Hiroto Inoue (井上 大仁; born 1993), Japanese long-distance runner
- Hiroto Kōmoto (甲本 浩人; born 1963), Japanese rock singer
- Hiroto Kyoguchi (京口 紘人; born 1993), Japanese boxer
- Hiroto Mogi (茂木 弘人; born 1984), Japanese footballer
- Hiroto Morooka (諸岡 裕人; born 1997), Japanese footballer
- Hiroto Muraoka (村岡 博人; born 1931), Japanese footballer
- Hiroto Nakagawa (中川 寛斗, born 1994), Japanese footballer
- Hiroto Tanaka (田中 裕人; born 1990), Japanese footballer
- Hiroto Torihata (鳥畑 洋人; born 1969), Japanese actor and voice actor
- Hiroto Yamada (山田 寛人; born 2000), Japanese footballer
- Hiroto Yamamura (山村 博土; born 1974), Japanese footballer

== Fictional characters ==
- Hiroto Kiyama (基山 ヒロト), a character from Inazuma Eleven
- Hiroto Honda (本田 ヒロト), a character from Yu-Gi-Oh!
- Hiroto Maehara (前原 陽斗), character from the Assassination Classroom manga and anime series
- Hiroto Sutou (須塔 大翔), a character from the tokusatsu Engine Sentai Go-Onger
- Hiroto Kuga (クガ・ヒロト), a fictional character from the Gundam Series Gundam Build Divers Re:Rise

== See also ==
- Hiroto Station, a railway station in Fukaura, Aomori Prefecture Japan
