= Burst Angel =

Japanese anime television series

- Third DVD cover, featuring (from left to right) Meg, Jo, Amy and Sei

爆裂天使 (Bakuretsu Tenshi)
- Genre: Adventure; Girls with guns; Mecha
- Anime television series
- Directed by: Koichi Ohata
- Produced by: Naomi Nishiguchi; Naoshi Imamoto; Toshio Hatanaka
- Written by: Fumihiko Shimo
- Music by: Masara Nishida
- Studio: Gonzo
- Licensed by: Crunchyroll (Note: In North America through Crunchyroll, LLC (formerly known as Funimation).); AUS: Madman Entertainment; UK: MVM Films
- Original network: TV Asahi
- English network: SA: Animax; SEA: Animax Asia; US: Funimation Channel, Crunchyroll Channel; ZA: Animax
- Original run: April 7, 2004 – September 22, 2004
- Episodes: 24
- Manga

Burst Angel: Angel's Adolescence
- Written by: Minoru Murao
- Published by: MediaWorks
- English publisher: NA: Tokyopop (former); Titan Comics
- Magazine: Dengeki Comic Gao!
- Original run: January 27, 2004 – June 27, 2005
- Volumes: 3
- Original video animation

Burst Angel: Infinity
- Directed by: Koichi Ohata
- Written by: Fumihiko Shimo
- Music by: Masara Nishida
- Studio: Gonzo
- Licensed by: AUS: Madman Entertainment; NA: Funimation; UK: MVM Films
- Released: March 23, 2007
- Runtime: 25 minutes
- icon

Burst Angel (Japanese: 爆裂天使, Hepburn: Bakuretsu Tenshi) is a Japanese anime television series directed by Koichi Ohata, from a screenplay by Fumihiko Shimo. It was produced by the Gonzo animation studio. Burst Angel takes place in the near future, after a rise in criminal activity forced the Japanese government to allow citizens to possess firearms and establish the Recently Armed Police of Tokyo (RAPT). The series follows a band of four mercenaries, named Jo, Meg, Sei, and Amy. It was broadcast for 24-episodes on TV Asahi from April to September 2004. An original video animation (OVA), titled Burst Angel: Infinity, was released in 2007.

== Plot ==
In the near future, due to an unusual rise in criminal activity, it has become legal to possess firearms in Japan so lawful citizens can protect themselves. At the same time, the government established the Recently Armed Police of Tokyo, whose methods are exterminating criminals rather than arresting them.

The story opens with Kyohei Tachibana, a male college student at a culinary arts school with dreams of someday becoming a pastry chef, motorcycling down an inner city street and becoming caught up in a shoot-out between a mysterious silver-haired woman and a psycho gangster. Kyohei escapes unharmed and ends up working as a cook for Jo, Meg, Amy, and Sei in an effort to gather up enough money to travel to France. The girls, ranging in ages of eleven to nineteen, turn out to be pseudo-mercenary agents for a larger international group known as Bailan.

Burst Angel focuses on the group as they investigate a series of mutated human monsters with glowing brains that cause various amounts of mayhem in Tokyo.

== Characters ==
=== Main ===
Three of the four girls (Jo, Meg, and Amy) are named after the March sisters in the novel Little Women.

Jo (ジョウ, Jō)
Voiced by: Akeno Watanabe (Japanese); Monica Rial (English)
Jo serves as the group's primary combatant and pilot of Django, using it to execute missions for Sei and assist allies—particularly Meg, whom she prioritizes above all else. Throughout the series, romantic undertones suggest her feelings for Meg. Outside combat, she enjoys horror and gore films. Her backstory reveals she was a genetically engineered weapon, later rediscovering her origins. After being captured and reprogrammed at Hinode, she escapes during a confrontation with her counterpart Maria, who seeks to prove their superiority. Their climactic battle exhausts both fighters, ultimately restoring Maria's humanity. Determined to end RAPT, Jo defies Meg's protests, renders her unconscious for safety, and departs after leaving her jacket as a memento.
ADR Director Christopher Bevins comments that Jo is "like a female cross between Clint Eastwood and Wolverine".
Meg (メグ, Megu)
Voiced by: Megumi Toyoguchi (Japanese); Jamie Marchi (English)
Meg is characterized by her red hair (initially depicted as black in the monochrome episode "Wild Kids") and distinctive cowgirl attire, typically armed with a revolver and occasionally an anti-tank rifle. Frequently captured during missions, she relies on Jo for rescue, demonstrating unwavering loyalty to her. Their partnership began when Jo encountered Meg as an orphan in New York City, leading them to become bounty hunters. While the anime portrays their bond with subtle affection, the manga explicitly depicts Meg's romantic attraction to Jo, including sexual fantasies and overt advances. After learning of Jo's engineered origins, Meg opposes her continued combat role—prompting Jo to incapacitate her and leave her jacket as a farewell. In the finale, Meg discovers Jo's scarf at RAPT's ruins and bids her goodbye, later appearing in Jo's outfit with an Orange Django, mirroring the series' opening sequence.
In the Newtype magazine article, Meg is the "'spunky act now, ask questions later' gal" and that voice actor Jamie Marchi "brilliantly captured Meg's What-ever attitude".
Sei (セイ)
Voiced by: Rie Tanaka (Japanese); Clarine Harp (English)
Sei serves as Bailan's composed leader, recruiting Jo and Meg while donning a distinctive blue jacket and black bun hairstyle. Born into a powerful Chinese syndicate, she received traditional training before inheriting leadership from her grandfather. When clan members allied with RAPT—compromising their values and coercing her cooperation—Sei ultimately rebelled with her grandfather's counsel. Her fate remains unresolved after the RAPT headquarters' destruction, where she and Jo were caught in the explosion.
In the Newtype magazine article, Bevins comments that Sei's character is cold, business-like, and notes that Clarine Harp's personality of sarcastic exterior, but most caring and fiercely loyal interior, "that's Sei to a T".
Amy (エイミー, Eimī)
Voiced by: Mikako Takahashi (Japanese); Alison Retzloff (English)
Amy is a technologically gifted youth recruited by Sei after her hacking activities attracted government scrutiny. Her expertise enabled Bailan to locate and enlist Jo and Meg. Typically seen with light brown pigtails and carrying a pink stuffed animal concealing a laptop, she frequently engages in good-natured arguments with Meg while enjoying Kyohei's snacks.
In the Newtype magazine article, Bevins comments that "while Amy is just as brainy as Conan" (the title character in Case Closed, and also voiced by Retzloff), "she has a prissy, snotty demeanor that would give the young detective a migraine".

=== Supporting characters ===
Kyohei Tachibana (立場無 恭平, Tachibana Kyōhei)
Voiced by: Yūji Ueda (Japanese); Greg Ayres (English)
A student attending a certified culinary school who is proficient in French, Chinese, Italian and Japanese cooking. Kyohei is often seen wearing his chef uniform and riding a small motor scooter which is destroyed by Jo on two occasions. He is hired by Sei as a cook for the girls because their last cook had left. He continues working for the team to earn money to go to France and try becoming a pastry chef.
Leo Jinno (仁野 レオ, Jin'no Reo)
Voiced by: Takayuki Sugō (Japanese); Mike McFarland (English)
He is Django's mechanic. Leo hates that Jo plays rough with Django and that Meg annoys him when he's working. He has trouble controlling his urges to act like a child as seen when the team goes to Fortune Island Artificial Beach resort. There, he smashes a go-kart out of the raceway and down the street. Despite being the team's mechanic, he has seen combat on several occasion wielding a pair of sub-machine guns.
Takane Katsu (勝 鷹音, Katsu Takane)
Voiced by: Risa Hayamizu (Japanese); Caitlin Glass (English)
A loud-mouthed, bike-riding police officer from Osaka. Takane is often seen riding a chopper and wears a uniform resembling that of a schoolgirl. She carries a large wooden sword, which she swings around often as it symbolizes her leadership of an all girl biker gang who often act as her deputies. She's also efficient at throwing handcuffs and subduing her target. Takane is quick to lose her temper and hates being in debt to anyone. She is also the daughter of the Police Chief of Osaka. After crossing paths with the team however, she becomes attached to the team and assists them any way she can as a debt to Jo even if it means disobeying her father.

=== Antagonists ===
Ishihara (石原)
Voiced by: Katsuhisa Hōki (Japanese); Kent Williams (English)
Governor Ishihara is the founder of RAPT and Tokyo's leader, publicly advocating for peace while secretly employing extreme measures against criminals and shifting blame to others. He conspires with Azuma Iriki to seize control of Osaka, motivated by envy over its comparatively harmonious society. After Glenford attempts to assassinate him via bombing, Ishihara survives in a mutated, zombie-like state. Consumed by vengeance, he attacks Tokyo's subway system before confronting Bailan in a biomechanical form. Jo ultimately destroys him using Django.
Ricky Glenford (リッキーグレンフォード, Rikkī Gurenfōdo)
Voiced by: Yukitoshi Hori (Japanese); Jerry Russell (English)
The leader of RAPT. He organized the creation of the "Genocide Angels" program which leads to the creation of Jo, Maria, and others like them. After organizing the assassination of Ishihara, he takes control of Tokyo and puts it under martial law. His true identity turns out to be a glowing brain placed in a cyborg body.
Maria (マリア)
Voiced by: Kyōko Hikami (Japanese); Colleen Clinkenbeard (English)
Maria is a genetically engineered combatant like Jo, but exhibits greater aggression and specializes in bladed weapons rather than firearms. The two were finalists in the Syndicate's "Genocide Angel" program, though Maria's victory felt incomplete since Jo merely lost consciousness. When Jo is captured, Maria abducts Meg to force a decisive rematch on an aircraft carrier reminiscent of their original battleground. After Jo defeats her in close combat, Maria regains her humanity but questions her purpose. As RAPT forces attack, she sacrifices herself to cover Jo and Meg's escape, apparently perishing in the process.

=== Other characters ===
Jei Kokuren (ジェイ国連)
Voiced by: Kazuya Ichijō (Japanese); Michael Sinterniklaas (English)
A representative from Kokuren and Bailan's Japanese counterpart. His father and Sei's grandfather arrange for him and Sei to wed so that the white and black lotus can join together once again. However, Sei's grandfather respectfully declines Jei's request to have both the Bai Lan and Kokuren seals displayed together. Angry, he and his men attack Sei to try to obtain the Bai Lan seal by force. Jei obtains the seal and almost escapes, but he is stopped by Jo after shooting down the dragon head of the yacht making it crash onto Jei's boat.
Chief Katsu (勝署長, Katsu shochō)
Voiced by: Kazuhiko Kishino (Japanese); Brice Armstrong (English)
The Chief is a well-respected man in Osaka with a great sense of honor and justice. Despite looking like he doesn't care for his daughter, Takane, he actually shows great concern for her. He shows great disgust towards the government of Tokyo and further towards Glenford and RAPT.
Sam (サム, Samu)
A police officer that Meg robbed when she was younger. Based on flashbacks, it is implied that Sam once had a family (a wife and daughter), that are now dead as he carries around his daughter's doll with him. He saves Charlie and Shirley from falling debris at the area Jo was fighting Lava, one of the "Genocide Angel" candidates. Afterward, he adopts all three children while Meg and Jo leave their own way.
The Orphans
There are four orphans, the eldest of whom is Meg. The next oldest is Dorothy, an African-American girl who usually aids Meg in her thefts. Then Charlie, a young Caucasian boy who is usually left to care for Shirley when Meg and Dorothy leave. He is the most cynical of the group. And finally, Shirley, a mute little girl and the youngest of the group. She is the one who finds an unconscious Jo and decides to take her home with them. She carries a book with a picture of an angel with silver hair; something she always points out to everyone and especially towards Jo who she shows great affection for.
Akio (アキオ)
Voiced by: Toshihide Tsuchiya (Japanese); Johnny Yong Bosch (English)
An old friend and classmate of Kyohei who always defended him. He is found on the streets by Eiji, a Yakuza member. He takes Akio in and has a doctor convert him into a Cyberoid. He goes on a one man war against the Yakuza. Eiji agrees to a deal with the right-hand man of the Yakuza boss to kill Akio. Eiji fails and ends up being shot several times by an enraged Akio due his betrayal. He tells Kyohei what happened to him and how he became a Cyberoid. After killing off the Yakuza and the Boss, Akio battles Eiji now being converted to a Cyberoid. Akio kills Eiji though he dies in the process leaving Kyohei crying at the loss of his friend.
Lover (ラヴァー, Ravā)
Voiced by: Mayumi Asano (Japanese); Gwendolyn Lau (English)
She is a bio-weapon along with Maria and Jo. Lover is one of the final three survivors in the "Genocide Angel" training exercise (which occurred before Jo is found by Shirley). During the exercise, she almost kills Jo and Maria with missiles from a fighter plane she hot-wired, but is countered by Jo, and ultimately defeated by Maria. However, all three survive the ordeal. She is then sent by the Syndicate to retrieve Jo, but fails.

== Media ==
=== Anime ===
Burst Angel, animated by Gonzo, directed by Koichi Ohata and written by Fumihiko Shimo, was broadcast for twenty-four episodes on TV Asahi from April 7 to September 22, 2004. The opening theme for the series is "Loosey" by the Stripes while the ending theme is "Under the Sky" by Coudica in Japanese and Caitlin Glass in English.

The complete collection of DVDs from Funimation have been released as of January 2, 2009. This DVD set includes episodes 1–24 and the OVA. The complete collection was later released on Blu-ray on September 29, 2009. The series was made available on PlayStation Network's Video store in 2008. Following Funimation's merging with Crunchyroll, the series was added to the platform in September 2022.

=== Manga ===
A manga prequel to the TV series, titled Angel's Adolescence, was written and illustrated by Minoru Murao. It was serialized in MediaWorks' shōnen manga magazine Dengeki Comic Gao! from January 27, 2004, to June 27, 2005. (Note: It finished in the magazine's August 2005 issue, released on June 27 of that same year.) MediaWorks collected its chapters in three tankōbon volumes, released from July 27, 2004, to July 27, 2005. The manga depicts the romantic relationship of Jo and Meg.

In 2008, Tokyopop licensed the manga for English release in North America, The three volumes were released from September 9, 2008, to May 12, 2009. In August 2023, Titan Comics announced that they had licensed the manga, and the first volume was released on July 2, 2024. The series was added to the Crunchyroll Manga catalog in November 2025.

=== Original video animation ===
An original video animation (OVA), titled Burst Angel: Infinity was released in Japan on March 23, 2007. The OVA deals is a side story revolving around Jo and Meg visiting Sam and her old gang in New York explaining the aftermath of episode 14 of the TV series. The OVA also includes a short preview titled Burst Angel Heavenly Moon Burst Crimson (爆裂天使 赤ク爆ス天ノ月) by Ugetsu Hakua showing the characters five years in the future, including Jo, Sei and Maria alive. The OVA was released by Funimation on November 13, 2007.
