= Guardian of Darkness =

Original video animation

- Cover of the second North American DVD release of Guardian of Darkness

暗黒神伝承 武神 (Ankokushin Denshou Takegami)
- Genre: Horror, Science fiction
- Original video animation
- Directed by: Osamu Yamazaki
- Written by: Osamu Yamazaki
- Studio: J.C.Staff
- Licensed by: NA: Central Park Media; UK: ADV Films UK
- Released: March 23, 1990 – January 24, 1992
- Runtime: 45 minutes each
- Episodes: 3

Guardian of Darkness (Japanese: 暗黒神伝承 武神, Hepburn: Ankokushin Denshō Takegami; also known as Takegami: Guardian of Darkness) is a three-episode OVA anime series released by J.C.Staff between March 1990 through January 1992. The episodes are licensed for release in North America by Central Park Media and in the United Kingdom by ADV Films UK division.

== Plot ==
Terumi (Voiced by: Noriko Hidaka (Japanese); Lisa Ortiz (English)) is a lonely high school girl, teased for being mousy and homely by her classmates. Her childhood friend Kouichi (Voiced by: Kazuhiko Inoue (Japanese); Ted Lewis (English)) is oblivious to her being in love with him. An ancient dragon lord offers to make her beautiful and popular in exchange for allowing him to possess her. Desperate, she agrees, and later rips apart the souls of the girls who once bullied her. Meanwhile, Kouichi is approached by another god, Susano (Voiced by: Norio Wakamoto (Japanese); Ted Gregory (English)), who wants to possess his body, so he can defeat the dragon. Reluctantly, Kouichi agrees and later meets a priestess named Sayoko (Voiced by: Yoshiko Sakakibara (Japanese); Melanie Jones (English)) who explains more to him about the current war between the gods. However, itokill the dragon, his host must die too leaving Kouichi struggling to figure out how to defeat the dragon spirits while also trying to save Terumi's life.

== Media ==
Developed by J.C.Staff, the three episodes of Guardian of Darkness were directed and written by Osamu Yamazaki, and produced by Nobuhisa Abe and Shigeaki Komatsu. The three episodes were initially released to VHS format in Japan across three individual volumes. The first was released in March 1990; the last was released in January 1992.

The series is licensed for distribution in North America by Central Park Media—then US Manga Corps. They released the English dubbed across three VHS volumes under the name Takegami: Guardian of Darkness, with the first two released in October 1997, and the final episode released in February 1998. A box set containing all three volumes was also released in the same month. The episodes were released in a single DVD volume on January 19, 1999, with the original Japanese audio and English subtitled options added. The series was re-released to DVD on July 29, 2003, with the name Guardian of Darkness and new extras added.

The episodes are also licensed for release in the United Kingdom by ADV Films, and the English dubbed episodes were released for digital download at IGN's "Direct2Drive" service.

=== Episode Listing ===
No.	Title	Original release date	North American release
1	"Sixteen Night Stories"; Transliteration: "Izayoi Jouwa" (Japanese: 十六夜情話)	March 23, 1990	October 7, 1997
2	"Eight-Hundred Kilometers"; Transliteration: "Yao Bikuni" (Japanese: 八百比丘尼)	July 26, 1991	October 7, 1997
3	"Strange Water Leech"; Transliteration: "Hiruko Kitan" (Japanese: 水蛭子奇譚)	January 24, 1992	February 3, 1998

== Reception ==
EX magazine's Charles McCarter felt the series had good character designs and particularly praised the dragon designs used in the series. He also praised the series musical soundtrack and the animation quality. However, he also felt the series claim that Terumi was inconsistent with her visually attractive character design, noting that "she is the most attractive character of the bunch (even before the hairstyle change)", and that the portrayal of the Shinto god Susanoo as the good guy as strange when the figure is normally a bad guy who "is typically shown in the myths...to be a bullying tantrum-thrower and all-around not-very-nice guy". He also criticized the English voice actors in the Central Park Media dub for the mispronunciation of the Japanese names. As a whole, however, McCarter felt it was a fun series, particularly for fans of the occult and horror genres. Carlos Ross of THEM Anime Reviews agreed with McCarter about Terumi's character design being the cutest of the series rather than ugly, and the oddity of Susanoo being the good god in the series. However, Ross felt the series was unmemorable, plagued with writing inconsistencies, and bad animation. He also disliked the English dub, finding Lisa Ortiz's performance as Terumi to be "grating", the other voices forgettable and annoying for their mispronunciation of names. In his final summary, Ross felt that "poor animation and lackluster writing sabotage an interesting premise and potentially cool characters."

Anime Encyclopedia authors Jonathan Clements and Helen McCarthy offered the series mild praise for its English dub, particularly the demonic voice effects, but otherwise trashed the series as a "derivative tale of violent transformations...with a dose of misogyny and lackluster fight scenes."
