= National Video Center =

Video production company & studios

The National Video Center was a video production company with studios in Washington, DC, Boston, Atlanta, Connecticut and New York City until June 2002. National Recording Studios opened in 1959 in Manhattan at 730 Fifth Avenue between 56th and 57th Streets - Recording Studios were on the 6th floor which included Studio B, and insert shoot stage for the fledgling National Video, located on the 11th floor. Original owners were Irv Kaufman, Hal Lustig, and brother Carl Lustig. Andrew Lustig eventually became the CEO and owner of National Video Center and Recording Studios.

National moved its headquarters to the former West Side Airlines Terminal at 460 West 42nd Street (which was on Theatre Row (New York City)) as well as maintaining a huge music recording studio in what used to be the ballroom of the Edison Hotel. Studio shots from the film Tootsie were filmed in the West 42nd Street studio TV-1, and the closing shots of the movie are the exterior of National's building. In the 1990s, National Video Center launched divisions based in Boston and Westport, Connecticut. National Westport was short-lived, but National Boston Video Center spun off two more divisions; National Ministry of Design and Rumblestrip Audio.

The company's divisions in Boston (National Boston, NMD, and Rumblestrip Audio), as well as Napoleon Videographics (now known as The Napoleon Group), are still operating to this day. National Video Center worked with clients such as MTV, PBS, CBS, NBC, ABC, Discovery, A&E, USA Network, and many more. In 1992 NY1 launched its initial studio on the fourth floor. In the mid 2000s, 460 West 42nd Street was demolished for a 59-story apartment tower.

== Selected work ==
=== National Boston ===
- Jimi Hendrix: Live at Woodstock (audio transfers) (1999)
- Thug (telecine) (2005)
- Tricks of Love (post-production) (2008)
- Sleather (color correction) (2010)
- Someday Melissa (color correction) (2011)
- Manakamana (digital lab) (2013)

=== NMD ===
- NOVA (series graphics)
- ABC World News with Diane Sawyer (show packaging) (2009)
- Katie (show packaging) (2012)
- Ask This Old House (show packaging) (2013)
- American Sports Network (network branding) (2014)

=== National Westport ===
- A Weekend with Wendell (video post-production) (1998)

=== Telezign ===
- WCIX (1989)
- WNEV-TV (1989)
- WPIX (1990)
- WBAL-TV (1991)
- Bravo (1992, 2001)
- PBS (1992)
- PRISM (1993)
- HBO (1997)
- History Television (1997)
- KTVU (1997)
- HBO Latin America (1999)
- Trio (1999)
- Encore (1999)
- TNT Latin America (2000)
- SoapNet (2000)
- Survivor (2000)
- BBC America (2001)

=== West End Editorial ===
- Love Power (music video) (1996)
- Talked to Death (production services) (1997)

=== National Sound (New York) ===
- You Must Remember This: A Tribute to Casablanca (narration recording) (1992)
- Dangerous Game (music recording) (1993)
- The Rosie O'Donnell Show (music) (1996)
- Spin City (sound post-production) (1996-1998)
- Talked to Death (production services) (1997)
- The Amati Girls (ADR recording) (2000)
- Battle Arena Toshinden
- Battle Skipper
- My My Mai
- Iria: Zeiram the Animation
- Record of Lodoss War
- Urotsukidoji
