= Magic Woman M =

Japanese OVA series

- Magic Woman M DVD Cover

魔法少女メルル (Mahō Shōjo Meruru)
- Genre: Adventure, Hentai, Fantasy
- Manga
- Written by: Nekoshita Pong
- English publisher: NA: Manga 18
- Magazine: Monthly Fantazine
- Original run: 1993 – 1995
- Volumes: 1
- Original video animation
- Directed by: Minekazu Hirade
- Produced by: Kaito Gitsunobu
- Written by: Hakase Ichii
- Studio: PASOKAN; Akatonbo
- Licensed by: NA: Anime 18 (former) Critical Mass (current)
- Released: January 21, 1997 – April 21, 1998
- Episodes: 2
- Video game

Mahō Shōjo Meruru ~Kamigami no Shihō o Motomete~
- Developer: Akatonbo
- Publisher: Akatonbo
- Genre: Fantasy, eroge
- Platform: Windows
- Released: April 2, 1999
- icon

Magic Woman M, known in Japan as Magical Girl Meruru (Japanese: 魔法少女メルル, Hepburn: Mahō Shōjo Meruru), is a two episode hentai anime OVA series. It is based on a manga by Nekoshita Pong that was serialized in Monthly Fantazine. It was originally licensed by Central Park Media, which released the OVA on DVD under their Anime 18 label. It is currently licensed by Critical Mass.

== Story ==
A newly trained young sorceress named Meruru gets lost in the forest in the middle of training, and has numerous lurid encounters with unsavory characters and lustful beasts. When aroused, Meruru attains the state of ultimate ecstasy and unleashes an explosive power from within.

== Characters ==
Meruru "Meru" Sheckle (メルル・シェクル): series, she is not yet much of a sorceress; her powers inevitably allow her to escape the various predicaments in which she finds herself—just not with her dignity intact. She is voiced in the English dub by Holly Bobbit.

Sharuru (シャルル): Meruru's mentor teacher. When Meruru is about to be—or is being—violated, he appears onscreen and says things like, "Oh, Meruru has to learn about patience!" He is voiced in the English dub by Lee Bowery.

Luna (ルナ): A young warrior who is not-so good at becoming a great warrior. She is rescued by Meruru from a hostile tree and becomes her companion. Luna is trying to save her older sister from the Ogre and also tries to search for Meruru. She is the voiced in the English dub by Lynna Dunham.

Frenieple "Freni" Slaipny Sen (フレニ): A sorceress who is a leader of her team and was rescued by Meruru from fish-like monsters and becomes her companion. She is voiced in the English dub by Lynna Dunham.

Ogre (オーガ): The main villain of episode one. The Ogre is terrorizing a village by killing people, raping young women with its humongous flagpole-sized organ, and eating them when its done. It is voiced in the English dub by Kay Pooh.

Tia (ティア): A warrior who tries to save the village from the ogre but ends up being raped by it. She is voiced in the English dub by Wendy Talker.

Liao (リーアォ): A ninja who is with Freni's Team. She is voiced in the English dub by Wendy Talker.

The TepiTepies: （"Sahagin"・サハギン）Creatures who appear in the second episode. They kidnapped Meruru and Freni when they try to cross the river, and subsequently rape both of the girls. They are voiced in the English dub by Barry Banner.
