= Koichi Ohata =

Japanese animation director and mechanical designer

- Born: July 26, 1962 (age 64); Aichi Prefecture, Japan
- Occupations: Mecha designer, storyboard artist, director

Koichi Ohata (大畑 晃一, Ōhata Kōichi; born July 26, 1962) is a Japanese anime mecha designer, storyboard artist, and director. He worked on anime such as Cybernetics Guardian, M.D. Geist, Genocyber, and Gunbuster.

== Career ==
He also designed the robot in Gunbuster.

He directed Burst Angel and the second through fourth seasons of Ikki Tousen anime series.

His mecha design is known for mixing mechanical and biological elements together.

He also did art for the American produced MD Geist comic series produced by Central Park Media.

== Filmography ==
Year	Title	Crew role	Notes	Source
1983–84	Lightspeed Electroid Albegas	Mechanical design		
1984	Chō Kōsoku Galvion	Mechanical design		
1984–85	Video Warrior Laserion	Mechanical design		
1984–85	Choriki Robo Galatt	Guest mechanical design		
1985–86	Ninja Senshi Tobikage	Mechanical design		
1988	Mobile Suit Gundam: Char's Counterattack	Design cooperation	Film	
1988	Sonic Soldier Borgman	Mechanical design		
1988	Gunbuster	Robot design	OVA	
1989–94	Angel Cop	Mechanical Design	OVA	
1989	Cybernetics Guardian	Mechanical Design	OVA	
1994	Super Dimensional Fortress Macross II: Lovers Again	Mechanical design, mechanical supervision	OVA	
1994	Genocyber	Director, Storyboard, Script	OVA	
1996	M.D. Geist II: Death Force	Director, Draft, Settings	OVA	
2000	Biohazard 4D-Executer	Director	Short film	
2001	Sadamitsu the Destroyer	Series director		
2004	Burst Angel	Series director		
2005	Gun Sword	Storyboard (Episode 8)		
2007	Ikki Tousen: Dragon Destiny	Series director		
2007	Burst Angel Infinity	Director	OVA	
2007	Saiyuki Reload: Burial	Director, Storyboards	OVA	
2007–08	You're Under Arrest: Full Throttle	Series director		
2008	Ikki Tousen: Great Guardians	Series director	Also OVA	
2010	Ikki Tousen: Xtreme Xecutor	Series director, Script	Also OVA	
2011	Maken-ki!	Series director	TV	
2014	Detective Conan: Dimensional Sniper	Storyboard Cooperation	Film	
2015	Detective Conan: Sunflowers of Inferno	Storyboard Cooperation	Film	
2020–21	Healin' Good Pretty Cure	Storyboard	TV	
2021	Redo of Healer	Storyboard	TV	
2025	9-Nine: Ruler's Crown	Series director	TV	
2027	The One. Later On...	Series chief director, Script, Character designer	TV	
