= Line break =

Line break may refer to:

- Line break (poetry), a literary device
- Line break, line breaking character, manual line break, or newline
- Automatic line break, or line wrap and word wrap
