= Crimson Climax =

- Hotaruko
- Directed by: Katsuma Kanazawa
- Written by: Katsuma Kanazawa
- Release date: 2003
- Running time: 90 minutes
- Country: Japan
- Language: Japanese

Crimson Climax (Japanese: 螢子 - "Hotaruko" / Firefly") is a hentai genre animation movie released in 2003. It contains thriller, horror and erotica elements.

== Premiere ==
It was first released as a three-part series of films, and later merged and released as an OVA.

== Plot ==
After her mother's sudden death, Ryo returns to her island-based family home. There, she begins to look into her mother's strange past behavior. Upon meeting her cousin Hotaruko, Ryo is lured into a cult.
