= Cybernetics Guardian =

Japanese original video animation

聖獣機サイガード (Seijūki Saigādo)
- Genre: Action
- Original video animation
- Directed by: Koichi Ohata
- Written by: Riku Sanjo
- Music by: Norimasa Yamanaka; Trash Gang (vocal themes only)
- Studio: AIC
- Released: November 1, 1989
- Runtime: 45 minutes
- icon

Cybernetics Guardian (聖獣機サイガード, Seijūki Saigādo; lit. Holy Beast Machine Cy-Guard) is an anime original video animation. The original Japanese version was released in 1989 by Anime International Company, and an English Language version in 1996, licensed by Central Park Media. It is about John Stalker who is a research pilot for the fictional Central Guard Company. John was born in the city of Cyber-wood, in an area known as the Cancer Slums. The antagonist of the story, Adler, plans to attack the citizens of the Cancer Slums.

In this Japanese animated science fiction adventure, cities of the future are plagued by violence, and the Central Guard Company is commissioned to find a solution to urban crime. One designer creates a Guard Suit with special psychic powers, while another develops a robotic killing machine that will not only eliminate the bad guys, but also get rid of his romantic rivals in the process. But when John Stalker is given the assignment of testing the Guard Suit, it uncovers a dark and dangerous secret he has kept hidden from the world. Three episodes were planned, but only one was completed leaving the plot unfinished.

== Reception ==
The Encyclopedia of Science Fiction described Cybernetics Guardian as a modestly enjoyable anime, despite its cluttered plot and limited characterization. It attributed these weaknesses partly its short running time, which also leaves much of the worldbuilding vague, presumably because elements were intended to be developed in future episodes that were never produced. The encyclopedia considered the fight scenes unremarkable, but praised the work's brevity, fast pace and occasional high-quality animation, and identified RoboCop (1987) as a likely influence.
