= Hiroto Torihata =

Japanese actor and voice actor (born 1969)

- Born: June 22, 1969 (age 57)
- Occupation: Voice actor

Hiroto Torihata (鳥畑 洋人, Torihata Hiroto; born July 22, 1969 in Tokyo, Japan) is a Japanese actor and voice actor. He voiced Roger in Capcom's 2000 short-film Biohazard 4D-Executer.

== Other work ==
=== Anime television ===
- Kinda'ichi Case Files
- PoPoLoCrois
- Kino's Journey

=== OVA ===
- Karas

=== Dubs ===
- 300: Rise of an Empire
- Armageddon
- Crouching Tiger, Hidden Dragon
- CSI: NY
- Das fliegende Klassenzimmer
- Dead Heat
- Entrapment
- Friends
- How to Lose a Guy in 10 Days
- Platoon
- Smokin' Aces
- Spin City
- Syriana
- The West Wing

=== Drama ===
- Taiheiyō Satsui no Uzushio Ottogoroshi!
- Tantei Jimusho V Kanashiki Tōbōsha Uwaki Chōshain ga Kon'yakusha o Koroshita!?

=== Stage ===
- Yabō to Natsugusa
- Haha, Kimottama to Sono Kodomotachi: Sanjūnen Sensō Nendaiki
- Bābā Shikishima, Kingyo to Pinpon
- Rokumeikan
- Wakatte tamaru ka!
- Utsurowanu Ai: Unchanging Love
- Dateuha Yukkuri to Suna o hamu no da
