= Battle Skipper =

Japanese OVA series

- Battle Skipper DVD cover

美少女遊撃隊バトルスキッパー (Lovely-Girl Commando Unit)
- Genre: Comedy, Mecha
- Original video animation
- Directed by: Takashi Watanabe
- Produced by: Kantaro Tomiyama; Wakō Higuchi
- Music by: Takeo Miratsu
- Studio: Artmic & Tokyo Kids
- Licensed by: NA: Central Park Media
- Released: August 23, 1995
- Episodes: 3

Battle Skipper (Japanese: 美少女遊撃隊バトルスキッパー, Hepburn: Bishōjo Yuugekitai; lit. "Lovely-Girl Commando Unit Battle Skipper") is a Japanese direct-to-video animated series based on the small toy mecha action figures by Tomy. The series was released in the US by Central Park Media.

== Plot ==
The OVA focuses mostly on the girls of St Ignacio's School for girls than the mecha itself. There are two clubs to join: The Debutante Club (華麗部, Kareibu; "Glamour Club"), where admission is said to lead to ultimate success; or The Etiquette Club (礼法部, Reihōbu; "Manners Club"), which is said to teach the values of common courtesy in the world.

Three freshmen join the Etiquette club rather than the popular Debutante Club and soon discover its founding members are part of a secret task force called Exters (ExStars in the dubbed version). Fan service is a predominated feature in the transformation sequence. The battles are not only for school hierarchy, but to save the world.

== Story ==
- Episode 1: The Lightning is Mine to Command!

The story opens as Sayaka Kitaouji takes off from space and head towards Earth in her private shuttle where Todou briefs her on Uruyasu's stocks. On Earth, at St. Ignacio's School for Girls, two freshmen Saori Tachibana and Shihoko Sakaki head towards Orientation Day in the school's auditorium. Sayaka makes a powerful speech in order to receive more members for the already popular Debutante Club. Etiquette Club VP Rie Shibusawa tries her best to make a speech herself but ends up failing as president Reika Ayanokoji looks on in disbelief. The failed speech inspires Shihoko to join the Etiquette Club and brings Saori and their newfound friend Kanami Ezaki to the clubhouse. Once inside, arrows came flying out. Saori ducks under one, Kanami chops another in midair, but Shihoko was hit with the arrow. Luckily, it was a prop arrow. Reika and Rie explain everything about the Etiquette Club in detail to the new girls in hopes of improving their skills. At the end of the day, Sayaka heads off campus and informs Todou to take some men and rob the Mitsuido Bank, a bank that finances most of Uruyasu. Later that night, Saori, Shihoko and Kanami each sneak into the Etiquette Clubhouse and try to uncover its secret. They soon discover an underground base with Battle Skippers. Each of the girls pilot the Battle Skippers to where Reika and Rie are: the Mitsuido Bank. To the shock of Reika and Rie and even Todou's men, the new girls arrived and stopped the robbery. Todou decided to cut his losses and run, but his associates were soon captured by Reika and Rie and handed them over to the authorities. Back at base, Rie scolded Kanami, Saori and Shihoko for their reckless and foolish act, but Reika calmed her down and decided to welcome the girls as official members of Exters.

- Episode 2: A Heartache Tonight

With the Mitsuido Bank robbery a bust, Sayaka takes her anger out on Todou for his cowardice. In order to get back in her good graces, Todou hatches a plan to lure of the new members of Exters to deliver the AIES to Makuhari. Sayaka accepts his offer and warns him not to disappoint her again. Back at school in the Etiquette Club, Rie rides Saori, Shihoko and Kanami like a drill sergeant to make them stronger and powerful pilots. Nearby, the robbers from the Mitsuido heist are joined by another man and Todou steps out in a priest's outfit. The next day, Saori heads off to school alone and is confronted by Todo's gang who try to rape her until Todou assaults them and knocks them down. Saori is immediately awe-struck with Todo who introduces himself as "Brother Gilbert". At school, Todou becomes the substitute teacher and easily gains Saori's trust. She hoped to kiss him to repay him for saving her life, but instead Todou slips a drug into her mouth which has hypnotic effects. Soon, Saori was ordered under hypnosis to retrieve the AIES from her Battle Skipper and bring it to him and to make sure to dispose of anyone who interferes. However, the remaining Exters snap Saori out of her trance and explain Todou's deceit. Infuriated that she was used, Saori unleashes her anger on Todou, but not before his men destroy the base and rescue him. The Exters chase the Makuhari Battle Skippers all over Tokyo and Saori decides to use the AIES combat software to pay back Todou. However, Todou has tricks up his sleeve as well as his Battle Skipper and 3 other Makuhari Battle Skippers form a giant robot. Reika and Rie use their own Battle Skippers to form a powerful ring of energy to destroy the giant robot and force Todou and his men to retreat. Back at their ruined base, Reika reveals to the Exters the true base known as "Josephine Rose".

- Episode 3: The Super-Radical One-Night Show

Having figured out the identities of the Exters, Sayaka hopes to be rid of them once and for all. She had the principal of St. Ignacio's force the Etiquette Club to disband within 24 hours or face expulsion. Reika knows this is all a Makuhari plot and heads towards their main building. Upon arrival, she is held captive. At night, the remaining Exters hold off Sayaka's Four Divas (leaders of the sports clubs who do Sayaka's dirty work). Kanami easily disposes of the Four Divas and join Rie, Saori and Shihoko in Josephine Rose to rescue Reika. Suddenly, a large fortress appears with Sayaka and Todou at the helm hoping to bring down the Exters forever, but Josephine Rose held its own and unleashes its own power to knock out the flying fortress. As if things weren't bad for Sayaka, her mother overheard everything happening at school. She informs Sayaka that she's reinstated the Etiquette Club in order to teach her humility and modesty, and should a cowardly act be repeated, there would be consequences. Sayaka swallows her pride and accepts her loss and calls a retreat. The show ends with the Exters proud of defending their club, their honor and the rest of the world.

== Main characters ==
- Reika Ayanokouji

Reika Ayanokoji (綾小路 玲香, Ayanokoji Reika) is the President of the Etiquette Club and heiress of Uruyasu Heavy Industries. Reika is soft-spoken and always protective of the secrets of the Battle Skippers, fearing they might fall into evil hands. Reika is a blood relative of her spoiled rival Sayaka Kitaouji. Voiced by: Kikuko Inoue (Japanese); Nicole D'Incecco (English)

- Rie Shibusawa (mispronounced as "Rye" in the English dub)

Rie Shibusawa (渋沢 里絵, Shibusawa Rie) is the Vice-president of the Etiquette Club. Rie is usually brash, hot-headed and unpredictable, a foil for Reika's cool head. Rie is equally strong on the battlefield as Reika and is ever loyal to her and her family. Rie has an extreme hatred for the Debutante Club and is a struggling student at St. Ignacio's. Voiced by: Shiho Niiyama (Japanese); Karen Smith (English)

- Saori Tachibana

Saori Tachibana (立花 沙織, Tachibana Saori) is a freshman at St. Ignacio's who originally wanted to join the Debutante Club, but was coaxed by Shihoko to join the Etiquette Club instead. Saori was made to mimic Sailor Moon's hairstyle, but all similarity ends there. Most fan service is towards Saori on occasion. Voiced by: Chinami Nishimura (Japanese); Lisa Ortiz (English)

- Kanami Ezaki

Kanami Ezaki (江崎 佳奈未, Ezaki Kanami) is a meganekko and freshman at St. Ignacio's who joined the Etiquette Club for her detestment of Sayaka Kitaouji and the Debutante Club. Kanami is one of the smartest girls in Japan and secretly one of the strongest, in which Reika and Rie already know. Kanami quickly became close friends with Saori and Shihoko on her first day. Voiced by: Yuri Shiratori (Japanese); Kira Burke (English)

- Shihoko Sakaki

Shihoko Sakaki (榊志 穂子, Sakaki Shihoko) is a freshman at St. Ignacio's and Saori's childhood friend. After seeing Rie's failed speech of asking people to join the Etiquette Club, Shihoko decides to join. Shihoko may be shy and frail, but she never gives up. Shihoko looks to Rie like an older sister. Voiced by: Yuko Miyamura (Japanese); Elisa Wain (English)

- Sayaka Kitaouji

Sayaka Kitaouji (北大路 紗綾花, Kitaōji Sayaka) is the president of the Debutante Club, heiress of Makuhari Heavy Industries and the main antagonist of the series. Sayaka wants a Japan ruled by women as powerful as her to dominate the world. Most of the income for St. Ignacio's is funded by Makuhari Industries and because of this, Sayaka and the Debutante Club feel like they can get away with everything at school. However, Sayaka's plans to eliminate the Etiquette Club backfire on her as her mother funded the Etiqutte Club in order to teach Sayaka respect and courtesy towards others. Voiced by: Ai Orikasa (Japanese); Tamara Farias (English)

- Todou

Todou (藤堂, Todō) is Sayaka's personal assistant and whipping boy. He is a bishōnen who would do anything for Sayaka, since he has a crush on her. On the battlefield, Todou is equally cunning and ruthless in his goals to crush the Exters and securing Makuhari as the only sole survivor of the mechanical industry war. Voiced by: Toshiyuki Morikawa (Japanese); Paul McGrane (English)

== The Battle Skippers ==
The Battle Skippers are tank like robots each with an AIES expert system connected to enhance the pilot's movement. The manufacturers names are Makuhari Heavy Industries (幕張重工, Makuhari Jūkō), Uruyasu Heavy Industries (浦安重工, Uruyasu Jūkō), Toyomoto Construction (豊本技建, Toyomoto Giken) and Grand Rover (グランローバー, Guran Rōbā). The Battle Skippers piloted by the Exters are Uruyasu while those piloted by the Debutante Club are Makuhari. Saori's Battle Skipper has a Kansai accent while Rie's has more of an Osaka dialect ("country" dialect in the dub).

The Battle Skippers of Uruyasu

- BSX-01 Testa Road (トスタロード, Testarōdo) Reika's red Battle Skipper. It can form a Bifractal Circle with Sky Cats. Testa Road is adapted for high-speed chases and pursuits, which is why it was named for the look and feel of the Ferrari Testarossa.
- BSX-02 Sky Cats (スカイキャッツ, Sukaikyattsu) Rie's white Battle Skipper which has an Osakan dialect ("country" dialect in the English dub). It can form a Bifractal Circle with Testa Road. Like its name suggests, Sky Cats is an aerial tactics Battle Skipper.
- BSX-03 Mega Diver (メガダイバー, Megadaibā) Saori's blue Battle Skipper with the obnoxious Kansai accent. When Saori understood the combat software within the AIES, she unleashed it on Todou and his men. Mega Diver is adapted for deep sea excavations and underwater reconnaissance.
- BSX-04 Night Walker (ナイトウォーカー, Naitouōkā) Kanami's purple Battle Skipper. Night Walker has built-in hovercraft parts and is mostly used for stealth missions and espionage.
- BSX-05 Grand Buster (グランバスター, Guranbasutā) Shihoko's green Battle Skipper. In the Japanese CD drama, the AIES of Grand Buster is said to have a childish personality, something almost fitting for Shihoko. As it's aptly named, Grand Buster is the Battle Skipper has a fully stocked arsenal of hybrid weapons.

The Battle Skippers of Makuhari

- Death Head (デスヘッド, Desuheddo) The combination of 4 Battle Skippers including Todou's to form a giant robot (named "Unity" in the English dub). Its size was gigantic but its movement was sluggish, and eventually it was destroyed by the Exters and the Bifractal Circle (a ring of electromagnetic energy).

Other Battle Skippers

- Galmet (ガルメット, Garumetto) The Galmet was shown in the Japanese commercial feature on the Battle Skipper video. In the anime series itself, the Galmet are the standard issue Battle Skippers for the police customized in black and white for police use only.
