= Naming controversy =

A naming controversy or naming dispute is a controversy surrounding terminology:

- Geographical naming disputes
- Ethnonymy
  - List of ethnic slurs
  - List of religious slurs
