= M.D. Geist =

1986 original video animation

- DVD cover

装鬼兵M.D.ガイスト (Sōkihei M.D. Geist)
- Genre: Adventure, Mecha
- Original video animation

Most Dangerous Soldier
- Directed by: Hayato Ikeda
- Written by: Riku Sanjō
- Music by: Yōichi Takahashi
- Studio: Production Wave; Zero-G Room (Director's Cut scenes)
- Licensed by: NA: US Manga Corps (1992–2009) ADV Films (2009); UK: Kiseki Films
- Released: May 21, 1986; March 1, 1996 (Director's Cut)
- Runtime: 40 minutes 50 minutes (Director's Cut)
- Original video animation

Death Force
- Directed by: Koichi Ohata
- Written by: Riku Sanjō
- Music by: Yoshiaki Ohuchi
- Studio: Zero-G Room
- Licensed by: NA: U.S. Manga Corps AEsir Holdings
- Released: March 1, 1996
- Runtime: 45 minutes

M.D. Geist (Japanese: 装鬼兵M.D.ガイスト, Hepburn: Sōkihei M.D. Gaisuto; literally "Armoured Demon Soldier M.D. Geist") is an anime and comic book series about a post-apocalyptic world.

Geist (the main character) is colloquially referred to as Most Dangerous Soldier, genetically engineered to outperform other soldiers during a long war on a planet known as Jerra. He was placed in suspended animation in a stasis pod orbiting the planet as a result of his extremely overwhelming method of fighting until it crashed several years later, awakening him and returning him to the war on the planet.

== Synopsis ==
=== M.D. Geist I ===
On a planet known as Jerra, the rebellious Negsrom Army is locked in a war with the Jerra Regular Army. Geist, the commander of the Regular Army special forces, is genetically-engineered by means of a new scientific process termed 'Bioclone theory'. He was so extraordinarily ferocious in battle that he was ordered placed in suspended animation aboard a stasis satellite and launched into Jerra's orbit. After several years, the satellite crashes on Jerra and Geist reawakens.

In a desolated city, Geist discovers a group of bandits, whose leader kills a stray soldier wearing a powered suit. Geist confronts the bandit leader over acquiring the soldier's suit and kills him in a fight to the death. Paia, the mistress of the former leader, is attracted to Geist's strength, but other than her knowledge of both armies' activities, Geist shows no desire for her. Geist, as the new leader of the bandits, spots a Regular Army land battleship, the Noah Guards, under attack by Negsrom forces and finds an opportunity to save the battleship for a price. Geist, with Paia, forms an uneasy alliance with the crew of the Noah Guards, led by Colonel Crutes, before participating in a mission to stop the Regular Army doomsday device "Death Force" from activation. Death Force's countdown commenced shortly after a high-ranking official figure in the Regular Army was assassinated. Its purpose is to annihilate all life forms on Jerra without discrimination.

Geist equips himself with the acquired powered suit which he has customised and modified to reflect his fighting ability, and takes part in an assault on the Brain Palace, where the computer that is responsible for the Death Force is housed. All but Geist and Crutes are killed during the invasion. Upon reaching their target, Geist faces an advanced security robot activated by Crutes, who reveals that he intends to kill Geist as well. While Geist battles the robot, Crutes manages to deactivate the countdown. However, he discovers that the robot has failed and is killed by Geist. When Paia arrives at the control room, she is terrified to learn that Geist's goal was to activate the Death Force.

=== M.D. Geist II: Death Force ===
Less than a year after the Death Force activated, Geist has been hunting the Death Force machines. The remnants of the human population, including Paia, have been rescued by a warlord named Krauser. Krauser is a product of the same genetic engineering as Geist, and is Geist's predecessor, but he must undergo routine augmentation as the Bioclone process does not self-replicate during battle, whereas Geist's does. Krauser uses a camouflage technology that hides his mobile fortress and his soldiers from the Death Force. When he encounters Geist, Krauser initially defeats Geist, throwing him from a bridge in the fortress. Some time after, Krauser and the amalgamated Regular Army and Negsrom Army forces plan to lure the Death Force machines into an artificial city and detonate the lethal "Jignix Bomb" to exterminate them.

With the help of a contemptuous cyborg known as Eagle, Geist is able to arm himself and locate Krauser at the artificial city. He destroys the camouflage device he has been using and leads the Death Force to Krauser's fortress, leaving Krauser's forces to be destroyed in the Jignix Bomb's detonation. Although most of the Death Force is destroyed in the explosion, a large number of the machines fall upon Krauser's fortress while Krauser confronts Geist in hand-to-hand combat. While the Death Force machines consume most of the refugees, an explosion rips through the fortress and Krauser is ultimately killed. Paia and Eagle appear amongst the survivors, but Geist is nowhere to be seen.

=== M.D. Geist: Ground Zero ===
Ground Zero is an English-language comic book-only edition published by CPM Comics as an original prequel.

At a Regular Army briefing, Lieutenant Leigh Wong presents the latest combat record on Geist, a new genetically-engineered soldier. She is dispatched to a base along with Geist to meet with Colonel Stanton. Stanton rejects Geist, regarding him as impersonal. However, an incident occurs on the base in which Geist carries out an order to the letter and maims a sergeant, which Wong views as confirmation of Geist's efficiency.

With Geist and Wong in tow, Stanton and his men locate their target in the ruins of a temple. They investigate the ship which is stationed in the temple, but Stanton's men are ambushed by enemy forces. Onboard, Wong discovers an order for the enemy forces to fire a warhead at their own city, and that the order has originated from the Earth Government, violating a nuclear treaty. Unable to stop the ship, Stanton and Geist plan to destroy the engines, but before they proceed, Stanton strictly orders Geist to tell no one of this discovery, even if Geist outlives him. The two of them battle an enemy piloted machine that is guarding the engines, in which Stanton is fatally wounded. Dying, he accepts Geist at last. Geist successfully defeats the enemy machine and manages to escape while the ship crashes. Wong remains trapped on the ship as Geist departs.

After the ship crashes and its nuclear payload explodes, Geist is recovered by a patrol unit. Tried officially by a council, Geist does not speak of what happened on the mission, as per Stanton's order. Colonel Crutes judges that Geist is responsible for the deaths of Regular Army personnel and therefore imprisons him in stasis aboard a satellite orbiting Jerra.

== Japanese Voice Cast ==
Character	1986 Edition	Director's Cut/Death Force
Geist	Norio Wakamoto	Kazuhiro Nakata
Paia	Fumi Hirano	Rika Matsumoto
Crutes	Akio Nojima	Unshō Ishizuka
Golem	Takeshi Watabe	Hisao Egawa
Mash	Hirotaka Suzuoki	Tomokazu Seki
Gista	Banjō Ginga	Takashi Nagasako
Beast	Yūsaku Yara	Yasunori Masutani
Hans	Hideyuki Hori	Keiji Fujiwara
Sakamoto	Naoki Tatsuta	Isshin Chiba
Krauser		Kaneto Shiozawa
Dr. Breston		Rokurou Naya
Eagle		Shinpachi Tsugi
Negsrom Commander		Takaya Hashi

== Production History ==
=== Pre-Production ===
Sōkihei M.D. Geist was initially not conceived as being on video. During drafting, the working title was "Death Force" and the story involved an unstable soldier, named Patrick Murphy, who was imprisoned on a lost spaceship, and is then rescued by allies in powered suits. A mission then commences to stop the computer aboard the ship, which has enacted a program to kill the remaining survivors.

Koichi Ohata developed the project to give himself creative freedom as a mechanical designer. Ohata's inspiration for designing the armoured suits came from a conversation with staff from Nippon Sunrise Inc., regarding the functionality of a giant robot and a suit of armour in relation to a human character, prior to production. The project was granted as a video when Ohata's concept of the armoured suit was noticed by the president of the production company. Ohata was highly-influenced by international films such as Mad Max, The Terminator and The Texas Chain Saw Massacre, and felt that the new technology afforded by video could produce something similar in Japanese animation.

=== 1986 Release ===
Riku Sanjō, then new at the time as a screenwriter, developed the story through multiple consultation meetings with Ohata, in which there was an emphasis on visual motifs and scene direction. While the initial script was written to the length of 45-minutes, Hayato Ikeda encouraged Sanjō to write as much as possible in order for him and Ohata to express their ideas fully. Up to 200 pages of manuscript were written during planning, and it was agreed between Ohata, Ikeda and unit director Hiroshi Negishi to focus on action sequences, so numerous plot points were cut. A later working title during production was "Sokihei Billion Buster", with some differences in the story, such as the biker gang's name being "Metal Cetus". Another draft of the story focused on the intensely demanding conditions of the feature powered suit being crossed with the uncontrollable nature of Geist.

Ikeda confessed to being new to mecha, as well as being new to OVA as a format, and performed as a mediator on the overall production, with the majority of creative decisions being handled by Ohata. Ikeda's credits as a director of TV anime made him more appealing for marketing. Ohata's directing, as a result of his inexperience as a 23-year old, proved difficult for the animators. According to animation director Kenichi Onuki, the character designs and mechanical designs both contained a high number of lines and were a source of contention for the animators. Ohata took on key animation as well as storyboarding duties, Onuki was also involved in the line clean-up process. Ohata was responsible for the core mechanical designs, but other staff such as Yasuhiro Moriki were involved in the finalising process. Sequences such as the final fight scenes were envisioned to take place in a brightly-lit environment with detailed backgrounds, but due to constraints, simpler choices had to be made. Art director Yoshinori Takao recalled having difficulty deciding upon the lighting, with the added complexity of character movement during the scene. Ohata admitted that the background was set too dark and that the intended design would have been too demanding on his staff. Other storyboarded sequences, such as a fight between Geist and Colonel Crutes, were ultimately cut.

=== 1996 Release ===
When it was released in 1992 in the United States by Central Park Media, M.D. Geist achieved a brief period of significant popularity, eventually appearing the Billboard Top 40 Video Charts. Domestic sales of the OVA prompted Central Park Media to collaborate with Koichi Ohata in producing a sequel. In 1995, Central Park Media's print division, CPM Comics, contracted Tim Eldred to produce a Japanese-American collaboration comic book adaptation of M.D. Geist and an original prequel edition. This would coincide with a re-release of the first animated edition and a sequel. The comic book adaptation was based on the English translation of the initial 1986 OVA, which followed several misattributions of dialogue in the domestic Central Park Media release. The naming conventions therefore follow this translation, in which the character Paia is known as "Vaiya", Negsrom is rendered as both "Nexrum" and "Negstrom", and Colonel Crutes is rendered as "Kurtz". Ohata also contributed covers and splash pages.

Following this adaptation, in June 1995, Ohata produced a written outline under the working title of "M.D. Geist Zero" for the prequel edition. Ohata also contributed additional mechanical designs for the Negsrom characters. The outline would be further developed during consultation processes between CPM Comics personnel, Eldred and Ohata. The finished version was released as M.D. Geist: Ground Zero. In Japan, the production of a new edition of the first OVA, and a sequel episode, was underway with production company Zero-G Room. The Director's Cut, released in Japan as Perfect Edition, features approximately five minutes of new footage, including a new prologue and epilogue sequence, digital edits and a new audio track. M.D. Geist: Director's Cut and M.D. Geist II: Death Force were both released in 1996.

== Release ==
M.D. Geist was originally released in Japan by Nippon Columbia in 1986 and re-released under the Denon label in 1996. In 1988, a trailer of the OVA under the title "Thunder Warrior" was produced by Gaga Communications along with other prospective anime titles that were pitched to the North American market. M.D. Geist was released in North America by Central Park Media in 1992; two years prior, the company used Geist as the logo for their mainstream anime label U.S. Manga Corps. Months later, Central Park Media released M.D. Geist II: Death Force.

In the United States, the Sci Fi Channel premiered M.D. Geist I and II during their Ani-Monday block at midnight E.S.T. September 29 and October 6, 2008 respectively. Following the closure of Central Park Media, M.D. Geist was re-licensed by ADV Films and was re-released on DVD in July 2009. It is currently available for digital download on iTunes by Manga Entertainment, along with Now and Then, Here and There.

== Reception ==
Darius Washington from Otaku USA magazine defined the original version of M.D. Geist as "an entertaining action vid with okay production values, unique elements and a psychotically fun twist". The owner of Central Park Media, John O'Donnell, jokingly named it "the best bad anime ever made".
