= Whatever (slang) =

English slang term

Whatever is a slang term meaning "whatever you say", "I don't care what you say" or "what will be will be". The term is used either to dismiss a previous statement and express indifference or in affirmation of a previous statement as "whatever will be will be". An interjection of "whatever" can be considered offensive and impolite or it can be considered affirming. In the late 20th century and early 21st century, the word became a sentence in its own right; in effect an interjection, often but not always, used as a passive-aggressive conversational blocking tool, leaving the responder without a convincing retort.

The verbal interjection may be accompanied by the speaker raising two hands with the fingers forming a "W" shape.

== History ==
Early examples of current usage include a 1965 episode of Bewitched in which the character Endora exclaims "All right, whatever" to her daughter, lead character Samantha Stephens, and also the much maligned 1965 sitcom My Mother the Car, in which "whatever" was the standard retort used by Captain Manzini (Avery Schreiber) whenever he would mispronounce "Crabtree" (Jerry Van Dyke), the car's owner (son).

== Abbreviations ==
A shorter version, "Evs", made it into American pop consciousness when used by Australian rocker Toby Rand on the American reality television series Rock Star: Supernova. It can also be abbreviated as w/e.

== Cultural impact ==
In Marist College polls of 2009 and 2010, whatever was voted as the phrase that is "the most annoying word in conversation." The English translation of Michel Houellebecq's 1994 novel Extension du domaine de la lutte, which describes the chronically disaffected life of a computer programmer, was titled Whatever for its publication in the United States.
