= Kantaro Tomiyama =

Japanese businessman

Kantaro Tomiyama (富山 幹太郎, Tomiyama Kantarō; born January 22, 1954) is the chairman of the giant Japanese toy, children's merchandise and entertainment company, Tomy Company, Ltd. (known as Takara Tomy in Japanese).

Kantaro Tomiyama was born in 1954 in Tokyo, Japan and is the grandson of the founder of Tomy, Eiichiro Tomiyama. In 1982, Kantaro entered Tomy after graduation from University of Hull in Britain. He became president of Tomy in 1986.
