= Genocyber =

Cyberpunk manga

- Cover of the manga.

ジェノサイバー虚界の魔獣 (Jenosaibā: Kyōkai no Majū)
- Genre: Body horror; Cyberpunk
- Manga
- Written by: Tony Takezaki
- Published by: Byakuya Shobo
- English publisher: NA: Viz Media
- Magazine: Comic Nova
- Original run: 1992 – 1993
- Volumes: 1
- Original video animation
- Directed by: Koichi Ohata
- Produced by: Shinji Aramaki (#1); Masashi Abe (#2–5); Minoru Takanashi (#1–3); Kazumi Kawashiro (#4–5); Shin Unozawa (executive)
- Written by: Koichi Ohata; Shō Aikawa (#1); Emu Arii (#2–5)
- Music by: Hiroaki Kagoshima; Takehito Nakazawa
- Studio: Artmic & Artland
- Licensed by: NA: U.S. Manga Corps (former); Discotek Media (current); UK: Manga Entertainment
- Released: May 24, 1994 – July 21, 1994
- Runtime: 45 minutes (#1); 25–30 minutes (#2–5)
- Episodes: 5

Genocyber: The Beauty Devil from Psychic World (ジェノサイバー虚界の魔獣, Jenosaibā: Kyōkai no Majū; lit. 'Genocyber: A Cyber Monster from the Imaginary World') is a 1992 Japanese manga series by Tony Takezaki. One volume of the manga has been published, but the multi-volume story arc remains unfinished. The published book was adapted by Koichi Ohata into a five-part original video animation (OVA) series in 1994. The plot of the anime differs significantly from the manga. Both are notable for their extreme graphic violence.

The OVA was produced by Bandai Visual and released in North America by U.S. Manga Corps. Genocyber was also released by Manga Entertainment's UK and Australian Divisions in The Cyberpunk Collection but only episodes 1–3 were released in these regions; this collection also included two other cyberpunk OVAs, Cyber City Oedo 808 and A.D. Police Files. The remaining two parts were not released into English until U.S. Manga Corp obtained the rights and had Central Park Media dub the remaining two episodes that were not dubbed by Manga UK.

In September 2020, Discotek Media announced they have acquired the distribution rights to Genocyber.

== Plot ==
=== Episode 1: A New Life Form ===
The world's nations are beginning to form a new global government. The first OVA is centered around a young girl named Elaine and details the development and creation of a "Genocyber", an ultimate biological weapon created by combining the powers and consciousness of two psychic sisters. The project is directed by a mad scientist and funded by the Kuryu Group, a huge Japanese corporation that is a world leader in military research. Starting off in Hong Kong, the story follows Elaine. She is central to the ambitions of the scientist who wants to combine her powers with those of her crippled sister, Diana, to activate the Genocyber. Both were children of a former colleague of the scientist, whom he betrayed to receive funding for his research.

In its physical form, Genocyber is a gigantic humanoid monster, which the scientist calls a Vajra. (Note: Vajra is a Sanskrit word meaning both "thunderbolt" and "diamond". In Buddhism, the Vajra is the symbol of Vajrayana, one of the three major branches of Buddhism, and can imply the thunderbolt experience of Buddhist enlightenment or bodhi as well as indestructibility (diamonds are the hardest natural material known).) In addition to having almost unlimited strength and regenerative abilities, Genocyber also possesses incredible telekinetic and pyrokinetic powers.

After a search by the scientist and his masked henchmen for Elaine that kills dozens, Elaine is chased by cyborg agents of the Kuryu group, and the scientist is later arrested for going rogue and conducting his own research without the group's approval. During a battle where Diana wears a cybernetic suit of her own to try to catch her, Elaine supposedly dies, which leads to the cyborgs arresting the scientist and collecting Diana. However, Elaine (from within Diana) then uses her psychic power to merge with her and become Genocyber. In the ensuing battle, in which the scientist is killed, huge fires are started, and numerous buildings are heavily damaged, Genocyber also destroys the cyborg agents. The next morning, Elaine finds that her only friend, a young homeless boy called Rat, whom she met before she was captured, has died after falling from a construction site, likely having been dropped by Wakayama, one of the Kuryu cyborgs. Elaine becomes filled with anger and screams, turning into Genocyber, and initiating a massive explosion which completely destroys Hong Kong, leaving only a barren wasteland in its place.

=== Episodes 2–3: Vajranoid Attack & Global War ===
The second OVA apparently occurs shortly after the first one ended. A country called Karain has withdrawn from the United Nations (in protest of the new world government) and launched an invasion of a neighboring country. In response, the United States agrees to deploy a Carrier strike group to support offensive operations against Karain. This fleet is to be led by the Alexandria, a massive futuristic Supercarrier stationed off the coast of Japan.

However, satellite photographs have identified an unknown superweapon believed to have been deployed by Karain (in fact, the image is of Genocyber, which destroyed several helicopters after they attacked and killed Elaine's friends). Concerned about the power of this new weapon, the United States military requests assistance from the Kuryu Group. Realizing that the image is of Genocyber (although this is kept secret), the Kuryu Group agrees to send a team of its top scientists to the Alexandria. The Kuryu scientists, including the mentally unstable Sakomizu, bring on board a newly created Vajra, anticipating that the fleet will encounter Genocyber.

Unlike Genocyber, this new Vajra has a completely robotic body that enables it to fuse with any machine or weapon it operates. This is demonstrated when the Vajra fuses with a fighter aircraft, enhancing the fighter's capabilities far beyond anything possible for a human pilot.

As the fleet travels from Japan to Karain, the Vajra is conducting a test flight in a fighter when a UN scout plane operating near Karain radios in and requests to make an emergency landing. The pilot also has aboard a civilian he rescued near Karain: Elaine. As the scout plane approaches the carrier, Elaine senses the Vajra, which in turn senses Elaine. Alarmed, the Vajra's fighter veers wildly off course in pursuit of the scout plane, entering into a steep dive and narrowly avoiding crashing into the carrier. The scout plane is forced to make a crash landing on the carrier deck, although Elaine survives unscathed and is taken into the care of the crew.

The carrier's senior officers sharply rebuke Sakomizu for the Vajra's strange behavior, yelling that his Vajra is not only dangerous but also uncontrollable. Later, Sakomizu yells at the Vajra for embarrassing him.

Unlike in the previous OVA, Elaine now has a largely cybernetic body from the neck down. Although it is unclear why and how this change occurred, it is possible that Elaine and Diana (whose body was cybernetic) have completely merged.

A young female doctor, Myra, takes Elaine under her protection and gives her the name Laura. To Myra, Laura/Elaine reminds her of her own daughter (also named Laura) who died in the plane crash depicted in the first episode of the OVA, when Genocyber was fighting with the Kuryu cyborgs. Although Elaine is still mute, she is able to communicate telepathically with Myra, with whom she forms a special bond. Almost immediately, Myra comes to think of Elaine as her own child.

Neither Myra nor the crew are aware of the girl's psychic abilities, and her presence on board is briefly uneventful. However, numerous members of the crew begin experiencing nightmarish hallucinations, and several suffer mental breakdowns. Soon after, the Vajra again senses Elaine and interprets her presence (i.e., Genocyber's presence) as a threat to itself and the ship. Elaine also senses the new Vajra, and, after seeking it out, transforms into Genocyber and destroys it, though Genocyber's arm is hacked off during the fight. The ship's crew, unaware of what actually happened, simply conclude that Sakomizu's Vajra has malfunctioned again and blame him for the incident (once again, Elaine survives without injury). However, Sakomizu, upon seeing his Vajra destroyed, is insulted and wrongly concludes that the crew sabotaged his work, although he now clearly suspects that Elaine is more than she appears to be. He eventually creates a new Vajra after acquiring Genocyber's severed arm but is unable to control it; the Vajra then expands throughout the carrier, engulfing and consuming the entire crew, except for Myra, whom Genocyber saves. Sakomizu also appears to survive initially, before he too is consumed by the Vajra.

Later, Myra is rescued by a Karain helicopter as its pilots investigate the remains of the American fleet. Deciding that Myra is delirious, they fly back to Karain, but are horrified to discover that the entire country has been devastated. Genocyber then rises in the sky and spreads its wings, confirming that Karain has suffered a similar fate as Hong Kong. The episode ends with Genocyber flying away, as Myra, who has been driven to madness by the events, yells for Elaine, who she now truly believes to be Laura, to come back to her.

=== Episodes 4–5: Legend of the City of the Grand Ark, Part I and Part II ===
The fourth OVA onward are much different from its previous ones in terms of setting, taking place in a post-apocalyptic earth, in a region called the City of the Grand Ark.

The young girl, Elaine, does not appear much in this episode, only a transparent image in the story. In this story, Genocyber eventually realizes that "there was no place in the world for its power" and is dormant until it reawakens at the end.

In a brief opening scene, the now-extremely elderly leader of the Kuryu Group is seen looking at a wall of computer screens that show Genocyber on a rampage of destruction. It is revealed that for 100 years, humanity has been waging a desperate and hopeless war against Genocyber, which has devastated the Earth. He vows to find some way to stop Genocyber, even if it takes centuries. All of a sudden, Genocyber attacks his location, and a massive explosion is seen to rise into the Earth's atmosphere. The next scene, apparently set further into the future, shows a massive space station, possibly a colony ship, orbiting Earth. Aboard the station, a computer monitor indicates that it is now the year 2400 AD.

The story starts out in Ark de Grande City (City of the Grand Ark), one of the last remaining cities on Earth, which is controlled by an evil mayor who claims that he is restoring the civilization that was destroyed by Genocyber, but only does this to gain trust from the civilians. The Mayor is ruthless, killing anyone who opposes him, and most of the city's population lives as an exploited labour class with few rights, while the mayor and an upper class live in luxury.

The story shifts to a couple, Ryu and Mel. Ryu is trying to find a doctor good enough to cure Mel's blindness. They arrive in Ark de Grande City but, as members of the lower class, are unable to get the medical help necessary to allow Mel to see again. Ryu and Mel attempt to earn money as performers since Mel possesses an extraordinary ability to determine appearances, colors, and numbers, even though she is blind. She describes her power as an ability to "see the person's form floating in [her] mind." She also has remarkable hearing and can often sense the environment around her. Ryu has the ability to throw knives while blindfolded and hit targets with pinpoint accuracy. After Ryu and Mel make love that night, Ryu says that he hopes to earn enough money so that they can leave the city as soon as possible.

Later, Ryu is recruited by a member of the upper class to perform at his establishment, promising a large sum of money. However, the man tricks Ryu (who is blindfolded) into throwing knives at a real person who is tied to a wall, killing him, much to the delight of the spectators. Realizing that he has been tricked, Ryu manages to escape but is now pursued by the city's guards. While Ryu and Mel try to hide in the ruins beneath the city, Mel hears Elaine's voice calling to her, and she and Mel find themselves in a ritual chamber with the seemingly fossilized head and torso of Genocyber at the center of an altar.

A flashback then shows Genocyber on a rampage of destruction. An image of Diana appears, and her voice calls to Elaine, telling her that "It has to end. We can't stay in this world. We can't use our power." The two sisters then join hands and disappear, while Genocyber appears lying on the ground, having seemingly been turned to stone. The scene shifts back to the present and to a shot of the massive space station orbiting the Earth.

In a series of images, Mel is seen walking with Diana towards Genocyber's broken body. An image of Elaine appears in front of Genocyber, and Diana screams. In a subsequent dream, Diana refers to Mel as "big sister."

The scene shifts back to Mel, who is taken in by the religious sect which opposes the mayor. The sect believes that the destruction brought by Genocyber was a punishment from God, and believe that Mel is God's messenger, who will prevent such destruction from happening again. Meanwhile, Ryu makes his way up to the surface, where he is detained and subject to brutal interrogation by the police, after which he is apparently declared brain-dead. As Mel worries about Ryu, it is revealed that she is pregnant with his child.

Under orders to destroy anyone opposing the mayor, the city's troops then attack the sect's church, killing everyone, including (apparently) Mel, whose bullet-riddled body lies on the ground with the bodies of children surrounding her.

In an apparent dream, Diana begs Elaine not to turn into Genocyber again, stating that "Our power has no place in this world." Mel, who appears to be in some sort of cocoon, asks Diana for help, stating that if she dies, the child she is carrying will never be born. She also states that she wants the city destroyed. Diana warns that asking for such power will unleash Genocyber, but it is too late: Genocyber awakens as Elaine, Diana, and Mel amalgamate into a red version of Genocyber, one which is much larger than its previous form. As Genocyber emerges, monitors aboard the orbiting space station switch on and begin recording the event. Genocyber then attacks the city, killing the mayor, and then all of its citizens. By the time Genocyber's rampage is over, the entire city has been left in ruins.

As Genocyber rises into the sky, whole pieces of the city's remains begin to tear away from the ground and rise into the air. Genocyber resurrects Mel and Ryu, and Mel is then torn from Genocyber; she and Ryu begin to slowly fall into the burning city. Genocyber then reverts to its earlier, smaller form, and images of Elaine and Diana are seen superimposed against Genocyber as it ascends into the sky. Genocyber then flies into space and attacks the orbiting space station, whose defenses open fire on Genocyber, but with no effect. Genocyber breaks into the station and watches a repeating broadcast of Genichiro Kuryu, the former leader of the Kuryu group, ordering his forces to destroy Genocyber. Diana's voice then calls to Elaine, and images of the girls superimposed against Genocyber are briefly seen before Genocyber begins to freeze itself and the entire space station. The station then falls out of orbit, and explodes as it enters the atmosphere.

The last scene shows Mel, who is no longer blind, and Ryu, lying unconscious in the ruins of the city. As Mel opens her eyes, she hears Diana's voice calling, "Big sister...", and the scene turns to the ruined body of Genocyber, while a baby is heard crying in the background.

A series of stills are interspersed with the main credits. They seem to show that Mel brought up her dark-haired, son alongside a blonde girl – a reincarnation of Elaine and/or Diana?

== Characters ==
Elaine: A young mute girl who seems to be innocent in appearance, but when merged with her less powerful counterpart, she becomes Genocyber, capable of mass destruction as seen in all three OVAs. Her friend was a young boy who devoted himself to protect her, but was unable to when the Kuryu cyborg agents killed him. After transforming into Genocyber for the first time from within her sister Diana after reminding her that Kuryu scientist; Kenneth Reed was not their real father, devastating a large chunk of Hong Kong and after seeing the death of the boy, this causes Elaine to go berserk and Genocyber completely wipes out all of Hong Kong. In the second OVA, Elaine is named "Laura" by a young doctor, Myra, who once had a daughter about that age but died in a plane accident caused by Genocyber in Hong Kong, but Myra is unaware of this. All this happens after Elaine becomes Genocyber again, avenging some children that she sees getting killed by a military attack squad and their spirits can later be seen by her. In the third OVA, Elaine appears much as in a dormant state, confined to her dream-like world with her older sister, Diana. It is not fully explained in the beginning, but is later revealed that both Elaine and Diana realized that their "power wasn't meant to be for this world" and they decided to go into a state of "seclusion", only to be reawakened when Genocyber decides to destroy the City of the Grand Ark, killing everyone except for Mel and Ryu. Genocyber then flies into space and destroys an orbiting space station with Kyuru's former leader on a screen, talking about the destruction of Genocyber. It is not known what happens to Genocyber afterward. It is implied through subsequent imagery that Elaine and Diana's consciousnesses still exist within Genocyber, although it is unknown if Genocyber is still alive or if Elaine (or Diana) can ever re manifest herself and return to normal as seen in the first two OVAs.

Diana: Elaine's older sister. She seems to have great power as well, but is almost nothing compared to her younger sister, as shown in part one of the OVA. Diana's body is completely artificial, except for her head, due to Kenneth Reed's harsh experiments on her, so that she could control Elaine and her Vajra energy. Diana is quite jealous of her sister's skills and abilities, which causes her to try to kill her sister several times, yet proves to be futile, though comes close where the two Kuryu cyborgs had Ellaine distracted by holding her young friend hostage. She merges with Elaine in the first OVA after being dismembered, with Elaine consciously controlling the body, and does not appear again until the third OVA. It is also noted that without mechanical parts, Diana is immobile.

Genocyber: The complete hybrid of the two sisters, Genocyber is the ultimate biological humanoid weapon (what its creator dubs a Vajra or Vajranoid) who is seemingly immortal and is nearly omnipotent. It is considered a god by the underground sect of the Grand Arc City. It fought with the Earth's forces for 100 years, but after the two sisters realized their mistake in existing in the world, they lay dormant underground. Its original appearance is a 7-foot (2.1 m) green monster with two horns protruding from its head. It also has angel-like wings that appear to glow when it flies. Its second form is much larger, taller than a skyscraper, causing mass destruction within the City of the Grand Ark. Its full form is a dragon-like creature. Exactly how Genocyber was created from the bodies and souls of the two sisters remains a mystery, but it is somehow connected to the Vajra energies that both sisters possess.

Kenneth Reed: Claiming to be Elaine's and Diana's father, he both supports them to become a hybrid strong enough to prove the power of Vajra. He is near succession when Elaine suddenly escapes. He eventually dies after being taken custody of the two Kuryu cyborgs, smiling as he watches his creation bloom out in the world.

Myra: A female doctor who only appears in the second OVA, who takes care of Elaine after she is rescued by a civilian plane. Myra is very protective of Elaine, especially when people push her around for her unusual animal-like behavior. Myra eventually survives the carrier's destruction thanks to Genocyber's protection, and is later rescued by two Karain soldiers though her sanity is well and truly lost by that time.

Mel: A beautiful, mysterious young woman who is blind and needs money for the operation to cure her, and obtains money by fortune-telling with her amazing psychic abilities. She is very calm and timid, and deeply in love with her boyfriend, Ryu. When she takes refuge in the underground sect, they believe her to be a messenger from God. She is depressed at the moment because of Ryu's disappearance and her pregnant state. She eventually dies at one point in the third OVA, along with the entire underground sect, but then is brought back to life by Genocyber when she and the two sisters fuse together as she states in the hyperdimensional mandala scene, "I want this city destroyed." She is cured of her blindness at the end. There seems to be some connection between her and Diana, since they constantly communicate in Mel's dreams, whom Diana also calls "Big sister." It's possible that Elaine also feels the same way about Mel.

Ryu: A handsome young man who is Mel's boyfriend. He aids in helping Mel cure her blindness, but does not have enough money to do so. One day, he is to throw knives at a target to gain money. He was tricked into killing a man and is pursued by the city's government. He is eventually caught and put into custody. He is later shown unconscious at the end of the third OVA with Mel, who wakes up to find her dearest asleep.

Genichiro Kuryu: The chairman of Kuryu, he was first introduced in the series as a young boy controlling a giant company. In the second OVA, he sends an attack on the country Karain by making the overall decision. In the third OVA, Genichiro has become an old man, fighting for over 100 years with Genocyber, which was all to no avail. He himself states, "Who created you to give you so much power?" He later appears in a screen in an outer-space object, repeating a phrase, "destroy the target (Genocyber)" over and over again. The mysterious object was frozen by Genocyber itself and perhaps destroyed. He was likely the one to have sent the cyborgs in the first OVA to retrieve the sisters and Kenneth Reed when he feels that the professor was acting more on his own than to the standards of his company.

Dr. Nguyen Morgan: Elaine and Diana's true father. He was the first to come up with an idea to create a Vajranoid, using the power of Vajra or 'mind shadows' whose power was limitless, and tries to achieve this by testing his wife Tanya by creating a mandala to carry out his work. He was assisted by Kenneth Reed, who later wanted the credit of producing such a weapon, and eventually betrays Morgan to the Kuryu group for more funding, of which Morgan was then killed. The time and place of the birth of Elaine and Diana are unknown, but they were born after an explosion took place at a research center, with a surviving Tanya. Nguyen Morgan appears only in the flashbacks of the first and second OVAs.

Sakomizu: A scientist who wishes to surpass Morgan's research and does this by also creating a vajranoid weapon. (This Vajuranoid seems to be disobedient, like Elaine, and does things by its own free will) He succeeds in creating a powerful Vajra, but it proves to be no match for Genocyber in combat. He eventually creates a second Vajra that was made from Genocyber's severed arm when it was fighting his first Vajra. Sakomizu becomes insane, as the Vajra absorbs the entire crew of the carrier Alexandria and eventually the whole ship. Sakomizu is also by this time controlled by the Vajra, only to be first attacked by Myra, and then killed by Elaine. He, like all scientists who attempted to create an ideal Vajra, died in the end.

Davey: A detective working for the Hong Kong Police Department who tried to uncover the sinister plans of the Kuryu group, but as he came close to finding out what's going on, Kenneth Reed and many of his masked staff find him, tied him to a bed and was disembowelled, exposing his internal organs.

Ketsu, Wakayama & Amachi: These three cyborg agents are sent to retrieve Elaine and Diana for the Kuryu group. Ketsu is killed by ripping open his own brain on a subway line when Elaine makes him think that there are bugs inside him. Both Wakayama and Amachi both transform into hideous cyborg abominations later on and both are destroyed by Genocyber. Amachi is torn apart, while Wakayama is smashed through an airplane, the same one that Mira's daughter; Laura was in, though that isn't revealed until the second OVA.

Captain: Captain of the Alexandria. He is also eventually fused with the ship's vajuranoid, and dies in the end with the entire crew when Genocyber emits its great power.

Mayor: An evil politician who is a hypocrite, and kills anyone who opposes the law of his city; the Grand Arc. He dies near the end when Genocyber throws his parade car into a building.

Master: A priest of the underground sect of the Grand Arc, who is convinced that Mel was a messenger from God. He, as well as the whole sect, including a young boy he is seen talking to, are killed by a task force sent by the mayor to eliminate the cult.

== Reception ==
Genocyber was criticized for its extremely graphic violence. Justin Sevakis from Anime News Network stated that the OVA "takes sadistic glee in being as graphic as possible" and "you have to be able to appreciate anger, the sort of nihilism and angst that fills and infects one's soul".

David Cox from Otaku USA magazine recommended the OVA "see Genocyber, you won't regret it" and highlighted "the impact of John Carpenters classic The Thing can be seen in Genocyber 1, as can slasher and gore spectacles of the sort celebrated in magazines like Film Threat and Fangoria".

In a 2020 retrospective, Comic Book Resources included Genocyber in the top 10 of "the great 90s Sci-Fi anime that have been forgotten".
