= 1987 in animation =

Events in 1987 in animation.

== Events ==
=== January ===
- January 21: The first episode of Legend of the Overfiend is broadcast.

=== March ===
- March 12: The first episode of Ovide and the Gang is broadcast.
- March 30: 59th Academy Awards: A Greek Tragedy by Nicole van Goethem wins the Academy Award for Best Animated Short Film.

=== April ===
- April 7: The first episode of Ox Tales airs, based on the Dutch comic strip Boes.
- April 18: The first episode of The Shoe People is broadcast.
- April 19: The Simpsons first airs as a series of shorts in The Tracey Ullman Show. This marks the debuts of Homer Simpson, Marge Simpson, Bart Simpson, Lisa Simpson and Maggie Simpson.
- April 20: G.I. Joe: The Movie is released on video instead of theatrically. Duke was originally set to die in this movie, but was rejected by Hasbro in response to Optimus Prime's death controversy as Duke became comatose during the battle instead.

=== May ===
- May 8: Garfield Goes Hollywood premieres on CBS.
- May 13: Frédéric Back's The Man Who Planted Trees is first released.
- May 22: Janice Karman's The Chipmunk Adventure is released, receiving mixed reviews. It became a cult classic years later.

=== June ===
- June 28: Snow White receives a star at the Hollywood Walk of Fame.

=== July ===
- July 10: The Brave Little Toaster is first released.

=== August ===
- August 7: The Care Bears Adventure in Wonderland premieres. The film dealt with financial problems, barely fixing the damages from the notorious prequel Care Bears Movie II: A New Generation. Michael Hirsh then declared, "It was just one sequel too many." As a regret, the film went into obscurity in the 2000s.

=== September ===
- September 12: The first episode of Fraggle Rock: The Animated Series airs.
- September 13: The first episode of Once Upon a Time...Life airs.
- September 14: The first episode of BraveStarr is broadcast.
- September 15: The first episode of The Adventures of Teddy Ruxpin is broadcast.
- September 18: The first episode of DuckTales is broadcast.
- September 19:
  - The first episode of Mighty Mouse: The New Adventures is broadcast.
  - The first episode of Popeye and Son airs, which ended after one season as it was considered a promotional failure to the original cartoons from the 1930s.
- September 26: The first episode of ALF: The Animated Series is broadcast, a spin-off of the live-action sitcom ALF.

=== October ===
- October 30: The first episodes of Mr. Bogus are broadcast on French television.

=== November ===
- November 15: The television film The Jetsons Meet the Flintstones is broadcast. This marks the only time Betty Rubble is voiced by Julie Dees, the original voice for Bubbles on Jabberjaw. Dees' input was higher-pitched than any of Betty's previous actresses, including the well-known Gay Autterson who gave up cast acting in 1985. Dees failed to repeat this as B.J. Ward, who was at the time cast as Betty's younger self on The Flintstone Kids, would take on Betty's role six years later.
- November 17: The first episode of Fireman Sam is broadcast.

=== December ===
- December 14: The first episode of Teenage Mutant Ninja Turtles airs.
- December 21: A Garfield Christmas premieres on CBS.
- December 25: Filmation's Pinocchio and the Emperor of the Night premieres, receiving negative reviews. This film caused a downfall for Filmation as Disney filed a lawsuit against the company for copyright infringement. Filmation won the suit on the grounds that Carlo Collodi's work was in the public domain. Filmation closed their doors after the completion of the Snow White sequel in 1989.

=== Specific date unknown ===
- The first Disney Legends are handed out.
- Todd Haynes releases Superstar: The Karen Carpenter Story, a mockumentary about singer Karen Carpenter acted out in stop-motion with Barbie dolls. in 1990, Haynes was sued by Richard Carpenter, causing the movie to be withdrawn from distribution.

== Awards ==
- Annecy International Animated Film Festival Grand prix du long métrage: When the Wind Blows.

== Films released ==
- January 1 - Don Quixote of La Mancha (Australia)
- January 21 - Hell Target (Japan)
- February 7 - Monica and the Mermaid of the River (Brazil)
- February 21:
  - Mugen Shinshi: Bōken Katsugeki Hen (Japan)
  - Rusinoita (Finland)
- March 14:
  - Bats & Terry (Japan)
  - Doraemon: Nobita and the Knights on Dinosaurs (Japan)
  - Grimm Douwa: Kin no Tori (Japan)
  - Royal Space Force: The Wings of Honneamise (Japan)
- March 18 - The Big Bang (France and Belgium)
- March 21 - Laughing Target (Japan)
- March 25 - Digital Devil Story: Megami Tensei (Japan)
- April 4 - Dot and the Smugglers (Australia)
- April 11 - Touch 3: Long After You've Passed Me By (Japan)
- April 15 - God Bless Dancouga (Japan)
- April 20 - G.I. Joe: The Movie (United States)
- April 25 - Wicked City (Japan)
- May 2–3 - Gréti...! (Hungary)
- May 5 - Tteodori Kkachi (South Korea)
- May 9 - Treasure Island (Japan)
- May 15 - Alice Through the Looking Glass (Australia and United States)
- May 21:
  - Circuit Angel: Resolving Starting Grid (Japan)
  - Long Live Servatius (Hungary)
  - Project A-ko 2: Plot of the Daitokuji Financial Group (Japan)
  - The Rose of Versailles: I'll Love You As Long As I Live (Japan)
- May 22 - The Chipmunk Adventure (United States)
- June 10 - Hana no Asuka-gumi! Shin Kabukichō Story (Japan)
- June 12 - The Puppetoon Movie (United States)
- June 19:
  - Black Beauty (Australia)
  - The Brave Little Toaster (United States and United Kingdom)
- June 25 - The Adventures of Lolo the Penguin (Soviet Union and Japan)
- June 28 - Black Magic M-66 (Japan)
- July - 2001 Nights (Japan)
- July 1 - Crystal Triangle (Japan)
- July 5:
  - Rob Roy (Australia)
  - The Wind in the Willows (United States and Taiwan)
- July 9:
  - Dot Goes to Hollywood (Australia)
  - Ico, the Brave Horse (Argentina)
- July 13 - Rock Odyssey (United States)
- July 16 - Monica's Gang In: The Boogeyman (Brazil)
- July 18:
  - Dragon Ball: Sleeping Princess in Devil's Castle (Japan)
  - Saint Seiya: The Movie (Japan)
  - Urusei Yatsura: Inaba the Dreammaker (Japan)
- July 21:
  - Bug tte Honey: Megaromu Shōjo Ma 4622 (Japan)
  - Maps: Legendary Space Wanderers (Japan)
  - Robot Carnival (Japan)
- July 31 - The Last of the Mohicans (Australia)
- August - Zima w dolinie Muminków (Poland)
- August 1:
  - Aitsu to Lullaby: Suiyobi no Cinderella (Japan)
  - Baribari Densetsu (Japan)
  - Phoenix: Yamato Chapter (Japan)
- August 7 - The Care Bears Adventure in Wonderland (Canada)
- August 15 - The Foxes of Chironup Island (Japan)
- September 1 - Lily C.A.T. (Japan)
- September 18 - DuckTales: The Treasure of the Golden Suns (United States)
- September 20 - Yogi's Great Escape (United States)
- September 25:
  - Neo Tokyo (Japan)
  - Persia, the Magic Fairy: Merry-go-round (Japan)
- October 1 - To-y (Japan)
- October 12 - Ultraman: The Adventure Begins (United States and Japan)
- October 18 - Scooby-Doo Meets the Boo Brothers (United States)
- October 19 - The Story of Fifteen Boys (Japan)
- November 1:
  - Devilman: The Birth (Japan)
  - The Samurai (Japan)
- November 2 - Fujiko Fujio no Kiteretsu Daihyakka (Japan)
- November 6:
  - Kaze to Ki no Uta SANCTUS -Sei naru kana- (Japan)
  - Take the X Train (Japan)
- November 15 - The Jetsons Meet the Flintstones (United States)
- November 19 - The Odyssey (Australia)
- November 20:
  - Dreaming of Paradise (Denmark)
  - Margo the Mouse (Poland)
- November 21:
  - Gall Force 2: Destruction (Japan)
  - Twilight of the Cockroaches (Japan)
- November 22 - Yogi Bear and the Magical Flight of the Spruce Goose (United States)
- November 27 - The Little Troll Prince (United States)
- November 28 - Relic Armor Legaciam (Japan)
- December 1:
  - Makyō Gaiden Le Deus (Japan)
  - Scoopers (Japan)
- December 10:
  - Battle Royal High School (Japan)
  - Daimajū Gekitō: Hagane no Oni (Japan)
- December 11 - Gandahar (France)
- December 16:
  - Junk Boy (Japan)
  - Metal Skin Panic MADOX-01 (Japan)
- December 19 - The Tale of Genji (Japan)
- December 21:
  - The Legend of Kentauros (Japan)
  - Phoenix: Space Chapter (Japan)
- December 25:
  - Pinocchio and the Emperor of the Night (United States)
  - Treasure Island (Australia)
- December 26 - Lupin III: The Fuma Conspiracy (Japan)
- December 31 - The Wonderful Wizard of Oz (Canada)
- Specific date unknown:
  - The Amazing Mr. Bickford (United States)
  - Las Aventuras de Oliver Twist (Mexico)
  - Dokgo Tak-ui bidulgi habchang (South Korea)
  - The Emerald City of Oz (Canada)
  - Laughter and Grief by the White Sea (Soviet Union)
  - Leo and Fred (Hungary)
  - The Marvelous Land of Oz (Canada)
  - My Favourite Time (Soviet Union)
  - Ozma of Oz (Canada)
  - El Pequeño Ladronzuelo (Mexico)
  - Robotix: The Movie (United States and Canada)
  - The Snow Queen (Czechoslovakia)

== Television series ==
- January 7:
  - Allsorts debuts on ITV Network (CITV).
  - Creepy Crawlies debuts on ITV Network (CITV).
- January 11 - Little Women debuts on Fuji TV.
- January 14 - Jája a Pája debuts on ČT1, ČT2, and ČT Déčko.
- February 7 - Metal Armor Dragonar debuts on Nagoya Broadcasting Network.
- March 22 - Hiatari Ryōkō! debuts on Fuji TV.
- April - The Shoe People debuts on TV-am, CITV, S4C, and the Children's Channel.
- April 4 - Ultra B debuts on TV Asahi.
- April 6:
  - City Hunter debuts on Yomiuri TV.
  - Kimagure Orange Road debuts on Nippon TV.
- April 7:
  - Esper Mami debuts on TV Asahi.
  - Ox Tales debuts on TV Tokyo.
- April 12 - Zillion debuts on NTV.
- April 19 - Bionic Six debuts on USA Network and in syndication.
- June 3 - Machine Robo: Battle Hackers debuts on TV Tokyo and Cartoon Network Japan.
- June 19 - Edward and Friends debuts on BBC2.
- July 3 - Transformers: The Headmasters debuts on Nippon TV.
- July 5 - Sky Commanders debuts in syndication.
- July 19 - Plonsters debuts on ABC, TV3, RapidKL, YTV, Nickelodeon, TV Cultura, Rai 3, RTÉ, Fuji TV, TV3 Norway and TV Slovenia.
- August 6 - Slippy Dandy debuts in syndication.
- September 7: TigerSharks and The Comic Strip debut in syndication.
- September 12:
  - Fraggle Rock: The Animated Series and The New Archies debut on NBC.
  - My Pet Monster debuts on ABC (United States) and Global (Canada).
- September 13 - Once Upon a Time... Life debuts on FR3, Canal+, CBC/SRC, TVE, KRO, TV SSR, RTBF, BRT & Eiken.
- September 14:
  - BraveStarr and Dinosaucers debut in syndication.
  - Saber Rider and the Star Sheriffs debuts in syndication.
- September 16 - The Pondles debuts on CITV.
- September 18: DuckTales and Sylvanian Families debut in syndication.
- September 19: Hello Kitty's Furry Tale Theater, Mighty Mouse: The New Adventures, and Popeye and Son debut on CBS.
- September 20: Starcom: The US Space Force and Visionaries: Knights of the Magical Light debuts in syndication.
- September 21: Beverly Hills Teens and Spiral Zone debut in syndication.
- September 26:
  - ALF: The Animated Series debuts on NBC.
  - Little Clowns of Happytown and Little Wizards debut on ABC.
- September 30 - The Fruitties debuts on TVE.
- October 4:
  - Norakuro debuts on Fuji TV.
  - Wisdom of the Gnomes debuts on TVE1 (Spain) and ITV (United Kingdom).
- October 7 - Oraa Guzura Dado debuts on Fuji TV.
- October 8 - Mister Ajikko debuts on TV Tokyo.
- October 9 - The Three Musketeers debuts on NHK.
- October 10 - Tsuide ni Tonchinkan debuts on Fuji TV.
- October 11 - Bikkuriman debuts on TV Asahi.
- October 13 - Akakage debuts on Nippon TV.
- October 17 - Ovide and the Gang debuts on Télévision de Radio Canada.
- October 21:
  - Grimm's Fairy Tale Classics debuts on ANN (ABC).
  - Lady Lady debuts on TBS.
- October 27 - Maxie's World debuts in syndication.
- November 17 - Fireman Sam debuts on S4C, BBC 1 (Series 1–4), CBeebies (Series 5), Cartoonito (Series 6-present) and Channel 5 (Series 8-present).
- December 14 - Teenage Mutant Ninja Turtles debuts in syndication (1987–90) and on CBS (1990–96).
- Specific date unknown - Calabash Brothers debuts in syndication.

== Births ==
=== January ===
- January 6: Arin Hanson, American YouTuber and actor (voice of Snaggleback, the Titan, and various other characters in The Owl House, Wesley the Wizard in Bee and Puppycat, Cyborg Photographer in the Rick and Morty episode "The Wedding Squanchers").
- January 12: Naya Rivera, American actress, singer and model (voice of Sparkle in The Naughty List, Catwoman in Batman: The Long Halloween, Lolo Fuentes in the American Dad! episode "The Unincludeds"), (d. 2020).
- January 20: Evan Peters, American actor (voice of Simon in Wish, Clint in the China, IL episode "Magical Pet" ).

=== February ===
- February 5:
  - Adassa, American singer (voice of Dolores Madrigal in Encanto).
  - Darren Criss, American actor and musician (voice of Sideswipe in Transformers: Robots in Disguise, Sutemaru in The Tale of the Princess Kaguya, Katayama in The Wind Rises, Looka in Green Eggs and Ham, Superman in the Tomorrowverse, Raphael in Batman vs. Teenage Mutant Ninja Turtles).
  - Alex Brightman, American actor (voice of Pugsley in Dead End: Paranormal Park, Robo Fizzarolli in Helluva Boss, Sir Pentious and Adam in Hazbin Hotel, Beetlejuice in the Teen Titans Go! episode "Ghost With the Most").
- February 7: Kirby Howell-Baptiste, English actress (voice of Grace Monroe in Infinity Train, Mae Turner in Jurassic World Camp Cretaceous, Cheetah in Catwoman: Hunted, Chelsea in The Powerpuff Girls, Judge Uppinsbottom in the Big City Greens episode "Tilly's Goat", Audrey in the Glitch Techs episode "I'm Mitch Williams", Cobra in the Big Hero 6: The Series episode "Cobra and Mongoose").
- February 9: Michael B. Jordan, American actor (portrayed himself in Space Jam: A New Legacy, voice of Cyborg in Justice League: The Flashpoint Paradox, Julian Chase in Gen:Lock, Killmonger in What If...?, Terence in the Love, Death & Robots episode "Life Hutch", Pretty Boy Flizzy in The Boondocks episode "Pretty Boy Flizzy").
- February 11: Ulysses Cuadra, American actor (voice of Maurice "Twister" Rodriguez in Rocket Power, Vaz in Clifford the Big Red Dog, first voice of Bucky Buenaventura in The Zeta Project).
- February 12: Gary LeRoi Gray, American actor (voice of AJ in The Fairly OddParents, Charley in Clifford the Big Red Dog, Officer Pearce in Batman: The Long Halloween).
- February 21: Elliot Page, Canadian actor (voice of Alaska Nebraska in The Simpsons episode "Waverly Hills, 9-0-2-1-D'oh", Lindsey in the Family Guy episode "Tom Tucker: The Man and his Dream", Robot Assistant in the Glenn Martin, DDS episode "Date with Destiny").
- February 24: Tina Desai, Indian actress (voice of Ashima in Thomas & Friends).

=== March ===
- March 7: Erika Ishii, American actor (voice of Ludsev in Shamon King, Mary Marvel in Young Justice, Jenna and Liv in Oddballs, Doctor Light and Huntress in Justice League: Crisis on Infinite Earths, JunJun in Sailor Moon, Turbo in the Moon Girl and Devil Dinosaur episode "Family Matters", Harley in Zombies: The Re-Animated Series, Lady Deathstrike in the X-Men '97 episode "Weapon X, Lies and DVDS").
- March 13: Owen Dennis, American animator and television writer and producer (Regular Show, Close Enough, creator of and voice of One-One in Infinity Train).
- March 17: Lee Ae-jung, Korean voice actress (dub voice of Chaca in The Emperor's New Groove), (d. 2007).
- March 22: Billy Kametz, American voice actor (voice of Josuke Higashikata in JoJo's Bizarre Adventure, Anai in Aggretsuko, Naofumi Iwatani in The Rising of the Shield Hero, Mikhail in Sirius the Jaeger, White Blood Cell in Cells at Work!, Ren and Ash's Rotom Phone in Pokémon Journeys: The Series, Shigeru Aoba in Neon Genesis Evangelion, Nevareth in The Owl House episode "Witches Before Wizards"), (d. 2022).

=== April ===
- April 3: Rachel Bloom, American actress (voice of Barb in Trolls World Tour, Silver in The Angry Birds Movie 2, Batgirl in Batman vs. Teenage Mutant Ninja Turtles, Autumn Blaze in the My Little Pony: Friendship Is Magic episode "Sounds of Silence").
- April 4: Sarah Gadon, Canadian actress (voice of Alyssa in My Dad the Rock Star, Jodie in Time Warp Trio, the title character in Ruby Gloom, Beth in the Total Drama franchise).
- April 9: Jesse McCartney, American actor and singer (voice of Terence in the Disney Fairies franchise, JoJo McDodd in Horton Hears a Who!, Dick Grayson in Young Justice, Dreambot in the Chibiverse episode "Mabel's Dream Date").
- April 12: Ilana Glazer, American stand-up comedian, actor, writer, producer, director, and activist (voice of EB in Green Eggs and Ham, Penny Carson in BoJack Horseman, Sister Sister in the Lucas Bros Moving Co episode "Sister Sister Sister").
- April 19: Courtland Mead, American actor (voice of Ned Needlemeyer in Nightmare Ned, Gus in Recess, Lloyd in Lloyd in Space).
- April 27: Emma Taylor-Isherwood, Canadian actress (voice of the title character in Mona the Vampire, Penny Grant in The Kids from Room 402, Angel in Kuu Kuu Harajuku).

=== May ===
- May 7: Maya Erskine, American actress (voice of Cafeteria Girl Misha in Big Mouth, Judy Takamoto in Scoob!, Mercy Graves in DC League of Super-Pets).
- May 13: Hunter Parrish, American actor and singer (voice of Kid Flash and Geo-Force in the Batman: The Brave and the Bold episode "Requiem for a Scarlet Speedster!", Tundra in the Pound Puppies episode "Snow Problem").
- May 20: Ray Chase, American actor (voice of Bruno Buccellatti in JoJo's Bizarre Adventure: Golden Wind, Tengen Uzui in Demon Slayer: Kimetsu no Yaiba, Donquixote Rocinante in One Piece, Eren Kruger in Attack on Titan, Gendou Ikari in the Netflix dub of Neon Genesis Evangelion, Professor Cerise in Pokémon Journeys: The Series, Yuu Otosaka in Charlotte, Zash Caine in Fairy Tail, Bel in Glitter Force Doki Doki, Jason Blood / Etrigan in the DC Animated Movie Universe).
- May 22: Takuya Eguchi, Japanese voice actor and singer (voice of Kazuya Kujo in Gosick, Yoshiharu Sagara in The Ambition of Oda Nobuna, Kon Hokaze in Ixion Saga DT, Hachiman Hikigaya in My Youth Romantic Comedy Is Wrong, As I Expected, William Twining in Devils and Realist, Yuuji Terushima in Haikyuu!!, Takeo Gōda in My Love Story, Loid Forger in Spy × Family).
- May 28: Mai Fuchigami, Japanese voice actress and singer (voice of Iona/I-401 in Arpeggio of Blue Steel, Alice Yotsuba/Cure Rosetta in DokiDoki! PreCure, Nagisa Shiota in Assassination Classroom, Miho Nishizumi inGirls und Panzer, Karen Hojo in The Idolmaster Cinderella Girls).
- May 31: Shaun Fleming, American musician and actor (voice of Keoni Jameson in Lilo & Stitch: The Series, Leonard Helperman in Teacher's Pet, young Max Goof in Mickey's Once Upon a Christmas and Mickey's Twice Upon a Christmas, first voice of Jim and Tim Possible in Kim Possible).

=== June ===
- June 11:
  - Jimmy O. Yang, Chinese-American actor (voice of Zebe in The Lego Movie 2: The Second Part, Joey Raccoon in We Bare Bears: The Movie, Zhi in Rally Road Racers, the title character in The Monkey King, Short Goon in Wish Dragon, Flight Specialist Jung and Jeff in Beavis and Butt-Head Do the Universe, Henchman #1 in Minions: The Rise of Gru, Sun Tzu in The Simpsons episode "No Good Read Goes Unpunished").
  - Olan Rogers, American actor, comedian, filmmaker, and YouTuber (creator of and voice of Gary Goodspeed and Mooncake in Final Space).
- June 22: Xanthe Huynh, American voice actress (voice of Alluka Zoldyck in Hunter x Hunter, Haru Okumura in Persona 5: The Animation, Meiko Honma in Anohana, Ui Hirasawa in K-On!, Suzuka Tsukimura in Magical Girl Lyrical Nanoha, Fei Wu / Renren in the Miraculous: Tales of Ladybug & Cat Noir episode "Miraculous World: Shanghai – The Legend of Ladydragon").

=== July ===
- July 7: Steven Crowder, Canadian-American political commentator and former actor (voice of Mung in Sagwa, the Chinese Siamese Cat, second voice of Alan Powers / The Brain in Arthur).
- July 9: Rebecca Sugar, American animator, director, screenwriter (Adventure Time), producer, and singer-songwriter (creator of Steven Universe).
- July 11:
  - Cristina Vee, American actress (voice of Marinette Dupain-Cheng / Ladybug in Miraculous: Tales of Ladybug & Cat Noir, Sailor Mars in the Viz Media dub of Sailor Moon, Homura Akemi in Puella Magi Madoka Magica, Hawk in The Seven Deadly Sins, Xochi in Victor and Valentino).
  - A.J. LoCascio, American actor and director (voice of Prince Lotor in Voltron: Legendary Defender, Gizmo in Gremlins, Gambit in X-Men '97).
- July 16: Kira Buckland, American actress (voice of Kuroyukihime in Accel World, Reimi in JoJo's Bizarre Adventure, Mary Saotome in Kakegurui, Alix Kubdel / Bunnyx in Miraculous: Tales of Ladybug & Cat Noir).
- July 24: Mara Wilson, American actress (voice of Jill Pill in BoJack Horseman, Liv Amara in Big Hero 6: The Series, Tamara Caulder in the Batman Beyond episode "Mind Games").
- July 27: Genesis Rodriguez, American actress and model (voice of Honey Lemon in Big Hero 6 and Big Hero 6: The Series, Perfuma in She-Ra and the Princesses of Power).

=== August ===
- August 4: Karla Sakas Shropshire, American television writer (The Loud House).
- August 5: Adrian Petriw, Canadian actor (voice of Iron Man in Iron Man: Armored Adventures, Gren in The Dragon Prince, Scott in Ninjago, Ken in the Barbie franchise).
- August 16:
  - Eri Kitamura, Japanese actress (voice of Miki Aono / Cure Berry in Fresh Pretty Cure!, Sayaka Miki in Puella Magi Madoka Magica, Shizuku in New Game!, Darjeeling in Girls und Panzer, Ranko Honjō in My First Girlfriend Is a Gal, Kirika Ueno in C3, Roxie and Bea in Pokémon, Yuka Mochida in Corpse Party, Uni/Black Sister in Hyperdimension Neptunia).
  - Okieriete Onaodowan, American actor (voice of Mr. Gold in Jurassic World Camp Cretaceous, Mike in the BoJack Horseman episode "The Kidney Stays in the Picture").
- August 19: Manny Jacinto, Philippine-born Canadian actor (voice of Scott Denoga in Hailey's On It!, Kenshi in Mortal Kombat Legends: Snow Blind, Coffee Dude in Magical Girl Friendship Squad, Maliski in Trese).
- August 21: Kelsey Mulrooney, American actress (voice of Female Ants in A Bug's Life), (d. 2021).
- August 31: Alexis Ortega, Mexican voice actor (Latin American voice of Spider-Man in Spider-Man, Guardians of the Galaxy and Marvel Super Hero Adventures, Tadashi Hamada in Big Hero 6 and Big Hero 6: The Series, Ryan "Inside" Laney in Cars 3, Jack in Goldie & Bear), (d. 2026).

=== September ===
- September 3: Megan Amram, American writer, producer and performer (The Simpsons).
- September 7: Evan Rachel Wood, American actress (voice of Mala in Battle for Terra, Marianne in Strange Magic, Queen Iduna in Frozen II).
- September 8: Wiz Khalifa, American rapper, singer and songwriter (voice of Mr. Mitch in Duncanville, Mateo in the American Dad! episode "Bahama Mama", Frilled Lizard in the Big City Greens episode "Rembo").
- September 10: Amanda C. Miller, German-born American actress (voice of Jo in Kid Cosmic, Sailor Jupiter in the Viz Media dub of the Sailor Moon franchise, Boruto Uzumaki in Boruto: Naruto Next Generations).
- September 11: Elizabeth Henstridge, English actress (voice of Argelbleccht Blunkthorthph in Penn Zero: Part-Time Hero, Jemma Simmons in the Ultimate Spider-Man episode "Lizards").
- September 13: Ai Kayano, Japanese voice actress (voice of Meiko Honma in Anohana: The Flower We Saw That Day, Inori Yuzuhira in Guilty Crown, Amane Kasai / Cure Finale in Delicious Party Pretty Cure, Alice Zuberg in Sword Art Online, Utaha Kasumigaoka in Saekano: How to Raise a Boring Girlfriend, Itsuwa in A Certain Magical Index, Mashiro Shiina in The Pet Girl of Sakurasou, Saori Takebe in Girls und Panzer, Shiro in No Game No Life, Darkness in KonoSuba, Mamako Oosuki in Do You Love Your Mom and Her Two-Hit Multi-Target Attacks?).
- September 18: Jinkx Monsoon, American drag queen, actor, comedian and singer (voice of Jenna in Bravest Warriors, Emerald in the Steven Universe episode "Lars of the Stars", Hairmosa in the Mighty Magiswords episode "To Balderly Go", Martha in Helluva Boss).
- September 20: Sarah Natochenny, American voice actress (continued voice of Ash Ketchum in Pokémon).
- September 23: Skylar Astin, American actor (voice of Branch in Trolls: The Beat Goes On! and Trolls: TrollsTopia, Roy in Wreck-It Ralph, Frankenstein in the Vampirina episode "Franken-Wedding").

=== October ===
- October 8: Aya Hirano, Japanese actress (voice of the title character in Haruhi Suzumiya, Konata Izumi in Lucky Star, Garnet, Komachi Saotome, and Midori Akagi in the Jewelpet franchise, Misa Amane in Death Note, Lucy Heartfilia in Fairy Tail, Dende in Dragon Ball Super).
- October 9: Melissa Villaseñor, American actress and comedian (voice of Millie in Max & the Midknights, Ally in Amphibia, Taffyta Muttonfudge in Ralph Breaks the Internet, Karen Beverly in Toy Story 4, various characters in OK K.O.! Let's Be Heroes, Pencil in Rock Paper Scissors, Nellie Ramirez Humphrey in Primos).
- October 12: Luke Pearson, British illustrator, cartoonist, screenwriter, storyboard artist (Adventure Time) and comic book artist (creator of Hilda).
- October 14: Jay Pharoah, American actor (voice of Noah in The Mitchells vs. the Machines, Meena's grandfather in Sing, Montrel and Randy in Legends of Chamberlain Heights, Man on the Street and Dashawn Manheim in BoJack Horseman, Drederick Tatum in The Simpsons, Skee-Lo, Kanye West, Kanye Canes and Brick Baker in Family Guy, Barack Obama in the Robot Chicken episode "May Cause Your Dad to Come Back With That Gallon of Milk He Went Out for 10 Years Ago").
- October 15: Chantal Strand, Canadian actress (voice of Diamond Tiara in My Little Pony: Friendship Is Magic, Bijou in Hamtaro, Cassie in Dragon Tales, Lacus Clyne in Mobile Suit Gundam SEED, Wolfsbane in X-Men: Evolution).
- October 18:
  - Zac Efron, American actor (voice of Ted Wiggins in The Lorax, Fred Jones in Scoob!, Davey Hunkerhoff in The Replacements episode "Davey Hunkerhoff").
  - Quinn Beswick, American actor (voice of Charlie Brown in It's the Pied Piper, Charlie Brown, Slightly in Return to Never Land).
- October 23: Jonathan Malen, Canadian actor (voice of Jimmy Z in Wild Kratts, Danny in PAW Patrol).

=== November ===
- November 1: Jamie Demetriou, English comedian, actor and screenwriter (voice of Moriarty in Sherlock Gnomes, Fingers in Dead End: Paranormal Park, Dr. McPhee in Night at the Museum: Kahmunrah Rises Again, Chester in Strays).
- November 7: Reba Buhr, American actress (voice of Katie Forester in season 3 of Yo-Kai Watch, Bobbie Blobby in Power Players, second voice of Rose Lavillant and Juleka Couffaine in Miraculous: Tales of Ladybug & Cat Noir).
- November 21: Aimee-Ffion Edwards, Welsh actress (voice of Havoc in Thunderbirds are Go, Arabella, Big Fee, and Summer in 101 Dalmatian Street).
- November 28: Karen Gillan, Scottish actress (voice of Nebula in What If...?, Eyes in Spies in Disguise, Maise MacWeldon in The Simpsons episode "Ae Bonny Romance").

=== December ===
- December 4:
  - Orlando Brown, American actor (voice of Damey Wayne in Waynehead, Bear and Little Boy in The Tangerine Bear, Sticky Webb in The Proud Family, Cornelius Fillmore in Fillmore!, Evan Thomas Taylor in Clifford's Puppy Days).
  - Miho Arakawa, Japanese voice actress (voice of Himari Takakura in Penguindrum, Shizuku and Elisa in Hunter × Hunter, Tsunomi Kabutohara in Wizard Barristers, Sumireko Hanabusa in Riddle Story of Devil, Naruko Aoba in Magica Wars, Sonia Nevermind in Danganronpa).
- December 6: Jack DeSena, American actor (voice of Sokka in Avatar: The Last Airbender, the title character in Monkie Kid, Callum in The Dragon Prince, Lance in the Generator Rex episode "Crash & Burn", Jimmy Olsen in The Batman episode "The Batman/Superman Story").
- December 7: Aaron Carter, American singer and songwriter (voice of Joseph Plumb Martin in Liberty's Kids, Clutch Koerner in the Rocket Power episode "Legends and Their Falls"), (d. 2022).
- December 8: Aria Curzon, American actress (voice of Pebbles Flintstone in Cave Kids, Joanie in Nightmare Ned, Emily in Annabelle's Wish, Theresa LaMaise in Recess, Little Ape in Tarzan, Ben in Stanley, Bitsy in Lloyd in Space, Lucy Lane in the Superman: The Animated Series episode "Monkey Fun", third voice of Ducky in The Land Before Time franchise, additional voices in An All Dogs Christmas Carol, The Rugrats Movie, The Prince of Egypt and 101 Dalmatians II: Patch's London Adventure).
- December 16: Hisako Kanemoto, Japanese voice actress and singer (voice of Amy in Gargantia on the Verdurous Planet, the title character in Squid Girl, Sailor Mercury in Sailor Moon Crystal, Atra Mixta in Mobile Suit Gundam: Iron-Blooded Orphans, Yayoi Kise/Cure Peace in Smile PreCure!, Karen Tendou in Gamers!, Ginko Sora in The Ryuo's Work Is Never Done!, Erina Nakiri in Food Wars!: Shokugeki no Soma, Tsugumi Hazawa in BanG Dream!, Aoi Hinami in Bottom-tier Character Tomozaki).
- December 17: Jonathan Langdon, Canadian actor (voice of Boog in Open Season: Call of Nature, Barney in Barney's World).
- December 28: Thomas Dekker, American actor (voice of Fievel in the An American Tail franchise, young Valmont in Jackie Chan Adventures, second voice of Littlefoot in The Land Before Time franchise).

== Deaths ==
=== January ===
- January 26: Charles Wolcott, American composer (Walt Disney Company), dies at age 80.
- January 27: Norman McLaren, Scottish-Canadian animator, film director and producer (Neighbours, Rythmetic, Blinkity Blank, Pas de deux), dies at age 72.
- January 31: Julian Antonisz, Polish film director (Sun: A Non-Camera Film 1977, aka Słońce - film bez kamery), dies at age 45.

=== February ===
- February 21: George Tibbles, American composer and screenwriter (co-wrote The Woody Woodpecker Song), dies at age 73.

=== March ===
- March 3: Danny Kaye, American actor, comedian, and singer (voice of Seymour S. Sassafras, Colonel Wellington B. Bunny and Antoine in Here Comes Peter Cottontail, Marmaduke in The Enchanted World of Danny Kaye), dies at age 76.
- March 22: Ib Steinaa, Danish comics artist and animator (Robinson Columbus), dies at age 60.
- March 25: Ivan Ivanov-Vano, Russian animation director, animator, screenwriter, and professor in a film school, (Black and White, Moidodyr, The Humpbacked Horse, The Snow Maiden, The Twelve Months, The Adventures of Buratino, Lefty, Go There, Don't Know Where, The Battle of Kerzhenets, The Humpbacked Horse, The Tale of Tsar Saltan), dies at age 87.

=== April ===
- April 1: Vladimir Popov, Russian animator, film director and art director (Three from Prostokvashino), dies at age 56.
- April 17: Dick Shawn, American actor and comedian (voice of Snow Miser in The Year Without a Santa Claus), dies at age 63.
- April 19: Milt Kahl, American animator (one of Disney's Nine Old Men), dies at age 78.

=== May ===
- May 3: Dick Kelsey, American film director and theme park designer (Walt Disney Company), dies at age 82.
- May 24: Hermione Gingold, English actress (voice of Mme. Rubens-Chatte in Gay Purr-ee, Miss Squeek in Tubby the Tuba), dies at age 89.

=== June ===
- June 1: Jef Cassiers, Belgian actor, comedian, animator and film director (Jan Zonder Vrees (John the Fearless)), dies at age 57.
- June 10: Elizabeth Hartman, American actress (voice of Mrs. Brisby in The Secret of NIMH), commits suicide at age 43.
- June 13: Geraldine Page, American actress (voice of Madame Medusa in The Rescuers), dies at age 62.
- June 22: Fred Astaire, American actor and singer (voice of S.D. Kluger in Santa Claus Is Comin' to Town and The Easter Bunny Is Comin' to Town), dies at age 88.
- June 28: Lev Milchin, Russian film director and illustrator (The Tale of Tsar Saltan), dies at age 66.

=== July ===
- July 1: Jerry Livingston, American songwriter (theme songs of The Bugs Bunny Show and Casper the Friendly Ghost, co-writer of "Bibbidi-Bobbidi-Boo" in Cinderella), dies at age 78.
- July 22: Jack Lescoulie, American actor (voice of Casper Caveman in Daffy Duck and the Dinosaur, Jack Bunny in Slap-Happy Pappy and Goofy Groceries), dies at age 74.
- July 26: Kenneth Muse, American animator (Walt Disney Company, MGM, Hanna-Barbera), dies at age 77.

=== August ===
- August 28: John Huston, American filmmaker and actor (voice of Gandalf in The Hobbit and The Return of the King, narrator in Epic and The Black Cauldron), dies at age 81.

=== September ===
- September 22: Carman Maxwell, American animator, production manager and actor (Laugh-O-Gram Studio, Walt Disney Animation Studios, Warner Bros. Cartoons, Metro-Goldwyn-Mayer cartoon studio, animated Oswald the Lucky Rabbit, voiced Bosko), dies at age 84.

=== November ===
- November 11: John N. Carey, American animator and comics artist (Warner Bros. Cartoons), dies at age 72.
- November 10: Jackie Vernon, American comedian (voice of the title character in Frosty the Snowman) dies at age 63.
- November 19: Ben Clopton, American animator and animation director, directed early films of Oswald the Lucky Rabbit (Walt Disney Company, Harman-Ising, Ub Iwerks, Walter Lantz, Fleischer Studios), dies at age 81.

=== December ===
- December 13: Claude T. Smith, American composer (John Henry and the Inky-Poo), dies at age 55.
- December 22: José do Patrocínio Oliveira, Brazilian singer, musician and actor (voice of José Carioca in Saludos Amigos and The Three Caballeros), dies at age 83.
- December 24: Betty Noyes, American actress and singer (sang "Baby Mine" in Dumbo, voice of Lady Fish in The Incredible Mr. Limpet), dies at age 75.

=== Specific date unknown ===
- Lenn Redman, American caricaturist, animator, novelist, poet, illustrator, comics artist, cartoonist and activist (Warner Bros. Cartoons, Walt Disney Company, Filmation, Hanna-Barbera), dies at age 74 or 75.

== See also ==
- 1987 in anime
