= 1987 in anime =

The events of 1987 in anime.

== Releases ==
| Released | Title | Type | Director | Studio | Ref |
|---|---|---|---|---|---|
| January 11 | Little Women | TV series | Fumio Kurokawa | Nippon Animation | |
| January 18 | New Maple Town Stories: Palm Town Chapter | TV series | Hiroshi Shidara, Junichi Sato | Toei Animation | |
| January 21 | Magical Princess Minky Momo Hitomi no Seiza Minky Momo SONG Special | OVA | | Ashi Productions | |
| January 21 | Urotsukidōji | OVA series | Hideki Takayama | West Cape, Team Mu | |
| January 28 | Campus Special Investigator Hikaruon | OVA film | Kazuhiro Ochi | AIC | |
| February 7 | Metal Armor Dragonar | TV series | Takeyuki Kanda | Sunrise | |
| February 25 | Bubblegum Crisis | OVA series | Katsuhito Akiyama, Masami Ōbari, Hiroaki Gōda | AIC, Artmic | |
| February 28 | Twilight Q | OVA series | Tomomi Mochizuki, Mamoru Oshii | Ajia-do Animation Works, Studio Deen | |
| March 13 | Hokuto no Ken 2 | TV series | Toyoo Ashida | Toei Animation | |
| March 14 | Doraemon: Nobita and the Knights on Dinosaurs | Film | Tsutomu Shibayama | Shin-Ei Animation | |
| March 14 | Bats & Terry | Film | Nobuo Mizuta | Sunrise | |
| March 14 | New Maple Town Stories: Home Town Collection | Film | Hiroshi Shidara | Toei Animation | |
| March 14 | Royal Space Force: The Wings of Honnêamise | Film | Hiroyuki Yamaga | Gainax | |
| March 21 | New Cream Lemon | OVA series | | | |
| March 21 | Laughing Target | OVA film | Motosuke Takahashi | Studio Pierrot | |
| March 22 | Hiatari Ryōkō! | TV series | Gisaburō Sugii | Group TAC | |
| March 27 | Digital Devil Story: Megami Tensei | OVA film | Mizuho Nishikubo | | |
| March 27 | Minna Agechau | Short film | Osamu Uemura | Animate, J.C.Staff | |
| April 4 | Hoero! Bun Bun | Film | Toshio Hirata | Madhouse | |
| April 6 | City Hunter | TV series | Kenji Kodama | Sunrise | |
| April 6 | Kimagure Orange Road | TV series | Osamu Kobayashi | Studio Pierrot | |
| April 7 | Esper Mami | TV series | Keiichi Hara | Shin-Ei Animation | |
| April 7 | Ox Tales | TV series | Hiroshi Sasagawa | Studio Cosmos, Telecable Benelux B.V. | |
| April 11 | Touch 3: Kimi ga Tōri Sugita Ato ni | Film | Akinori Takaoka | Group TAC | |
| April 12 | Zillion | TV series | Akira Watanabe | Tatsunoko, Production I.G | |
| April 15 | God Bless Dancouga | OVA | | Ashi Productions | |
| April 25 | Wicked City | Film | Yoshiaki Kawajiri | Madhouse | |
| May 21 | Project A-ko 2: Plot of the Daitokuji Financial Group | OVA | Yuji Moriyama | Studio A.P.P.P. | |
| May 21 | Yōtōden | OVA series | Osamu Yamazaki | J.C.Staff | |
| June 3 | Machine Robo: Battle Hackers | TV series | | Ashi Productions | |
| June 12 | Shin Kabukicho Story Hana no Asuka-gumi! | OVA | | | |
| June 21 | Space Fantasia 2001 Nights | OVA film | Yoshio Takeuchi | TMS Entertainment | |
| June 21 | The Super Dimension Fortress Macross: Flash Back 2012 | OVA | Shoji Kawamori | Studio Nue, Artland, Tatsunoko Production | |
| June 28 | Black Magic M-66 | OVA film | Hiroyuki Kitakubo, Masamune Shirow | AIC | |
| July 3 | Transformers: The Headmasters | TV series | Katsutoshi Sasaki, Shoji Tajima | Toei Animation | |
| July 14 | Maps: Densetsu no Samayoeru Seijintachi | Film | Keiji Hayakawa | Studio Gallop | |
| July 18 | Dragon Ball: Sleeping Princess in Devil's Castle | Film | Daisuke Nishio | Toei Animation | |
| July 18 | Inaba the Dreammaker | OVA film | | Studio Deen | |
| July 18 | Saint Seiya: The Movie | Film | Kōzō Morishita | Toei Animation | |
| July 21 | Robot Carnival | Film | Atsuko Fukushima et al. | Studio APPP | |
| July 22 | Crystal Triangle | OVA film | Seiji Okuda | Studio APPP | |
| August 1 | Yamato / Space | OVA series | Toshio Hirata, Yoshiaki Kawajiri | Madhouse, Tezuka Productions | |
| August 25 | Legend of Lemnear | OVA film | Kinji Yoshimoto | AIC | |
| September 1 | Lily C.A.T. | OVA film | Hisayuki Toriumi | Studio Pierrot | |
| September 25 | Neo Tokyo | Film | Rintarō, Yoshiaki Kawajiri, Katsuhiro Ōtomo | Madhouse | |
| September 25 | Persia, the Magic Fairy: Merry-go-Round | OVA | | Studio Pierrot | |
| September 28 | Dangaioh | OVA series | Toshiki Hirano | AIC, Artmic | |
| October 1 | To-y | OVA film | Mamoru Hamatsu | Studio Gallop | |
| October 7 | Oraa Guzura Dado | TV series | Hiroshi Sasagawa | Tatsunoko Productions | |
| October 8 | Mister Ajikko | TV series | Yasuhiro Imagawa | Sunrise | |
| October 9 | The Three Musketeers Anime | TV series | Kunihiko Yuyama | Studio Gallop | |
| October 10 | Tsuide ni Tonchinkan | TV series | Shin Misawa, Tomomasa Yamazaki | Studio Comet | |
| October 11 | Bikkuriman | TV series | Mitsuru Aoyama | Toei Animation | |
| October 7 | Oraa Guzura Dado | TV series | Hiroshi Sasagawa | Tatsunoko Productions | |
| October 12 | Ultraman: The Adventure Begins | Film | Mitsuo Kusakabe | Madhouse | |
| October 13 | Akakage | TV series | Susumu Ishizaki | Toei Animation | |
| October 21 | Grimm Masterpiece Theater | TV series | Hiroshi Saito | Nippon Animation | |
| October 21 | Lady Lady!! | TV series | Hiroshi Shidara | Toei Animation | |
| November 1 | Devilman Tanjo Hen | OVA film | Tsutomu Iida | Oh! Production | |
| November 6 | The Song of Wind and Trees: Sanctus | OVA film | Yoshikazu Yasuhiko | | |
| November 21 | Destruction | Film | Katsuhito Akiyama | AIC, Artmic | |
| November 21 | Twilight of the Cockroaches | Film | Hiroaki Yoshida | Madhouse | |
| December 10 | Battle Royal High School | OVA film | Ichirō Itano | DAST, Tokuma Shoten | |
| December 10 | Daimajū Gekitō: Hagane no Oni | OVA film | Toshihiro Hirano | AIC | |
| December 21 | Original Dirty Pair | OVA series | Masayoshi Tanidabe | Sunrise | |
| December | The Plot of the Fuma Clan | OVA film | Masayuki Ōzeki | TMS Entertainment | |

== See also ==
- 1987 in animation
