= Niwatori =

Niwatori may refer to:

- Niwa ni wa Niwa Niwatori ga ita, a one-shot manga by Tatsuki Fujimoto
- Niwatori Otoko to Akaikubi, a segment of the Anime anthology Robot Carnival
- Niwatori:_13_Japanese_Birds_Pt._10, an album by Merzbow
