= Takehiro Murozono =

Japanese voice actor

- 室園 丈裕
- Born: August 3, 1969 (age 57); Kanagawa, Japan
- Occupation: Voice actor
- Years active: 1992–present

Takehiro Murozono (室園 丈裕, Murozono Takehiro; born August 3, 1969 in Kanagawa) is a Japanese voice actor who works for Office Kaoru.

== Filmography ==
- Beyblade G-Revolution, Rick
- Bubblegum Crisis 2040, Kuzui
- Divergence Eve, Morozov
- Dokyusei 2, Yoshiki Nagaoka
- El-Hazard, Katsuo
- Full Metal Panic!, Arbalest
- Gensomaden Saiyuki, Fake Hakkai (eps 10, 32)
- Fullmetal Alchemist, Vato Falman
- Ghost Stories, Reiichiro Miyanoshita
- Jikuu Tenshou Nazca, Takuma Dan
- Nightmare Campus, Akira Mido
- Demon Beast Resurrection, Muneto
- Macross 7, Michael
- Magical Girl Pretty Sammy, Shigeki Amano
- Sins of the Flesh, Adolpho
- Monster, Junkers
- Onmyou Taisenki, Shoukaku
- Sci-fi Harry, Catherine's Father
- Legend of the Blue Wolves, Subordinate
- Urotsukidoji: New saga, Narrator; Doctor
- Tenchi in Tokyo, Umanosuke Tsuchida
- Tokimeki Memorial 2, Sakunoshin Mihara
- Twelve Kingdoms, Kakugo
- Digimon Savers, Duftmon
- Rave Master, Let
- Bokurano: Ours, Tamotsu Sakakibara
- Sexy Sailor Soldiers, Monster
- You're Under Arrest (manga), Delinquent, Erihito Akamoto, Kazu, Male Officer, Police Executive, Yoshida, Young Man, Oldman, Dracula & Nobuyuki Sugihara

=== Tokusatsu ===
- Tetsuwan Tantei Robotack, Kabados
- Zyuden Sentai Kyoryuger, Debo Akidamonne (ep. 33)
- Zyuden Sentai Kyoryuger Returns: Hundred Years After, Debo Akidamonne
- Kaitou Sentai Lupinranger VS Keisatsu Sentai Patranger, Dugon Manattee (ep. 40)

=== Dubbing ===
- American Reunion, Chris "Oz" Ostreicher (Chris Klein)
- Autumn in My Heart, Yoon Joon-suh (Song Seung-heon)
- The Fan, Juan Primo (Benicio del Toro)
- FBI: Most Wanted, Clinton Skye (Nathaniel Arcand)
- I Know What You Did Last Summer, Ray Bronson (Freddie Prinze Jr.)
- I Know What You Did Last Summer (2025), Ray Bronson (Freddie Prinze Jr.)
- A Knight's Tale, William Thatcher (Heath Ledger)
- Monrak Transistor, Siew (Ampon Rattanawong)
