= Roujin Z =

1991 Japanese animated film

- Japanese theatrical release poster
- Directed by: Hiroyuki Kitakubo
- Written by: Katsuhiro Otomo
- Produced by: Yasuhito Nomura; Yasuku Kazama; Yoshiaki Motoya
- Cinematography: Hideo Okazaki
- Edited by: Eiko Nishide
- Music by: Bun Itakura
- Production companies: The Television Inc.; Movic Co; TV Asahi; Sony Music Entertainment Japan; A.P.P.P.
- Distributed by: Tokyo Theaters Co.
- Release date: September 14, 1991 (Japan)
- Running time: 84 minutes
- Country: Japan
- Language: Japanese

Roujin Z (Japanese: 老人Z, Hepburn: Rōjin Zetto; lit. 'Old Man Z') is a 1991 Japanese anime science fiction action thriller film directed by Hiroyuki Kitakubo and written by Katsuhiro Otomo. The animation for Roujin Z was produced by A.P.P.P..

== Plot ==
Roujin Z is set in early 21st-century Japan. A group of scientists and hospital administrators, under the direction of the Ministry of Public Welfare and led by lead programmer Mr. Hasegawa, have developed the Z-001: a computerized hospital bed with robotic features. The Z-001 takes complete care of the patient: it can dispense food and medicine, remove excretory waste, bathe and exercise the patient lying within its frame. The bed is driven by its own built-in nuclear power reactor—and in the event of an atomic meltdown, the bed (including the patient lying within) would become automatically sealed in concrete.

The first patient to be "volunteered" to test the bed is an 87-year-old dying widower named Kijuro Takazawa. He is an invalid who is cared for by a young nursing student named Haruko. The electronic elements within the Z-001 somehow manage to transcribe Takazawa's thoughts through Haruko's office computer, and he uses the communication to cry for help. Although she objects to such treatment of elderly patients, Haruko begrudgingly seeks the aid of a group of computer hackers in the hospital's geriatric ward to create and install a vocal simulation of Takazawa's deceased wife Haru in the Z-001. However, once Takazawa wishes to go to the beach near Kamakura to relive his happier times with Haru, the Z-001 detaches itself from its moorings and escapes from the hospital with the man in its grasp. Haruko's fears are then justified, as it is discovered that the bed is actually a government-designed, experimental weapons robot.

Once the Ministry learns of the bed's escape, their field representative Mr. Terada and Mr. Hasegawa decide to give chase in the latter's corporate helicopter, only for Haruko to force her way in as it takes off. The bed incorporates multiple machines, including cars and excavators, into itself while using Haru's voice to argue with Terada, agreeing to return to the hospital as it rampages into the last tunnel on the road to the beach. Hasegawa and Terada argue upon landing, while Haruko and the elderly hackers (working via radio link) successfully persuade the bed to release Takazawa. The bed, however, continues its rampage. Hasegawa then reveals a more advanced prototype of the Z-001, commanding it to subdue the bed while he prepares a cybernetic ambulance to take Takazawa to the hospital, only for the ambulance to malfunction with Takazawa inside.

Terada works to disconnect and smash the bed's peripherals and safely escort Takazawa onto the beach, while the hackers are able to program the Haru simulacrum to help Haruko destroy the bed's chip core by blowing up an oxygen tank. In her dying moments, the Haru simulacrum promises a despondent Takazawa she will see him again. They watch the sunset, while unbeknownst to everyone, a cat runs off with the chip core's remnants.

In the epilogue, Hasegawa is arrested and Terada says the Ministry will not comment until the trial (though he notes documents on the bed and ambulance have been leaked, implied to be Haruko's doing). The reassembled bed makes a surprise visit to the hospital, this time much larger (with the large Kamakura Buddha incorporated in her upper body) and as willing as ever to take Takazawa to the beach, much to his delight.

== Cast ==
Role	Japanese	English
Role	Japanese	World Wide Group (1994)
Haruko Mihashi (三橋晴子)	Chisa Yokoyama	Toni Barry
Takashi Terada (寺田卓)	Shinji Ogawa	Allan Wenger
Nobuko Ooe (大江信子)	Chie Satou	Barbara Barnes
Mitsuru Maeda (前田満)	Kouji Tsujitani	Adam Henderson
Kijuurou Takazawa (高沢喜十郎)	Hikojirou Matsumura	Ian Thompson
Yoshihiko Hasegawa (長谷川良彦)	Shinsuke Chikaishi	John Fitzgerald Jay
Haru Takazawa (高沢ハル)	Masa Saitou	Nicolette McKenzie
Tomoe Satou (佐藤知枝)	Rika Matsumoto	Jana Carpenter
Old Man A (老人A)	Ryuuji Saikachi	Seán Barrett
Old Man B (老人B)	Hikojirou Matsumura	Blain Fairman
Old Man C (老人C)	Takeshi Aono	Nigel Anthony

== Themes ==
In his review of Roujin Z, Tony Rayns stated the film focuses on three primary issues: health care for the elderly, the stand-off between traditional values and modern technology and the Right's covert plans to re-militarise Japan.

== Production ==
The animation for Roujin Z was produced by A.P.P.P. in association with other companies including Movic, Sony Music Entertainment Japan, Aniplex and TV Asahi. The film was directed by Hiroyuki Kitakubo, who previously directed the "A Tale of Two Robots" segment in the APPP anthology film Robot Carnival. Katsuhiro Otomo provided the film's story and screenplay. The characters were designed by Hisashi Eguchi, the manga artist known for Stop!! Hibari-kun!. He used his now current wife as a model for Haruko. Eguchi also played part in some of the film's animation, such as its smoke effects, alongside key animator Takeshi Honda. Both Otomo and Mitsuo Iso were responsible for the mechanical designs. Satoshi Kon acted as the film's art director and set designer. Kon previously wrote the script for Otomo's live-action black comedy World Apartment Horror, though Roujin Z was the first anime on which Kon worked. Otomo opted to not direct the film, as he was more eager to work on World Apartment Horror. The musical score was composed by Bun Itakura. Anime localization pioneer Carl Macek was the film's sound design producer. The closing song "Hashire Jitensha" (走れ自転車; lit. 'Run, Bicycle Run') is performed by Mishio Ogawa.

=== Soundtrack ===
All tracks are written by Bun Itakura.

Roujin Z Original Soundtrack (老人Z サウンドトラック)
No.	Title	Length
1.	"Sensei (宣誓; Declaration)"	0:07
2.	"Z [Accepter]"	2:59
3.	"Aisatsu #1 (挨拶 #1; Greeting #1)"	0:08
4.	"Happy Circle [Opening Title]"	2:18
5.	"Impressions of a MOMENTO"	4:16
6.	"Interlude - Hello Liddy"	0:51
7.	"Metabolism #1~#4"	3:34
8.	"Aisatsu #2 (挨拶 #2; Greeting #2)"	0:08
9.	"Ornament Love"	1:20
10.	"New Type"	2:08
11.	"Escape"	0:59
12.	"Interlude - Hustle Muscle→A(W.T.D.)...Wild Today's Description"	2:43
13.	"Spring"	1:55
14.	"Stepping Smart [#1 Dark House, #2 Chase]"	4:36
15.	"Interlude - Hollow Dolly"	1:36
16.	"Yume no Sanbashi (夢の桟橋; A Pier of Dream) [#2 Evening]"	2:14
17.	"Hashire Jitensha (走れ自転車; Run, Bicycle, Run) [Ending Roll]"	4:39
Total length:		36:31

== Release and marketing ==
Roujin Z premiered theatrically in Japan on September 14, 1991. An English-dubbed version was directed by Michael Bakewell with a script adaptation by George Roubicek. The dub was produced by Manga Entertainment in 1994, and was licensed by Kit Parker Films with a PG-13 rating in the United States. The film debuted in the US at an international film festival in Fort Lauderdale during November 1994. It was screened in more than 30 cities in the country such as New York City's Angelika Film Center on January 5, 1996. Manga Entertainment marketed the film in English-speaking regions as being "by the creator of Akira".

Roujin Z first saw VHS and Laserdisc releases in Japan in 1991, in Great Britain, Europe and Australia in 1994, in North America in 1995, and its first Japanese DVD release on August 21, 1999. An "HD Master Edition" DVD was released in the region on April 13, 2005. The English dub was initially released on VHS by Manga Entertainment in the United Kingdom, Australia, and New Zealand in 1994. Image Entertainment distributed the English version on DVD in the US on August 26, 1998. Central Park Media re-released the movie on DVD on April 9, 2002, then again on April 27, 2004, under the US Manga Corps label. The home video version is currently out-of-print in the US. The film has also been broadcast on numerous television networks worldwide, including the Sci-Fi Channel, ImaginAsian, the International Channel, and the Funimation Channel in the United States.

The Roujin Z Original Soundtrack was made available for sale in Japan by Epic Records on November 21, 1991. Roujin Z was adapted into a manga titled ZeD (ゼッド, Zeddo), featuring the story by Otomo and illustrated by Tai Okada. It was originally serialized in the Kodansha publication Mr. Magazine from March to December 1991. A single tankōbon bound volume was published in Japan on December 12, 1991. No official English version exists, but Glénat published a French edition on January 22, 1997.

Manga Entertainment UK re-released Roujin Z on Blu-ray in June 2012 in conjunction with Kazé UK, the European subsidiary of Viz Media as they hold the rights to the English dub, which they produced in-house in 1994.

== Reception ==
From contemporary reviews, Roujin Z won the Mainichi Film Award for Best Animation Film in 1991. From Western critics, Stephen Holden of The New York Times called it an "amusing futuristic morality tale," noting how it "takes sharp digs at yuppie medical students who welcome a device that will enable them to discard their aging parents and concentrate on their careers." Joey O'Bryan, reviewing Roujin Z for The Austin Chronicle, called the film "briskly paced, intelligent, exciting, and darkly funny." Roger Ebert, writing in the Chicago Sun-Times, observed: "I cannot imagine this story being told in a conventional movie. Not only would the machine be impossibly expensive and complex to create with special effects, but the social criticism would be immediately blue-penciled by Hollywood executives." Tony Rayns (Sight & Sound) felt the film was "engaging entertainment, not least because it so resolutely counters the expectations of the adolescent males who made up the core audience for Akira." Rayns also noted that "the only real let down in the film was the character design of Haruko", finding her to be "the round-eyed moppet of the type seen everywhere in Japanese schlock made-for-video animation"

From retrospective reviews, Helen McCarthy in 500 Essential Anime Movies called Roujin Z a "gripping movie - an action thriller whose star is even older than Bruce Willis". She stated that it is a "funny film that will keep you entertained and make you think", noting that it is also "one of the most original anime you'll ever see". In 2001, Wizard Entertainment listed the film at number 42 of its top 50 anime to be released in North America. The publisher's magazine Anime Insider listed Roujin Z as the seventh-best anime comedy in its January 2004 issue.

== See also ==
- List of Japanese films of 1991
