= Hiroyuki Kitakubo =

Japanese director, animator, and screenwriter

- Born: 北久保 弘之; November 15, 1963 (age 62); Bunkyo, Tokyo, Japan
- Occupations: Director; animator; screenwriter
- Writing career
- Notable works: Robot Carnival; Roujin Z; Golden Boy; Blood: The Last Vampire
- Notable awards: "Individual Award": The 6th Animation Kobe (2001)

Hiroyuki Kitakubo (北久保 弘之, Kitakubo Hiroyuki; born November 15, 1963) is a Japanese director, animator, and screenwriter.

Kitakubo began work in the anime industry as a teenager, having worked on the 1979 Mobile Suit Gundam television series. He debuted as a director with the Cream Lemon episode "Pop Chaser" in 1985, then worked on films including Black Magic M-66 with Masamune Shirow and Akira with Katsuhiro Otomo. Kitakubo went on to direct the "A Tale of Two Robots" segment from Robot Carnival, the original video animation (OVA) series Golden Boy, and the films Roujin Z and Blood: The Last Vampire. In 2001, Kitakubo won the "Individual Award" at The 6th Animation Kobe for the latter film. Blood: The Last Vampire also won grand prize at the 2000 Japan Media Arts Festival and first prize the 2001 World Animation Celebration.
