= The Last of the Mohicans (disambiguation) =

The Last of the Mohicans is an adventure novel by James Fenimore Cooper. From the title of this novel comes the English phrase the last of the Mohicans, meaning the final remaining person or thing of a particular group or era, or one of the last persons to remain convinced of a particular idea. The phrase also exists in several other languages, including Spanish, German and Dutch.

The Last of the Mohicans may also refer to:

In film and television:

- The Last of the Mohicans (1911 film)
- The Last of the Mohicans (1920 American film)
- The Last of the Mohicans (1920 German film)
- The Last of the Mohicans (1932 serial)
- The Last of the Mohicans (1936 film)
- Hawkeye and the Last of the Mohicans, an American/Canadian television series
- The Last of the Mohicans (1965 film), a 1965 Italian/Spanish film, directed by Mateo Cano
- The Last of the Mohicans (1965 film), a 1965 West German film, directed by Harald Reinl
- The Last of the Mohicans (1968 film), a 1968 Romanian/French/West German film
- The Last of the Mohicans (TV series), a 1971 BBC television series starring Philip Madoc
- Last of the Mohicans (1977 film), a 1977 television film
- The Last of the Mohicans, a 1987 animated film produced by Burbank Films Australia
- The Last of the Mohicans (1992 film), a 1992 film starring Daniel Day-Lewis

In music:

- The Last of the Mohicans (EP), a 1982 EP by Bow Wow Wow
- The Last of the Mohicans (soundtrack), the soundtrack album of the 1992 film

In literature:

- The Last Mohican, a 1958 short story by Bernard Malamud

== See also ==
- "The Last of the Meheecans", an episode of South Park parodying the adventure novel
