= List of Kiteretsu Daihyakka episodes =

This is a list of Kiteretsu Daihyakka episodes. The anime aired from March 27, 1988, to June 9, 1996, in Japan.

== Episode list ==
EP#	Japanese title	English title	Air date
1	大発見!キテレツ大百科	Great discovery! Kiteretsu Large Encyclopedia	1987; 11-2
2	つよいぞ!唐倶利武者	It's Strong! The Karakuri Warrior	1987; 11-2
3	しん気ろうでやっつけろ	Get That Mirage	1987; 11-2
4	空のご用はキテレツ航空	Kiteretsu Airlines for the sky	1987; 11-2
5	片道タイムマシン	One-way time machine	1987; 11-2
6	キッコー船の大冒険	Kikko Ship's Great Adventure	1987; 11-2

EP#	Japanese title	English title	Air date
1	ワガハイはコロ助ナリ	I'm Korosuke	1988; 3-27
1	潜地球で宝さがし!	Searching for buried treasures! My Own Invention that got Big Treasure!	1988; 3-27
2	サクラ散ル勉三さん	A Reinvention I made for Benzo	4-3
2	動物しばいを作るナリ	Korosuke becomes a Director!	4-3
3	手作りロケットで月までアドベンチャー	Kiteretsu's Moon adventure	4-10
4	くらやみでドキドキ	Troubled in the dark A Magic Costume Saved Everyone	4-17
4	うらみキャンデー	The Grudge Candies; I had to Make Revenge Candy!	4-17
5	てんぐの抜け穴でらくらくハイキング	Goblin Secret passage	4-24
6	帰って来たからくり武者	Look Look! The Warrior is Here	5-1
6	如意光でひっこし	Ini-Mini-Mynih! Everything is Tiny!	5-1
7	みよちゃんとままごとハウス	I Will Play House with Miyoko	5-8
7	わすれん帽!?	Just Forget It!	5-8
8	宇宙怪魔人ブタゴリラ	Let's Make a Movie	5-15
8	ミニタウンで遊ぼう	Big Fun in the Small City!	5-15
9	思い出カメラ	Camera of memories	5-22
9	対決!コロ助対かわら版小僧	Showdown! Korosuke against Kawarabankozou	5-22
10	コロ助と赤ちゃん恐竜!南の海の大冒険!!	Korosuke and the baby dinosaur!	5-29
11	分身機で人間コピー!?	Human Duplication Gun	6-5
11	コロ助学校へ行く	Korosuke Goes to School	6-5
12	脱時機でのんびり	Machine which can stop time	6-12
12	水遊びもほどほどに	Playing with water	6-12
13	雲の上のスイートホーム	Sweet home above clouds	6-19
14	ちょうちんおバケ捕物帖	Crime catcher robot	6-26
14	怪談ボタン灯	Ghost Lamp	6-26
15	一寸ガードマン	A Little Bodyguard	7-3
15	シャボン玉ドーム	Giant Bubble Dome	7-3
16	パパたちの授業参観親子で野球大会	Father's day meeting	7-10
17	悲しみのトンガリかくれみので一人ぼっち	Tongari becomes invisible	8-14
18	エジソンに会った誰にもいえない夏休み	We will meet Edison	8-21
19	ひんやりヒエヒエ水ねんど	The Heat has got Everyone Soaked	8-28
19	台風と夏まつり	Peter-Pater-Jimer-Jamer-Trip-Grip-Rip!	8-28
20	コロ助!パワーアップ大作戦	Korosuke does Everything to Become Stronger!	9-4
21	走れ42.195キロ!マラソンはこりごりナリ!?	Changing Marathon Time	9-11
22	町内運動会MVPは誰の手に!?	Sports Meet, Who Will Become MVP	10-2
23	ふりかけはコロッケの味	Butagorira's Vegetable Party	10-16
23	きき耳ずきん	Animal Voice Translator	10-16
24	昼行灯で百点満点	Lantern Makes Study Easy	10-23
24	コロ助恋に落ちて	Robots Have Feelings Too	10-23
25	キョーレツ!!怪人ドテカボチャン	Laughing Helmet	10-30
26	ひかえい!黄門サマは大悪人?	Everyone Will Obey Me	11-6
27	やればできる!逆あがり必勝法	Kiteretsu Will Do Somersault	11-13
28	夢のつんつるつづら	Wicker Cloth Box	11-20
28	コロ助がお見合い	Korosuke's Matchmaking With a Dog	11-20
29	アッチッチ!温泉さがして地底探検	Searching For Hot Springs Deep in the Earth	11-27
30	コロ助とチビゴリラの友情物語	The story of Korosuke and Chibigorira's friendship	12-4
31	君こそスターだ!浦島亀太郎	Otohime Loves Kiteretsu	12-11
32	キテレツ斎様は千両役者!?	Kiteretsu-san is an Actor	12-18
33	サンタクロース見ーつけた	Santa Claus is Real	12-25

EP#	Japanese title	English title	Air date
34	みよちゃんの花ムコ占い10年後は成人式	Coming-of-age ceremony 10 years after Miyo-chan's flower muco fortune-telling	1-16
35	雪国でミステリー	Mystery in the Country of Snow	1-16
36	ブタゴリラのスケート特訓	ButaGorilla learns how to Skate	1-22
36	寒中水泳大会	The Swimming Championship!	1-22
37	新一年生必見!赤いランドセルの女の子	Little Girl with a Red Bag	1-29
38	王子と結婚!?みよ子姫	Married a Prince!? Princess Miyoko	2-5
39	北斗星で北の国へUターン	Travelling to Hokayedo	2-12
40	コロ助秀才になる!?	Mock Test in School	2-19
41	コロ助若さまのいいなずけ	Young Master Korosuke's Fiancé	2-26
42	恐竜からの招待状南の国へいらっしゃい!	Invitation from a dinosaur Welcome to the southern country!	3-12
43	ブタゴリラのあこがれは年上の女の子?	Is the pig gorilla longing for an older girl?	3-19
44	ウルトラ迷路でウロウロどっきり!?	It 's an ultra maze and it 's so clear!?	3-26
45	一獲千金まぼろしの蝶を探せ	Find a butterfly that is a ghost	4-16
46	呼べばこたえるヤマビコ野菜	Yamabiko vegetables that answer when you call	4-23
47	まかフシギ?乙姫様が鶴の恩返し	Maka Fushigi? Otohime-sama gives back the crane	4-30
48	地震のつくり方	How to make an earthquake	5-7
48	思い出ハウスで仲直り	Make up at Memories House	5-7
49	当選確実!クラス委員は脚光灯で	Winning is certain! Class representatives are in the limelight	5-14
50	ウソ!あのブタゴリラが野菜嫌いに!?	Lie! That pig gorilla hates vegetables!?	5-21
51	キンキラ金山見つけた地底の大冒険	Kinkira Kanayama The Underground Adventure I Found	5-28
52	大人気!5年3組白鳥先生	Very popular! 5th grade 3rd group Shiratori sensei	6-4
53	恐怖の九官鳥・コロ助が危ない!	The scary nine official bird, Korosuke is dangerous!	6-18
54	感激鐘で武士の目にも涙ナリ	Tears in the eyes of the samurai with an inspiring bell	6-25
55	キテレツ大ピンチ?パパの発明禁止令!	Kiteretsu big pinch? Daddy's invention ban!	7-9
56	撮影快調!ハリウッドのバビロン大宮殿	Shooting is in good shape! Babylon Grand Palace in Hollywood	7-23
57	大予言!コロ助のあした草紙	Great prophecy! Korosuke's tomorrow's paper	7-30
58	ついに発明!夏休みを3倍にする夢遊境	Finally invented! Sleepwalking that triples summer vacation	8-6
59	骨折り損のくたびれ小槌	Tired gavel	8-13
60	八月のある日、迷い子クジラが空とんだ	One day in August, a lost whale flew away	8-20
61	こわいの飛んでけ!三半鏡でバッチリ	Fly scary! Perfect with a three-sided mirror	8-27
62	おばけがいっぱい!?キャンプでパニック	Lots of ghosts!? Pan camp	9-3
63	走れ!トンガリ号夢の四駆グランプリ	Run! Tongari Dream 4x4 Grand Prix	9-10
64	まことナリ!キッコー船で山のぼり	Makoto Nari! Climbing a mountain on a Kikko boat	9-17
65	ゴリラとブタゴリラ・どっちがゴリラ	Gorilla or pig gorilla, which is the gorilla	10-1
66	大爆笑!あの乙姫がやって来た	LOL! That princess has arrived	10-22
67	雨あめ降れふれ!忘れな傘を君の手に	It's raining! With a forgotten umbrella in your hands	10-29
68	邪馬台国の謎に迫る!みよ子がヒミコ?	Approaching the mystery of Yamatai country! Miyoko is Himiko?	11-5
69	秋探しみんなそろって結婚式フルコース	Wedding full course for everyone looking for autumn	11-12
70	テストもバッチリ!!一夜漬けマクラ	The test is perfect !! Overnight pickled macula	11-19
71	あと5分!そんなときこそ時間逆転機	5 minutes left! That's when the time reverser machine	11-26
72	みつばちじいやがやって来た	Mitsubachi Jiya has arrived	12-3
73	サンタの孫はマッチ売りの少女ナリ!	Santa's grandson is a match-selling girl Nari!	12-10
74	ついに成功!2001年大学キャンパスの旅	Finally Success! 2001 University Campus Trip	12-17
75	見たか悪漢!二刀流コロ助西部を行く	Did you see it? Go to the western part of Korosuke	12-24
