= Boes =

Dutch comic series

Boes (English name "Ox Tales")
- Album cover of an oblong comic, depicting Boes and Dolly the tortoise.
- Author(s): Thijs Wilms (writing) and Wil Raymakers (art)
- Launch date: 1980
- End date: 2011
- Genre(s): Gag-a-day comic, pantomime comic, stop comic, funny animal comic

Boes ("Ox Tales") is a Dutch newspaper gag-a-day comic strip created by Wil Raymakers and Thijs Wilms. It was created in 1980 and spawned a popular anime television series between 1988 and 1991, titled Ox Tales in the English-speaking world. The comic managed to outlive the animated adaptation and continued to appear as a column strip in various Dutch daily and weekly newspapers until 2011.

== Concept ==
"Boes" is a pantomime gag-a-day comic about an anthropomorphic ox who walks on clogs in a landscape that resembles the farm lands in the Netherlands. He works as a farmer. Many gags that focused on his comedic interactions with animals. While many gags are child-friendly there are also gags which have more risqué humour involving sex, toilet humor and obscene gestures. The series has a few recurring characters who are unnamed in the comics, but received names in the animated series. They are Dolly the tortoise, Shampoo the gorilla and Saffie the dog. In the English dub for the series, they are named Jack, Gaylord, and Sammy.

Between 1981 and 1982, William-Dickens Productions published two albums with gags. Between 1986 and 1989, 14 albums were published in oblong format by Uitgeverij Drukwerk (nrs. 1–10) and Standaard Uitgeverij (nrs. 11–14). Standaard Uitgeverij republished four albums with gags between 1989 and 1993 and gave them distinguishable titles: "Ossehaas" (1989), "Kippevel" (1991), "Hamsterwoede" (1992) and "Stierengevecht" (1993).

In 1988, three comic book albums were published by Standaard Uitgeverij where Boes has longer stories and in which he and other characters talk to one another. These albums were titled: "Een harde noot" ("A hard nut"), "Een nieuw erf" ("A new yard") and "De schaapscheerder" ("The sheep shearer").

In 2011, three new albums with gags were published by Nona Arte.

== Animated series ==
In 1987, the comic series was adapted into an animated television series, produced by Telecable Benelux B.V., Teleimage Japan Inc., and Meander Studio. A total of 102 episodes were made and aired internationally in 11 languages: English, Spanish, Italian, Dutch, Hebrew, Portuguese, French, German, Swedish, Norwegian and Croatian.
