= A.P.P.P. =

Japanese animation studio

- Native name: 有限会社アナザープッシュピンプランニング
- Romanized name: Yūgen-gaisha Anazā Pusshupin Puranningu
- Type: Yūgen gaisha
- Industry: Animation studio
- Founded: 22 June 1984
- Founder: Kazufumi Nomura
- Defunct: 31 July 2021
- Fate: Dissolved
- Headquarters: Suginami, Tokyo, Japan
- Key people: Kazufumi Nomura (president)
- Products: Anime
- Website: appp.web.fc2.com

A.P.P.P. Co., Ltd. (Japanese: 有限会社アナザープッシュピンプランニング, Hepburn: Yūgen-gaisha Anazā Pusshupin Puranningu; abbreviated from Another Push Pin Planning, pronounced as "A Three P") was a Japanese animation studio founded on 22 June 1984, and based in Suginami, Tokyo, Japan. A subsidiary company called Super Techno Arts distributed many of their properties in North America. The founder of A.P.P.P., Kazufumi Nomura, got his start working at Mushi Production. Since its establishment, A.P.P.P. has contributed to the animation of a very large number of anime films and television series in collaboration with other companies. A.P.P.P. has been primarily credited for works including Project A-ko, Robot Carnival, and Roujin Z. A.P.P.P. remained active as a subcontractor for other studios until its dissolution on 31 July 2021, after Nomura died on 10 June.

== Works ==
=== Television series ===
- Kurogane Communication (1998–1999)
- Black Heaven (1999, with AIC)
- Omishi Magical Theater: Risky Safety (1999–2000)
- Sci-Fi Harry (2000–2001)
- Fist of the Blue Sky (2006–2007)

=== OVA/ONAs ===
‡ indicates hentai productions.

- Cream Lemon (1984–1987, with Fairy Dust)‡
- Project A-ko 2: Plot of the Daitokuji Financial Group (1987)
- Ore no Sora Keiji-hen (1991–1992)
- JoJo's Bizarre Adventure (1993–2002)
- Crimson Wolf (1993)
- Rance: Sabaku no Guardian (1993)
- F³ (1994, with Pink Pineapple)‡
- Golden Boy (1995–1996)
- Kaitōranma: The Animation (Samurai: Hunt for the Sword, 快刀乱麻 THE ANIMATION) (1999)
- Sexy Sailor Soldiers (2003)‡
- Kage (2004)‡
- Fist of the North Star: Legend of Toki (2008, with TMS Entertainment)

=== Films ===
- Project A-ko (1986)
- Robot Carnival (1987)
- Roujin Z (1991)
- Street Fighter Alpha: Generations (2005)
- JoJo's Bizarre Adventure: Phantom Blood (2007)

== Reception And Impact ==
A.P.P.P. as a name remains largely unknown in the western anime community, however, many of their works have become cult classics which are remembered and celebrated till this day. Clips from Golden Boy, The JoJo OVAs, and Robot Carnival regularly make their rounds on social media, YouTube, and various communities.
