= Sexy Sailor Soldiers =

Japanese manga series and its adaptations

- First volume cover, featuring Nami Koishikawa

奈美SOS! (Nami Esuōesu!)
- Genre: Erotic comedy; Hentai; Magical girl
- Manga

Nami SOS!
- Written by: Chataro
- Published by: Tatsumi Publishing
- Imprint: Fujimi Comics
- Original run: May 20, 1995 – December 22, 2011
- Volumes: 5
- Original video animation
- Directed by: Masaharu Tomoda
- Music by: Riverside Music
- Studio: A.P.P.P.
- Licensed by: NA: Critical Mass Video
- Released: October 25, 2003
- Runtime: 30 minutes
- icon

Sexy Sailor Soldiers, known in Japan as Nami SOS! (奈美SOS!, Nami Esuōesu!), is a Japanese hentai manga series written and illustrated by Chataro, released in five volumes from 1995 to 2011. An original video animation (OVA) adaptation, animated by A.P.P.P., was released by Moonrock in 2003. The OVA was licensed for English release in North America by Critical Mass Video in 2006.

== Synopsis ==
Nami Koishikawa's curvaceous figure gets her a lot of (sometimes unwanted) attention. At the end of her first day working at a restaurant, she rushes to the aid of an injured woman behind her workplace. The woman hands her a strange-looking pendant and begs her to "take her place". Nami wonders why she was given the pendant and what its purpose is. Moments later, during an awkward situation on her way home, Nami accidentally presses the pendant and, to the surprise of everyone, transforms into a Sexy Sailor Soldier in a skimpy uniform.

The mission of a "soldier" is to hunt and eliminate demons, of whom normal people (such as Nami's brother Katsuo), are unaware. Nami notices that, once she transforms, she gains magical powers, but she is initially too scared to use them for anything but running away. The pendant Nami received raises pheromone levels in transformed soldiers, driving all demons crazy with sexual desire and alerting the holder to be ready to protect herself.

Nami does not know this, which makes her first demon hunt difficult. She is chased by a demon with no way to escape until they arrive at a skyscraper. Chisato Yamane, Nami's best friend, is already a veteran soldier and knows what to do. Chisato tries to rescue Nami by fighting the demon. However, despite her efforts, both of them are captured in a portal with dozens of demons. Nami manages to free them from the portal and other soldiers help them by fighting off the pursuing demons.

== Characters ==
Nami Koishikawa (奈美小石川, Nami Koishikawa)
Voiced by: Naoko Yamamoto (Japanese); Kelly Benz (English)
A blonde-haired girl and the last to become part of the Soldier Girls team. She is an innocent girl who does not know why all men are attracted to her. Nami enjoys wearing skimpy work uniforms, though she can never find one that does not put her breasts in danger of popping out. Inadvertently, she will instantly change her clothes into a soldier's uniform by pressing the "Lust Eye". When she gets defensive in the battlefield, she uses a wooden stick, which can be turned into a sharp sword through the magic in her pendant eye. It can also unleash a blinding light that is one of the demon's greatest weaknesses. One of her biggest problems is finding out how to use the power she possesses to protect everyone and everything from demons.
Chisato Yamane (千里山根, Chisato Yamane)
Voiced by: Miru (Japanese); Saucy App (English)
She has the appearance of a normal waitress, but she is always concerned about demons hidden among normal people. She is already in the group of soldiers before Nami, so Chisato helps and protects her friend from demons, as long as she is not captured first. Nami's brother, Katsuo, is the one who Chisato secretly loves, but she has no time to speak when they find themselves in a critical situation. Disregarding her secret identity, she transforms in front of Katsuo. He is probably the only one who knows her true identity. Transformed into a sailor, she wears a pink uniform. Her soldier weapon is a baton which discharges electric charges. However, it takes time to generate the electricity, making it easy to block or to use the baton against her.
Katsuo (勝男)
Voiced by: Ibuki Yamamoto (Japanese); Tony DeLongo (English)
He is responsible for his sister Nami, so he would try to protect her at all costs. He has the wrong idea of what the Sailor Soldier suit is for, so he does not let his sister join the group. He is a lonely man and, when his sister is out, he takes the opportunity to watch sex movies. He has no special or magical powers, but he has strength that is effective only with normal people, not with demons. He still finds other ways to protect his sister.
Mr. Sasao (氏笹尾, Shi Sasao)
Voiced by: Shiro Narumi (Japanese); Dr. Julius V. Savage (English)
The captain of the sexual demons. He uses his disguise as a bespectacled, brunet restaurant boss to keep an eye on his victims. An odd skill for him is sewing extremely skimpy uniforms for one special waitress he has just employed. Nobody realizes his demonic nature until he comes into contact with Nami and he's forced to metamorphose into a winged demon with long purple tentacles. During a long chase of a soldier, he arrives at the highest building of the city where, thanks to one of Sasao's darkness portals, his secret demon clan appears inside. They await news about captured soldiers. When Sasao opens a gate to their portal, they are sure Mr. Sasao will approve anything as captain of sexual demons. They anticipate enjoying time with the captives provided by Mr. Sasao. Once Nami Koishikawa recovers her control of her body from Sasao, she and her friend are freed from their captivity. However, Sasao fights against them, and he and Nami are forced to fight to the death. The demon clan is an easy target for the soldiers. However, Sasao is a difficult demon to destroy, especially because he has the ability to cause instant death with his tentacles, and his body can instantly recover from deadly wounds inflicted by a sword.

== Release ==
Sexy Sailor Soldiers is based on Chataro's original manga Nami SOS!, which spawned five volumes released by Tatsumi Publishing's Fujimi Comics imprint from May 20, 1995, to December 22, 2011. (Note: Volumes: 1; 2; 3; 4; 5)

An original video animation (OVA), titled in Japan Nami SOS! First Battle (奈美SOS! ファースト・バトル, Nami Esuōesu! Fāsuto Batoru), was animated by A.P.P.P. and released by Moonrock on October 25, 2003. The OVA was licensed in North America by Critical Mass Video and released on DVD on June 27, 2006. It was re-released on October 2, 2012.
