= Ox Tales =

Animated television series

- Screenshot
- げらげらブース物語
- Based on: Boes by Wil Raymakers and Thijs Wilms
- Directed by: Hiroshi Sasagawa (chief)
- Music by: Shinsuke Kazato
- Countries of origin: Japan; Netherlands
- Original language: Japanese
- No. of episodes: 51 (102 segments)

Production
- Producers: Nobuomi Nakamura (TV Tokyo); Kazuo Tabata (Telecable); Sumio Takahashi; Yoshikazu Tochihira
- Cinematography: Hisao Shirai
- Editors: Seiji Morita; Masaki Sakamoto
- Running time: 25 minutes
- Production companies: TV Tokyo; Telescreen (Note: Production assistance for all episodes provided by Wako Production and Menda.)

Original release
- Network: MegaTON (TV Tokyo) (Japan); Nederland 2 (Netherlands)
- Release: 7 April 1987 – 29 March 1988

Ox Tales, also known as The Tales of Boes' Gang (げらげらブース物語, Geragera Būsu Monogatari) is an anime television series produced by Telecable Benelux B.V. and animated by Telescreen Japan. It was a co-production between Japan and the Netherlands based on the comic strip Boes created by Wil Raymakers and Thijs Wilms. The series ran on the Japanese network TV Tokyo from 7 April 1987 to 29 March 1988. It consists of 102 fifteen-minute episodes, that were regularly broadcast as 51 half-hour shows of two episodes each. The series currently has two English dubs: a 1989 dub produced by Saban Entertainment and the 2010 dub produced by m4e, the then-current owner of the Telescreen library.

== Plot ==
The series follows the adventures of Boes as he runs the Funny Farm, containing possibly every animal known.

== Characters ==
=== Main characters ===
- Boes (Ollie in the first dub) is an ox that owns the Funny Farm and is not exactly the greenest grass on the farm. Although he means well, for some reasons, he makes situations worse than they normally are, but this is actually rare.
- Tad (Jack Turtleson in the first dub) is a turtle who is Ollie's best friend, as he is seen mostly hanging out with him in each episode, but in every mess that he and Ollie/Boes get into, his shell breaks apart at least once. In the Dutch comics and anime version, along with the Italian version, he is a female turtle.
- Saffie (Sammy in the first dub) is a greyhound and Boes'/Ollie's most loyal pet on the farm who accompanies Ollie/Boes and Jack/Tad on their adventures in some episodes.

=== Others ===
- Edward is an elephant who acts as a fireman.
- Ellie the Elephant
- Igor the Octopus
- Crown the Bald eagle
- Gaylord is a Mountain gorilla who usually does not know his own strength at times.
- Audrey is an ostrich who usually gets his head stuck in the ground somewhere on the farm.
- Rodney is a hot-headed Black rhinoceros who cannot seem to keep his horn on or even in for one part.
- Holly the Kangaroo
- Bob the Kangaroo
- Weave the Kangaroo
- Jenny the Kangaroo
- Teddie the Kangaroo
- Larry the Cheetah
- Lenny is a lion that imagines himself as a great hunter, although he cannot seem to take the initiative when he finally catches his food.
- Towilla is a sarcastic Toco toucan who is the narrator of the English, German and Japanese dubs of the show and normally would insult a character and comment on what happens in the episode and will interrupted by the events in the episode. He breaks the fourth wall for some reason.
- Bruce is a greedy grizzly bear who often tries to steal Ollie's honey.
- Buggy the Stork
- Horace is a hot-headed and stubborn Thoroughbred horse that tends to have a knack for fighting.
- Moe is a mole who acts as a comic relief.
- Harry the Sloth
- Hannah is the leader of a gang of chickens that never take kindly to having their eggs stolen by predators.
- Mr. Croack the Frog
- Bibbo the Owl
- Jojo is an olive baboon who likes to climb.
- Samson is a sea lion who likes to play with volleyballs.
- Shirley is a lazy Cheviot sheep.
- Walter the Woodpecker
- Willy the Woodpecker
- Helda the Hippopotamus
- Robby the Chicken
- Paul the Polar Bear
- Donny the Stork
- Nessie the Cow
- Calvin is a calf who always has the need to suck on an udder.
- Topsy the Aardvark
- Tom the Turkey
- Tim the Orangutan
- Patrick the Porcupine
- The MacDuffs are a group of storks.
- Snuffles the panda
- Zane is a zebra who has about as much stubbornness as Horace.
- Peggy is a female Yorkshire pig.
- Peter the Pig
- Jolly the dolphin
- Cecil is a mischievous skunk with both an abundant flatulence issue and a rather sadistic habit of only wanting to relieve his massive amounts of gas, if he can do so in the presence of others.
- Bura the Crow
- Rott the Parrot
- Cal is a Saltwater crocodile with a big appetite, and will try to eat any animal on the farm, but fails to do so in any way.
- Morris is a strategic mouse who knows how to get away in a hurry, and ruin mouse-catching plans of others in the process.
- Calvin the Cat is a Bengal cat that acts as the mouse hunter on the farm, although Morris mostly gets the better of him.

== Theme songs ==
=== Japanese version ===
Kimi no freedom (君のフリーダム)

- Performed by Raffle (OP)

Joke DE mou dash (ジョークDE猛ダッシュ)

- Performed by Koorogi '73 (OP)

== Credits ==
=== Original credits ===
- Directors: Hiroshi Sasagawa, Maki Nakahara (co-director)
- From an original idea by: Wil Raymakers, Thijs Wilms, Maki Nakahara
- Music: Shinsuke Kazato (original version), Clous van Mechelen (Dutch version)
- Special effects and sound design: Hisao Shirai
- Series composition: Matsue Jinbo, Tony Dirne, Rob Dirne, Mario de Vries
- Writers: Nao Furukawa, Toshi Ohira, Kiyoshi Onishi, Kaoru Jushina
- Executive producer: Dennis Livson
- Prosucer: Kazuo Tabata

=== Saban English version credits ===
- Executive producer: Haim Saban
- Supervising producer: Winston Richard
- Directors: Robert V. Barron, Tom Wyner
- Executive in charge of production: Jerald E. Bergh
- Associate producer: Eric S. Rollman
- Script supervisor: Tony Oliver
- Music by: Haim Saban & Shuki Levy
- Original idea and character designs: Wil Raymakers, Thijs Wilms
- Re-recording mixers: Clive Mizumoto, Gary Coppola, R.D. Floyd
- Music administration: Ron Kenan
- Music supervisor: Andrew Dimitroff
- Music orchestrations and arrangements by: Barry Trop, Richard Firth
- Music engineers: Barron Abramovitch, Xavier Garcia
- Music editors: Nick Carr Paul Ray, Patrick Von Wiegandt, Mark Ryan Martin
- Sound effects editors: Gary Jaye, John Valentino, Scott Page
- Additional direction: Scott Page, Jeff Winkless
- Script and talent coordinator: Kelly Griffin
- Engineers: Scott Page, Bruce Peters, David Walsh
- Assistant engineers: Ron Salaises, Kevin Newson, Bill Filipiak
- Film transfers by: Action Video
- On-line editor: Susan Jenkins
- Title art by: Sam Johnson
- Post production assistant: Amber Santilli
- Assistant to Mr. Saban: Sherry Jeffreys
- Accounting executive: Carol Diesel
- Production accountants: Vicky Werby, Val Decrowl, Janice Auchterloine, Sharon Staine
- Copyright 1987/88 Meander Studio/Telecable Benelux/TV Tokyo
- Copyright 1989 Saban Productions, Saban International Services, Inc., Saban International N.V.

=== Saban English dubbed episode writers ===
- Tracy Alexander
- Robert Axelrod ("If The Clog Fits...")
- Robert V. Barron
- Robert Benedict
- Robert Deutsch
- Melora Harte
- Dave Mallow
- Benjamin Lesko
- Richard Epcar
- Tony Oliver
- Steve Kramer
- Doug Stone
- Michael McConnohie
- Mike Reynolds
- Barbara Riel
- Donald Roche
- Michael Sorich
- Jeff Winkless
- Tom Wyner
- Shannon Mahan
- Eric Elfman
- Lisa Paulette
- Dayna Barron
- Wendee Manhel
- Johnny Goff
- Heather Upjohn
- Tim Reid
- Michael Santiago
- Jon Page
- Byrd Ehlmann
- Ann Burgund
- Nora L. Goodman
- Joe Ellison
- Edie Mirman
- Ardwight Chamberlain
- Barbara Oliver
- Mark Ryan-Martin
- Eric Early

=== Saban English dubbed voice actors ===
- Jeff Winkless - Olly the Ox, additional characters
- Michael Sorich - Jack Turtleson, additional characters
- Steve Kramer - Towilla the Toucan, additional characters
- Barbara Goodson - Moe the Mole, additional characters

=== Hoek & Sonépouse English version credits ===
- Dubbing of English version: Hoek & Sonépouse
- With the voices of: Michael Diederich, Amber Ruffin, Rob Andrist-Plourde and Brian Tijon Ajong
- Director of English version: Michael Diederich
- Translation of English version: Michael Diederich
- Worldwide distribution: Telescreen B.V
- © 2010 re-mastered and revised version: Meander Studio, Telecable Benelux, TV Tokyo

== Episodes ==
This is a list of episodes, with the dates being from ITV.

1. Raising the Roof/Horsing Around (15 July 1991)
2. Dr Ollie/Funny Farm (16 July 1991)
3. Porker Problems/Fishy Story (17 July 1991)
4. Up, Up and Away/Feeding Frenzy (18 July 1991)
5. Homing in on Love/Dumb Cluck (19 July 1991)
6. All's Well that ends in a Well/Fowl Friends (22 July 1991)
7. Snow Ox/The Race (23 July 1991)
8. A Dairy Dilemma/A Beak too Far (24 July 1991)
9. Lion Around/Under the Weather (29 July 1991)

== Broadcast and home media ==
In Japan, the series aired on the four TX Network stations of the time (TX, TVA, TVO and TSC). It was syndicated to Miyagi Television Broadcasting and Toyama Television.

The series has been aired in several countries outside Japan and has been dubbed and subtitled in English and numerous other languages. The series was broadcast in the United Kingdom several times between 1991 and 1996, on the ITV network.

In the Netherlands, the series first aired on the children's slot of VARA on Nederland 1 on the evening of 6 October 1988.

The series aired on RTP1 in Portugal in 1989/1990. Initially the original Dutch intro was broadcast before being replaced by an instrumental theme.

In the late 1990s, the series was planned to air on Fox Family in the United States, but this was scrapped for unknown reasons.

In the US, a few episodes of the show were released on VHS by Just for Kids in the early 1990s; the show was officially released on DVD in Portugal and Spain in 2006.

In 1989, in Arab World it first aired on Saudi TV.

In the 2010s, the entire series was uploaded by YouTube's m4e channel.
