= Cream Lemon =

1984 hentai series

- Cream Lemon: Mako Sexy Symphony cover

くりいむレモン or くりぃむレモン (Kurīmu Remon)
- Genre: Hentai
- Original video animation
- Directed by: Various
- Music by: Kōji Makaino
- Studio: Fairy Dust (Note: Production company for all episodes. Animation studio for episodes #3–4, 8–11, 14–15.); A.P.P.P. (Note: Animation studio for episodes #1–2, 5–7, 12–13, 16.)
- Released: August 11, 1984 – February 21, 1987
- Episodes: 16
- Original video animation

Ami Image/Journey
- Music by: Kōji Makaino
- Studio: A.P.P.P.
- Released: December 15, 1985
- Runtime: 25 minutes (Image); 40 minutes (Journey)
- Episodes: 2
- Original video animation

New Cream Lemon
- Directed by: Various
- Music by: Kōji Makaino
- Studio: AIC
- Released: March 21, 1987 – March 21, 1988
- Episodes: 9
- Original video animation

Cream Lemon Special
- Directed by: Yasunori Ide (#1); Kazuya Miyazaki (#2–3)
- Music by: Kōji Makaino
- Studio: Fairy Dust (Note: Episode #1 only.); Studio Loft (Note: Episodes #2–3.)
- Released: June 25, 1987 – March 19, 1993
- Episodes: 3
- Original video animation

Anniversary Commemoration Special Chapters
- Music by: Kōji Makaino
- Studio: Fairy Dust; A.P.P.P.
- Released: November 1987 – June 1988
- Episodes: 2
- Original video animation

Ami: From Then On
- Directed by: Various
- Music by: Kōji Makaino
- Studio: Fairy Dust
- Released: October 21, 1988 – May 21, 1990
- Episodes: 4
- Original video animation

Manga Artist Series
- Directed by: Various
- Music by: Kōji Makaino
- Studio: Fairy Dust
- Released: September 1, 1989 – January 21, 1990
- Episodes: 4
- Original video animation

New Century Cream Lemon
- Directed by: Keitaro Motonaga
- Produced by: Mamoto Yamazaki
- Written by: Toshizo Nemoto
- Music by: Noriyasu Agematsu
- Studio: Studio Dolphin Night
- Released: July 27, 2001 – August 23, 2002
- Episodes: 2
- Original video animation

Cream Lemon: New Generation
- Directed by: Naruyo Takahashi
- Produced by: Hiroshi Negishi
- Written by: Takamitsu Kouno; Masaharu Amiya
- Music by: Kazuya Nishioka
- Studio: Mobanimation
- Released: March 23, 2006 – May 31, 2006
- Episodes: 4

Cream Lemon (くりいむレモン or くりぃむレモン, Kurīmu Remon) is an early hentai series. The first Cream Lemon OVA was released in August 1984, though Cream Lemon was not the first hentai OVA. The first was Lolita Anime, released earlier in February 1984. Patrick W. Galbraith writes that Cream Lemon "was by far the longest running and most influential" hentai series in the 1980s and "laid the foundation for pornographic animation in Japan".

Related to Cream Lemon is the Project A-ko franchise, which was meant to be the third installment of Cream Lemon but changed during production to be a mainstream film. The only remaining indication is the bath scene with B-ko. Adult entertainment company Excalibur Films dubbed, edited, and released in English five Cream Lemon OVAs as parts two and three of their three-volume Brothers Grime X-Rated Cartoons series in 1987 and 1989. In 1987, Brazilian distributor Everest Video licensed the series and released much of it on VHS, in uncensored form.

== Plot ==
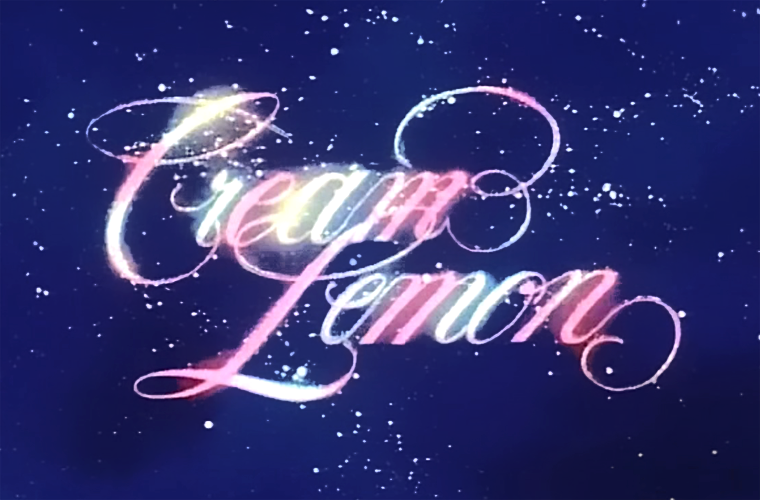
Cream Lemon series logo

Cream Lemon is a collection of sometimes surreal stories having different settings and situations, with genres including fantasy, comedy, suspense, sci-fi, action, drama, mecha, magical girl, horror, and mystery. The overriding theme of the series is sex of almost any kind imaginable. Most chapters stand alone as separate titles, having no relation to any other stories within the Cream Lemon series. The main recurring character is Ami Nonomura, who has an incestuous relationship with her step-brother Hiroshi.

Cream Lemon often focuses on unrealistic and exaggerated sexual themes. One example is the story of a teenage girl who does not like having sex because of a series of rapes in her family. To cure this, the school counselor orders her to strip in front of the art class and masturbate herself to the point of orgasm. She then has public sex with a boy and likes it, causing the whole class to start having sex. Many others are similarly surreal.

== Media ==
=== Cream Lemon ===
No.	Title	Original release date
1	"Cream Lemon Part 1: Be My Baby"; Transliteration: "Kurīmu Remon Part 1: Bī Mai Baby" (Japanese: くりいむレモン PART1 媚・妹・BABY)	August 11, 1984
Ami Nonomura is a schoolgirl in love with her step-brother Hiroshi. While Ami's mother is away on a business trip, Hiroshi gets close to Ami and they have sex for the first time.
2	"Cream Lemon Part 2: Escalation ~Tonight is Hardcore~"; Transliteration: "Kurīmu Remon Part 2: Esukarēshon ~Konya wa Hādokoa~" (Japanese: くりいむレモン PART2 エスカレーション 〜今夜はハードコア〜)	September 10, 1984
Rie Komatsuzaki is enrolled in a prestigious Catholic school and moves into its dorms. One night, Rie's upperclassmen Midori and Naomi initiate her into their lesbian S&M orgies.
3	"Cream Lemon Part 3: SF Super-Dimension Legend Rall"; Transliteration: "Kurīmu Remon Part 3: SF Chōjigen Densetsu Rall" (Japanese: くりいむレモン PART3 SF・超次元伝説RALL)	December 3, 1984
An evil witch named Ramorue wants to take over the Earth. He invades the planet Rall and abducts its princess in order to obtain a legendary sword called Reverse. The warrior girl Caron fights to rescue the princess. Excalibur Films dubbed this episode in English in 1987, re-titling it "Offenders of the Universe". It was released as the first segment of Brothers Grime X-Rated Cartoons Vol. 2.
4	"Cream Lemon Part 4: Pop Chaser"; Transliteration: "Kurīmu Remon Part 4: POP CHASER" (Japanese: くりいむレモン PART4 POP CHASER)	March 13, 1985
A gang of bandits led by the road warrior Zack terrorize a small frontier town. Rio, a motorcycle-riding bounty hunter, visits the town and is shocked to see the only open saloon is staffed entirely by waitresses in sailor fuku. Rio has an intimate encounter with a waitress named Mai. The next morning, Zack and his gang kidnap the waitresses including Mai and it is up to Rio to rescue them.
5	"Cream Lemon Part 5: Ami Again"; Transliteration: "Kurīmu Remon Part 5: Ami AGAIN" (Japanese: くりいむレモン PART5 亜美・AGAIN)	April 10, 1985
Ami's stepmother sends Hiroshi to study abroad in London after catching them having sex. Three months later, Ami falls into a deep depression, so her friends take her to a night club where she is seduced by the callous playboy Kōno.
6	"Cream Lemon Part 6: Escalation 2 ~Forbidden Sonata~"; Transliteration: "Kurīmu Remon Part 6: Esukarēshon 2 ~Kindan no Sonata~" (Japanese: くりいむレモン PART6 エスカレーション2 〜禁断のソナタ〜)	May 25, 1985
Naomi graduates from Catholic school and invites Rie and Midori to her villa afterwards, where the orgies continue.
7	"Cream Lemon Part 7: Don't Do It, Mako-chan - Mako Sexy Symphony Part 1"; Transliteration: "Kurīmu Remon Part 7: Ikenai Mako-chan - MAKO Sekushī Shinfonī Zenpen" (Japanese: くりいむレモン PART7 いけないマコちゃん MAKO・セクシーシンフォニー前編 (Note: Direction and character designs by Toshiki Hirano (credited as "Hiro Hira"). His wife, Narumi Kakinouchi (credited as "Ajimi"/"Mimi Makunouchi"), was the animation director for this episode.))	July 12, 1985
Repressed schoolgirl Mako is awakened to her sexual feelings by a strange little girl named Free.
8	"Cream Lemon Part 8: Super Virgin"; Transliteration: "Kurīmu Remon Part 8: Sūpā Bājin" (Japanese: くりいむレモン PART8 スーパーバージン)	September 10, 1985
The Super Virgin Groupies are a group of man-hating high school girls with psychic powers. Their opposition is a group of lecherous boys who also have psychic powers. Trouble arises when one girl from the Groupies and one of the boys fall in love and diverge from their friends.
9	"Cream Lemon Part 9: Happening Summer"; Transliteration: "Kurīmu Remon Part 9: Hapuningu Samā" (Japanese: くりいむレモン PART9 ハプニング・サマー)	October 20, 1985
A love triangle between precocious schoolgirl Yuki, her next door neighbor Kōji, and her older sister's predatory boyfriend Akira.
10	"Cream Lemon Part 10: Star Trap"; Transliteration: "Kurīmu Remon Part 10: STAR TRAP" (Japanese: くりいむレモン PART10 STAR TRAP)	December 25, 1985
Kanata and Lan are space cops and lovers who get in and out of wacky galactic misadventures. Kanata can shapeshift while Lan has super-strength. Excalibur Films dubbed this episode in English in 1987. It was released as part 2 of Brothers Grime X-Rated Cartoons Vol. 2.
11	"Cream Lemon Part 11: Black Cat Manor"; Transliteration: "Kurīmu Remon Part 11: Kuroneko Kan" (Japanese: くりいむレモン PART11 黒猫館)	January 25, 1986
After answering a newspaper advertisement, young student Murakami spends obscene days in Black Cat Manor with its mistress Reiko, her daughter Arisa, and their maid Aya. The events of this episode are set shortly before the attack on Pearl Harbor.
12	"Cream Lemon Part 12: Don't Do It, Mako-chan - Mako Sexy Symphony Part 2"; Transliteration: "Kurīmu Remon Part 12: Ikenai Mako-chan - MAKO Sekushī Shinfonī Kōhen" (Japanese: くりいむレモン PART12 いけないマコちゃん MAKO・セクシーシンフォニー後編)	February 25, 1986
Under Free's influence, Mako acts strange and amorous. Free appears as a grown woman and attempts to possess Mako. Free's opposite, named Repress, fights to stop her with the help of Mako's boyfriend Kōji.
13	"Cream Lemon Part 13: Ami III"; Transliteration: "Kurīmu Remon Part 13: Ami III" (Japanese: くりいむレモン PART13 亜美III)	May 25, 1986
Hiroshi meets Ami again while visiting Japan during his study break. He tells her they cannot be lovers, and the distraught Ami once again seeks Kōno's company.
14	"Cream Lemon Part 14: Nalice Scramble"; Transliteration: "Kurīmu Remon Part 14: Nalice Scramble" (Japanese: くりいむレモン PART14 なりすスクランブル)	August 5, 1986
Nalice goes to a gender-segregated private Academy, of which her father is the Principal. Whenever there is an alert, Nalice must fight evildoers in a mecha power suit. A Nazi schoolgirl with heavy artillery tries to take over the school and Nalice must defeat her.
15	"Cream Lemon Part 15: Super-Dimension Legend Rall 2 ~Ramorue's Counterattack~"; Transliteration: "Kurīmu Remon Part 15: Chōjigen Densetsu Rall II ~Ramō Rū no Gyakushū~" (Japanese: くりいむレモン PART15 超次元伝説RALL II 〜ラモー・ルーの逆襲〜)	December 5, 1986
The resurrected Ramorue tries to take over Rall again.
16	"Cream Lemon Part 16: Escalation 3 ~Angels' Epilogue~"; Transliteration: "Kurīmu Remon Part 16: Esukarēshon 3 ~Tenshi-tachi no Epirōgu~" (Japanese: くりいむレモン PART16 エスカレーション3 〜天使たちのエピローグ〜)	February 21, 1987
Rie is about to graduate from Catholic School. A plucky new student named Alice begins to flirt with Rie, so Rie and Midori initiate Alice into the orgies with Naomi.

=== Cream Lemon Omnibus ===
No.	Title	Original release date
Omnibus	"Cream Lemon Ami Omnibus: Ami - Youth Gravity"; Transliteration: "Kurīmu Remon Ami Sōshūhen: Ami - Seishun Gurafuti" (Japanese: くりいむレモン亜美総集編 亜美・青春グラフティ)	January 1986
Compilation of the first three Ami episodes.
Omnibus	"Cream Lemon: Don't Do It, Mako-chan - Mako Sexy Symphony Omnibus"; Transliteration: "Kurīmu Remon: Ikenai Mako-chan - MAKO Sekushī Shinfonī Sōshūhen" (Japanese: くりいむレモン いけないマコちゃん MAKO・セクシーシンフォニー総集編)	June 1, 1987
Compilation of the two Mako episodes.
Omnibus	"Cream Lemon: Escalation Omnibus"; Transliteration: "Kurīmu Remon: Esukarēshon Sōshūhen" (Japanese: くりいむレモン エスカレーション総集編)	April 25, 1988
Compilation of the first three Escalation episodes.
Omnibus	"Cream Lemon: Festival - Tō Moriyama Masterpiece Selection"; Transliteration: "Kurīmu Remon: Fesutibaru - Moriyama Tō Kessaku-sen" (Japanese: くりいむレモン フェスティバル 森山塔傑作選)	August 1992
Compilation of the three episodes written and directed by manga artist Tō Moriyama.

=== New Cream Lemon ===
No.	Title	Original release date
1	"Cream Lemon: Tō Moriyama Guest Special - Five Hour Venus"; Transliteration: "Kurīmu Remon: Moriyama Tō Gesuto Supesharu - 5-Jikanme no Vīnasu" (Japanese: くりいむレモン 森山塔ゲストスペシャル 5時間目のヴィーナス)	March 21, 1987
While performing oral sex on her male lover, an art teacher discovers one of her students performed in a pornographic film and blackmails her to model nude for her art class.
2	"Cream Lemon: White Shadow"; Transliteration: "Kurīmu Remon: Howaito Shadō" (Japanese: くりいむレモン ホワイト・シャドウ)	April 15, 1987
A story of pleasure and horror, where the heroine Mami (parodying Hikari Kamiji from Hikari no Densetsu) who devotes herself to rhythmic gymnastics and her two classmates are affected by a mysterious pendant. Excalibur Films dubbed this episode in English and released it as part 2 ("The Black Widow") of Pandora... An Erotic Trilogy.
3	"Cream Lemon: Demon Doll"; Transliteration: "Kurīmu Remon: Ma Ningyō" (Japanese: くりいむレモン 魔人形)	May 1, 1987
A boy is spirited away to a world of fantastic sensuality guided by his sister's classmate who had gone missing for five years. Excalibur Films dubbed this episode in English and released it as part 3 ("Living Shadows") of Pandora... An Erotic Trilogy.
4	"Cream Lemon: E-tude ~Snow Heartbeat~"; Transliteration: "Kurīmu Remon: e-tude ~Yuki no Kodō~" (Japanese: くりいむレモン e・tude 〜雪の鼓動〜)	June 21, 1987
The tragic life and love of a frail teenage pianist named Yurika who suffers from heart problems.
5	"Cream Lemon: Dream-Colored Bunny"; Transliteration: "Kurīmu Remon: Yumeiro BUNNY" (Japanese: くりいむレモン ゆめいろBUNNY)	July 1, 1987
A rabbit girl is accidentally bought from a humanoid pet shop by a lecherous boy, but he treats her well and names her Milk. The boy tries to find a girlfriend, while Milk develops romantic feelings for her "owner".
6	"Cream Lemon: Summer Wind"; Transliteration: "Kurīmu Remon: Samā Windo" (Japanese: くりいむレモン サマーウィンド)	July 30, 1987
Yō is a motorcyclist visiting a seaside town in the summertime. He meets a mysterious girl named Mina and the two begin a passionate relationship.
7	"Cream Lemon: Couple's Heartbreak Live"; Transliteration: "Kurīmu Remon: Futari no Hātobureiku Raibu" (Japanese: くりいむレモン 二人のハートブレイクライブ)	December 26, 1987
Ruri is a young schoolgirl with a huge crush on her teenage family friend, and she becomes envious of his crush on a pop singer. One night, an alien named Kidd crash-lands in her room and possesses one of Ruri's plush dolls, and offers to grant Ruri a wish. Ruri gains the power to transform herself into the body of a grown woman who looks identical to the pop singer.
8	"Cream Lemon: E-tude II ~Early Spring Concerto~"; Transliteration: "Kurīmu Remon: e-tude II ~Sōshun Koncheruto~" (Japanese: くりいむレモン e・tudeII 〜早春コンチェルト〜)	January 21, 1988
After her boyfriend leaves her, Yurika tries to cope with loneliness and advances from strange men.
9	"Cream Lemon: Tō Moriyama Special II - After School XXX"; Transliteration: "Kurīmu Remon: Moriyama Tō Supesharu II - Hōkago XXX" (Japanese: くりいむレモン 森山塔スペシャルII 放課後×××)	March 21, 1988
Asuka becomes a victim of blackmail and must serve her blackmailer's perverted whims.

=== Ami: From Then On ===
The Ami: From Then On OVAs are an alternate ending to the Ami series, replacing the 1986 theatrical short film Going on a Journey: Ami Final Chapter.

No.	Title	Original release date
1	"Cream Lemon: Ami - From Then On Part 1 ~In Sadness~"; Transliteration: "Kurīmu Remon: Ami - Sorekara Dai 1-bu ~Kanashimi no Naka de~" (Japanese: くりいむレモン 亜美・それから 第1部 〜哀しみの中で〜)	October 21, 1988
Three years after "Ami III", Ami prepares to hold her first concert. She is enthusiastic, but her heart is still dominated by thoughts of her step-brother, Hiroshi.
2	"Cream Lemon: Ami - From Then On Part 2 ~I Want to Forget~"; Transliteration: "Kurīmu Remon: Ami - Sorekara Dai 2-bu ~Wasuretai no ni~" (Japanese: くりいむレモン 亜美・それから 第2部 〜忘れたいのに〜)	February 3, 1989
After learning that Hiroshi is getting married, Ami wants to cancel her concert, but Kōno, who is her new producer, orders her to continue.
3	"Cream Lemon: Ami - From Then On Part 3 ~I Want to be Held~"; Transliteration: "Kurīmu Remon: Ami - Sorekara Dai 3-bu ~Dakaretai no ni~" (Japanese: くりいむレモン 亜美・それから 第3部 〜抱かれたいのに〜)	June 21, 1989
Kōno proposes to Ami to get married after the concert, and following a meeting with Hiroshi, she accepts.
4	"Cream Lemon: Ami - From Then On Part 4 Finale ~In a Smile~"; Transliteration: "Kurīmu Remon: Ami - Sorekara Dai 4-bu ~Hohoemi no Naka de~" (Japanese: くりいむレモン 亜美・それから 第4部 完結編 〜微笑みの中で〜)	May 21, 1990
During the concert, Ami sorts out her feelings, and afterwards makes a decision about her life.

=== Manga Artist Series ===
Due to the moral panic after the arrest of Tsutomu Miyazaki, three episodes of this series besides "Magic City Astalot" had sex scenes removed and were released as "The VHS Series". Later, the uncensored works were released as "full versions".

No.	Title	Original release date
1	"Cream Lemon: Magic City Astalot (Note: Directed by Kei Kazuna, who also directed "SF Super-Dimension Legend Rall" and "Star Trap".)"; Transliteration: "Kurīmu Remon: Madō Toshi Asutaroto" (Japanese: くりいむレモン 魔道都市アスタロト)	September 1, 1989
Long ago, demons invaded Earth. Elves used magic to seal away the Demon Lord, but evil is still leaking through. It is up to Mel, the last surviving elf, to get rid of the demons once and for all. "Magic City Astalot" was planned to have a sequel, but it was cancelled due to public backlash from the Miyazaki case.
2	"Cream Lemon: Toshiki Yui Best Hit - Impressions of Europe (Note: Adapted from Toshiki Yui's Mermaid Junction.)"; Transliteration: "Kurīmu Remon: Yui Toshiki Besuto Hitto - Yōroppa no Inshō" (Japanese: くりいむレモン 唯登詩樹ベストヒット ヨーロッパの印象)	December 1, 1989; June 21, 1990 (full version)
The heroine, who is sightseeing in Europe, falls victim to various strange calamities.
3	"Cream Lemon: Kei Amagi Best Hit - Cherry Melancholy"; Transliteration: "Kurīmu Remon: Amagi Kei Besuto Hitto - Cherī na Yūtsu" (Japanese: くりいむレモン 亜麻木硅ベストヒット チェリーなゆううつ)	January 21, 1990; July 21, 1990 (full version)
Masahiko and Tomomi failed consummating their first sexual experience, so they receive an introduction to sex from their upperclassmen.
4	"Cream Lemon: Tō Moriyama Best Hit - It May Be So"; Transliteration: "Kurīmu Remon: Moriyama Tō Besuto Hitto - Sōka Mo Shin'nai" (Japanese: くりいむレモン 森山塔ベストヒット そうかもしんない)	January 21, 1990; August 21, 1990 (full version)
A teenage boy finds a loaded handgun in a park and uses it to rape women and threaten people into performing sexual acts.

=== Cream Lemon Special ===
No.	Title	Original release date
1	"Cream Lemon Special: Dark"; Transliteration: "Kurīmu Remon Supesharu: DARK" (Japanese: くりいむレモンスペシャル DARK)	June 25, 1987
Neal, a traveling painter, and Ned, a seminarian, have to spend the night in a mysterious castle. Excalibur Films dubbed this episode in English and released it as part 1 ("The Dark Forest") of Pandora... An Erotic Trilogy.
2	"Cream Lemon Special: Young Love - Angie & Rose"; Transliteration: "Kurīmu Remon Supesharu: Aoi Sei Anje & Rōzu" (Japanese: くりいむレモンスペシャル 青性アンジェ&ローズ)	July 17, 1992
Toshiya travels to Canada and meets his uncle's family, including his beautiful aunt Rose and his cousin Angie.
3	"Cream Lemon Special: Return to Black Cat Manor"; Transliteration: "Kurīmu Remon Supesharu: Zoku Kuroneko Kan" (Japanese: くりいむレモンスペシャル 続黒猫館)	March 19, 1993
Thirty years after his shocking experience there, Murakami returns to Black Cat Manor, again answering a newspaper advert.

=== Anniversary Specials ===
No.	Title	Original release date
1	"Cream Lemon 3rd Anniversary Commemoration Special: Graduation Album - Cream Lemon Best Scenes Collection"; Transliteration: "Kurīmu Remon Sanshūnen Kinen Supesharu: Sotsugyō Arubamu - Kurīmu Remon Mei Bamen-shū" (Japanese: くりいむレモン3周年記念スペシャル 卒業アルバム くりいむレモン名場面集)	November 1987
Compilation of erotic scenes from the first three years of Cream Lemon, with some new footage.
2	"Cream Lemon 4th Anniversary Commemoration Special: Cream Lemon Part.0"; Transliteration: "Kurīmu Remon Yonshūnen Kinen Supesharu: Kurīmu Remon Part Zero" (Japanese: くりいむレモン4周年記念スペシャル くりぃむレモンPart.0)	June 1988
This special contains the sex scenes from parts 1 and 2.

=== New Century Cream Lemon ===
After eight years, the first in a brief new age of Cream Lemon OVAs made its appearance, with another following the year after. The episodes are connected to the "Escalation" and "Ami" series.

No.	Title	Original release date
1	"New Century Cream Lemon: Escalation - Die Liebe"; Transliteration: "Shin Seiki Kurīmu Remon: Esukarēshon - Die Liebe" (Japanese: 新世紀くりいむレモン エスカレーション Die Liebe)	July 27, 2001
An alternate ending to the original Escalation series. Tomoe is a new student at the Catholic school. She attempts to run away from the dormitory, but is saved from being caught by her upperclassman Rie. The girls begin to closely bond, and Tomoe finds herself being initiated into S&M sessions with Rie, Midori, and Naomi.
2	"New Century Cream Lemon: Ami Rencontrer"; Transliteration: "Shin Seiki Kurīmu Remon: Ami RENCONTRER" (Japanese: 新世紀くりいむレモン 亜美 RENCONTRER)	August 23, 2002
Ami begins a sexual relationship with her step-brother, Hiroshi. The relationship between the two becomes known to her stepmother, and Ami is separated from Hiroshi, who is sent to study in London. The vulnerable Ami later attracts the attention of Mr. Kinoshita, a handsome new substitute teacher at her school. "Ami Rencontrer" is an alternative sequel to the first two Ami episodes from the original Cream Lemon series, "Be My Baby" and "Ami Again".

=== Non-pornographic animation ===
A music video, Ami Image: White Shadow, as well as a feature film, Going on a Journey: Ami Final Chapter, were released in 1985 and 1986, respectively. Ami Final Chapter was screened as a double feature alongside Project A-ko. They were bundled onto a single LaserDisc set released by Pony Canyon on September 21, 1986.

An OVA series titled Cream Lemon: New Generation was released in 2006.

==== Ami Image/Journey ====
No.	Title	Original release date
SP1	"Ami Image: White Shadow"; Transliteration: "Ami Imāju – Shiroi Kage" (Japanese: 亜美・イマージュ ー白い影ー)	December 15, 1985
A music video depicting Ami being scouted and debuting as an idol singer and model. Takes place chronologically between "Ami Again" and "Ami III".
SP2	"Going on a Journey: Ami Final Chapter"; Transliteration: "Tabidachi – Ami Shūshō" (Japanese: 旅立ち ー亜美・終章ー)	June 21, 1986
After debuting as an idol singer and model, Ami ponders her future and her relationships with Kōno, Hiroshi, and her step-mother.

==== Cream Lemon: New Generation ====
No.	Title	Original release date
1	"Cream Lemon: New Generation Vol. 1: Ami Part 1 - I My Me"; Transliteration: "Kurīmu Remon: New Generation Vol. 1: Ami Zenpen - I Mai Mi" (Japanese: くりいむレモン New Generation vol.1 亜美 前編 I･妹･美)	March 23, 2006
Ami is bullied at school, but is protected by her stepbrother Takashi, an aspiring rock musician.
2	"Cream Lemon: New Generation Vol. 2: Instant Beauties for Every Taste"; Transliteration: "Kurīmu Remon: New Generation Vol. 2: Retoruto Bijo Hakkei" (Japanese: くりいむレモン New Generation vol.2 レトルト美女八景)	March 23, 2006
Student Ken buys three defective artificial girlfriends, which complicates his relationship with his beautiful neighbor Sora.
3	"Cream Lemon: New Generation Vol. 3: Ami Part 2 - Once More..."; Transliteration: "Kurīmu Remon: New Generation Vol. 3: Ami Kōhen - Mōichido..." (Japanese: くりいむレモン New Generation vol.3 亜美 後編 もういちど･･･)	May 31, 2006
After their parents divorce and Takashi moves to another country, lonely Ami joins an internet forum about forbidden love.
4	"Cream Lemon: New Generation Vol. 4: Creature Buster"; Transliteration: "Kurīmu Remon: New Generation Vol. 4: Kurīchā Basutā" (Japanese: くりいむレモン New Generation vol.4 クリーチャーバスター)	May 31, 2006
Yusuke is a monster hunter who must confront monsters infesting his school.

=== Live-action ===
In March 1997, a live-action video based on the Escalation series was released under the title Cream Lemon Escalation: Angel Wings.

A romantic live action film titled Cream Lemon, loosely based on the Ami series, was released in Japanese theaters on September 25, 2004. It was directed by Nobuhiro Yamashita, with Chiharu Muraishi as Ami and Kenji Mizuhashi as Hiroshi.

A nine-episode erotic V-Cinema (direct-to-video) series, Cream Lemon Label, focusing on forbidden brother-sister relationships, was released from September 16, 2005, to March 28, 2008, with the last episode also being released in theaters on February 23, 2008.

No.	Title	Original release date
Special	"Cream Lemon Escalation: Angel Wings"; Transliteration: "Kurīmu Remon: Esukarēshon ~Tenshi no Tsubasa~" (Japanese: くりいむレモン エスカレーション 天使の翼)	March 21, 1997
In the dormitory of an all-girls' Catholic school, the students explore their sexuality through lesbian S&M orgies.
Film	"Cream Lemon"; Transliteration: "Kurīmu Remon" (Japanese: くりいむレモン)	September 25, 2004 (theatrical); November 26, 2004 (home video)
17-year-old high school girl Ami Nonomura and her 20-year-old brother Hiroshi have a secret they cannot reveal to their parents or even their best friends.
1	"Cream Lemon: Ami's Diary"; Transliteration: "Kurīmu Remon: Ami no Nikki" (Japanese: くりいむレモン 亜美の日記)	September 16, 2005 (rental); September 23, 2005 (retail)
On her 18th birthday, Ami Nonomura wants to meet her father and brother who live far away. While searching for her brother's house, she is attacked by a thief, but is rescued by Hiroshi Tazaki. They fall in love but discover they are actually siblings.
2	"Cream Lemon: Shape of Bud"; Transliteration: "Kurīmu Remon: Tsubomi no Katachi" (Japanese: くりいむレモン 蕾のかたち)	January 27, 2006
17-year-old high school girl Ami Nonomura and her older brother Hiroshi, a photographer, are drawn into a sexual relationship.
3	"Cream Lemon: After the Dream"; Transliteration: "Kurīmu Remon: Yumenoato ni" (Japanese: くりいむレモン 夢のあとに)	April 21, 2006
Ami Nonomura and her brother Hiroshi's parents die suddenly. A year later, Ami is living with Hiroshi and his wife Mariko. They look like a happy family at first glance, but there is tension after Mariko grows suspicious of Ami and Hiroshi's relationship.
4	"Cream Lemon: Another Day of Ami"; Transliteration: "Kurīmu Remon: Matanohi no Ami" (Japanese: くりいむレモン またの日の亜美)	July 21, 2006
Ami Nonomura lives with her aunt, taking care of her half-brother Hiroshi. Hiroshi has become mentally unstable after the death of his sister Mami, but gradually recovers with Ami's help. One day, Ami learns Mami and Hiroshi had a forbidden love affair, culminating in Mami getting pregnant and committing suicide.
5	"Cream Lemon: Poolside Ami"; Transliteration: "Kurīmu Remon: Pūrusaido no Ami" (Japanese: くりいむレモン プールサイドの亜美)	October 27, 2006
High school girl Ami Nonomura, who was raised in China and excels in swimming, returns to Japan due to her mother's remarriage and meets her new step-brother Hiroshi, a stupid layabout with a penchant for voyeurism.
6	"Cream Lemon: Black Cat Manor"; Transliteration: "Kurīmu Remon: Kuroneko Kan" (Japanese: くりいむレモン 黒猫館)	January 26, 2007
16-year-old Arisa reunites with her half-brother Masaki, a college student, for the first time in three years. She lives with her mother Reiko and their maid Aya. A complicated relationship unfolds between the four.
7	"Cream Lemon: Demon Doll"; Transliteration: "Kurīmu Remon: Ma Ningyō" (Japanese: くりいむレモン 魔人形)	April 27, 2007
A genius AI scientist, expelled from academic society, secretly continues his research to revive his brain-dead younger sister.
8	"Cream Lemon - Don't Do It, Mako-chan"; Transliteration: "Kurīmu Remon: Ikenai Mako-chan" (Japanese: くりいむレモン いけないマコちゃん)	October 26, 2007
Mako, an aspiring manga author who has no romantic experience and cannot draw a realistic depiction of sex, begins writing a story to win a rookie award, but feels the limits of her talent. Nene, an exchange student living at Mako's house, makes her an offer: "Let's practice".
9	"Cream Lemon: End of Journey"; Transliteration: "Kurīmu Remon: Tabi no Owari" (Japanese: くりいむレモン 旅のおわり)	February 23, 2008 (theatrical); March 28, 2008 (home video)
High school girl Aya comes to Tokyo from Nagano on a field trip. During her free time she visits her step-brother who was separated from her after their parents' divorce. Aya feels conflicted by her feelings about him even though she already has a boyfriend.

=== Video games ===
Title	Platform	Publisher(s)	Release date
Star Trap (スタートラップ, Sutā Torappu)	PC-8801 mkII SR	JAST	January 26, 1986
Star Trap (スタートラップ, Sutā Torappu)	PC-9801 VM	JAST	January 26, 1986
Star Trap (スタートラップ, Sutā Torappu)	FM-7	JAST	January 26, 1986
Star Trap (スタートラップ, Sutā Torappu)	MSX	JAST	January 26, 1986
Cream Lemon: Superdimension SF Legend Rall (くりぃむレモン SF・超次元伝説ラル, Kurīmu Remon: SF Chōjigen Densetsu Raru)	FM-7	Pony Canyon	April 1987
Black Cat Manor (黒猫館, Kuro Neko Kan)	PC-9801 VM	Fairy Dust	July 9, 1993
Black Cat Manor (黒猫館, Kuro Neko Kan)	Windows 3.1	Fairy Dust	March 1995
Black Cat Manor (黒猫館, Kuro Neko Kan)	Mac	Fairy Dust	March 1995
Ami ~Wind Rises~ (亜美〜風立ちぬ〜, Ami ~Kazetachinu~)	PC-9801 VM	Fairy Dust	June 24, 1994
Rall III: Awakening Chapter (ラルIII 覚醒編, Raru III: Kakusei Hen)	PC-9801 VM	Fairy Dust	October 17, 1994
Escalation '95 ~May I Call Big Sister?~ (エスカレーション'95 〜お姉さまって呼んでいいですか？〜, Esukarēshon' 95 ~Onēsamatte Yon de Ī desu ka?~)	PC-9801 VM	Fairy Dust	March 4, 1995
Tō Moriyama Special: 5th Hour Venus (森山塔スペシャル 5時間目のヴィーナス, Moriyama Tō Supesharu: 5-jikanme no Vīnasu)	PC-9801 VM	Fairy Dust	April 7, 1995
Ami: Love Letter (亜美 Love Letter, Ami: Love Letter)	Windows 3.1	Fairy Dust	August 1995
Ami: Love Letter (亜美 Love Letter, Ami: Love Letter)	Mac	Fairy Dust	August 1995
Ami: Love Letter (亜美 Love Letter, Ami: Love Letter)	Windows 95	Fairy Dust	June 1996
Virgin^{2}: The Blooming Girls' AVG (ヴァージン^{2} 花ひらく少女たちの AVG, Vuājin^{2}: Hanahiraku Shōjo-tachi no AVG)	PC-9801 VM	Fairy Dust	September 1, 1995
Ami: Exciting PC Princess (亜美 ときめきパソコンプリンセス, Ami: Tokimeki Pasokon Purinsesu)	Windows 95	Fairy Dust	March 1996
Ami: Exciting PC Princess (亜美 ときめきパソコンプリンセス, Ami: Tokimeki Pasokon Purinsesu)	Mac	Fairy Dust	March 1996
Red Crystal Eyes (赤い水晶の瞳, Akai Suishō no Hitomi)	PC-9801 VM	Fairy Dust	March 29, 1996
Evil Doll (魔人形, Ma Ningyō)	PC-9801 VM	Fairy Dust	September 13, 1996
Evil Doll (魔人形, Ma Ningyō)	Windows 95	Fairy Dust	September 13, 1996
Escalation Extension (エスカレーション エクステンション, Esukarēshon Ekusutenshon)	Windows 3.1	Fairy Dust	October 1996
Escalation Extension (エスカレーション エクステンション, Esukarēshon Ekusutenshon)	Mac	Fairy Dust	October 1996
Ami ~Heartbroken Angel~ (亜美〜傷心の天使〜, Ami ~Shōshin no Tenshi~)	Windows 95	Fairy Dust	June 1997
Escalation ~Blue Embrace~ (エスカレーション 〜蒼い抱擁〜, Esukarēshon ~Aoi Hōyō~)	Windows 95/98	Fairy Dust	June 1999
Escalation -HARD CORE- (エスカレーション-HARD CORE-, Esukarēshon -HARD CORE-)	Windows 95/98	Fairy Dust	June 2002
Cream Lemon: FourSeasons (くりいむレモン FourSeasons, Kurīmu Remon FourSeasons)	DMM.com	Fairy Dust	July 1, 2014

=== Re-releases ===
Green Bunny distributed the Cream Lemon OVAs across eighteen DVD sets from October 25, 1999, to August 25, 2000. AMG Entertainment released a single DVD box set on April 20, 2007.

== Voice actors ==
Ami series

- Hitomi Oikawa as Ami Nonomura
- Nobuo Tobita as Hiroshi Nonomura
- Natsumi Sasaki as Satomi Kudō
- Arisa Andō as Kyōko Terasawa
- Narumi Tsunoda as Yasuko Nonomura & Kyōko Hori
- Kōichi Hashimoto as Ryūji Kōno

Escalation series

- Narumi Tsunoda as Naomi Hayakawa
- Arisa Andō as Rie Komatsuzaki
- Natsumi Sasaki as Midori Ōmori
- Hitomi Oikawa as Teacher
- Miki Itō as Mari
- Ikuya Sawaki as Naomi's father
- Naoko Matsui as Arisa Kuriki

Rall series

- Sanae Miyuki as Caron
- Daisuke Gōri as Ramorue
- Seiko Nakano as Peruru
- Arisa Andō as Yulia
- Nobuo Tobita as Raike
- Kae Araki as Sara

Pop Chaser

- Yoshiko Sakakibara as Rio
- Makoto Kōsaka (Yoshie Takaishi) as Mai
- Keaton Yamada as Bartender
- Norio Wakamoto as Zack

Mako series

- Mayumi Shō & Miki Itō as Mako Kiryū
- Shigeru Nakahara as Yū
- Masako Miura as Free & Repress
- Hitomi Oikawa as Friend C
- Narumi Tsunoda as Friend

Super Virgin

- Arisa Andō as Mako
- Aya Mizoguchi as Iiya Ōane
- Hiroyuki Shibamoto as Tamaki

Happening Summer

- Hirotaka Suzuoki as Akira
- Maria Kawamura as Keiko
- Naoko Matsui as Yuki
- Minako Arakawa as Etsuko Aoki

Star Trap

- Chieko Honda as Ran
- Sanae Miyuki as Kanata
- Kōichi Hashimoto as Joke Tōgō

Black Cat Manor series

- Arisa Andō as Marisa Ayukawa
- Yuuichi Meguro as Masaki Murakami
- Yoshino Ohtori as Saeko Ayukawa
- Aya Mizoguchi as Aya Ōmuro

Nalice Scramble

- Chieko Honda as Narisu Madogiwa
- Kenichi Ogata as Principal Madogiwa
- Emi Shinohara as Rami Ichimonji
- Aya Mizoguchi as An Koshi & Kyan Hitomi
- Yumi Takada as Seiko Madogiwa

== Reception ==
AVN reviewed volumes two and three of the Brothers Grime X-Rated Cartoons series.
