= Robot Carnival =

1987 anime anthology film

- Promotional release poster

ロボットカーニバル (Robotto Kānibaru)
- Original video animation
- Directed by: Hidetoshi Ōmori; Hiroyuki Kitakubo; Hiroyuki Kitazume; Katsuhiro Otomo; Kōji Morimoto; Mao Lamdo; Takashi Nakamura; Yasuomi Umetsu
- Written by: Hidetoshi Ōmori; Hiroyuki Kitakubo; Hiroyuki Kitazume; Katsuhiro Otomo; Koji Morimoto; Mao Lamdo; Takashi Nakamura; Yasuomi Umetsu
- Music by: Joe Hisaishi; Isaku Fujita; Masahisa Takeichi
- Studio: A.P.P.P.
- Licensed by: Discotek Media
- Released: July 21, 1987
- Runtime: 91 minutes

Robot Carnival (ロボットカーニバル, Robotto Kānibaru) is a Japanese anthology original video animation (OVA) and anime film released in 1987.

The film consists of nine shorts by different well-known directors, many of whom started out as animators with little to no directing experience. Each has a distinctive animation style and story, ranging from comedic to dramatic storylines. The music was composed by Joe Hisaishi and Isaku Fujita and arranged by Joe Hisaishi, Isaku Fujita, and Masahisa Takeichi.

== Segments ==
=== "Opening" / "Ending" ===
The "Opening" (オープニング, Ōpuningu) takes place in a desert. A boy finds a small "coming soon" poster advertising the Robot Carnival, and becomes frightened and agitated. He warns the people in his village, most likely to escape, when a huge machine with many robots performing in niches on its exterior grinds its way right over the village. Once a magnificent traveling showcase, it is now heavily rusted, damaged by decades of weathering in the desert, while its many machines wreak havoc as the village is destroyed beneath its might.

In the "Ending" (エンディング, Endingu) segment (the ninth segment of the OVA), the Robot Carnival is stopped by a dune in the desert. Unable to climb it, the Carnival stalls at its base. As the sun sets over the traveling relic, flashback stills recall the grandeur of the Carnival at the peak of its existence: an unparalleled engine of mirth that brought joy to the various cities it visited. At sunrise, the gigantic machine charges forward with a burst of power, and surmounts the dune. The final push proves to be too much for the aged contraption, and it falls apart. The bulk of the OVA's credits are then shown, followed by an epilogue.

In the epilogue at the end of the credits, set several years later, a man discovers an orb among the remains and brings it back to his family. It is a music box, featuring one of the carnival's robot ballerinas. As it dances, the children applaud. The ballerina finishes its dance with a leap into the air; the explosion that follows destroys the shack where the family lived, leaving "END" in enormous letters lying in its place. The family's pet llama, seemingly the only survivor, struggles to regain its footing.

Staff
- Director / Scenario / Storyboards: Katsuhiro Otomo, Atsuko Fukushima
- Backgrounds: Nizo Yamamoto
- Sound effects: Kazutoshi Satō

=== "Franken's Gears" ===
"Franken's Gears" (フランケンの歯車, Furanken no Haguruma) was directed by Kōji Morimoto. A mad scientist tries to give life to his robot with lightning, just like Victor Frankenstein did. During a vicious thunderstorm, the robot is successfully brought to life, and mimics his creator's every movement. Overjoyed, the scientist dances with glee, trips, and falls. Seeing this, the robot dances, trips, and falls on the scientist, killing him.

Staff
- Director / Scenario / Character designer: Kōji Morimoto
- Backgrounds: Yūji Ikehata
- Sound effects: Kazutoshi Satō

=== "Deprive" ===
In "Deprive", an alien invasion of robot foot soldiers attacks a city and kidnaps people, including a young girl. Her companion, an android, is damaged, but retains her locket. A human with superhuman abilities is then seen and goes through waves of robots before being stopped by two powerful robots. Captured by the alien leader, he is tortured, but it is also revealed to be the android from earlier, now upgraded into a combat android with a human disguise. Defeating the two powerful robots and the alien leader, he rescues the girl. Running through the wasteland carrying her, the girl eventually wakes up and recognizes his new form because of the locket he still has.

Staff
- Director / Scenario / Character designer: Hidetoshi Ōmori
- Backgrounds: Kenji Matsumoto
- Sound effects: Jun'ichi Sasaki

=== "Presence" ===
"Presence" (プレゼンス, Purezensu), one of only two segments featuring intelligible dialogue, tells the story of a man who has an obsession with an automaton he has been secretly constructing in an attempt to compensate for the lack of any close relationship with his wife and family. The setting seems to be British and of the early twentieth century, but also suggests another planet or a future which has attempted to re-establish a former social structure. When the automaton takes on a personality of her own, far beyond what the man had programmed, he smashes her in a fit of panic, and leaves his secret laboratory for what he believes is the last time. Many years later, the man has a vision of his automaton appearing before him, but then blowing up before he can take her hand. He returns to his shed to find the automaton still sitting smashed in a corner, just as she had been left years earlier. Many more years elapse, and the automaton appears again before the man. This time, he takes her hand and walks into the distance with her, before vanishing in front of his shocked wife.

Little of the dialogue is actually spoken on-screen; all but a few lines are given in voice-over, or with the speaker's mouth obscured.

Staff
- Director / Scenario / Character designer: Yasuomi Umetsu
- Animation production assistance: Shinsuke Terasawa, Hideki Nimura
- Backgrounds: Hikaru Yamakawa
- Sound effects: Kenji Mori

Main cast

Character	Japanese	English
Protagonist	Kohji Moritsugu	Michael McConnohie
Girl	Junko Machida	Lisa Michelson
Granny	Keiko Hanagata	Barbara Goodson
Daughter (after marriage)	Kumiko Takizawa	Lara Cody
Daughter (child)	Aya Murata	
Granddaughter	Nariko Fujieda	
Colleague	Hideyuki Umezu	Tom Wyner
Man A	Satoru Inagaki	
Man B	Hideyuki Umezu	
Man C	Ikuya Sawaki	
Child A	Hidehiro Kikuchi	
Child B	Daisuke Namikawa	
Child C	Tatsuhiko Nakamura	
Child D	Hidehiro Kikuchi	
Small Mecha	Kumiko Takizawa	

=== "Star Light Angel" ===
"Star Light Angel" is a bishōjo story featuring two friends – teenage girls – at a robot-themed amusement park. One of the girls finds that her boyfriend is now going out with her friend. Running away in tears, she finds her way to a virtual reality ride. Though pleasant at first, her memory causes the ride to summon a giant laser-breathing mecha. One of the park's robots, actually a human park employee in costume, finds himself in the role of knight in shining armor, allowing her to let go of her darker emotions, and to move forward in her life. The mood of this segment was heavily influenced by the music video for A-ha's "Take On Me".

Note: Some cameos of Akira film characters appear in the background characters

Staff
- Director / Scenario / Character designer: Hiroyuki Kitazume
- Backgrounds: Yui Shimazaki
- Sound effects: Kenji Mori

=== "Cloud" ===
"Cloud" features a robot walking through time, and the evolution of man. The backdrop is animated with clouds that depict various events of the universe, such as the modernization of man as well as the self-destruction of man. Eventually, the same angel who cries for his immortality makes him human towards the end. The animation is done in a scratchboard or rough etching style.

Staff
- Director / Scenario / Character designer / Backgrounds / Key animation: Manabu Ōhashi (as "Mao Lamdo")
- Animation: Hatsune Ōhashi, Shiho Ōhashi
- Sound effects: Swara Pro
- Music: Isaku Fujita

=== "Strange Tales of Meiji Machine Culture: Westerner's Invasion" ===
"Strange Tales of Meiji Machine Culture: Westerner's Invasion" (明治からくり文明奇譚〜紅毛人襲来之巻〜, Meiji Karakuri Bunmei Kitan: Kōmōjin Shūrai no Maki; retitled "A Tale of Two Robots, Chapter 3: Foreign Invasion" for the Streamline dub) is set in the nineteenth century and features two wooden "giant robots", directed from within by a human crew. In the style of a film serial of the sound era, a Westerner in his giant robot attempts to take over Japan, but is challenged by locals operating a "machine made for the parade" – a Japanese giant robot. The style of this segment is somewhat reminiscent of a Japanese World War II-era propaganda film. Despite the title of this segment, there is no known prequel or sequel. The Westerner speaks English in the original release.

Staff
- Director / Scenario: Hiroyuki Kitakubo
- Character designer: Yoshiyuki Sadamoto
- Mechanical designer: Mahiro Maeda
- Animation assistance: Kazuaki Mōri, Yuji Moriyama, Kumiko Kawana
- Backgrounds: Hiroshi Sasaki
- Sound effects: Jun'ichi Sasaki

Cast

Character	Japanese	English
Sankichi	Kei Tomiyama	Bob Bergen (as Kichi)
Yayoi	Chisa Yokoyama	Lisa Michelson (as Yaori)
Fukusuke	Katsue Miwa	Eddie Frierson (as Toki)
Denjirō	Kaneto Shiozawa	Kerrigan Mahan
Daimaru	Toku Nishio	Tom Wyner (as Chubby)
John Jack Volkerson III	James R. Bowers	Steve Kramer (as Jonathan Jameson Volkerson III)

=== "Chicken Man and Red Neck" ===
"Chicken Man and Red Neck" (ニワトリ男と赤い首, Niwatori Otoko to Akaikubi; retitled "Nightmare" for the Streamline dub) is set in the city of Tokyo, overrun by its machines, which have been turned into robots of all shapes and sizes by a robotic magician, the titular Red Neck. They all come alive for a night of revelry, with only a single, drunken human (Chicken Man) awake to witness it. When the sun rises, the robots disappear, and everything is turned back to normal, but Chicken Man awakens to find that the now-restored machines are embedded high up in a set of skyscrapers, while the citizens of Tokyo go about their lives far below.

Staff
- Director / Scenario / Character designer: Takashi Nakamura
- Backgrounds: Hiroshige Sawai
- Sound effects: Junichi Sasaki

== Release ==
The OVA was released in Japan on VHS and LaserDisc on July 21, 1987, through JVC. In the United States, Streamline Pictures producers Carl Macek and Jerry Beck, the latter an animation historian, licensed the OVA and gave it a theatrical premiere in Portland, Oregon on January 25, 1991, with a home video release later in December.

A limited-edition Region 2 DVD of Robot Carnival was released in Japan through Beam Entertainment on November 25, 2000. A Region 1 DVD of Robot Carnival was released in the United States by Discotek Media on September 1, 2015, and a Blu-ray was released on March 27, 2018, and a Ultra HD Blu-ray on December 28, 2021.

=== Streamline Pictures English dub ===
The script for the English-dubbed version of "A Tale of Two Robots" is slightly different from the original Japanese version and even adds a few lines that are not present in the original version. In addition, a passing reference to Japan's 1854 opening to foreign trade is removed and the foreign antagonist's English dialogue is re-recorded.

Some versions of the English-dub of the release by Streamline Pictures shuffled the order of the segments and modified the "Ending" segment by removing the still images of the "Robot Carnival", placing the two animated segments next to each other, and placing all of the credits at the very end of the OVA. The still images of the "Robot Carnival" were most likely removed due to Streamline's practice of removing all onscreen kanji from their anime releases in order to "Americanize" them. Carl Macek stated that the reason for the "shuffling of segments" was due to considerations regarding the theatrical exploitation of the OVA.

The various segments were received separately and then subsequently assembled to fill out 2000 ft reels. In order to keep the actual distribution of the theatrical release in a manageable state, the segments were arranged to minimize reel changes – otherwise, it would have required additional reels (and therefore, additional reel changes) to keep the product in its original order and would have added to the cost of the distribution. The decision was mutually agreed upon between Streamline and A.P.P.P. regarding the credit sequence and the use of still images, as the original production company did not have the proper neutral closing credits required for international distribution available; therefore, it was mutually decided to create this new closing.

== See also ==
- List of animated package films
- Neo Tokyo – an Otomo anthology film from 1987.
- Memories – an Otomo anthology film from 1995.
- Genius Party – anthology films from 2007 and 2008.
- Short Peace – an Otomo anthology film from 2013.
