= Terry Klassen =

Canadian voice actor

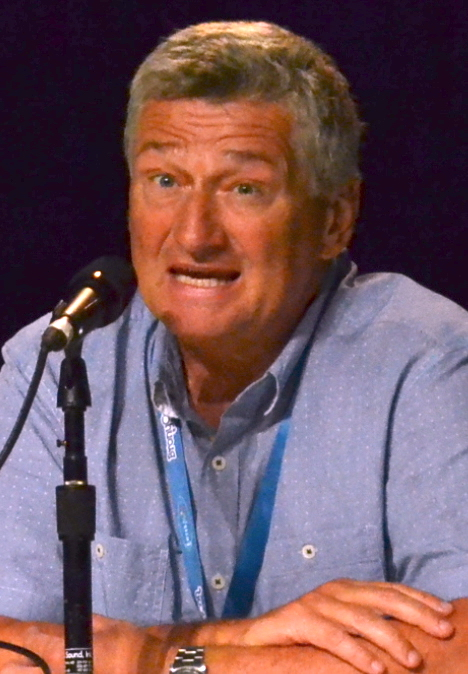
- Klassen at BronyCon in 2014
- Occupations: Voice actor; ADR director; writer
- Years active: 1984–present

Terry Klassen is a Canadian voice actor, ADR director and writer. Before animation, Klassen worked in radio in Winnipeg (CITI-FM), Toronto (Q107), Calgary (CFAC), Portage la Prairie (CFRY) and part-time at CFOX and CFMI. In animation, he is best known for his work on My Little Pony: Friendship Is Magic, being a voice director on all episodes and the Equestria Girls series. Klassen has also voice-directed other shows such as Ed, Edd n Eddy, Johnny Test, Mega Babies and several Barbie films, as well as the English dub of Cardcaptors. Klassen has also voiced many characters for animated films and television series, including Sylvester in Baby Looney Tunes, Tusky Husky in Krypto the Superdog, Tony and Seth Parsons in The Cramp Twins, and Krillin in the Ocean-dubbed version of Dragon Ball Z.

== Career ==
Klassen co-created Yvon of the Yukon. He is the voice director for shows and films including Martha Speaks, Johnny Test, Max Steel, George of the Jungle, Ed, Edd n Eddy, the Barbie franchise, Transformers, Cardcaptors, Salty's Lighthouse, G.I. Joe, Pucca, My Little Pony: Friendship Is Magic, Littlest Pet Shop, Pac-Man and the Ghostly Adventures, and Mega Babies. Klassen also wrote ADR on many Japanese series, such as Dragon Ball Z, and was a story editor on Bakugan. He was nominated for a Daytime Emmy Award for Outstanding Directing in an Animated Program for Martha Speaks.

== Filmography ==
=== Anime ===
- Ayakashi: Samurai Horror Tales - Kohei Kobotoke
- Cybersix - Von Reichter
- Death Note - Coadjuvant Shinigami
- Dragon Ball Z - Krillin, Master Roshi (ep. 108+), Babidi, Guldo, King Vegeta, West Kai, Additional Voices (Ocean Group dub)
- Escaflowne - Mole Man (Ocean Group dub)
- Galaxy Express 999 - The Conductor
- Hamtaro - Jingle
- Inuyasha - Hachi, Kotatsu the Hell Painter
- Key the Metal Idol - Senichi Tamari
- Maison Ikkoku - Sakamoto
- Master Keaton - Colonel Foster
- Mega Man: Upon a Star - Rush
- MegaMan NT Warrior - JunkDataMan
- Mobile Suit Gundam - Quaran, Fed Messenger
- Monkey Magic - Wowzer, Lao Tzu, Minister Fuchin, Sonicmate
- Monster Rancher - Most, Captain Evil Hare, Ed, Ducken, Color Pandora, Jill, Additional Voices
- Powerpuff Girls Z - Mr. Looper (Fruit Shop Merchant)
- Ranma ½ - Hiroshi, Chingensai, various others
- Saber Marionette J - Pinsuke, Additional Voices
- The SoulTaker - Henry
- Transformers: Armada - High Wire, Shaun's Father
- Transformers: Cybertron - Brimstone, Tim Hansen, Stanton
- Transformers: Energon - Skyblast, Six Shot
- The Vision of Escaflowne - Mole Man, Pyle, Teo, Additional Voices (Ocean Group dub)
- Zoids - Billy, Dispatch, Fence
- Zoids Fuzors - Billy, Dispatch, Fence
- Yashahime: Princess Half-Demon - Hachi

=== Animation ===
- Animated Classic Showcase - Several Characters
- The Baby Huey Show - Additional Voices
- Baby Looney Tunes - Baby Sylvester, Baby Pepé
- Baby Looney Tunes' Eggs-traordinary Adventure - Baby Sylvester
- Barbie and the Three Musketeers - Pig, Regent Guard #1, Henchman
- Barbie as Rapunzel - Fat Swordsman / Baker
- Barbie as the Island Princess - Butler, Guard, Horse
- Barbie in a Christmas Carol - Hypnotist / Boz
- Barbie: Mariposa and the Fairy Princess - Skeezite #1
- Beat Bugs - Farmer
- Being Ian - Wally / Nite Show Host / Ian's Report Voiceover / Elderly Tennis Player / Unibrowed Police Officer / Dr. Schmertz / Lonely Ranger
- Billy the Cat - Moonie
- Bob's Broken Sleigh - Puffin Minion 2
- The Bots Master - D'Nerd
- The Brothers Grunt - Additional Voices
- Bucky O'Hare and the Toad Wars! - Rat Produce Merchant, Scarbill, The Newt, Toad Crew Member
- The Cramp Twins - Tony Parsons / Seth Parsons
- Camp Candy - Additional Voices
- Casper's Haunted Christmas - Stinkie
- A Christmas Adventure ...From a Book Called Wisely's Tales - Snow Mobile Rider #2, Bear
- Class of the Titans - Eros / Polyphemus
- Coconut Fred's Fruit Salad Island - Teddy the Bat
- Dragon Tales - The Fury
- D'Myna Leagues - Abe the Ump, Old Gordo, Bicycle Bob, Flatt, Steve Mungo
- Ed, Edd n Eddy's Big Picture Show - Eddy's brother
- Extreme Dinosaurs - Spittor, Argor
- Exosquad
- Fantastic Four: World's Greatest Heroes - Impossible Man
- Fat Dog Mendoza - Texas Harry Longhorn, Precious, Monkey Selling Cookies, Company Employee 1, Swarmy Reporter, Pilot, Ambulance Medic, Mr. Omnipotent, Betting Spaniard, Lenny the Ham Man, Young Nerd
- Firehouse Tales - Additional Voices
- Gadget and the Gadgetinis - Additional Voices
- G.I. Joe: A Real American Hero - Topside
- G.I. Joe Extreme - Kang Chi 'Black Dragon' Lee (Season 2)
- Happy, the Littlest Bunny - Unknown
- Johnny Test - Additional Voices
- Jungle Book - Kaa
- Kid vs. Kat - Additional voices
- Krypto the Superdog - Tusky Husky, Waddles the Penguin, various
- LeapFrog - Additional Voices
- Littlest Pet Shop (1995) - Additional Voices
- Littlest Pet Shop (2012) - TV Studio tour guide, Princess Stori, Dr. Mooser, Passerby Chihuahua, Dr. Handsomeface
- LoliRock - Stanley
- Martha Speaks - O.G. Kennelly, various characters
- Mega Man - Cut Man, Ice Man, Bomb Man, Elec Man, Hard Man, Shadow Man, Toad Man
- Mummies Alive! - Mr. Huxley / Additional Voices
- My Little Pony: Friendship Is Magic - Young Hoops, Pinkie Pie's father, Carriage Stallions, Apple Split
- My Little Pony: Rainbow Roadtrip - Moody Root, Trout pony
- My Scene Goes Hollywood: The Movie - Jim
- NASCAR Racers - Additional Voices
- Pocket Dragon Adventures - Cuddles
- PollyWorld - Tech Guy
- The Puzzle Club Christmas Mystery
- RoboCop: Alpha Commando - Additional Voices
- The Ripping Friends - Pooperman
- Rudolph the Red-Nosed Reindeer: The Movie - Dancer
- Roary the Racing Car - Additional Voices
- Sabrina: The Animated Series - Additional Voices
- Santa's Christmas Snooze
- Sherlock Holmes in the 22nd Century - Additional Voices
- SheZow - Fuji Kido
- Skysurfer Strike Force - Zachariah Easel, Adam Hollister
- Sleeping Beauty - Misc
- Space Strikers - Malcolm
- StarBeam - Gramps
- Stone Protectors
- The Story of Christmas
- Street Sharks - Additional Voices
- Stories from My Childhood - Various Characters
- Timothy Tweedle the First Christmas Elf - Boo, Clyde
- The Wacky World of Tex Avery - Maurice
- What About Mimi? - Additional Voices
- Video Power - Additional Voices
- Voltron Force - Kloak
- Yakkity Yak - Gary
- Yvon of the Yukon - Hockey Dad, French Man, King Louis Actor, Dil, Private Fuji, Sweaty Guy, Guard, German Tourist, Beamish, The Duke, Guy Donnyette

=== Writer ===
- Bakugan Battle Brawlers
- Billy the Cat
- Beyblade
- Cybersix
- Dragon Ball
- Dragon Ball Z
- Transformers Armada
- Weird-Ohs

=== Casting director ===
- A Christmas Adventure... From a Book Called Wisely's Tales
- Fat Dog Mendoza
- Ghost Patrol
- Mama, Do You Love?
- Pocket Dragon Adventures
- Popeye's Voyage: The Quest for Pappy
- Project A-ko 2: Plot of the Daitokuji Financial Group
- Project A-ko 3: Cinderella Rhapsody
- Project A-Ko 4: Final
- Ranma ½
- Rekkit Rabbit
- Salty's Lighthouse
- Scary Godmother: The Revenge of Jimmy

=== Voice director ===
- Fat Dog Mendoza
- G.I. Joe: Valor vs. Venom
- Ed, Edd n Eddy
- Firehouse Tales
- Pucca
- Milo's Bug Quest
- My Little Pony: Friendship is Magic
  - My Little Pony: Equestria Girls
- Class of the Titans
- George of the Jungle
- Johnny Test
- Mega Man
- Littlest Pet Shop (2012)
- Kid vs. Kat
- Martha Speaks
- Little Witch
- Cardcaptors
- Salty's Lighthouse
- Inhumans
- Jibber Jabber
- Pirate Express
- Zigby
- Yakkity Yak
- A Christmas Adventure... From a Book Called Wisely's Tales
- Mama, Do You Love Me?
- Scary Godmother: The Revenge of Jimmy
- Popeye's Voyage: The Quest for Pappy
- Voltron Force
- Zoids: Fuzors
- Santa Mouse and the Ratdeer
- Astonishing X-Men
- Pocket Dragon Adventures
- Nerds and Monsters
- Transformers Armada
- Transformers Cybertron
- Transformers Energon
- Max Steel vs. The Mutant Menace
- Ricky Sprocket, Showbiz Boy
- LoliRock
- D'Myna Leagues
- Polly and the Pockets
- Mosaic
- What About Mimi?
- Stories from My Childhood
- Krypto the Superdog
- Peanuts Webisodes
- The Barbie film trilogy (starting with Barbie: Fairytopia)
- Being Ian
- Yvon of the Yukon
- Mega Babies
- Eternals
- Astonishing X-Men
- Peanuts Motion Comics
- Mega Man: Upon a Star
- Ed, Edd n Eddy's Big Picture Show
- Aaagh! It's the Mr. Hell Show!
- Rainbow Fish
- Packages from Planet X
- Pac-Man and the Ghostly Adventures
- Shelldon
- Maya the Bee
- SheZow
- Rekkit Rabbit
- Kelly's Dream Club
- Adventures of Mowgli
- Wolverine: Weapon X
- Wolverine vs. Sabretooth
- Wolverine: Origin
- Ultimate Wolverine vs. Hulk
- Inhumans
- Sausage Party
- Hot Wheels Battle Force 5
- Dragons: Fire and Ice
- Max Steel
- Finley the Fire Engine
- Ghost Patrol
- Supernoobs
- The Nutty Professor
- PollyWorld
- Hulk

=== Miscellaneous crew ===
- A-Ko The Versus - Dialogue Director
- Bakugan Battle Brawlers - Story Editor
- Billy the Cat - Dubbing Director
- Dragon Ball Z - Producer (Ocean Dub)
- Halloween: Resurgence - Boom Operator, Production Assistant
- The Magic Backpack - Production Assistant
- Max Steel Turbo Team: Fusion Tek - Recording Director
- Mega Man - Dialogue Director
- Mermaid's Scar - Dialogue Director
- One Big Hapa Family - Voice Dialogue Director
- Project A-ko 2: Plot of the Daitokuji Financial Group - Dialogue Director
- Project A-ko 3: Cinderella Rhapsody - Dialogue Director
- Project A-Ko 4: Final - Dialogue Director
- Ranma ½ - Translator, Dialogue Director
- Skysurfer Strike Force - Dialogue Editor
- Yvon of the Yukon - Co-Creator, Associate Producer
