= Project A-ko 2: Plot of the Daitokuji Financial Group =

1987 Japanese OVA film

プロジェクトA子2 大徳寺財閥の陰謀 (Project A-ko 2: Daitokuji Zaibatsu no Inbou)
- Genre: Action, comedy, science fiction
- Original video animation
- Directed by: Yuji Moriyama
- Produced by: Hisatoshi Maruyama; Naotaka Yoshida
- Written by: Takao Koyama
- Music by: Mariya Takeuchi
- Studio: A.P.P.P.
- Licensed by: NA: Discotek Media
- Released: May 21, 1987
- Runtime: 70 minutes

Project A-ko 2: The Plot of the Daitokuji Financial Group (プロジェクトA子2 大徳寺財閥の陰謀, Project A-ko 2: Daitokuji Zaibatsu no Inbou) is a 1987 Japanese anime OVA release directed by Yuji Moriyama. It is the sequel to the 1986 theatrical release Project A-ko.

== Plot ==
The plot is centered on B-ko's father Hikaru Daitokuji, a billionaire industrialist who bears a strong resemblance to Ted Turner and Tony Stark. B-ko's obsession with C-ko finds another outlet, as she uses her genius intellect to help the Alpha Cygnans repair their spaceship, since C-ko has developed a soft spot for the stranded Napolipolita and D. The Alpha Cygnans have turned their ship into a posh 30,000 room hotel, but long only to return home.

The plot also involves a stereotypical summertime swimming pool scene. The heroines are also being stalked by a steadily growing number of mysterious men in white suits, who all attempt to appear inconspicuous by nonchalantly reading newspapers. Later in the film, they reveal themselves as spies, their mission being the capture of the Cygnan "super-technology".

The climax of the film involves the military forces — being manipulated by Hikaru Daitokuji — attacking the Alpha Cygnan ship with a giant experimental mecha named the Queen Margarita (whose blueprints he confiscated from B-ko) in a greedy attempt at seizing their alien technology. Ultimately, B-ko's father flies into the fray wearing one of his daughter's Akagiyama battle suits and attempts to catch the Ship — which is plummeting back to Earth — and ends up blowing out his back (it appears that his spine is broken, but since he is seen walking again in FINAL, clearly this is not so).

== Cast ==
Character	Japanese voice actor	English dubbing actor
Eiko "A-ko" Magami	Miki Itō	Teryl Rothery
Biko "B-ko" Daitokuji	Emi Shinohara	Venus Terzo
Shiko "C-ko" Kotobuki	Michie Tomizawa	Cathy Weseluck
Hikari Daitokuji	Hōchū Ōtsuka	Ian James Corlett
Miss Ayumi	Asami Mukaidono	Lynda Boyd
Captain Napolipolita	Shūichi Ikeda	Scott McNeil
Spy D	Tesshō Genda	Robert O. Smith
Mari	Daisuke Gōri (male voice); Sayuri Ikemoto (female voice)	Scott McNeil (male voice)
Asa	Yōko Ogai	Lynda Boyd
Ine	Yoshino Takamori	Venus Terzo
Ume	Megumi Hayashibara	Cathy Weseluck

== Production staff ==
- Directors: Yuji Moriyama
- Writers: Takao Koyama
- Music: Mariya Takeuchi
- Director of photography: Norihide Kubota
- Art director: Jun'ichi Higashi
- Sound director: Yasunori Honda
- Character designer: Yuji Moriyama
- Animation director: Yuji Moriyama
- Producers: Hisatoshi Maruyama, Kazufumi Nomura, Naotaka Yoshida

== Production and release ==
For the North American release of Project A-ko 2 and further installations of the series, Central Park Media commissioned Ocean Productions for the English dub.

CPM released Project A-ko 2, along with Project A-ko 3: Cinderella Rhapsody and Project A-ko 4: FINAL on the DVD compilation Project A-ko: Love & Robots on August 6, 2002. Discotek Media reissued Project A-ko 2 on DVD on September 26, 2017, and later on Blu-ray on August 30, 2022, featuring a new remastered scan of the original 35mm film.
