= Project A-ko 4: Final =

1989 Japanese animated film

プロジェクトA子 完結篇 (Project A-ko: Kanketsuron)
- Genre: Action, comedy, science fiction
- Original video animation
- Directed by: Yuji Moriyama
- Written by: Tomoko Kawasaki
- Music by: Kentarō Haneda
- Studio: Studio Fantasia
- Licensed by: NA: Discotek Media
- Released: October 7, 1989
- Runtime: 54 minutes

Project A-ko 4: Final (プロジェクトA子 完結篇, Project A-ko: Kanketsuron) is a 1989 Japanese anime OVA release directed by Yuji Moriyama. It is the fourth installment of the Project A-ko series.

== Story ==
The Alpha Cygnans — still searching for their "lost princess" — return to Earth, this time with a fleet of three thousand ships. A pendant is unearthed in ancient Babylon, identical to one belonging to Miss Ayumi, who is about to get married. Hikaru Daitokuji arranges a marriage between Miss Ayumi and Kei.

The wedding takes place at the gymnasium at Graviton City High School for Girls. At the same time, the Alpha Cygnan fleet — with their Queen on the flagship — approach the city, trying to stop the wedding. The weakened Earth Defense Force try to stop them from stopping the wedding. While all this is happening, A-ko and B-ko tear apart the wedding and try to do so to each other. Kei, Ayumi, and C-ko are caught in the middle of the melee.

Interspersed with the main narrative are cuts of an archeological team in Iraq, deciphering some apocalyptic writings at an ancient site that may have something to do with the approach of the Alpha Cygnans. It reads that Alpha-Cygni's alien princess will be claimed and demons will be unleashed on the Earth for ten days. Also it has a connection to the star of David. Suddenly the wall begins to part revealing a statue (which looks like C-ko) that causes the temple to collapse on the archeologists.

The aliens finally arrive and explain that their princess must come with them. C-ko's mother reveals herself and convinces her daughter it is time to go home. C-ko agrees since she feels she never really fit in with any of her classmates anyway. Miss Ayumi is outraged that nothing special happened to her because of her lucky charm pendant and smashes it while the Captain and D lament that they have been left behind because the Captain wasted time getting there by picking up a few more alcoholic drinks. A-ko and B-ko chase after the alien ship in B-ko's giant robot. When it runs out of fuel B-ko carries A-ko using her flying battlesuit and continues the pursuit into outer space. After C-ko sees A-ko outside the ship's window she is delighted until she watches them slowly lose ground and eventually plummet to Earth, B-ko's suit out of power and appearing as a shooting star to viewers on the ground.

The next day A-ko sadly wakes up and walks downstairs to answer the door. A-ko is overjoyed to discover C-ko, who happily tells her she changed her mind and came back. As A-ko hugs C-ko, C-ko makes her promise to never fight with B-ko ever again, and the two girls lived happily ever after.

== Cast ==
Character	Japanese voice actor	English dubbing actor
Eiko "A-ko" Magami	Miki Itō	Teryl Rothery
Biko "B-ko" Daitokuji	Emi Shinohara	Venus Terzo
Shiko "C-ko" Kotobuki	Michie Tomizawa	Cathy Weseluck
Miss Ayumi	Asami Mukaidono	Lynda Boyd
Kei Yūki	Tesshō Genda	Scott McNeil
Hikari Daitokuji	Hōchū Ōtsuka	Ian James Corlett
Kei's Mother	Reiko Mutō	
Captain Napolipolita	Shūichi Ikeda	Scott McNeil
Spy D	Tesshō Genda	Robert O. Smith
Mari	Daisuke Gōri (male voice); Sayuri Ikemoto (female voice)	Scott McNeil (male voice)
Asa	Yōko Ogai	Lynda Boyd
Ine	Yoshino Takamori	Venus Terzo
Ume	Megumi Hayashibara	Cathy Weseluck
C-ko's Mother	Sumi Shimamoto	Janyse Jaud

== Production and release ==
Central Park Media released Project A-ko 4, along with Project A-ko 2: Plot of the Daitokuji Financial Group and Project A-ko 3: Cinderella Rhapsody on the DVD compilation Project A-ko: Love & Robots on August 6, 2002. Discotek Media reissued Project A-ko 4 on DVD on September 26, 2017.
