= Project A-ko 3: Cinderella Rhapsody =

1988 Japanese original video animation

- VHS cover art

プロジェクトA子3 シンデレララプソディ (Purojekuto A-ko 3 - Shinderera Rapusodi)
- Genre: Action, comedy, science fiction
- Original video animation
- Directed by: Yuji Moriyama
- Written by: Tomoko Kawasaki
- Music by: Hiromoto Tobisawa
- Studio: Studio Fantasia
- Licensed by: NA: Discotek Media
- Released: June 20, 1988
- Runtime: 46 minutes

Project A-ko 3: Cinderella Rhapsody (プロジェクトA子3 シンデレララプソディ, Purojekuto A-ko 3 - Shinderera Rapusodi) is a 1988 Japanese anime OVA release directed by Yuji Moriyama. It is the third installment of the Project A-ko series.

== Plot ==
Project A-ko 3: Cinderella Rhapsody opens with a fluidly-animated dream sequence of A-ko, B-ko, and C-ko engaged in a game of pool, but this has nothing to do with the rest of the storyline.

It is Spring Break for the students of Graviton High. While B-ko plots to whisk C-ko away to some secluded location, C-ko dreams only of spending time with A-ko, having fun as usual. A-ko, however, has other plans and decides that it is time to "stop hanging around" with C-ko and find a boyfriend.

Unsatisfied with her wardrobe, she gets a job at a local fast food restaurant to earn money to buy new clothes. This leaves C-Ko feeling quite lonely, so she spends most of her days waiting for A-ko to get off of work.

One day, A-ko runs into Kei Yuki, a handsome biker. To her great delight, Kei returns to the restaurant where she works and seems to hang about. B-ko also notices Kei and decides to "steal" him from A-ko. Later, C-ko sees A-ko and Kei arriving on Kei's motorcycle. She runs up to A-ko and snarls and hisses at Kei like a feral cat, angry that he is robbing her of A-ko's affections.

A-ko and B-ko's battle for the habitually silent Kei culminates in a disastrous "date" at the Alpha Cygnans' Space Hotel. During the posh event, A-ko realizes that she removed her magic armbands which keep her powers under control. Without them, her strength is so great that it obliterates everything she touches. The destruction spurs Graviton City's overenthusiastic Public Works Defense Force into action. This colorful all-volunteer force (of which Miss Ayumi is a proud member) assemble from all corners of the city, clad in superhero outfits and piloting a small army of various mecha.

Just when it seems that all hell is going to break loose, A-ko and B-ko's melee comes to an abrupt halt when Kei reveals his love for C-ko, but C-ko utterly rejects him.

A-ko and B-ko are both crushed and disappointed, but A-ko does find joy in being with her best friend again.

== Cast ==
Character	Japanese voice actor	English dubbing actor
Eiko "A-ko" Magami	Miki Itō	Teryl Rothery
Biko "B-ko" Daitokuji	Emi Shinohara	Venus Terzo
Shiko "C-ko" Kotobuki	Michie Tomizawa	Cathy Weseluck
Kei Yūki	Tesshō Genda	Scott McNeil
Hikari Daitokuji	Hōchū Ōtsuka	Ian James Corlett
Miss Ayumi	Asami Mukaidono	Lynda Boyd
Captain Napolipolita	Shūichi Ikeda	Scott McNeil
Spy D	Tesshō Genda	Robert O. Smith
Mari	Daisuke Gōri (male voice); Sayuri Ikemoto (female voice)	Scott McNeil (male voice)
Asa	Yōko Ogai	Lynda Boyd
Ine	Yoshino Takamori	Venus Terzo
Ume	Megumi Hayashibara	Cathy Weseluck

== Production and release ==
Central Park Media released Project A-ko 3, along with Project A-ko 2: Plot of the Daitokuji Financial Group and Project A-ko 4: FINAL on the DVD compilation Project A-ko: Love & Robots on August 6, 2002. Discotek Media reissued Project A-ko 3 on DVD on September 26, 2017, and later on Blu-ray on December 27, 2022.
