= Lynda Boyd =

Canadian actress (born 1965)

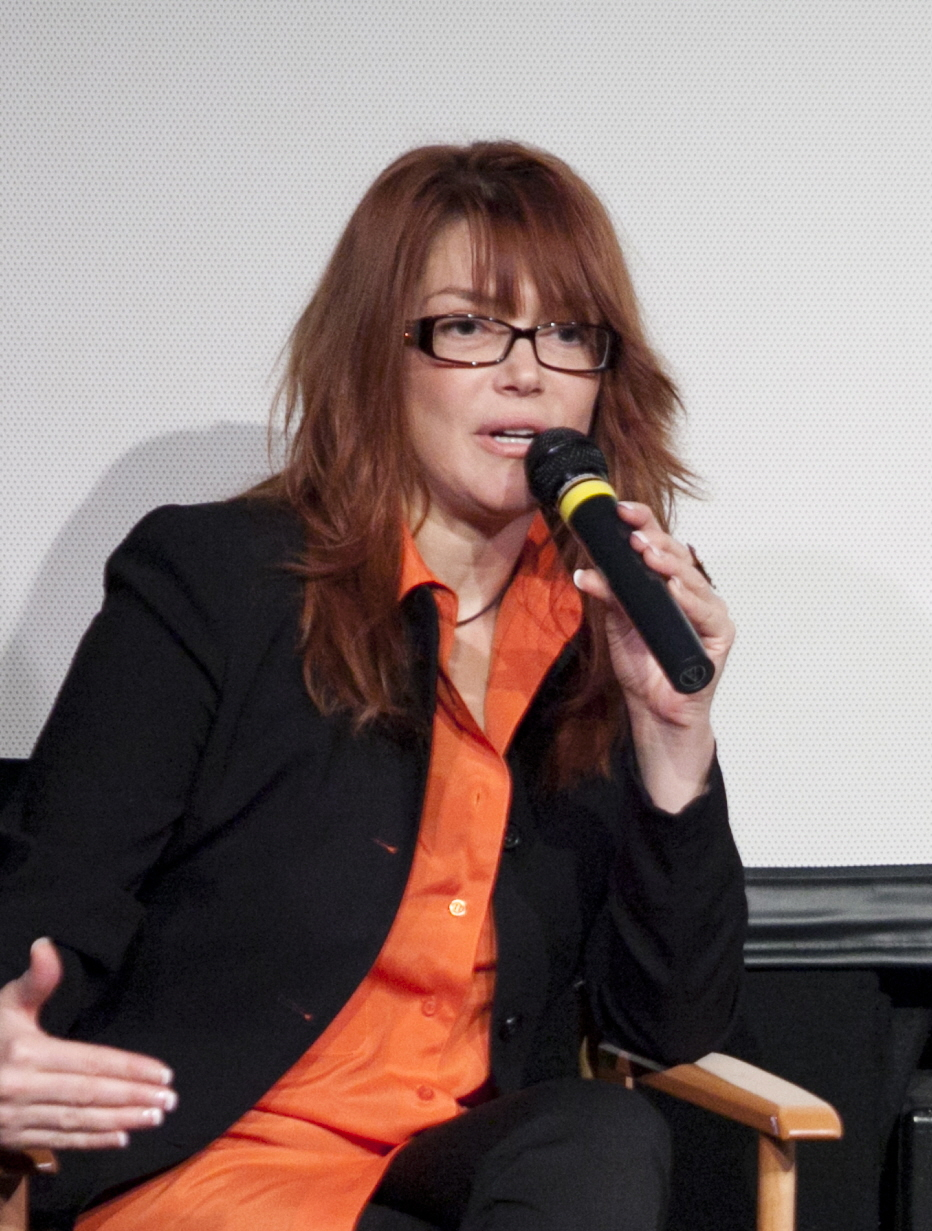
- Boyd in 2012
- Born: January 28, 1965 (age 61); Vancouver, British Columbia, Canada
- Occupation: Actress
- Years active: 1986–present
- Website: www.lyndaboyd.ca

Lynda Boyd (born January 28, 1965) is a Canadian actress. She is perhaps best known for her roles in the films Final Destination 2 (2003), An Unfinished Life (2005), She's the Man (2006), and On Thin Ice with Diane Keaton. She had minor roles in I Spy (2002), About A Girl (2007), The Fast and the Furious: Tokyo Drift (2006), and Intern Academy (2004). She was also the voice of Cologne in Ranma ½, and the voice of Viv the Bunny on the Sunbow cartoon series Littlest Pet Shop. A prolific television actress, Boyd was a series regular on the Canadian comedy-drama police procedural Republic of Doyle (2010-2014). She was also a series regular on the British crime drama Tin Star (2017-2020). From 2019-2022 she had a recurring role on the Netflix romantic drama series Virgin River.

== Career ==
Lynda Boyd played the lead role for four seasons in WTN's You, Me, and the Kids. Boyd also wrote three of the episodes.

Boyd appeared as recurring villainess Dana Whitcomb in six episodes of SyFy Channel's Sanctuary in 2008 and 2009.

Boyd has garnered Gemini Award nominations for Best Actress in a Guest Role in a Drama Series for Cold Squad at the 13th Gemini Awards in 1998 and Best Supporting Actress in a Drama Series for ABC Family's Falcon Beach at the 22nd Gemini Awards in 2007.

A singer for many years, Boyd has starred in such musicals as The Rocky Horror Show, Guys and Dolls, and Little Shop of Horrors. She also sang and toured with The Blenders in the 1980s.

Between 2010 and 2014, Boyd starred in the Canadian drama/comedy series Republic of Doyle as the character Rose Miller. In 2010, she was nominated for a Gemini Award in the category of Best Performance by an Actress in a Continuing Leading Dramatic Role for her role on the show at the 25th Gemini Awards.

On August 3, 2011, Boyd rowed in the legendary Royal St. John's Regatta for the Republic of Doyle sponsored women's crew. They came in second. Boyd said she rowed on a Vancouver team earlier that spring in order to prepare for the race.

Between 2017 and 2020, Boyd was also a series regular on the western television series Tin Star, opposite Christina Hendricks and Tim Roth.

== Filmography ==
=== Film ===
Year	Title	Role	Notes
1987	Project A-Ko 2: Plot of the Daitokuji Financial Group	Miss Ayumi (voice)	
1988	Project A-Ko 3: Cinderella Rhapsody	Miss Ayumi (voice)	
1989	Project A-Ko 4: Final	Miss Ayumi (voice)	
1991	Ranma ½: The Movie, Big Trouble in Nekonron, China	Monlon (voice)	
1993	Hakkenden shin sho	Tamazusa #2 (voice)	
1993	Fatal Fury 2: The New Battle	Elza (voice)	
1995	Little Orphan Annie's A Very Animated Christmas	Businesswoman (voice)	Short
1997	The Invader	Gail	
1998	Disturbing Behavior	Mrs. Lucille Strick	
1999	My Father's Angel	Zlata	
2000	Mission to Mars	NASA Wife	
2000	Best in Show	Cabot Party Guest	
2001	War Bride	Dee Dee	
2001	A Christmas Adventure ...From a Book Called Wisely's Tale	Prancer (voice)	
2001	Bones	Nancy Peet	
2002	Leaving Metropolis	Kryla	
2002	Beauty Shot	Samantha Steele	Short
2002	I Spy	Edna	
2003	Final Destination 2	Nora Carpenter	
2003	Pits	The Receptionist	Short
2004	The Perfect Score	Mrs. Ross	
2004	Whitecoats	Cynthia Skyes	
2004	Going the Distance	Toni	
2004	Reflection	Natalie Laine	Short
2005	Reefer Madness: The Movie Musical	Mrs. Deirdre Greevey	
2005	Sandra Gets Dumped	Mrs. B	Short
2005	An Unfinished Life	Kitty	
2006	She's the Man	Cheryl	
2006	The Fast and the Furious: Tokyo Drift	Ms. Boswell	
2006	Almost Heaven	Samantha Robbins	
2008	Vice	Madam	
2008	Another Cinderella Story	Evie Parker	
2008	Run Rabbit Run	Theresa King	
2008	The Brute	Grace	Short film
2008	Slap Shot 3: The Junior League	Bernie Frazier	
2009	Rampage	Mrs. Williamson	
2009	Damage	Veronica Reynolds	
2010	Hot Tub Time Machine	Adam's Secretary	Uncredited
2010	Plant Girl	Wendy (voice)	Short
2010	Ramona and Beezus	Triplet Mother	
2014	We Were Wolves	Kathleen	
2015	The Age of Adaline	Regan	
2019	Playing with Fire	Patty	
2021	Broken Diamonds	Mom	
2023	With Love and a Major Organ	Dr. Lee	

=== Television ===
Year	Title	Role	Notes
1986	Danger Bay	Nancy Keller	Episode: "Aquarius"
1986	Maison Ikkoku	Mrs. Godai (voice)	Episode: "Kyoko's Ticking Time Bomb! Godai's Extended Absence"
1989	Camp Candy	Additional voices	10 episodes
1990	Project A-Ko: Gray Side/Blue Side	Liza (voice)	2 episodes
1992	The Heights	Sarah Meade	Episode: "The Transformation"
1993	Without a Kiss Goodbye	Woman in Audience	TV movie
1993	Double, Double, Toil and Trouble	Singer	TV movie
1993	Animated Classic Showcase	Additional voices	12 episodes
1993–1995	The Hakkenden	Tamasuza (voice)	7 episodes
1993–1995	The X-Files	Mrs. Kotchek/Elizabeth	2 episodes
1994	Betrayal of Trust	(uncredited)	TV movie
1994	The Commish	Clerk	Episode: "Romeo and Juliet"
1994	This Can't Be Love	Latrice	TV movie
1995	Littlest Pet Shop	Viv (voice)	40 episodes
1995	Highlander: The Series	Karen	Episode: "Song of the Executioner"
1995	Strange Luck	First Pregnant Woman	Episode: "Angie's Turn"
1995	Shadow of a Doubt	2nd Deputy	TV movie
1995–1997	Street Fighters: The Animated Series	Additional voices	15 episodes
1996	Generation X	Alicia Lee	TV movie
1996	Harvey	Mrs. Chumley	TV movie
1996	Millennium	Mrs. Peggy Dechant	Episode: "Blood Relatives"
1996	Adventures in Painting	Todd's Mother	Episode: "Your Child's Behavior"
1997	The Sentinel	Secretary	Episode: "Dead Drop"
1997	Volcano: Fire on the Mountain	Maureen	TV movie
1997	The Adventures of Shirley Holmes	Dr. Stavko	Episode: "The Case of the Alien Abductions"
1997	The Stepsister	Margaret 'Maggie' Curtis	TV movie
1997	Angels in the Endzone	Grace Harper	TV movie
1997	Nights Below Station Street	Rita Walsh	TV movie
1998	I Know What You Did	Liz	TV movie
1998	Cold Squad	Brenda	Episode: "Janine Elston"
1998	Nobody Lives Forever	Sgt. Karen Compton	TV movie
1998	Da Vinci's Inquest	Hope Martin	Episode: "The Quality of Mercy"
1998	Dead Man's Gun	Rita Lemay	Episode: "The Ripper"
1998	Honey, I Shrunk the Kids: The TV Show	Perky	Episode: "Honey, I've Joined the Big Top"
1998	It's True	Mom	Episode: "The Rats of Rumfordton (Pilot)"
1998–1999	The Outer Limits	Marie Venable/Danielle Buchanan	2 episodes
1998–1999	The Crow: Stairway to Heaven	Darla Mohr	14 episodes
1998–2001	You, Me and the Kids	Rachel Todd	104 episodes
1999	Silver Wolf	Anna McLean	TV movie
1999	Sweetwater	Alice Belzer	TV movie
1999	So Weird	Evelyn	Episode: "Siren"
1999	The Sheldon Kennedy Story}	Shirley Kennedy	TV movie
2000	Navigating the Heart	Cara Lieb	TV movie
2000	The Inspectors 2: A Shred of Evidence	Trudy Barron	TV movie
2000	Secret Agent Man	Ivana	Episode: "Like Father, Like Monk"
2000	Mysterious Ways	Shannon	Episode: "Amazing Grace"
2000	Higher Ground	Alice Merrick Blaine	2 episodes
2000	The New Adventures of Spin and Marty: Suspect Behavior	Stephanie Evans	TV movie
2000	Level 9	Rose	Episode: "The Programmer"
2001	ER	Deborah Harris	Episode: "Piece of Mind"
2001	These Arms of Mine	Louise	Episode: "My So-Called Episode"
2002	Due East	Lizann Gold	TV movie
2002	Damaged Care	Andrea Dubose	TV movie
2002	The Twilight Zone	Head Nurse	Episode: "One Night at Mercy"
2003	Bliss	Isabel	Episode: "The Marvellon"
2003	An Unexpected Love	Bobby	TV movie
2003	On Thin Ice	Carrie Kilmer	TV movie
2004	The Goodbye Girl	Donna Douglas	TV movie
2004	Smallville	Mrs. Baker	Episode: "Obsession"
2004	Kingdom Hospital	Mrs. Sullivan	Episode: "Black Noise"
2004	(TV series)The Mountain	Mona Richards	Episode: "A Piece of the Rock"
2004–2008	The L Word	Fiona Shaw/Isabelle Halsey	2 episodes
2005	Falcon Beach	Darlene Shedden	TV movie
2005	Beach Girls	Prue	6 episodes
2006	In God's Country	Louise	TV movie
2006	Godiva's	Veronique Lancaster	3 episodes
2006	Firestorm: Last Stand at Yellowstone	Margaret Sheldon	TV movie
2006	Masters of Horror	Carolyn	Episode: "The V Word"
2006–2007	Falcon Beach	Darlene Shedden	15 episodes
2007	Shark	Maya Snider	Episode: "Porn Free"
2007	Cold Case	Caroline Dratton	Episode: "The Good Death"
2007	Traveler	Felicia Cruz	Episode: "The Out"
2007	About a Girl	Mrs. Ryan	3 episodes
2007	Kaya	Ellie	4 episodes
2008	Robson Arms	Frances	Episode: "I Pagliacci"
2008	True Confessions of a Hollywood Starlet	Bianca Carter	TV movie
2008–2009	Sanctuary	Dana Whitcomb	6 episodes
2008–2015	Canooks	Shelli Clark	17 episodes
2009	Psych	Miss Annie	Episode: "High Noon-ish"
2009	Do You Know Me	Anna Carter	TV movie
2009	Killer Hair	Marcia Robinson	TV movie
2010	The Client List	Jacie	TV movie
2010–2014	Republic of Doyle	Rose Miller	Main role Nominated - Gemini Award for Best Performance by an Actress in a Continuing Leading Dramatic Role
2012	R.L. Stine's The Haunting Hour	Beverly	Episode: "Spaceman"
2013–2020	Supernatural	Dr. Jennifer O'Brien/Moira/Fortuna	2 episodes
2015	When Calls the Heart	Grace Thatcher	6 episodes
2015	Harvest Moon	Lou	TV movie
2015	The Christmas Note	Vivian	TV movie
2015–2016	Arrow	Phaedra Nixon	3 episodes
2016	Dater's Handbook	Gloria	TV movie
2017	Christmas in Evergreen	Barbara	TV movie
2017	Girlfriends' Guide to Divorce	Dr. Blaker	Episode: "Rule #155: Go with the Magician"
2017–2019	Tin Star	Randy Harrison	12 episodes
2018	Trust	Jacqueline	Episode: "The House of Getty"
2019	SnowComing	Alice	TV movie
2019	The InBetween	Barbara Miller	Episode: "Kiss Them for Me"
2019	Hospital Show	Rosanna	6 episodes
2019–2022	Virgin River	Lily	18 episodes
2020	You Me Her	Jess Silva	3 episodes
2020	The Haunting of Bly Manor	Judy O'Mara	Episode: "The Way It Came"
2020–2021	Supergirl	Mrs. Teschmacher	2 episodes
2021	An Unexpected Christmas	Diane	TV movie
2021	Christmas in Tahoe	Joyce Donaldson	TV movie
2021–2024	Family Law	Crystal Steele	7 episodes
2022	Cut, Color, Murder	Rachel	TV movie
2022	Aurora Teagarden Mysteries: Haunted by Murder	Mona	TV movie
2023	The Wedding Veil Inspiration	Nancy	TV movie
2023	Make Me a Match	Janice	TV movie
2023	The More Love Grows	Cindy	TV movie
2023	Christmas on Cherry Lane	Evelyn Sawyer	TV movie
2023	Dial S for Santa	Ginnie Lawton	TV movie
2023–2024	Sullivan's Crossing	Phoebe Lancaster	14 episodes
2024	The Real West	Maureen	TV movie
2024	Fire Country	Joanne	Episode: "Keep Your Cool"
2024	A Christmas Less Traveled	Paulette	TV movie
2024	Happy Howlidays	Cindy Park	TV movie
2025	Wild Cards	Anastasia Van Der Haan	Episode: "Death By Design"
2025	Heartland	Tammie Stillman	Episode: "Lost and Found"
2026	Blue Skies	Madge	3 episodes
