= Project A-ko: Gray Side/Blue Side =

1990 original video animation

- Cover art of "Gray Side"
- Original video animation
- Directed by: Katsuhiko Nishijima
- Written by: Katsuhiko Nishijima; Tomoko Kawasaki; Yuji Kawahara
- Music by: Kenji Kawai; Kohei Tanaka
- Studio: Nextart; Studio Fantasia
- Licensed by: AUS: Madman Entertainment; NA: Central Park Media
- Released: July 21 – August 21, 1990
- Runtime: 50 minutes (each)
- Episodes: 2
- Alternative titles
- A-ko the Versus; Project A-ko: Vs; Project A-ko: Uncivil Wars

Project A-ko: Gray Side/Blue Side is a 1990 Japanese anime OVA series directed by Katsuhiko Nishijima. Though it features the main characters of the Project A-ko series, it is set in an alternate universe. It was released in two episodes: "Gray Side" on July 21 and "Blue Side" on August 21.

== Plot ==
A-ko and B-ko are partners and bounty hunters who hunt giant tortoises on a sand planet. When C-ko is kidnapped by a gang of space pirates, A-ko and B-ko set off to rescue her, thinking only of the reward money offered by her wealthy father. Aided by a pint-sized Galactic Police Officer named Maruten, the girls discover that C-ko's abduction is part of a much larger scheme. Gail, the charismatic leader of the space pirates, intends to use C-ko's body as a host for the spirit of Xena, a long-dead sorceress. Although Gail believes that Xena will "purify" the universe, he is oblivious to her true motive: to annihilate all universes and create a new one in which she is the absolute ruler.

The final showdown occurs in the Talho sector, where Xena begins to merge all existing universes into one. This features A-ko and B-ko fighting each other in a variety of different eras and locations, including the climactic battle of the first film. This seems to suggest that the two are always destined to battle.

The audience is also treated to what could be a brief glimpse of A-ko and B-ko back on planet Earth, in which the girls graduate from Graviton High and continue their rivalry for Kei in the workplace.

In the end, the universe is saved, Maruten takes all of the credit, and A-ko and B-ko are left as broke and short-tempered as they began.

== Cast ==
Character	Japanese voice actor	English dubbing actor
A-ko	Miki Itō	Teryl Rothery
B-ko	Emi Shinohara	Venus Terzo
C-ko	Michie Tomizawa	Cathy Weseluck
Maruten	Masami Kikuchi	Richard Newman
Liza Chichi	Saeko Shimazu	Lynda Boyd
Gail	Show Hayami	Paul Dobson
Grash	Hiroshi Takemura	Ted Cole
Xena	Michie Tomizawa	Cathy Weseluck

== Production and release ==
Central Park Media released the OVA series on the DVD compilation Project A-ko: Uncivil Wars on August 23, 2005.
