= Yuji Moriyama =

Japanese animator

Yūji Moriyama (もりやま ゆうじ, 森山 雄治, Moriyama Yūji; born January 6, 1960) is a Japanese anime character designer, animator, animation supervisor and director. He is a member of the Japanese Animation Creators Association and a winner of the 4th Japan Animation Awards in the Animation Director category.

== Career ==
Moriyama began working as an in-between animation when he was a student at Kanto Daiichi High School. After graduating from high school, he joined Studio Musashi, which was recruiting staff through newspaper advertisements. His first work as an official in-betweener was for Toei Animation's Wakusei Robo Danguard Ace. He then moved to Studio Cockpit, where he worked on Galaxy Express 999, before moving on to NeoMedia. At NeoMedia, he worked on Invincible Robo Trider G7 for Sunrise, Doraemon for Shin-Ei Animation, and Belle and Sebastian for Visual 80. With Invincible Robo Trider G7, he was promoted from in-between to key animation. He left NeoMedia in 1982 to work as a freelancer, starting with Combat Mecha Xabungle and Acrobunch.

The popular anime Urusei Yatsura, in which he participated from the same year, was Moriyama's breakthrough work. With this series, he made his debut as an animation director and storyboard artist, and was in charge of the opening animation for the first time, joining a group of popular animators overnight. Chief director Mamoru Oshii, who was responsible for Urusei Yatsura, expected him to become a partner, so Moriyama tried his hand at manga as well by illustrating a manga written by Oshii that was serialized in the Animage magazine in 1984 called Todo no Tsumari... (とどのつまり…). He also worked on the Urusei Yatsura films as well, including and films Beautiful Dreamer and Only You. For Beautiful Dreamer, he worked on key animation, animation director, as well as mechanical designs for the film.

After the end of Urusei Yatsura, he was selected as a character designer for the later series Maison Ikkoku, and has since been in charge of character design for many other works. In 1987, he won the 4th Japan Anime Awards in the Animation Director category. After that, he shifted from animating to directing.

Yuji Moriyama is credited with character design and animation director for the Project A-Ko series.

Moriyama was one of the founding members of Studio MIN, a group of freelance animators, and after MIN was disbanded in 1991, he participated in numerous works since, mainly for Chaos Project and Pierrot. Some of his many pennames include Motoyama Yūji (もとやまゆうじ), Saihō Jōdo (西宝 壌土), Kazama Kotarō (風間 小太郎), Sunakawa Norihiro (砂川 則博), MONTAN, Shibakano Wataya (芝跨野 渡也), Shibamata Tōya (柴又 十哉), Aran Sumishi (阿藍 隅史), Nekobu Nachiko (猫部 那智子), and Gyoden Tadao (魚田 尹夫).

== Filmography ==
- Cream Lemon Part 4: Pop Chaser (1985, OVA), character design, key animation
- Project A-ko (1986, film), character design, animation director
- Honō no Tenkōsei (1991, OVA), character design
- Luna Varga (1991, OVA), character design
- Mōryō Senki MADARA (1991, OVA), director
- All Purpose Cultural Cat Girl Nuku Nuku (1992, OVA), character design, animation director
- 801 T.T.S. Airbats (1994, OVA), chief director, character design
- Compiler (1994, OVA), character design
- Fire Emblem (1995, OVA), character design
- Adventures of Kotetsu (1996, OVA), director
- Agent Aika (1997, OVA), character design
- Jungle de Ikou! (1997, OVA), director, storyboard, character design, animation director, original story
- Geobreeders (1998, OVA), chief director
- Geobreeders 2 (2000, OVA), script, character design, animation director
- Gensomaden Saiyuki: Requiem (2001, film), character design
- Step Up Love Story (2002, OVA), director
- Madara (OVA), director, character design
- Maison Ikkoku (TV), character design
- Maison Ikkoku: Kanketsuhen (film), character design
- Norakuro-kun (TV), character design
- Project A-ko 2: Plot of the Daitokuji Financial Group (OVA), director, original creator, character design, animation director
- Project A-ko 3: Cinderella Rhapsody (OVA), director, character design, original story
- Project A-ko 4: Final (OVA), director, character design, original story
- Saiyuki (TV), character design
- Shrine of the Morning Mist (TV), director
- Tales of Titillation (OVA), character design – episode 1
- Tokyo Underground (TV), character design
- Urusei Yatsura: Remember My Love (film), chief animation director
- Yawaraka Sangokushi Tsukisase!! Ryofuko-chan (OVA), director, character design
