= Project A-ko =

1986 Japanese animated film

- Theatrical release poster art

Japanese name
- Kanji: プロジェクトA子
Transcriptions
- Revised Hepburn: Purojekuto Ēko
- Directed by: Katsuhiko Nishijima
- Written by: Katsuhiko Nishijima; Tomoko Kawasaki; Yuji Moriyama
- Story by: Katsuhiko Nishijima; Kazumi Shirasaka
- Produced by: Kazufumi Nomura
- Starring: Miki Itō; Michie Tomizawa; Emi Shinohara; Asami Mukaidono
- Music by: Richie Zito; Joey Carbone; Toru Akasaka
- Production companies: A.P.P.P. Soeishinsha
- Distributed by: Shochiku
- Release date: June 21, 1986
- Running time: 84 minutes
- Country: Japan
- Language: Japanese

Project A-ko (Japanese: プロジェクトA子, Hepburn: Purojekuto Ēko) is a 1986 Japanese animated science fiction action comedy film. The film focuses on 16-year-old Japanese schoolgirl A-ko, who defends her best friend C-ko, as they face off against their classmate and rival B-ko while the Earth faces the threat of an alien invasion. Both Katsuhiko Nishijima and Yuji Moriyama directed it, though the latter also did character design. The film project initially started as part of the Cream Lemon series of original video animation, but later became its own film. The film staff was motivated to produce a fun and exciting film in contrast to the more serious anime films being produced at the time. Additionally, the film includes a variety of references and parodies a number of other works of anime from the 1970s and 1980s.

The film was largely well received by critics who praised the humor and action and considered it an anime classic. Outside of Japan, the film was seen by many fans of anime which served as an introduction to the medium. The film was followed up by several sequels and a spin-off, starting with Project A-Ko 2 in 1987. The original 35mm film negatives were once thought lost until they were recovered in 2021.

== Plot ==
An alien spaceship crashes into Graviton City, wiping out the entire population and leaving a massive crater where the city is rebuilt 16 years later. High school students Eiko "A-ko" Magami, a perky, fun-loving red-haired, sailor-suited teenage girl, and her best friend Shiko "C-ko" Kotobuki, a bubbly, carefree optimist, enter a new year of school as transfer students at the all-girls Graviton High School. Although A-ko possesses superhuman speed and strength, she considers herself an average teenager. She mostly worries about getting to school on time, due to her habit of chronically oversleeping her alarm clock each morning. The pair catch the unwanted attention of Biko "B-ko" Daitokuji, a rich, snobbish, spoiled, and brilliant fellow student.

B-ko develops an obsession in regards to C-ko, and is determined to win her over. B-ko's attempts to win C-ko over fail, however, and remembering that she was A-ko's rival back in kindergarten, B-ko creates a series of mecha piloted by her team of female followers to attack A-ko each morning. After losing each new and more powerful mecha, she eventually creates and dons the "Akagiyama 23", a powered suit that looks like a bikini. B-ko quickly escalates the fight across the school with no restraint.

Trench-coated spy "D" has been monitoring A-ko and C-ko each morning and reporting back to a large spacecraft as it approaches Earth. The aliens' conclusion is that they have located the lost princess they have been seeking. The aliens finally reach Earth and begin an all-out attack against the Graviton military, which is outmatched by the alien technology. A-ko and B-ko's own fight continues across the big city even as the military and aliens do battle. C-ko is abducted in the middle of this confrontation by "D", who is revealed to be a member of the Lepton Kingdom of Alpha Cygni, an all-female race of aliens. C-ko is their princess.

Witnessing the abduction, A-ko and B-ko set aside their differences. Infiltrating the spaceship, A-ko confronts D and the ship's alcoholic Captain Napolipolita, while B-ko rescues C-ko. B-ko then reneges on the truce and opens fire on A-ko, D, and the Captain, destroying the ship's navigation system. The vessel lands, precariously perched on top of the city's Military Command Tower (actually the remains of the previously crashed ship). Having survived the crash, both A-ko and C-ko find themselves on top of an unconscious B-ko.

A-ko happily awakens the next morning, sore from the previous day's adventures, and walks with C-ko to school in their new uniforms. The girls pass by a disheveled D and the Captain begging for donations to repair their ship. The film ends with B-ko smiling as A-ko appears on the horizon.

== Voice actors ==
Character	Japanese voice actor	English dubbing actor
A-ko Magami	Miki Itō	Stacey Gregg
B-ko Daitokuji	Emi Shinohara	Denica Fairman
C-ko Kotobuki	Michie Tomizawa	Julia Brahms
Ayumi Azumi	Asami Mukaidono	Liza Ross
Captain Napolipolita	Shūichi Ikeda	Jay Benedict
Spy D	Tesshō Genda	Marc Smith
Mari	Daisuke Gōri (male voice); Sayuri Ikemoto (female voice)	Anne Marie Zola (female voice)
Asa	Yōko Ogai	Toni Barry
Ine	Yoshino Takamori	Anne Marie Zola
Ume	Megumi Hayashibara	Liza Ross

== Production ==
The currents [at that time] were shifting favorably towards more serious works that were loaded with meaning and heavy themes. It was a frustrating time for animators who liked to animate. A-ko was a deliberate attempt to push all that aside, to provide some mindless fun, to make an action-packed film that would be fun to make and fun to watch. I guess you could say it was an animator's anime. Animators who wanted to animate big action but couldn't, came together on this project and let it all hang out.
– Yuji Moriyama on why the film was made

Project A-ko was directed by Katsuhiko Nishijima who would later go on to direct Agent Aika and Labyrinth of Flames. The music for the film features music and songs composed by Richie Zito and Joey Carbone. Nishijima said that he wanted to make a film that directors Mamoru Oshii and Hayao Miyazaki were not able to make, which is a light hearted entertaining film without much deep social commentary. Yuji Moriyama is credited with character design and animation director, and previously worked on the Urusei Yatsura television series, and the films Beautiful Dreamer and Only You. According to Moriyama, the crew of the film had mostly worked on Urusei Yatsura, and felt demoralized after Mamoru Oshii left production of the series, and wished to work on a new project.

Production of the film included several artists who would later create other popular works, including Kia Asamiya and Atsuko Nakajima.

The title itself is a reference to the 1983 Jackie Chan film Project A, although the film bears no resemblance to Project A; the working title ended up sticking.

Project A-ko was initially planned to be part of the Cream Lemon series of pornographic OVAs, but during the production of the series, it was decided to make it into a more mainstream title. The only sequence animated during its Cream Lemon days left in the revised production is B-ko's private bath scene. In a nod to Project A-ko's origins as a Cream Lemon episode, the owner and several working girls from the brothel in the Cream Lemon episode "Pop Chaser" - where director Katsuhiko Nishijima was one of the animators - can be seen in one of the classrooms A-ko and B-ko crash through during a fight sequence in the film.

Moriyama explains that the names "A-ko", "B-ko", and "C-ko" were initially placeholder names that were kept throughout production rather than being replaced.

The film's format uses a surface plot a high stakes action story, while at the same time making allusions and parodies to a number of other works of anime from the 1970s and 1980s. The classmate Mari alludes to Fist of the North Star, and the character of the Captain Napolipolita is inspired by Captain Harlock. Additionally the forward section of the alien spacecraft looks like the ship "Arcadia" from Captain Harlock. In addition, the series makes homage to American comics as well, as A-ko's parents resemble Superman and Wonder Woman.

== Analysis ==
Project A-ko contains themes and elements common throughout other anime storylines. Infatuation is a common theme in Japanese anime storylines, where it is typically between a male and a female character, but in Project A-ko, the female B-ko is infatuated with another female, C-ko, and tries to separate her from A-ko. Though there are hints that the infatuation may be of lesbian in origin, it appears to be platonic in nature. B-ko is primarily motivated her ego and desire to control C-Ko, and acts like a bully throughout the film. The film contains satire of the kind of sentimental attachments females can have for each other in other anime, such as Gunbuster.

The relationship in the film has been described as a lesbian love triangle.

During a screening of the film in 1993, Michael Flores explained the relationship as part of Japanese culture and common in Japanese television and film. In his analysis, women are separated from men until they are about 18 or 19, and women form relationships and have love affairs with each other before they become interested in men, a trope that is explored in Japanese films and TV shows.

Additionally, it is common for anime and manga stories to include women who are independent and often powerful physical warriors, and A-ko is another example of this. Other examples include Battle Angel Alita and Ghost in the Shell.

The destruction and rebuilding of the city of Tokyo is a common theme throughout Japanese media (including the Godzilla franchise and Akira). In Project A-ko, the Gavitron City is modeled after Tokyo and is rebuilt after the catastrophic destruction of the crashing space ship at the beginning of the film.

== Soundtrack ==
Project A-ko: Original Soundtrack

Soundtrack album by Richie Zito and Joey Carbone
- Released: May 25, 1986
- Recorded: Doering Studio, Hollywood
- Genres: Film score; pop
- Length: 43:48
- Label: Polystar
- Producers: Joey Carbone; Richie Zito

Singles from Project A-ko: Original Soundtrack
- 1. "Dance Away" Released: May 25, 1986; 2. "Dance Away (Japanese Version)" Released: June 25, 1986

The film's soundtrack was released on LP, CD, and cassette through Polystar Records on May 25, 1986. It features the film score and songs composed by Richie Zito and Joey Carbone. The album was released in the U.S. in 1994 by Central Park Media under their MangaMusic label and later included as a bonus disc the "Collector's Series" DVD in 2002.

"Dance Away" by Annie Livingston was released as a single simultaneously with the album, with the background music track "Spaceship in the Dark" as the B-side. A Japanese-language version of "Dance Away" and "Follow Your Dream" by Project Sisters (プロジェクト・シスターズ, Purojekuto Shisutāzu) was released a month later.

=== Track listing ===
All music is composed by Joey Carbone and Richie Zito, except where indicated.

Side A
No.	Title	Lyrics	Music	Vocals	Length
1.	"Morning Light Type A"				1:49
2.	"Dance Away"	Zito	Carbone	Annie Livingston	3:40
3.	"Spaceship in the Dark"				5:06
4.	"Follow Your Dream"	Carbone; Zito		Valerie Stevenson	4:05
5.	"Morning Light Type B"				1:47
6.	"In Your Eyes"	Carbone	Carbone	Samantha Newark	3:48
Total length:					20:15

Side B
No.	Title	Music	Length
1.	"Explosion"		5:01
2.	"Follow Your Dream" (Instrumental)		4:08
3.	"Max 5000"		4:40
4.	"Jealous Eyes"	Carbone	4:45
5.	"Morning Light Type C"		1:18
6.	"Dance Away" (Instrumental (Note: Not included in LP release))	Carbone	3:41
Total length:			23:33

=== Personnel ===
- Joey Carbone – synthesizers, piano, drums, percussion
- Richie Zito – guitar, synthesizers, drums
- Arthur Barrow – bass, synthesizers, drums
- George Doering – guitar
- Andrea Robinson – backing vocals
- Laura Creamer – backing vocals

== Release ==
The film was released to theaters by Shochiku-Fuji on June 21, 1986, alongside a shorter film titled Going on a Journey: Ami Final Chapter. Pony Video distributed the film via VHS and LaserDisc later in the year. The film's soundtrack was released on LP, CD, and cassette through Polystar Records on May 25 of the same year. "Dance Away" by Annie Livingston was released as a single simultaneously with the album, with the background music track "Spaceship in the Dark" as the B-side. A Japanese-language version of "Dance Away" and "Follow Your Dream" by Project Sisters (プロジェクト・シスターズ, Purojekuto Shisutāzu) was released a month later.

Outside of Japan, many fans of anime would watch the film without subtitles and serve as an introduction to anime films. Project A-ko was Central Park Media's first video release in 1991 alongside Dominion Tank Police and M.D. Geist. They later released a dubbed version produced by Manga Entertainment to VHS in 1992. Both Project A-ko and Dominion Tank Police were later shown in America on the Sci-Fi Channel during a "Festival of Japanese Animation".

The album was released in the U.S. in 1994 by Central Park Media under their MangaMusic label and later included as a bonus disc the "Collector's Series" DVD in 2002.

In 1996, a CD-Rom package called "Anime Hyperguide: Project A-ko" was released, including artwork, interviews with the creators.

After releasing Project A-ko on DVD in its original widescreen video format, Central Park Media later released a "Collector's Series" version in 2002, which features remastered video and coloring, a large number of A-ko related extras, commentary and interviews by many of the Project A-ko staff, and a free Project A-ko soundtrack CD. Central Park Media has released the three OVA sequels in a single-disc DVD collection, Project A-ko: Love and Robots.

In May 2011, Eastern Star released a newly remastered R1 Project A-ko DVD. It contains many of the extras of the original CPM release, minus the soundtrack CD. Discotek Media released the film on Blu-ray in December 2021. Originally, the footage for the film was to be sourced from the laserdisc release using the Domesday Duplicator to capture the footage at a higher quality than previous releases, with a technology called AstroRes being used to upscale the footage and restore it to a higher quality. The film was instead sourced from the original 35mm film negatives, which were previously thought lost. The film negatives had been stored in a film laboratory but a clerical error had resulted in confusion as to where it was.

== Reception ==
The film has largely been praised by reviewers who consider it a classic for fans of Japanese anime. The film is considered to be a cult film in the west. The film's humor was praised, with Max Autohead from Hyper magazine saying that the film hits with its "cheesy" humor. Reviewer Joe Bob Briggs praised the film, citing the more adult subject matter compared to Saturday morning cartoons and crazy action, giving it four out of four stars. He placed the film alongside others such as Gunbuster and Dominion: Tank Police which feature scantily clad women in science fiction adventures causing a lot of mayhem. J-Fan praised the English dub and called it one of the best dubs from Manga Entertainment and a "near perfect" example of the genre.

GameFan writer Shidoshi considers the film a "must see" film for any serious anime fan, saying it rises above being a mere parody and stands on its own as a work. He also says that it is the best film in the series, with the sequels being the sort of work that the film set out to mock.

Game Zone magazine commented that the film is low on violence, but high on humor and girly fight scenes.

Writer James Swallow in Anime FX praised the film's action and humor, and said that Project A-ko and its sister OAVs were an archetype of the genre.

== Sequels ==
Project A-ko spawned a series of sequels which were original video animation (OVA) starting with Plot of the Daitokuji Financial Group in 1987, followed by Cinderella Rhapsody in 1988 and then FINAL in 1989. After this original series, a spin-off entitled A-ko the Vs (1990) was created and released in the OVA format. In this two-part series (a "Gray side" and "Blue side"), A-ko and B-ko are partners who hunt monsters in an extraterrestrial environment, with no relationship to the previous series. Central Park Media released it as Project A-ko: Uncivil Wars. The film also spawned an American produced comic series, and a tabletop role playing game.
