= Transformers: Cybertron =

Japanese/Canadian television series

- North American DVD cover featuring Optimus Prime and Megatron

トランスフォーマー ギャラクシーフォース (Toransufōmā Gyarakushī Fōsu)
- Genre: Adventure, mecha
- Created by: Hiroyuki Azuma; Steve Drucker
- Anime television series
- Directed by: Hiroyuki Kakudō (chief); Manabu Ono
- Produced by: Naoji Hara; Tomoya Izumi; Masahiko Yamazaki; Takehiro Miyazaki; Kōji Kajita
- Written by: Hiro Masaki
- Music by: Megumi Ōhashi
- Studio: Gonzo
- Licensed by: Hasbro
- Original network: TXN (TVA, TV Tokyo)
- English network: AU: Network Ten; CA: YTV; HK: ATV World; IE: RTÉ2; IN: Cartoon Network; NZ: TV2; UK: CITV, Toonami, Cartoon Network, Kix; US: Cartoon Network (Toonami), Univision, Kids' WB, G4 (Action Blast!), KidsClick (2018–2019); ZA: SABC 2
- Original run: January 8, 2005 – December 31, 2005
- Episodes: 52
- Manga
- Written by: Yoshihiro Iwamoto
- Published by: Kodansha
- Imprint: BomBom Comics
- Magazine: Comic BomBom
- Original run: January 2005 – September 2005
- Volumes: 1

Transformers: Cybertron, known as Transformers: Galaxy Force (トランスフォーマー ギャラクシーフォース) in Japan and Asia, is an anime series which debuted on January 8, 2005. It is set in the Transformers universe. Produced by TV Aichi, We've, Tokyu Agency and animated by Gonzo, the series is directed by Hiroyuki Kakudō and Manabu Ono, with Hiro Masaki handling series composition, Takashi Kumazen designing the characters, Mitsuru Ōwa serving as the mechanical and prop designer and Megumi Ōhashi composing the music. A corresponding toy line was released with the series.

The series was conceived by Hasbro as the final installment of a trilogy formed with the previous two series, Transformers: Armada and Transformers: Energon. However, the Japanese production did not follow through on this intent, scripting the series as an independent story unconnected to the preceding shows. The English dub partially modified the series to establish links back to Armada and Energon, including changes to dialogue and small portions of new animation. Trevor Devall (who voices Scourge in the Series) voiced Megatron in early episodes the English dub before previous voice actor David Kaye returned, reprising the role from the show's predecessors. Other voice actors include Garry Chalk reprising the role of Optimus Prime, Brian Drummond as the voices of Jolt and Jetfire (replacing Scott McNeil), Kirby Morrow as the voice of Hot Shot (replacing Brent Miller), Paul Dobson as the Voices of Overhaul (episodes 1 to 16) and Landmine (replacing Ward Perry), Scott McNeil as the voices of Snarl and Backstop, Brian Dobson reprising the role of Red Alert, Richard Newman as the voice of Vector Prime, Michael Dobson returning as Starscream, Ted Cole as the voice of Sideways (replacing Paul Dobson), Peter Kelamis as the voice of Wing Saber (replacing Colin Murdock), and Lisa Ann Beley as the voice of Override.

In the anime, all of the Transformers are computer-generated, while the humans and backgrounds are rendered in traditional cel animation. Telecom Animation Film Company helped with the backgrounds. It was the last series in the Transformers franchise to be produced in Japan until the release of Transformers Go! in 2013.

== Plot ==
Our worlds are in danger! To save them and the galaxy, we must find the four Cyber Planet Keys before the Decepticons can use them for evil! It is our mission! Hot Shot! Jetfire! Vector Prime! Landmine! Scattershot! Optimus Prime! Transform and roll out!

— Optimus Prime, in the opening title sequence

Animation is a combination of computer-rendering for robots and special effects, and hand-drawn animation for humans and most backgrounds.

When the destruction of Unicron results in the formation of a massive black hole, the planet Cybertron, home world of the Transformers, is threatened, and its population is evacuated to Earth, taking the forms of local vehicles and machinery to hide from humanity. As this occurs, Optimus Prime's elite team of Autobot warriors are approached by the ancient Transformer Vector Prime, who has emerged from his resting place in the void outside of time to inform them of the legendary Cyber Planet Keys, ancient artifacts of power which can stop the black hole and save the universe. Lost due to an accident during an attempt to create a cross-universal space bridge network, the Cyber Planet Keys now reside on four worlds somewhere in the universe – unfortunately, Vector Prime's map showing their location is stolen by the Decepticon leader Megatron, and both forces relocate to Earth as the race to find them begins.

Megatron races Override.

On Earth, the Autobots befriend three human children named Coby, Bud and Lori who aid them in locating the Omega Lock, the focusing device for the Cyber Planet Key's power. With new "Cyber Key Powers" awakened in them, the Transformers battle on many fronts, searching for the Lock on Earth while Hot Shot and Red Alert head for Velocitron, the Speed Planet which is the resting place of the first key and most of its inhabitants have racing vehicles modes. It is here that Megatron recruits known troublemakers Ransack and Crumplezone into the Decepticons. As Hot Shot competes in the planet's grand racing championship to win the key from the planet's leader Override, the Lock is located on Earth in the bulk of the crashed Transformer's spaceship the Atlantis. Overhaul heads for Animatros the Jungle Planet which is the home of the Transformers who have beast modes. The power of Animatros' Cyber Planet Key reformats Overhaul into Leobreaker. Megatron ingratiates himself with Jungle Planet's own dictator Scourge while his scheming lieutenant Starscream teams up with the mysterious Sideways, working towards his own goals.

Ultimately, the Autobots succeed in acquiring the Keys of both Velocitron and Jungle Planet, at which point the existence of Earth's own Cyber Planet Key is revealed. Starscream makes his power play and overthrows Megatron, stealing the Omega Lock and all three keys from the Autobots and using them to grow in size and power. With their forces bolstered by the ancient Autobots from Earth and the arrival of Wing Saber, who combines with Optimus Prime, the Autobots fight their way through a vengeful Megatron and defeat Starscream – but the battle is not without casualties, as Hot Shot, Red Alert and Scattershot are gravely wounded and rebuilt into the even more powerful "Cybertron Defense Team".

Upon returning to Cybertron, the Autobots use the Omega Lock and Cyber Planet Keys, which awakens the spirit of Primus, the deity who is creator of the Transformers, and Cybertron itself actually transforms into the god's body. After a battle in which Starscream taps the power of Primus and grows to planetary size – only to be defeated by Primus himself – the location of the fourth and final key is determined as Gigantion the Giant Planet which is the homeworld of the Minicons and the Transformers who are larger than normal while having construction vehicle modes. Gigantion, however, exists in another dimension, having fallen through a rift in space/time, and except for the kids and the Minicons, the others can't enter without having their minds separated from their bodies. Luckily, Red Alert has created a vaccine program (based on Technology from Vector Prime's sword) to help but it is revealed that Jetfire has Trypanophobia and while the Autobots are able to reach the planet, the Decepticons are led there by the enigmatic Soundwave. Bested by the planet's leader Metroplex, Megatron taps the key's power to become Galvatron, and Sideways and Soundwave reveal themselves to be inhabitants of Planet X, a world destroyed by the Gigantions, upon whom they seek revenge. Galvatron blasts them and Starscream into another dimension and acquires the Lock and Keys for himself, intending to use their power to accelerate the universal degeneration caused by the black hole and remake the cosmos in his own image. Vector Prime sacrifices his life to allow the Autobots to return to their home universe, and the five planet leaders confront Galvatron within the black hole and defeat him. With all the Cyber Planet Keys now in his possession, Primus uses their power to finally seal the black hole, ending its threat.

As the planet's various civilizations attempt to return to life as normal, Galvatron attacks the Autobots for one final time. Without any troops to call his own, Galvatron engages Optimus Prime in a one-on-one duel, and is finally destroyed for good. As Galvatron is dying, he places his fist on Optimus' chest and says his final words. In the Japanese dub, he says "Galaxy Convoy..." which is Optimus' name in the Japanese version of the show. His last words in the American dub, however, are "I still function. You haven't won. Not while my spark still burns..." As he starts chuckling evilly, Optimus says "You fought well. Goodbye, Galvatron." As Galvatron disintegrates to space dust, Optimus kneels in front of Vector Prime's sword that Optimus used to slay Galvatron, still injured. As Jetfire and the others run over to Optimus to check on him, Optimus says "Don't worry. You won't get rid of me that easily." Galvatron is later seen in the credits of the last episode engaging Vector Prime in battle in the hereafter. With this final victory, Optimus Prime begins a new space bridge initiative, and the Transformers set sail for the four corners of the universe, and new adventures.

=== Cyber Planet Keys ===
Cyber Planet Keys (Planet Force in Galaxy Force) are four mystical items that form the crux of Transformers: Cybertron's plot; in order to stop the black hole that is threatening the universe, the Autobots must gather all four. Also seeking to attain them are the Decepticons, who want to use their power for their own ends.

The Cyber Planet Keys are formed from the spark of Primus and were used eons ago in the Space Bridge project that was meant to link all populated planets together. They were carried to various planets by four Cybertronian spacecraft, the Atlantis, the Ogygia, the Hyperborea, and the Lemuria. All four are controlled by a device called the Omega Lock, and when they are all inserted, they awaken Primus's power.

Unfortunately, the effort failed and the four Cyber Planet Keys were lost. They would remain that way for eons, until the black hole threatened Cybertron. At that point, Vector Prime emerged and told the story of the Keys to the Autobots. Eventually, they agreed to attempt Vector Prime's plan. Unfortunately, Megatron also learned of the scheme and began his own effort to gain the Planet Keys.

The Cyber Planet Keys were each marked with a symbol and colored gold. The four Cyber Planet Keys were found on Earth, Velocitron, Jungle Planet, and Gigantion.

- On Velocitron, the Key was disguised as a racing trophy.
- On Jungle Planet, it was disguised as a dragon statue in Scourge's lair.
- The Earth Key was possessed and hidden by Evac in ice.
- The Giant Planet Key lay at the very center of planet in the spaceship Lemuria.

Finally, the Autobots found the Cyber Planet Keys and the Omega Lock, and awoke Primus, who shut down the black hole, saving Cybertron and the universe. The four planets started a new space bridge project, and, finally, peace was restored.

== Characters ==
=== Autobots ===
==== Cybertronian Autobots ====
Optimus Prime
Voiced by: Garry Chalk
As the Great Commander of the Autobot military, Supreme Commander Optimus Prime (Sō Shireikan Galaxy Convoy - General Commander Galaxy Convoy) organizes the evacuation of Cybertron's inhabitants to Earth when the Energon Sun went supernova. Although stern and methodical, he is a compassionate leader who deeply cares for each of his subordinates. At first, Prime is firmly opposed to interacting with the natives of the worlds the Autobots visit with the intent of ensuring that no inhabitants of Cybertron socialize or meet the inhabitants of other worlds, but soon comes to realize the benefits of the allies the Autobots gain. Prime transforms into a fire engine, and can convert into a secondary flight mode, or merge with his trailer into Super Mode. Later using the Matrix of Leadership replacing the role of the Spark of Combination, he combines with his fellow Autobot comrade Overhaul who is transformed before this while on Animatron into his Jungle Planet incarnation, Leobreaker, to form Savage Claw Mode (Liger Convoy), and with Wing Saber to form Sonic Wing Mode (Kosoku Kido Sō Shireikan Sonic Convoy - High-speed Mobility General Commander Sonic Convoy) though the Autobots claim when Prime and Leobraker combine for the first time, "I didn't know Autobots could do that". Whether he or Galvatron are the stronger or if both are in perfect balance is unknown, as although Prime did ultimately destroy Galvatron in one final blow, it was with Vector Prime's sword, given to him in the last few seconds before they clashed for the last time. His Cyber Key Power makes his cannons more powerful ("Galaxy Cannon: Full Burst!). In Savage Claw Mode, his Cyber Key Power ability takes the form of a special wrist-equipped claw flipping into position followed by Prime energizing with green-colored energy, jetting across the ground at an incredible speed and then skidding thunderously while smashing his claw-equipped fist into a target (Liger Grand Break); in Sonic Wing Mode, it sees Wing Saber's own Cyber Key-powered ability be used by Prime in a way that the ability is intensified in strength, power and presentation after Wing Saber combines (Galaxy Caliber) with another Cyber Key ability being Sonic Double Impact Galaxy Caliber. When he uses Sparkdrinker in Super Mode, he uses Galaxy Giga Crush.
Jetfire
Voiced by: Brian Drummond
As Optimus Prime's second-in-command, Jetfire (Dreadrock) always follows orders but is willing to take matters into his own hands to get things done. Now having picked up the native accent of the planet Nebulos (similar to the Australian accent), Jetfire transforms into a cargo plane based on an An-225 Cossack and can unleash seriously powerful firepower through a back-mounted double-barrel cannon through the use of his Cyber Key Power (Dread Cannon - Full Burst, Afterburner Blast Attack in English dub). He also has a turbine wind attack (Jetstream, Turbine Wave in the English dub). In one episode it is revealed that he has a fear of needles. He became leader of Cybertron after Optimus Prime leaves for the Space Bridge Project. Originally Scott McNeil was going to return as Jetfirei in Cybertron but was replaced by Brian Drummond due to wanting him to have an Australian accent, ironically Scott was born in Australia.
Landmine
Voiced by: Paul Dobson
Back in the day, before he joined Rodimus Prime, the elderly Landmine (Guardshell) trained many young Autobots, including his old friend Mudflap and Optimus Prime himself. During the opening stages of the crisis that sprung up around the black hole, Landmine was transported to Earth by Vector Prime to save him from the black hole's power, where he met and befriended the three human children who became the Autobots' allies. He transforms into a payloader, and can generate whirlwinds with the bladed wheels unleashed by his Cyber Key Power (Tornado Cutter, Cyber Tempest in the English dub). He also seems to be an homage to the Autobot-allegianced Scavenger from Armada in transformation and role (as Optimus' mentor), in fact, He was previously voiced by Scavenger's voice actor, Ward Perry in the previous series.
Mudflap
Voiced by: Dale Wilson
Mudflap (Demolishor) was an Autobot mentored by Landmine who was among those who evacuated from Cybertron and went into hiding on Earth. Growing dissatisfied with the Autobots' mission and human customs, he was persuaded by Starscream to join up with the Decepticons in a misguided attempt to try and save the galaxy without worrying about the affairs of humans. However, he found he could not stomach the Decepticon way of doing things and ultimately left them; consumed with guilt over what he had done, he was given a second chance and welcomed back into the Autobot fold by Landmine. He speaks with a French accent. Mudflap transforms into a crane truck. His Cyber Key extends his crane arm and deploys a massive saw blade (Mega Crane Blade) and also activates an arm-mounted missile-launcher.
Wing Saber
Voiced by: Peter Kelamis
Wing Saber (Sonic Bomber named for the Zone Autobot) was first seen in Energon as a rebuilt Wing Dagger who could combine with Optimus Prime to form a Sonic Wing Mode which, in Energon, could be formed in one of two modes between the more-used flight configuration and the less-seen ground configuration but would be visualized in Cybertron as this choice of two modes of assembly being gone. Between the events of Energon and Cybertron, Wing Saber let his powers and the Autobots' victory get to his CPU. They had a little trouble rescuing a lost human astronaut from an asteroid belt near planet Chaar. From there, Wing Saber broke every rule in the Autobots' standards, he even attacked Optimus. After the Energon Sun turned into the Grand Black Hole, Wing Saber's memories were warped by the hole's space-time distortion. He came back as soon as the Autobots and Decepticons tried to take the Omega Lock from Starscream, forcing him and Optimus to combine. In Cybertron, Wing Saber transforms into an A-10 Thunderbolt II.

===== Cybertron Defense Team =====
Cybertron Defense Team (Vanguard Team) is the name of Hot Shot, Red Alert and Scattershot after they reformat their bodies with new combat-themed vehicle modes. While each member's Cybertron Defense form's Cyber Key ability is unique, the entire team can align into a triangular formation and unite their Cyber Key Powers in a special Triangle Attack against a single foe such as Galvatron or Gigantion's resident Menasor. For a time during the first half of Cybertron, their vehicle modes did not share the same theme. But later, after Megatron overpowers them, the three Autobots, begin calling to the Omega Lock. Its power transforms them into new bodies and subsequently new vehicle modes. In this team-shared new form, each team member bears a combat design and instantly gains. From this visual rebirth of their bodies, equipped with new benefits, they are ready to continue Cybertron with extra attack powers that serve them well over timee as the series crosses its halfway point.

Hot Shot
Voiced by: Kirby Morrow
The brash youth of the Autobots, Hot Shot (Exilion/Exigazer) has a need for speed. An avid racer, he takes pride in the fact that he considers himself the fastest in the universe. Once on Velocitron, the Speed Planet, however, Hot Shot finds his title challenged by the planet leader Override, leading to many races and a personal conflict between duty and ego. Later in the series, after being damaged by Megatron, he is upgraded by the Omega Lock's power into a new armored vehicle form as part of the Cybertron Defense Team. Hot Shot becomes the leader of Velocitron when Override is gone, even though he is still an armored APC. The black hole wiped him of his memories of what he was and did in Armada and Energon. Hot Shot initially transformed into a swift sportscar that could be boosted to even greater speeds through his Cyber Key Power (Accel Wing) - his Cyber Key, despite Hot Shot not being a resident of Velocitron, would be based on the Speed Planet's Cyber Planet Key. After being upgraded, he now transforms into a military APC armed with multiple missile launchers, and his Cyber Key Power ability becomes a full-power scatter blast of every firing weapon in Hot Shot's body (Double X Shot) with one of Hot Shot's Cybertron Defense form's basic weapons being a dagger for close battle (Battle Dagger).
Scattorshot
Voiced by: Richard Ian Cox
The Autobots' main technical expert, Scattorshot (Backpack/Backgild) spends most of his time in the base analyzing monitors. Though he can handle his duties with precision, he is known for being quite nervous and unsure of himself. After being damaged by Megatron, he was upgraded by the Omega Lock and made a member of the Cybertron Defense Team, becoming more sure of himself. He speaks with a Southern accent (which possibly is a homage to Ironhide). Prior to his reformatting, Scattorshot transformed into a half-track missile launcher vehicle with Cyber Key Power grenades ("Ground Shot Up"/"Land Shot", Missile Storm in the English dub). In his recreated form as a missile launcher tank, his Cyber Key Power transforms his launchers into a powerful rifle and rocket launcher ("Twin Search Missile" in Galaxy Force).
Red Alert
Voiced by: Brian Dobson
Red Alert (First Aid/First Gunner) is the Autobot Medical Expert and Chief Science Officer, as well as a long-time veteran of the Cybertronian wars. After the events of Armada and Energon, he gained a British accent. When Red Alert and Hot Shot were sent to Velocitron, his matter-of-factness lead him to clash with the younger Autobot. Later, like Hot Shot and Scattorshot, he gained a new form after being damaged by Megatron and became part of the elite Cybertron Defense Team. Red Alert initially transforms into an ambulance armed with an electron wrench, a repair hammer, and two Photon Beam cannons activated by his Cyber Key (Photon Beam). After reformatting, he became an armored missile launching vehicle, equipped with a massive missile that generates powerful energy blasts (Giga Vanisher).

==== Velocitron Autobots ====
The Cybertronian starship called the Ogygia came to rest on a barren world, which its inhabitants soon dubbed Velocitron, the Speed Planet. The world was decorated with vast race tracks, and the starship's occupants spent their days competing in races until, by the present day, their descendants filled their time with nothing but. The entire culture of Velocitron is built around racing and speed, and its Cyber Planet Key is, naturally, a racing trophy that can only be acquired by defeating the planet's leader.

Override
Voiced by: Lisa Ann Beley (earlier episodes), Nicole Oliver (later episodes)
Long-time ruler of Velocitron, Sound-Speed Commander Override (On-Soku Shireikan Nitro Convoy)'s life is dominated by racing, to the extent that she would not impart information or even hold a conversation with anyone if they did not face her in a race. When Hot Shot arrived on Velocitron, the noble goals of the young Autobot swayed her to their side, and she joined the Autobots in the greatest race of all - the race to save the galaxy. Override transforms into a race car (most likely a Lotus), and her Cyber Key Power allows her to boost her engine speed (Nitro Boost). She is armed with a double-barrelled blaster activated by her Cyber Key (Mach Shot). Override was originally conceived as a male character, and appears as such as in the original Japanese counterpart of Cybertron. Cartoon Network's desire that the show have a greater female presence saw Hasbro recast Override as a female - a change that, though seeming sheer coincidence, functions very well, given the character's friendship with Lori and rivalry with Thunderblast.
Clocker
Voiced by: Brian Dobson
A young and spunky denizen of Velocitron, Clocker (Skids) is a student of the racing master Brakedown, who met and befriended Hot Shot when the young Cybertronian Autobot came to Speed Planet. He transforms into a convertible race car, and his Cyber Key activated a double-barrelled blaster (Smash Burner). He was in the race for the Cyber Key but was dropped after the second race.
Brakedown
Voiced by: Michael Dobson
One of the oldest residents of Speed Planet and a friend and teacher to Clocker, Brakedown (Autolander)'s wisdom as an experienced racer gives him a different perspective on situation than others, making him invaluable to young racers in training, with his act of allying with the Autobots after Hot Shot's arrival also offering him further experience. He transforms into a dragster, and his Cyber Key activates a bladed weapon (Motor Blade). His relationship with Hot Shot is comparable to Hot Rod and Kup both from the original G1 cartoon. He was in the Cyber Key race, but was dropped after the desert race.
Dirt Boss
Voiced by: Michael Donovan
Dirt Boss (Inch-Up) is the most specialized Transformer on Speed Planet when it comes to traveling on multiple terrains, from bumpy, uneven paths to muddy quagmires. He hates Override and seeks to defeat her in a race, which proved to be all the reason he needed to join up with Megatron's Decepticon forces. Defeated in the race for Velocitron's Cyber Planet Key, he broke off his ties with Megatron. He transforms into a monster truck, but can convert to a "high speed mode" with a widened wheelbase through the power of his Cyber Key. In robot mode, his Key deploys twin shoulder blasters (Shoulder Vulcan).

==== Jungle Planet Autobots ====
When the Autobot starship Hyperborea landed on the lush, green world of Jungle Planet dotted with jungles, sentient plants, and volcanoes, the ship's occupants adopted animal alternate modes. But as time wore on, they and their descendants took on the characteristics of the beasts they mimicked, becoming segregated and bestial. With parties of violent raiders attacking the weaker inhabitants, a feudal law of "Might makes right" came into effect, making the already untamed wilds of the planet even more dangerous.

Scourge
Voiced by: Trevor Devall
As a former student of the master Backstop, Dark Commander Scourge (Ankoku Shireikan Flame Convoy) sought to bring peace to the Jungle Planet, but in using his vast strength to crush all opposition and accomplish his goal, he lost sight of his teacher's ideals and ruled the world through intimidation and shows of power. Hardened and cruel, Scourge espouses the mantra of "Might makes right", but he found his ideals challenged by Leobreaker and the Autobots. When he was ultimately defeated in combat by Optimus Prime, his pride and jealousy motivated him to join the Decepticons (taking over Starscream's position as Megatron's second-in-command), but the hard lessons from Lori, Bud, and the Autobots he would learn would eventually turn him to the side of light. Scourge transforms into a quadrupedal land dragon. His tail becomes an axe for his Robot Mode weapon, while his Cyber Key deploys two extra dragon-like heads over his shoulders in both modes, unleashing a deadly stream of fire breath and instantly visualizing Scourge's Beast Mode as a three-headed dragon.
Overhaul/Leobreaker
Overhal Voiced by: Paul Dobson
Leobreaker Voiced by: Dave "Squatch" Ward
Overhaul (Jackshot) was once a famous Autobot soldier with a reputation for winning seemingly impossible battles. However, he was considered a loose cannon and thus felt alone. As a member of Optimus Prime's team, however, he realized he wasn't completely without friends or allies. Stranded on the Jungle Planet where he was saved from an earthquake by Backstop, Overhaul engaged the planet's leader Scourge in battle and called out to the power of the world's Cyber Planet Key when badly damaged during his defense of Snarl against the leader's attacks, which reformatted him into the bestial Leobreaker (Ligerjack). His doubts cause Nemesis Breaker to be born and Megatron gains a Dark Claw Mode transformation. Ever since he became Leobreaker he tried to take down Scourge in with the intent of making him pay for his unrighteous ways and the abuse of his role as Animatron's leader as an unfair planet leader towards his own people. As Overhaul, he transformed into a military offroad SUV for his Earth disguise and his Cyber Key Power allowed him to launch a piledriving missile from his chest ("Anchor Shot", Slam Attack in the English dub). Reborn as his new identity of Leobreaker, he gained a lion alternate mode and deadly Cyber Key Power claws (Platinum Claw, as well as Ultra Liger Drop) and could now combine with Optimus Prime into Savage Claw Mode (Liger Convoy, with the Force Chip special attack Liger Grand Break).
Backstop
Voiced by: Scott McNeil
A zen master of combat, Backstop (Saidos) trained the weaker fighters of Jungle Planet but at the same time advocated the values of fighting only when necessary and striving for peace rather than fighting for fighting's sake - these were values that his student Scourge could not accept and he left Backstop's tutelage; when Overhaul from Optimus Prime's Cybertronian Autobots arrived on the planet, Backstop and his last remaining student Snarl trained him, and sided with Optimus Prime's forces in the battle to save the galaxy. He transforms into a black rhinoceros and his Cyber Key extends his horn into a bladed battering-ram (Bloody Horn). He speaks in an African accent.
Snarl
Voiced by: Scott McNeil
As Backstop's student, Snarl (Fang Wolf) was formerly friends with the planet's recent leader, Scourge. He stayed at Scourge's side to keep an eye on his old friend, until Overhaul arrived on the planet and Snarl was branded a traitor for helping him. He formed a connection with Overhaul and eventually left his planet to help Optimus Prime save the universe. He transforms into a wolf, with two armor-piercing fangs activated by his Cyber Key (Power Fang).
Undermine
Voiced by: Mark Oliver
One of Scourge's troops, Undermine (Dinoshout) is somewhat shifty and underhanded. For a voice, he speaks with a German-like accent. He transforms into a Spinosaurus with a flail weapon for a tail, and his Cyber Key Power deploys a blade from his head fin (Crest Sword, Horn Blade in the English dub) that serves as his beast mode's sail.
Brimstone
Voiced by: Terry Klassen
One of Scourge's troops, Brimstone (Tera Shaver) isn't very bright, and relies on Undermine and his leader to do the thinking for him. He transforms into a Pteranodon and his Cyber Key deploys twin blades from his wings (Slash Knife).

==== Earth Autobots ====
Eons ago, as part of a program to create a space bridge network linking planets across the universe, four Transformer starships departed for the four corners of the galaxy, each carrying with them a Cyber Planet Key - the starship known as the Atlantis came to Earth, hovering in the skies above the world before a malfunction caused it to crash into the ocean, giving rise to the human legend of the sunken continent of that name. The descendants of the Transformers aboard the Atlantis mostly entered stasis before the present day, though a few of those descendants continued to operate in secret.

Evac
Voiced by: Bill Mondy
Guardian of Earth's Cyber Planet Key, Aerial Commander Evac (Koku Shireikan Live Convoy) has existed secretly on the planet for many years, repeatedly switching alternate modes and aiding humans in danger - one such human was a young boy named Franklin, leading the child to pursue knowledge of Transformers for years afterwards. Evac transforms into a rescue helicopter, and his Cyber Key activates a set of thrusters (Jet Booster) that can also launch missiles (Falling Missile/Homing Missile/Jet Missile, depending on his mood).
Crosswise
Voiced by: Michael Donovan
When Decepticons descended from those on the Atlantis began threatening burgeoning humanity, Crosswise (Autovolt) took on the role of "Monster Hunter" and dedicated himself to capturing and imprisoning them. He succeeded in sealing the Decepticons in stasis beneath the ice fields of Alaska but he too was trapped, frozen in ice, until Earth's military uncovered him in the present day. Crosswise transforms into a car resembling a Bugatti Veyron, and his Cyber Key activates a set of twin missile launchers (Force Missile). Originally, Crosswise was intended to be called "Smokescreen", leading to a production mistake that saw him referred to by this name during the original airings of his debut episodes on Kids' WB, but however, by the time these episodes premiered on Cartoon Network, the dialogue had been re-edited to give him his correct name, "Crosswise" - the mistake was then drafted into a toy.<
Lugnutz
Voiced by: Michael Adamthwaite
Although he was one of the Decepticons freed by Starscream, Lugnutz (Roadstorm) had very little interest in actually fighting for him. He's a very easy-going 'bot with a relaxed, hippie-like attitude that means he would rather be cruising Earth's highways than fighting Autobots. If any of them were to get in his way, though, he wouldn't be averse to blowing them away with his rifle, Dutch. He transforms into a motorcycle, armed with a grenade launcher activated by his Cyber Key (Side Machine Gun).

==== Gigantion Autobots ====
The fourth and final Autobot ship, the Lemuria, landed safely on this world, the Giant Planet. Some time into the colonisation of the planet, it fell victim to a tear in reality and slipped through a wormhole into another dimension where it was attacked by the warmongering inhabitants of the vile Planet X. Through the power of their Cyber Planet Key, the planet's inhabitants became gigantic in size and fought back, leaving Planet X with no option but to use their mightiest weapon, only to wind up destroying themselves in the process. Saddened by their planetary level of destruction, the Gigantions dedicated themselves to construction, covering their planet with gargantuan cities which they completed and then abandoned, moving on to the next project. To continue this ongoing task, they built new layers on top of the cities, repeating the process over and over, until the planet itself was colossal. In addition to the giant Transformers, Gigantion is also populated by Mini-Cons, who perform the small, intricate, detailed tasks of construction that the larger robots cannot.

For whatever reason, all the inhabitants of Gigantion speak with Scottish, German and Irish accents.

Metroplex
Voiced by: Ron Halder
The leader of the Transformers on Giant Planet, Open-Mind Commander Metroplex (Kyoshin Shireikan Megalo Convoy) is the largest of the large, the bravest of the brave and the kindest of the kind. In the English dub, he speaks with a Scottish accent. He is physically powerful enough to best Megatron in mere seconds (an unequaled feat amongst the Transformers of this era), and joined up with the Autobots almost as quickly. He transforms into a bucket wheel excavator, and wields a gigantic axe named as Sparkdrinker. He can also assume a smaller "work mode" for more precise tasks. He functions as a coordinator and plans all of the Mini-Con work in Gigantion - many of those Mini-Cons consider him the leader of their planet. Metroplex lends Optimus Prime his Sparkdrinker for Optimus to use as a bludgeoning weapon (Galaxy Giga Crush). His Cyber Key powers up Sparkdrinker (Megalo Crush/Axe Crusher), or he can throw it like a boomerang (albeit of a very big kind) (Megalo Boomerang).
Drillbit
Drillbit (Horribull) is Metroplex's Mini-Con partner who becomes a drilling vehicle. He can mount on Metroplex's right arm or the back of his Sparkdrinker.
Quickmix
Voiced by: Michael Daingerfield
Quickmix (Blender) is Metroplex's right-hand man and knows "a lot about a lot". His skill is as an advisor and a technical worker, but he can fight just as well as anyone, with a Cyber Key Power that transforms the drum of his concrete mixer alternate mode into a blaster (Mixing Cannon).
Stripmine
Stripmine (Killbull) is Quickmix's Mini-Con partner who transforms into a mining vehicle. He helps to operate Quickmix while the latter is in vehicle mode. Stripmine's function is Heavy Machine Operations.
Menasor
Voiced by: Samuel Vincent
A young Gigantion resident who wanted to change his world's seemingly "out-dated" philosophy by force, Menasor (Moledive) fell prey to Megatron's influence and joined his Decepticons. Unable to harm his own Mini-Con partner, he saw that he would only hurt Gigantion and so joined Metroplex and the Autobots. He transforms into a large-scale drilling machine. His Cyber Key power increases the power of his drills with an enhancement in strength. His Force Chip special attack is Giant Drill.
Heavy Load
Heavy Load (Bull Bull) is Menasor's Mini-Con partner who transforms into a dump truck. He showed him the error of his ways by leaping in front of Menasor's own drill.

==== Ancient Transformers ====
Vector Prime
Voiced by: Richard Newman
As one of the first thirteen Transformers created by the race's deity Primus, Vector Prime hails from the very beginning of Cybertron. Having removed himself from the linear universe eons ago, he existed outside of time, watching over the multiverse until the threat of the black hole emerged, forcing him to return to Cybertron and alert Optimus Prime's Autobots to the power of the Cyber Planet Keys. But at last, Vector Prime sacrifices himself to save Cybertron and open the warp gate. Vector Prime transforms into an ancient Cybertronian spaceship. His sword, Rhisling, is sharp enough to rend the fabric of space and time and open portals to anywhere in the galaxy, while his Cyber Key Power generates a protective forcefield (Repulsion Field, Tachyon Shield in the English dub, other powers are Time Relief and Action Field) which he rarely uses.
Safeguard
Safeguard is Vector Prime's Mini-Con partner and scout. He transforms into an ancient Cybertronian jet and the nose section of his vehicle mode is designed as being a blaster so that Vector Prime may use Safeguard's vehicle mode as an attack armament for his own vehicle mode or a wrist-mounted firing weapon in Robot Mode. Safeguard is the guardian of the Mini-Con Recon Team, who he encountered on his journey. Also stranded along with the Recon Team, Safeguard bonded with Vector Prime when he rescued them and became his personal partner.

==== Recon Mini-Con Team ====
This trio of Mini-Cons hails from Gigantion but were stranded in space and time when a game of hide and seek went away. Discovered by Vector Prime, they were brought to Earth by him, where they quickly befriended the Autobots' human allies Bud, Coby and Lori due to having minds that function like human children's.

Jolt
Voiced by: Brian Drummond
Transforms into a helicopter and is obsessed with Earth culture, from television to movies to the internet. Jolt is the only Mini-Con who can speak English. His Japanese name is Hop.
Six-Speed
Transforms into a 2003 Bentley Speed. His Japanese name is Bullet, but due to Japanese pronunciation was misspelt on the subtitles as Blit
Reverb
Transforms into a pick-up truck. His Japanese name is Bumper

==== Other Autobots ====
Cobybot
The Cobybot (Coby Ramble in Galaxy Force) is a Scrapmetal that Coby Hansen refitted as his own pilotable Transformer in the Cybertron series. Like most of the Scrapmetals, the Cobybot transforms into a "spider-tank" vehicle. Its special attack is Certain-Death Coby Shot. A Coby Ramble toy was released as part of the EX-02 Sonic Convoy, which is a giftset that was released exclusively for Toys "R" Us Japan. A reviewer at TFORMER (a division of Entertainment News International) noted that the Coby Ramble toy was simply a "remold and repaint". Another Galaxy Force Coby Ramble toy, a remold of the Scrapmetal toy, was made exclusively for Takara.

=== Decepticons ===
==== Cybertron Decepticons ====
Megatron/Galvatron
Voiced by: David Kaye
Trapped within an energon star at the conclusion of Energon, Megatron (Master Megatron) was freed from his imprisonment when the star collapsed into the massive black hole that threatened Cybertron. Having absorbed the remnants of Unicron's armor and power into his own body, Megatron is now arguably the most powerful Decepticon and seeks to use the power of the Cyber Planet Keys and the black hole to remold the universe in his own image. Despite recruiting natives from all the different worlds that the Transformers visited, Megatron was continuously met with failure, but upon his defeat by Metroplex on Gigantion, his Armor of Unicron tapped into the world's Cyber Planet Key and upgraded him into the insanely powerful Galvatron (Master Galvatron). He won more battles as Galvatron and stole the completed Omega Lock for many episodes. Megatron is a Triple Changer whose vehicle modes are a Batmobile-like dragster for ground travel and a Cybertronian jet for flight. He can project devastating electrical blasts from his hands, and his Cyber Key activates many powers, including vehicle-mode thrusters, a claw shield (Death Claw) and his deadly Death Machine Gun, with which he fatally injured Hot Shot, Red Alert and Scattershot. He could also combine with Nemesis Breaker to form Dark Claw Mode (Liger Megatron) for a short period of time with a similar Cyber Key power to Optimus Prime's Savage Claw Mode's own Cyber Key Power attack (Liger Death Strike). As Galvatron, he retained all his previous powers and abilities and could project and shape dark energy into a sword. In his final battle with Optimus Prime, he gained a new transformation in which his back wings/cape formed a cannon on his chest which fired dark electrical energy (Death Cannon). His armor can also restore him.
Thundercracker
Voiced by: Mark Oliver
The only Decepticon to take on an Earth mode, Thundercracker was first mentioned in Armada when Starscream was contemplating his supercharged color scheme. When Cybertron came to air, Thundercracker was an enthusiastic fighter somewhat lacking in intelligence and combat skills who spoke in a Southern drawl accent. He has a tendency to come up with grand but largely ineffective special attacks (The Japanese version has him parodying lines said in Mecha anime characters), and would rather be a winner than be evil. He transforms into a Su-27 Flanker, and his Cyber Key activates the blaster in place of his left arm and a back-mounted gun on his vehicle mode's back (Thunder Hell, English: Thunder Cannon /Super Hell Special Deluxe/Big Spinning Thunder Hell Scattering Fireworks, English: Rain of Ultimate Destruction/Sure Kill Ultra Hurricane Slash And Crush Shoot, English: Triple Spinnin' Laser Willmaker/Drill Spinning Thunder Hell Electric Drop/Hissatu! Super Electric Lightning Shock Electric Thunder Cracker Punch!, English: Super Electric Lighting Thundercrackin' Punch/Hyper Ultra Big Missile Full Burst Maximum Alpha!/Hyper Ultra Big Missile Full Burst Maximum Beta Two). The Decepticons often ride on him a lot.
Starscream
Voiced by: Michael Dobson
Also freed from the sun upon its collapse, Starscream assumed the position of Megatron's second-in-command. But his experiences throughout the Armada and Energon conflicts had shaped Starscream into a bitter character with his own ambitions, and he sought to acquire the power of the Cyber Planet Keys for himself. Scheming with the mysterious Sideways, Starscream liberated the ancient Decepticons trapped on Earth and acquired the Omega Lock and three Cyber Planet Keys, allowing him to tap the power of Primus and grow to a gigantic height. Operating as a third factor in the remainder of the conflict, Starscream battled with Megatron, Optimus Prime and even Primus himself by growing skyscraper size and planet size.

==== Velocitron Decepticons ====
Crumplezone/Dark Crumplezone
Voiced by: Mark Acheson
This big green brawler is the muscular half of the "Gruesome Twosome" and is hardly ever seen without his partner Ransack. Crumplezone (Landbullet) is not especially bright, but his bulky frame possesses incredible speed when in his three-wheeled Cybertronian dragster mode, and great strength in robot mode. During a later battle on Cybertron, he was badly injured by a horde of Scrapmetal. Megatron used the power of his Unicron Armor to reformat him into Dark Crumplezone (Armbullet). His Cyber Key Power activates a pair of missile launchers that flip from his back onto his shoulders in robot mode and, while flipping into position in vehicle mode while he is Crumplezone, would have the added effect of flipping special wings mounted on the sides of his vehicle mode's back (Land Bazooka, Arm Bazooka after his upgrade). In the final Planet Cup race, he modified himself to give himself extra speed (Ultra Tune Level 2 Ignition) but still lost.
Ransack
Voiced by: Louis Chirillo
The smaller and more "intelligent" member of the "Gruesome Twosome" (although that's not saying much), Ransack (Gasket) makes up for his small size in nimbleness, agility, fairly quick wits and the fact that he has a bigger partner who beats up people for him. He transforms into a motorcycle with Cyber-Key-activated boosters that act as a double-barrelled cannon in robot mode (Exhaust Shot/Exhaust Boost). In the final Planet Cup race, he modified himself to give himself extra speed (Reverse Tune Ignition) but still lost.

==== Jungle Planet Decepticons ====
Nemesis Breaker
An evil doppelganger of Leobreaker who was born from Leobreaker's doubts and the dark power contained in Megatron's Unicron Armor. Nemesis Breaker (Dark Ligerjack) can combine with Megatron into Dark Claw Mode (Liger Megatron, with the Liger Death Strike Force Chip attack), in opposition to Optimus's Savage Claw Mode. Nemesis Breaker's transforms into a black lion. His Cyber Key power is the same as Leobreaker's own. He is more beast than Transformer and only speaks through growls and roars. Ultimately, he was destroyed by Metroplex, returning him to the darkness from whence he came.

==== Earth Decepticons ====
The Earth Decepticons are the descendants of Transformers who came to Earth on the starship Atlantis. The Ancient Earth Decepticons were sealed away by Crosswise but later freed by Starscream.

Thunderblast
Voiced by: Maryke Hendrikse
Thunderblast (Chromia) is an ancient female Transformer who was locked up by Crosswise and initially served Starscream, but turned to Megatron's side based on how hunky he was. She has a flighty, fun-loving, girlish personality, but ultimately, her only loyalty is to herself, and she will join whomever is most powerful. She transforms into a speedboat, and her Cyber Key transforms her missile launcher weapon into an even larger rocket launcher (Phantom Wave). She is also lava impervious as she once swam on it and she is a master of water travel.

==== Planet X Decepticons ====
Planet X was home to weapon manufacturers/dealers, thieves, murderers and villains of all walks of life who took their planet on a voyage of galactic conquest and destruction - this voyage comes to an end, however, when Planet X encounters Gigantion and destroys itself in the ensuing war. The scattered survivors of Planet X allied themselves with Unicron in hopes of attaining revenge on the Giant Planet in the future, and served his will by acting as enigmatic operatives of misdirection and distrust amongst the Transformers.

Sideways
Voiced by: Ted Cole
This master of deception had previously served Unicron by acting as an avatar for his Spark during the war for the Mini-Cons in Armada and was preserved by his dark power following his seeming death at the end of that conflict. Returning during the search for the Cyber Planet Keys, Sideways (Noisemaze) aligned himself with Starscream, considering him the best chance he had at revenge against Gigantion. Sideways transforms into a Cybertronian spacecraft following his return. His Cyber Key activates an arm-mounted bladed weapon and switches his faction signal back and forth from Autobot to Decepticon.
Soundwave
Voiced by: Robert O. Smith (in most episode), Garry Chalk (in "Giant")
Soundwave makes his entrance later in the search for the Cyber Planet Keys, offering to guide Megatron and the Decepticons to the wormhole that would lead them to Gigantion. Once on the planet, he joins with Sideways and they both attempt to acquire the Omega Lock and Keys for themselves, only to be blasted into another dimension. Unlike his other counterparts, this one sounds like a deadpan 80s' rave club DJ. Soundwave transforms into a stealth jet fighter.
Laserbeak
Soundwave's Mini-Con-like robot that's stored in Soundwave's chest compartment who transforms from a condor into a battery bomb. While the action figure of Soundwave has Laserbeak deployed through Soundwave's Cyber Key, the animated version does not have Laserbeak ejected through the Cyber Key or to use it at all.

==== Other Decepticons ====
Scrapmetals
The Scrapmetals (Rambles) are an army of drone-like, mutant mechanical lifeforms. While they bear the Decepticon symbol, they serve neither Megatron or Starscream and act like swarms of vicious insects. They come from worlds neighboring Cybertron and swarmed to the planet when it was abandoned during the black hole crisis. They were faced down by the Cybertron Defense Team who wiped out a large number of them. However, the Scrapmetal population clearly survived, as shown by the swarm that attacked and nearly killed Crumplezone. Later, a destroyed Scrapmetal was used by Coby to create his own pilotable Transformer, the Cobybot. They all transform into "spider-tank" vehicles and come in varieties of red, blue, and yellow. They too have a Cyber Key and powers which make their cannons unsheathe a sword, but this was never seen in action.

=== Factionless Transformers ===
Primus
Voiced by: Michael Donovan
The benevolent creator of the Transformers, Primus is the true form of the Transformers' true home planet, Cybertron. Each of the Cyber Planet Keys contains a portion of his power; upon the collection of all but the Gigantion key, Cybertron transformed into Primus's robot mode and defeated Starscream in battle using his own moons as weapons. Subsequently, the acquisition of the Giant Planet key reunited Primus's spark with his body and he used his power to seal the black hole and recreate Cybertron as a new, idyllic world. His Cyber Key power unleashes energy from his hands which he used on Starscream but he deflects it.
Unicron
As Primus's brother and ancient foe, Unicron sought to destroy life where Primus sought to protect it. Having been previously battled by the Transformers in Armada and then Energon, Unicron was ultimately defeated when his spark was imprisoned by Primus within an energon sun. The destruction of Unicron - the embodiment of evil - in this manner, however, caused a fundamental imbalance in the universe, which caused the sun to collapse in upon itself, creating the massive black hole that threatened not just Cybertron, but the entire multiverse. Although Unicron does not bear a Decepticon insignia on his body, he is assumed to be on the Decepticon side due to his extreme level of evil and his rivalry with Primus.

=== Humans ===
==== Main humans ====
Coby Hansen
Voiced by: Yukiko Tamaki (Japanese); Samuel Vincent (English)
Coby Hansen is the primary human character in Cybertron. The character has been used in the television series, comic book series, and collection of children's toys manufactured by Takara Tomy in conjunction with Hasbro. In the series, he is a mechanically-inclined 14-year-old who is often called on by the Transformers to do repairs. He lives in Colorado with his younger brother, Bud, and older brother, Tim and enjoys dirtbike racing and has worked at a mechanic's shop. Coby and Bud, along with their friend, Lori (the only female of the series), befriended the Autobots after finding and aiding the damaged Landmine. He develops a friendship with Landmine, and aids Hot Shot on Velocitron. Later in the show, he actually refits a destroyed Scrapmetal as his own personal vehicle called the Cobybot ("Cobyrumble" in Galaxy Force), earning himself an Autobot Commission and an active role in the battles after he used it to save Bud, who was trapped among the Decepticons. He is very protective of his little brother Bud.
Bud Hansen
Voiced by: Ryan Hirakida
Coby's younger brother, Bud is a kid through and through. He likes things that kids like, and he daydreams like kids do, although in Bud's case, his daydreams often become reality thanks to his friendship with the Autobots. Very little can phase Bud - his unrelentingly positive attitude keeps him from worrying too much about anything, even the possibility of his own demise. As the ending credits of the final episode show, he won an Academy Award for the documentary he produced about his adventures.
Lori Jiménez
Voiced by: Sarah Edmondson
Lori Jiménez is the most level-headed of the group, keeping Coby and Bud under some degree of control. As a city girl, she was not pleased when her parents moved from a city to a small town in Colorado, but the adventures she had with the Transformers soon took her mind off that. Along the way, she gains a friendship with Override and forms a connection with Scourge - both referring to her as "little sister". She even developed a rivalry with the female Decepticon Thunderblast. The ending credits show that she and Coby eventually get married.
Colonel Mike Franklin
Voiced by: Michael Dobson
When the young Franklin was saved from a raging river as a child by Evac, Mike Franklin dedicated himself to acquiring information on the Transformers, eventually becoming a colonel for an unnamed branch of the U.S. military. Franklin later becomes an ally of the Autobots themselves. At the end of the series, he developed a romance with Professor Suzuki, who - to his surprise - revealed they were engaged. The ending credits show that they do get married and have a child.
Professor Lucy Suzuki
Voiced by: Tabitha St. Germain
Professor Lucy Suzuki is a scientist who is not exactly held in high standing amongst her scientific colleagues due to her ideas about alien beings and the Hollow Earth theory, but that doesn't bother her. She quickly and easily befriends Coby, Bud and Lori due to their own open-mindedness about her theories, and becomes involved in investigating the Transformers for the government. When Colonel Franklin revealed that his motives were peaceful, she became friendly with him, and eventually decided that they were going to get engaged. The ending credits show that they married and have a child.

==== Minor humans ====
Tim Hansen
Voiced by: Terry Klassen
Coby and Bud's older brother. He has an unnamed girlfriend or fiancé.
Stanton
Voiced by: Terry Klassen
A mechanic who Coby spends a lot of time working with.
Robert Hansen
Voiced by: Mark Oliver
Coby, Bud, and Tim's father is a brown-haired man. He and Coby have been seen racing dirtbikes together.
Mrs. Hansen
The blonde-haired mother of Coby, Bud, and Tim.
Ernesto
Voiced by: Michael Dobson
Lori's father who is a real-estate developer who enjoys amateur astronomy.
Gloria
Voiced by: Lisa Ann Beley
Lori is a somewhat portly woman and her career is unknown. In the English version, she is the mother of Lori's older brother that is conspicuously absent.

Rad, Carlos, Alexis, and Kicker from Armada and Energon briefly appeared in the finale to strengthen Hasbro's connection of Armada, Energon, and Cybertron.

=== Other Transformers ===
In the series, multiple "extra" Transformers have been shown, with most of them serving as the general inhabitants of the various planets.

==== Civilian Autobots ====
Autobots living on Earth while Cybertron is threatened by the black hole. Several of them have proven to be recurring characters.

- 4 ancient ancestor Transformers that are seen in "Balance". They resemble g1 characters.
- Longrack - An Autobot who transforms into an excavator, resembles Hoist from Armada.
- 3 cars resembling Blurr from the toy-line; they come in blue, red, & gold varieties (the toy line identifies them as Backtrack, Spiral and Oval)
- 2 Transformers that transform into submarines; 1 ended up discovering the remains of Atlantis.
- An excavator
- A truck
- A couple Transformers that turn into passenger planes.
- An Autobot that was seen transforming into a truck. Seen in the episode "Hidden".
- An Autobot that transforms into a taxicab. Seen in episode "Search".
- An Autobot that transforms into a phone booth. He is identified as Phreaker on the transformers website.
- An Autobot who turns into either a satellite or a space shuttle. Seen in the episode "Ship".
- An Autobot that transforms into a traffic light. In the last episode of the series, he transforms (his transformation scheme being similar to that of Mudflap), and his name is revealed to be Signal Lancer in the Japanese version. His unusual alternate mode has made him a favorite among fans of the series.
- Two Autobots who, apparently, turn into mailboxes.
- A submarine in the episode "Hidden".

==== Speed Planet Transformers ====
The denizens of Speed Planet. Most appear in the form of cars (most resembling the "Blurr" model), or in robot modes that resemble the usual generic models used in the series. There are, however, some notable exceptions.

- Buzzsaw - He transforms into a yellow and purple helicopter and could be seen flying overhead during several races on Velocitron. He resembles Cyclonus.
- A blue, camera-like 'bot that served as announcer and "eye-in-the-sky" commentator for the big race.

==== Jungle Planet Transformers ====
The denizens of Jungle Planet. They all appear in animal form, and have transformations ranging from modern, mythological, and prehistoric creatures, which means they must have visited Earth at some point. They include several that resemble an Apatosaurus, an owl, a deer, a lobster, a giraffe, and a tropical bird.

==== Ancient Earth Decepticons ====
Descendants of the original Transformers who came to the planet on the starship Atlantis. They inspired legends of monsters and supernatural creatures among the people of Earth. They were all captured and sealed in stasis pods by Crosswise for a number of years, until they were freed by Starscream. They have the ability to project an image around themselves that resemble cryptids (examples being Count Dracula, a werewolf, Bigfoot, and some dragons). They can also transform into large "Seeker ships" by merging with one another. The Ancient Earth Decepticons were all defeated and re-sealed, with the exception of Thunderblast and Lugnutz. However, Evac and Crosswise made a deal with Lugnutz, and released them to help in the final battle against Galvatron. Ultimately, a large number of them joined the space bridge project at the end of the series.

==== Giant Planet Transformers ====
The people of this planet all transform into construction equipment.

- A Transformer who takes the form of a crane. Seen in the episode "Giant".
- A Transformer who takes the form of a large dump truck.

==== Planet X Transformers ====
In the past, Planet X was populated by "mass production" types similar to Sideways and Soundwave, as well as numerous Mini-Cons fashioned in the same model as Laserbeak.

== Cast ==
Character	Japanese (Galaxy Force)	English (Cybertron)
Coby Hansen	Yukiko Tamaki	Sam Vincent
Lori	Rika Morinaga	Sarah Edmondson; Chiara Zanni (Episode 25, 26, 52)
Bud Hansen	Mayumi Kurokawa	Ryan Hirakida
Tim Hansen	Junichi Suwabe; Susumu Chiba (Episode 26)	Terry Klassen
Lucy Suzuki	Machiko Toyoshima	Tabitha St. Germain
Mike Franklin	Rintarou Nishi	Michael Dobson
Galaxy Convoy / Optimus Prime	Taiten Kusunoki	Garry Chalk
Backpack / Scattorshot	Tarusuke Shingaki	Richard Ian Cox
First Aid / Red Alert	Yasuyuki Kase	Brian Dobson
Guard Shell / Landmine	Tomoyuki Shimura	Paul Dobson
Dreadlock / Jetfire	Hideo Ishikawa	Brian Drummond
Vector Prime	Shō Hayami	Richard Newman
Master Megatron / Megatron	Jōji Nakata	David Kaye; Trevor Devall
Thundercracker	Kazunari Tanaka	Mark Oliver
Fang Wolf / Snarl	Yūto Kazama	Scott McNeil
Starscream	Takaya Kuroda	Michael Dobson
Exilion / Hot Shot	Daisuke Hirakawa	Kirby Morrow

== Adaptations ==
A manga adaptation of the series, written and illustrated by Yoshihiro Iwamoto (岩本 佳浩, Iwamoto Yoshihiro), was serialized from the February to October 2005 issues of Kodansha's Comic BomBom magazine. A tankōbon was released on August 5, 2005. Although it has the same idea of searching for Chip Squares and Planet Forces to extinguish the Grand Black Hole as in the anime, the storyline development and characterizations are unique. Due to the manga's cancellation, the final three chapters were never collected into a tankōbon.

== Reception ==
Tim Janson, a reviewer for Mania.com, wrote a positive review:

"Transformers Cybertron showed that both Takara and Hasbro were committed to co-producing a quality show which had a depth of plot and characterization better than any other Transformers show since Beast Wars. Oh, it's not perfect. The repeated use of the same transforming sequences, especially Optimus Prime's, gets old after about a half dozen episodes, and you realize you still have 46 to go! Also, there are no extras of any kind in the seven-disc set. No commentaries, no deleted scenes, nothing. Hasbro and Takara HAVE to do more to appeal to collectors and adult fans. All in all, the best Transformers show since Beast Wars."

Michael Drucker at IGN, reviewed the Transformers Cybertron: A New Beginning DVD, criticizing it as "A lackluster update on classic characters with minimal plot". The video quality was criticized for compression artifacts. The DVD was also criticized for its lack of extra features. Overall, the DVD was given a "bad" rating of 3 out of 10.
