= Yoshino Takamori =

Japanese voice actress

- 鷹森 淑乃
- Born: November 23, 1963 (age 62); Ichikawa, Chiba Prefecture, Japan
- Occupation: Voice actress
- Years active: 1984–present
- Agent: Arts Vision
- Height: 152 cm (5 ft 0 in)
- Children: Akiha Matsui

Yoshino Takamori (鷹森 淑乃, Takamori Yoshino; born November 23, 1963) is a Japanese voice actress from Chiba Prefecture, Japan.

== Biography ==
Takamori was born in Ichikawa, Chiba Prefecture. She has younger sister. Her father is a dentist and professor of dentistry. She started learning the piano at the age of 3. She went to high school attached to the Tokyo College of Music, and entered the piano department of the Tokyo College of Music. Although she applied for the Nippon Broadcasting System-sponsored amateur voice actor contest while in college and was defeated, she entered Hisashi Katsuta's voice acting school (now voice actor Katsuta Gakuin) in 1983, her sophomore year at university. In the second graduation in the same period, Ayako Shiraishi, Miki Itō, Maya Okamoto and Omi Minami were among the older people of the first generation. In the fall of 1984, while still enrolled in college and the voice acting class, she made her voice acting debut as Patty Pumpkin, the heroine of Super Power Robot Garat. After debuting, she joined Arts Vision from the voice actor classroom.

In 1985, she voiced the main character Judy in Alpen Rose, after which she continued to lend her voice to many child roles. In 1987 she voiced Sawako Matsumoto, the main character of Introduction to Manga Nihon Keizai, her first adult role at the age of 24. She voiced Anice Farm in Sonic Soldier Borgman in 1988 and Nadia in Nadia of the Mysterious Seas in 1990.

Takamori is married to a dentist. Her daughter Akiha Matsui is also a voice actress.

== Voice roles ==
- Amon Saga (Princess Lichia)
- Attack on Titan (Carla Yeager) - 2013
- Attack on Titan Season 3 (Carla Jaeger) - 2018
- Aura Battler Dunbine (Lemul Zilfied)
- Barakamon (Emi Handa)
- Battle Royal High School (Junko)
- Bikkuriman (Hera)
- Bubblegum Crisis (Sylvie)
- Canvas 2: Niji Iro no Sketch (Yu Shinomiya)
- Case Closed (Akane Katori, Mayuko Kichise, Yuriko Minegishi)
- Choriki Robo Galatt (Patty Pumpkin)
- City Hunter (Reika Nogami)
- Cleopatra DC (Marianne)
- Crayon Shin-chan (Himemiya)
- Cyborg Kuro-chan (Osamu)
- Darker than Black (Annie)
- Dragon Ball: Goku's Fire Brigade (Fire Safety Kids Boy)
- Dragon Century (Riko)
- Firestorm (Nagisa Kisaragi)
- Fist of the North Star 2 (Rui)
- Fullmetal Alchemist (Trisha Elric, Juliet Douglas/Sloth)
- Fullmetal Alchemist: Brotherhood (Trisha Elric)
- Genesis of Aquarion (Tatania)
- Honō no Alpen Rose: Judy & Randy (Judy)
- Idol Densetsu Eriko (Yasuko Nakata)
- Jinki:Extend (Minami Kosaka)
- Kyo Kara Maoh! (Lady Flynn Gilbit)
- Maburaho (Shino Akai)
- Melody of Oblivion (Discount Uribo)
- Nadia of the Mysterious Seas (Nadia)
- Paradise Kiss (Yukino Koizumi)
- Please Save My Earth (Enju)
- Project A-Ko (Ine)
- RIN ~Daughters of Mnemosyne~ (Yuki Maeno)
- Rail of the Star (Chitose Kobayashi)
- Sailor Moon S (Maya Tohno, Viluy)
- Sakura Wars series (Hanabi Kitaoji)
- Sket Dance (Ai Mataomi)
- Someday's Dreamers: Summer Skies (Seiko Suzuki)
- Sonic Soldier Borgman (Anice Farm)
- Tamagotchi: The Movie (Mamamametchi)
- Touch (Kusaka)
- What's Michael? (Mrs. Kobayashi)
- Yawara! (Sayaka Honami)

=== Dubbing ===
- The Funhouse (Amy Harper (Elizabeth Berridge))
- Licence to Kill (Della Churchill (Priscilla Barnes))
- Police Academy 4: Citizens on Patrol (Laura (Corinne Bohrer))
- Safe House (Julie Delaney (Lynsey McLaren))
