= Robert O. Smith =

American actor (1942–2010)

- Born: November 27, 1942
- Died: May 30, 2010 (aged 67); British Columbia, Canada
- Occupation: Voice actor
- Years active: 1972–2010

Robert O. Smith (November 27, 1942 – May 30, 2010) was an American voice actor.

== Filmography ==
=== Animation ===
- Animated Classic Showcase – additional characters
- Billy the Cat – Manx, Sanctifur
- G.I. Joe: A Real American Hero (DiC) – Grunt, Wet-Suit
- The Fearless Four – Taxidermy Representative / DR. Sevenbrains
- Madeline – additional characters
- Pocket Dragon Adventures – Sparkles
- The Story of Christmas

=== Video games ===
- Hulk – soldiers and guards
- The Movies – DJ Mad Dog (radio host)

=== Anime dubbing ===
- Dragon Ball: Curse of the Blood Rubies – Major Domo (Ocean dub)
- Dragon Ball Z – Moori (Ocean Dub), Guru (Ocean Dub)
- Fatal Fury: Legend of the Hungry Wolf – Raiden
- Fatal Fury: The Motion Picture – Cheng Sinzan, Big Bear
- Inuyasha – Kaijinbō
- Maison Ikkoku – Kyoko's father, Mr. Ichinose
- The New Adventures of Kimba The White Lion – Teekay
- Ranma ½ – Genma Saotome, Sasuke Sarugakure, Additional voices
- MegaMan NT Warrior Axess – GravityMan
- The Ultimate Teacher – Karima Hurei
- Transformers: Cybertron – Soundwave

== Death ==
Smith died on May 30, 2010, due to pancreatic and liver cancer in British Columbia, Canada. He was 67.
