= Miki Itō =

Japanese voice actress and narrator (born 1962)

- 伊藤 美紀
- Born: Miki Itō; October 21, 1962 (age 63); Tokyo, Japan
- Education: University of Tsukuba
- Occupations: Voice actress; narrator
- Years active: 1985–present
- Agent: Office Osawa
- Notable work: Dragon Ball Z as Android 18; Fate/stay night as Taiga Fujimura; Cardcaptor Sakura as Sonomi Daidouji; Higurashi: When They Cry as Miyo Takano; Umineko When They Cry as Eva Ushiromiya
- Height: 152 cm (5 ft 0 in)

Miki Itō (伊藤 美紀, Itō Miki; , born October 21, 1962) is a Japanese voice actress and narrator who is affiliated with the Office Osawa (大沢事務所) agency.

== Biography ==
She graduated from the University of Tsukuba. She began attending the Katsuta Voice Actor's Academy in her third year, and in January 1985 she debuted as a voice actress in OVA Greed. She first starred in a child's project in 1986. In the early 1990s, she transferred to the Office Osawa talent agency in order to work as a narrator.

== Filmography ==
=== Anime series ===
1985

- Mobile Suit Zeta Gundam (Mineva Lao Zabi)

1986

- Bosco Adventure (Jenny)
- Mobile Suit Gundam ZZ (Mineva Lao Zabi)
- Project A-ko (A-ko)

1987

- Bubblegum Crisis (Irene)

1988

- City Hunter 2 (Machiko Gamō)

1989

- Aoi Blink (Princess Kirara)
- Chimpui (Sayaka Hata)
- Jungle Book Shōnen Mowgli (Kichi)

1992

- Dragon Ball Z (Android 18)
- Pretty Soldier Sailor Moon (Thetis, Princess Dia, U Bara, Arisu Itsuki)
- Tokyo Babylon (Hokuto Sumeragi)

1993

- Ghost Sweeper Mikami (Aiko)
- Gunnm (Gally)
- Mobile Suit Victory Gundam (Lup Cineau)

1994

- Brave Police J-Decker (Eva Fahrzeug)
- Magic Knight Rayearth (Nova)
- Mahōjin Guru Guru (Churu)

1996

- Dragon Ball GT (Android 18)

1997

- Battle Athletes Victory (Jessie Gartland)

1998

- Cardcaptor Sakura (Sonomi Daidouji)
- Detective Conan (Eri Akechi (Eps. 379-380); Hatsuho Hōjō (Eps. 261-262); Miho Nishitani (Ep. 70))
- Twinbee Paradise (Mint-Herb & Gwinbee)
- Weiß Kreuz (Schoen)

1999

- Angels of the Stars: Angel Links (Anne)

2000

- Boogiepop Phantom (Makiko Kisugi)

2002

- Saishu Heiki Kanojo (Fuyumi)

2003

- Ashita no Nadja (Savellli, Julietta)
- Kimi ga Nozomu Eien (Azusa Ishida)

2004

- Aishiteruze Baby (Miki Sakashita)
- Maria-sama ga Miteru (Sachiko Ogasawara)
- Maria-sama ga Miteru: Printemps (Sachiko Ogasawara)

2005

- Ah! My Goddess (Lind)
- Hell Girl (Keiko Yasuda)
- Kamichu! (Akane Hitotsubashi)
- Shuffle! (Asa Shigure)

2006

- Air Gear (Ryo Mimasaka)
- Higurashi When They Cry (Miyo Takano)
- Fate/stay night (Taiga Fujimura)
- Ghost Hunt (Keiko Ubusuna)
- Kenichi: The Mightiest Disciple (Kisara's mother)
- Maria-sama ga Miteru (Sachiko Ogasawara)

2007

- Baccano! (Natalie Beriam)
- Gin Tama (Kujaku Hime Kada)
- Higurashi When They Cry: Kai (Miyo Takano)
- Myself ; Yourself (Aoi Oribe's mother)

2008

- Glass Maiden (Monica)
- Natsume's Book of Friends (Touko Fujiwara)
- Tales of the Abyss (Legretta the Quick)

2009

- Maria-sama ga Miteru (Sachiko Ogasawara)
- Umineko no Naku Koro ni (Eva Ushiromiya)

2010

- The World God Only Knows (Okada)
- Stitch! ~Best Friends Forever~ (Carmen)

2011

- Freezing (Olivia el Bridget)
- Gosick (Kazuya's mother)
- Persona 4: The Animation (Eri Minami)

2012

- From the New World (Mizuho Watanabe)

2013

- Fate/kaleid liner Prisma Illya (Taiga Fujimura)
- Magi: The Kingdom of Magic (Ren Gyokuen)

2014

- Fate/stay night: Unlimited Blade Works (2014) (Taiga Fujimura)
- Glasslip (Suzune Nagamiya)
- Noragami (Mrs. Iki)

2015

- Dragon Ball Super (Android 18)
- Noragami Aragoto (Mrs. Iki)

2016

- Fukigen na Mononokean (Nara Ashiya)

2017

- Hozuki's Coolheadedness (Jigoku Dayu)

2018

- Cardcaptor Sakura: Clear Card (Sonomi Daidouji)
- Xuan Yuan Sword Luminary (Lady Pong)

2019

- Star Twinkle PreCure (AI)

2020

- Higurashi: When They Cry – Gou (Miyo Takano)

2021

- Higurashi: When They Cry – Sotsu (Miyo Takano)

2022

- Uzaki-chan Wants to Hang Out! ω (Haruko Sakurai)

2023

- The Tale of the Outcasts (Kate)

2025

- The Too-Perfect Saint: Tossed Aside by My Fiancé and Sold to Another Kingdom (Hildegarde Adenauer)
- Turkey! Time to Strike (Anzu)

Unknown year

- The Garden of Sinners: Paradox Spiral (Kaede Enjō)
- Hamatora (Naoko Itō)
- Kino's Journey (Sakura's mother)
- Odin Sphere (Milis)
- Project A-ko (A-ko Magami)
- Saikin, Imōto no Yōsu ga Chotto Okaishiin Da Ga. (Kyoko Kōzaki)
- Sekirei (Takami Sahashi)
- Shiki (Nao Yasumori)
- Time of Eve (Rina)
- Touka Gettan (Juna & Yumiko Kamiazuma)

=== Original video animation ===
- Sol Bianca (1990) (May Jessica)
- The Hakkenden (1990) (Princess Fuse Satomi)
- Burn Up! (1991) (Reimi)
- Battle Angel (1993) (Gally)
- Butt Attack Punisher Girl Gotaman (1994) (Saori Minami)
- Princess Minerva (1995) (Princess Minerva)
- Battle Athletes (1997) (Jessie Gurtland)
- Higurashi When They Cry: Rei (2009) (Miyo Takano)

=== Anime films ===
- Project A-ko (1986) (A-ko)
- City Hunter: Bay City Wars (1990) (Miki)
- City Hunter: Million Dollar Conspiracy (1990) (Miki)
- Doraemon: Nobita and the Kingdom of Clouds (1992) (Paruparu)
- Dragon Ball Z: Bio-Broly (1994) (Android 18)
- Doraemon: Nobita's Genesis Diary (1995) (Girl)
- Hermes – Winds of Love (1997) (Aphrodite)
- Doraemon: Nobita Drifts in the Universe (1999) (Rian's Mother)
- Crayon Shin-chan: The Storm Called The Jungle (2000) (TV Narrator)
- The Garden of Sinners: Paradox Spiral (2008) (Kaede Enjou)
- Fate/stay night: Unlimited Blade Works (2010) (Taiga Fujimura)
- Doraemon: Nobita and the Island of Miracles (2012) (Nobita's Grandmother)
- Dragon Ball Z: Battle of Gods (2013) (Android 18)
- Dragon Ball Z: Resurrection 'F' (2015) (Android 18)
- Fate/stay night: Heaven's Feel I. presage flower (2017) (Taiga Fujimura)
- Natsume's Book of Friends Movie (2018) (Touko Fujiwara)
- Fate/stay night: Heaven's Feel II. lost butterfly (2019) (Taiga Fujimura)
- Dragon Ball Super: Super Hero (2022) (Android 18)

=== Video games ===
- Sol Bianca (1990) (May Jessica)
- Dragon Ball Z: Super Butōden (1993) (Android 18)
- Dragon Ball Z: Ultimate Battle 22 (1995) (Android 18)
- Battle Athletes (1996) (Jessie Gurtland)
- Gunnm: Martian Memory (1998) (Gally)
- Dragon Ball Z: Budokai (2002) (Android 18)
- Dragon Ball Z: Budokai 2 (2003) (Android 18)
- Dragon Ball Z: Budokai 3 (2004) (Android 18)
- Dragon Ball Z: Budokai Tenkaichi (2005) (Android 18)
- Super Dragon Ball Z (2005) (Android 18)
- Dragon Ball Z: Shin Budokai (2006) (Android 18)
- Dragon Ball Z: Budokai Tenkaichi 2 (2006) (Android 18)
- Fate/stay night Réalta Nua (2007) (Taiga Fujimura)
- Dragon Ball Z: Shin Budokai - Another Road (2007) (Android 18)
- Dragon Ball Z: Budokai Tenkaichi 3 (2007) (Android 18)
- Dragon Ball Z: Burst Limit (2008) (Android 18)
- GetAmped2 (2008) (Linda Bobo)
- Dragon Ball Z: Infinite World (2008) (Android 18)
- Dragon Ball: Raging Blast (2009) (Android 18)
- Dragon Ball Z: Tenkaichi Tag Team (2010) (Android 18)
- Dragon Ball: Raging Blast 2 (2010) (Android 18)
- Dragon Ball Z: Ultimate Tenkaichi (2011) (Android 18)
- PlayStation All-Stars Battle Royale (2012) (Fat Princess)
- Dragon Ball Z: Battle of Z (2014) (Android 18)
- Muramasa: The Demon Blade (2014) (Cho Cho Dayu)
- Granblue Fantasy (2014) (Cordelia)
- Dragon Ball Xenoverse (2015) (Android 18)
- Dragon Ball Xenoverse 2 (2016) (Android 18)
- Fate/Grand Order (2016) (Jaguar Warrior)
- Dragon Ball FighterZ (2018) (Android 18)
- That Time I Got Reincarnated as a Slime: ISEKAI Memories (Cliché)

=== Dubbing ===
==== Live-action ====
- Bring It On (Courtney (Clare Kramer))
- Committed (Joline (Heather Graham))
- The Cotton Club (Vera Cicero (Diane Lane))
- Emmanuelle (1996 TV Tokyo edition) (Marie-Ange (Christine Boisson))
- Fuller House (Kimmy Gibbler (Andrea Barber))
- Helix (Dr. Julia Walker (Kyra Zagorsky))
- High Fidelity (Laura (Iben Hjejle))
- Kate & Leopold (Darci (Natasha Lyonne))
- The Mask (Tina Carlyle (Cameron Diaz))
- MotherFatherSon (Kathryn Villiers (Helen McCrory))
- Mrs. Doubtfire (Lydia "Lydie" Hillard (Lisa Jakub))
- Pulp Fiction (Fabienne (Maria de Medeiros))
- There's Something About Mary (Mary Jensen (Cameron Diaz))
- Under Siege (Jordan Tate/Ms. July (Erika Eleniak))
- The War (Lidia Simmons (Lexi Randall))

==== Animation ====
- A Christmas Carol (Belle)
- Finding Dory (Cindy)
- Go Jetters (Kyan)

== Discography ==
- Higurashi When They Cry Character Case Book 2 (January 16, 2008) – Sang "Bon" and in the drama as Miyo Takano
- Higurashi When They Cry Character Case Book 3 (February 14, 2008) – In the drama as Miyo Takano
