= List of adventure anime =

This is a list of adventure anime television series, films, and OVAs.

Year(s)	English title	Japanese title	Type	Director	Studio	Ref
1970–1971	The Adventures of Hutch the Honeybee		TV series	Ippei Kuri	Tatsunoko Productions	
1975–1976	The Adventures of Pepero		TV series	Kazuhiko Udagawa	Wako Pro	
1976	3000 Leagues in Search of Mother		TV series	Isao Takahata	Nippon Animation	
1978–1979	The Adventures of the Little Prince		TV series			
1980	3000 Leagues in Search of Mother		Film	Isao Takahata, Hajime Okayasu	Nippon Animation	
1982	Acrobunch		TV series	Masakazu Yasumura	Kokusai Eigasha, TMS Entertainment	
1984–1985	Adventures of the Little Koala		TV series		Topcraft	
1987	The Adventures of Scamper the Penguin		Film	Kinjiro Yoshida, Gennady Sokolskiy		
1989	The Adventures of Peter Pan		TV series	Takashi Nakamura, Yoshio Kuroda	Nippon Animation	
1994–1996	801 T.T.S. Airbats		OVA Series	Yuji Moriyama	Studio Fantasia	
1997	Agent Aika		OVA Series	Katsuhiko Nishijima	Studio Fantasia	
1998	Sorcerous Stabber Orphen: Beginning		TV series	Hiroshi Watanabe	J.C. Staff	
1999	Sorcerous Stabber Orphen: Revenge		TV series	Toru Takahashi	J.C. Staff	
1999	Marco: 3000 Leagues in Search of Mother		Film	Kozo Kuzuha	Nippon Animation	
1999	One Piece (1999 TV series)		Tv Series	Eiichiro Oda	Toei Animation	
2000–2004	Inuyasha		TV series	Yasunao Aoki	Sunrise	
2004	10 Tokyo Warriors		OVA Series	Hikaru Takanashi	Zexcs	
2004–2005	Tweeny Witches		TV series	Yoshiharu Ashino	Studio 4°C	
2007	Aika R-16: Virgin Mission		OVA Series	Katsuhiko Nishijima	Studio Fantasia	
2020	Goblin Slayer	ゴブリンスレイヤー, Hepburn: Goburin Sureiyā	Series	Square Enix	JA/EN	
2007	Gurren Lagann	Tengen Toppa Gurren Lagann	TV series	Hiroyuki Imaishi	Gainax	
2007	Tweeny Witches: The Adventure		OVA Series	Yoshiharu Ashino	Studio 4°C	
2012	009 RE:CYBORG		Film	Kenji Kamiyama	Production I.G, Sanzigen	
2014–present	The Seven Deadly Sins		TV series	Tensai Okamura	A-1 Pictures	
2020	Sorcerous Stabber Orphen: Wayward Journey		TV series	Takayuki Hamana	Studio Deen	
2023-present	Elemon		TV series	N/A	Toei Animation	
