= List of science fiction anime =

This is a list of science fiction anime television series, films, OVAs and ONAs.

Year(s)	Title	Type	Director	Studio	Ref
1963–1966	Astro Boy	TV series	Osamu Tezuka	Mushi Productions	
1963–1964	8 Man	TV series	Haruyuki Kawajima	Eiken, TCJ Animation Center	
1964–1965	Big X	TV series	Mitsutero Okamoto, Osamu Dezaki	TMS Entertainment	
1965–1966	The Amazing 3	TV series	Taku Sugiyama	Mushi Productions	
1965–1966	Prince Planet	TV series	Sato Ōkura	TCJ (now Eiken)	
1972	Science Ninja Team Gatchaman	TV series	Hisayuki Toriumi	Tatsunoko Productions	
1976-1977	Kyoryu Tankentai Born Free	TV series	Jun Oki, Kiyoshi Suzuki, Koichi Takano	Sunrise	
1978	Gatchaman II	TV series	Hiroshi Sasagawa	Tatsunoko Productions	
1978-1979	Captain Future	TV series	Tomoharu Katsumata	Toei Animation	
1980	Be Forever Yamato	Film	Leiji Matsumoto, Toshio Masuda	Group TAC	
1980	Mū no Hakugei	TV series	Tetsuo Imazawa	TMS Entertainment	
1980–1981	Astro Boy	TV series	Noburo Ishiguro	Tezuka Production	
1981–1986	Urusei Yatsura	TV series	Mamoru Oshii, Kazuo Yamazaki	Pierrot, Studio Deen	
1982	Andromeda Stories	TV film	Masamitsu Sasaki	Toei Animation	
1982	Arcadia of My Youth	Film	Tomoharu Katsumata		
1982–1983	Arcadia of My Youth: Endless Orbit SSX	TV series	Tomoharu Katsumata	Toei Animation	
1984	Bagi, the Monster of Mighty Nature	TV film	Osamu Tezuka	Tezuka Productions	
1984	Birth	OVA film	Shinya Sadamitsu	Idol, Kaname Production	
1986	Ai City	Film	Kōichi Mashimo	Toho, Movic, Ashi Productions	
1986	Roots Search	OVA film	Hisashi Sugai	Studio Live, Nippon Columbia	
1987	2001 Nights	OVA film	Yoshio Takeuchi	TMS Entertainment	
1987	Digital Devil Story: Megami Tensei	OVA film	Mizuho Nishikubo		
1988	Akira	Film	Katsuhiro Otomo	Tokyo Movie Shinsha	
1988	Appleseed	OVA film	Kazuyoshi Katayama	Gainax	
1988	Starship Troopers (OVA)	OVA series	Tetsurō Amino	Sunrise	
1989	Baoh	OVA film	Hiroyuki Yokoyama	Studio Pierrot	
1989	The Enemy's the Pirates!	OVA series		Madhouse, I.G Tatsunoko, Watanabe Promotion	
1989	Patlabor: The Movie	Film	Mamoru Oshii	Studio DeenProduction I.G	
1989–1990	Gosenzo-sama Banbanzai!	OVA series	Mamoru Oshii	Pierrot	
1989– 1990	Patlabor: The TV Series	TV Series	Naoyuki Yoshinaga	Sunrise	
1990	Maroko	Film	Mamoru Oshii	Pierrot	
1990-1992	Patlabor: The New Files	OVA Series	Naoyuki Yoshinaga	Sunrise	
1991	Armored Police Metal Jack	TV series	Hiroshi Matsuzono	Sunrise	
1991	Future GPX Cyber Formula	TV series	Mitsuo Fukuda	Sunrise	
1992–1994	Ai no Kusabi	OVA series	Akira Nishimori, Katsuhito Akiyama	AIC	
1993	8 Man After	OVA series		J.C.Staff	
1993	Big Wars	Film	Issei Kume, Toshifumi Takizawa	Magic Bus	
1993	Patlabor 2: The Movie	Film	Mamoru Oshii	Production I.G	
1995	Bio Hunter	OVA film	Yuzo Sato	Madhouse	
1996	Apocalypse Zero	OVA series	Toshihiro Hirano	Ashi Productions	
1996	B't X	TV series	Mamoru Hamatsu	TMS Entertainment	
1996	Birdy the Mighty	OVA series	Yoshiaki Kawajiri	Madhouse	
1998	Outlaw Star	TV series	Mitsuru Hongo	Sunrise	
1997	Agent Aika	OVA series	Katsuhiko Nishijima	Studio Fantasia	
1997	B't X Neo	TV series	Mamoru Hamatsu	TMS Entertainment	
1997–1998	Battle Athletes	OVA series	Kazuhiro Ozawa	AIC	
1997–1998	Battle Athletes Victory	TV series	Katsuhito Akiyama	AIC	
1998	All Purpose Cultural Cat-Girl Nuku Nuku DASH!	OVA series	Yoshitaka Fujimoto	MOVIC, Starchild Records	
1998	Cowboy Bebop	TV series	Shinichirō Watanabe	Sunrise	
1998	Yokohama Kaidashi Kikou	OVA series	Takashi Anno	Ajia-do Animation Works	
1999–2000	Amazing Nurse Nanako	OVA series	Hiroshi Negishi	Radix, Genco	
1999–2000	Infinite Ryvius	TV series	Gorō Taniguchi	Sunrise	
1999	Seihō Tenshi Angel Links	TV series	Yūji Yamaguchi	Sunrise, Bandai Visual	
1999	Arc the Lad	TV series	Itsuro Kawasaki	Bee Train	
2000	A.LI.CE	Film	Kenichi Maejima		
2000	Banner of the Stars	TV series	Yasuchika Nagaoka	Sunrise	
2001–2002	Alien Nine	OVA series	Jiro Fujimoto, Yasuhiro Irie	J.C.Staff	
2001	Angelic Layer	TV series	Hiroshi Nishikiori	Bones	
2001	Banner of the Stars II	TV series	Yasuchika Nagaoka	Sunrise	
2002	6 Angels	Film	Makoto Kobayashi		
2002	WXIII: Patlabor the Movie 3	Film	Fumihiko Takayama. Takuji Endo	Madhouse	
2003–2004	Astro Boy	TV series	Kazuya Konaka	Tezuka Productions, Sony Pictures Television	
2003	Avenger	TV series	Koichi Mashimo	Bee Train, Xebec	
2003	Narue no Sekai	TV series	Hiromitsu Morita	Studio Live	
2004	Azusa, Otetsudai Shimasu!	TV film	Hajime Kamegaki	TMS	
2004	Mars Daybreak	TV series	Kunihiro Mori	Bones	
2005	Absolute Boy	TV series	Tomomi Mochizuki	Ajia-do Animation Works, Bandai Visual	
2005	Aria the Animation	TV series	Jun'ichi Satō	Hal Film Maker	
2001	Banner of the Stars III	OVA series	Yasuchika Nagaoka	Sunrise	
2006	009-1	TV series	Naoyuki Konno	Ishimori Entertainment	
2006	Aria the Natural	TV series	Jun'ichi Satō	Hal Film Maker	
2007	Aika R-16: Virgin Mission	OVA series	Katsuhiko Nishijima	Studio Fantasia	
2007	Aria the OVA: Arietta	OVA film	Jun'ichi Satō	Hal Film Maker	
2008	Amuri in Star Ocean	OVA series	Yoshitomo Yonetani	Studio Hibari CG Team	
2008	Aria the Origination	TV series	Jun'ichi Satō	Hal Film Maker	
2008	Tetsuwan Birdy: Decode	TV series	Kazuki Akane	A-1 Pictures	
2008	Blassreiter	TV series	Ichiro Itano	Gonzo	
2009	TO	OVA series	Fumihiko Sori	Avex	
2009	Basquash!	TV series	Shin Itagaki, Eiichi Sato	Satelight	
2009	Tetsuwan Birdy: Decode Season 2	TV series	Kazuki Akane	A-1 Pictures	
2010	Cat Planet Cuties	TV series	Youichi Ueda	AIC PLUS+	
2011–2012	Appleseed XIII	ONA series	Takayuki Hamana	Production I.G	
2011	Appleseed XIII: Tartaros	Film	Takayuki Hamana	Production I.G	
2011	Appleseed XIII: Ouranos	Film	Takayuki Hamana	Production I.G	
2011	Steins;Gate	Visual novel/TV series	Hiroshi Hamasaki; Takuya Sato	White Fox	
2012	009 RE:CYBORG	Film	Kenji Kamiyama	Production I.G, Sanzigen	
2012	AKB0048	TV series	Shōji Kawamori, Yoshimasa Hiraike	Satelight	
2012	Ai no Kusabi 2012	OVA series	Katsuhito Akiyama	AIC	
2012	AKB0048 next stage	TV series	Shōji Kawamori, Yoshimasa Hiraike	Satelight	
2012	From the New World	TV series	Masashi Ishihama	A-1 Pictures	
2013	Arpeggio of Blue Steel	TV series	Seiji Kishi	Sanzigen	
2013	Aruvu Rezuru: Kikaijikake no Yōseitachi	Film	Tatsuya Yoshihara	Zexcs	
2013	Coppelion	TV series	Shingo Suzuki	GoHands	
2013	Double Circle	ONA series			
2013	Gatchaman Crowds	TV series	Kenji Nakamura	Tatsunoko Production	
2013	Valvrave the Liberator	TV series	Kō Matsuo	Sunrise	
2014	Aldnoah.Zero	TV series	Ei Aoki	A-1 Pictures, TROYCA	
2014	Black Bullet	TV series	Masayuki Kojima	Kinema Citrus, Orange	
2014	Brynhildr in the Darkness	TV series	Kenichi Imaizumi	Arms	
2014	Buddy Complex	TV series	Yasuhiro Tanabe	Sunrise	
2014	Captain Earth	TV series	Takuya Igarashi	Bones	
2014	DRAMAtical Murder	TV series	Kazuya Miura	NAZ	
2014	Expelled from Paradise	Film	Seiji Mizushima	Toei Animation	
2014	Hamatora: The Animation	TV series	Seiji Kishi, Hiroshi Kimura	NAZ	
2014	HappinessCharge PreCure!	TV series	Tatsuya Nagamine	Toei Animation	
2014	Knights of Sidonia	TV series	Kōbun Shizuno	Polygon Pictures	
2014	M3 the dark metal	TV series	Junichi Sato	Satelight, C2C	
2014	Mekakucity Actors	TV series	Yūki Yase, Akiyuki Shinbo	Shaft	
2014	Nobunaga the Fool	TV series	Eiichi Sato	Satelight	
2014	Nobunagun	TV series	Nobuhiro Kondo	Bridge	
2014	Persona 4: The Golden Animation	TV series	Seiji Kishi, Tomohisa Taguchi	A-1 Pictures	
2014	Selector Infected WIXOSS	TV series	Takuya Satō	J.C.Staff	
2014	Space Dandy	TV series	Shingo Natsume, Shinichirō Watanabe	Bones	
1978-1979	Space Pirate Captain Harlock	TV series	Rintaro	Toei Animation	
2002	Space Pirate Captain Herlock: The Endless Odyssey	OAV		Madhouse	
2014	Sword Art Online II	TV series	Tomohiko Ito	A-1 Pictures	
2014	Tokyo ESP	TV series	Shigehito Takayanagi	Xebec	
2014	Wooser's Hand-to-Mouth Life: Awakening Arc	TV series	Toyonori Yamada	Sanzigen	
2014	Z/X Ignition	TV series	Yūji Yamaguchi	Telecom Animation Film	
2015	Gatchaman Crowds insight	TV series	Kenji Nakamura	Tatsunoko Production	
2019	Star Twinkle PreCure	TV series	Hiroaki Miyamoto	Toei Animation	
