= Megami Paradise =

1994 video game

- 1995 Laserdisc cover

女神(めがみ)天国(パラダイス) (Megami Paradaisu)
- Genre: Magical girl
- Original video animation
- Directed by: Katsuhiko Nishijima
- Produced by: Kōji Asano; Kazuhiko Ikeguchi
- Written by: Mayori Sekijima
- Music by: Toshiro Yabuki (1); Tsutomu Ōhira (1); Junichi Kanesaki (2)
- Studio: Studio Fantasia
- Licensed by: NA: ADV Films
- Released: June 7, 1995 – August 4, 1995
- Episodes: 2

Megami Paradise (女神(めがみ)天国(パラダイス), Megami Paradaisu) is a role-playing game by NEC Home Electronics and released in 1994 on the PC Engine Super CD-Rom. A two-part OAV series was produced in 1995 by King Records, under their subdivision Starchild Records, and Studio Fantasia. It was directed by Katsuhiko Nishijima and follows in the tradition of his later works Agent Aika and Najica by having character designs by Noriyasu Yamauchi and having copious amount of upskirt shots. The anime is based on a manga with character designs by Akihiro Yoshizane which was serialized in Dengeki PC Engine magazine.

== Availability ==
Megami Paradise was licensed and released in the US by ADV Films in 1996 on two VHS tapes, each containing a single episode with English subtitles.

== Plot ==
The story is set in a utopia-like world made up of only women, under the benevolent rule of a woman called the Mamamega. The Mamamega possesses a magic item called the Astro Star, which absorbs evil from the world outside the paradise they live in. Eventually, when the Astro Star becomes saturated with evil thoughts and desires, the Mamamega has to perform a ceremony to purify the Astro Star, and then she hands over the position of Mamamega to her successor.

As the story begins, the soon-to-be Mamamega chooses Lilith as her first miko (shrine maiden) and tasks Lilith with finding two other mikos, who will serve as guards/attendants to the new Mamamega. But as Lilith goes to try and recruit two others to help her, they cross paths with a group that has other plans for the Astro Star and wants to take over the Paradise they live in.

== Characters ==
- New Mamamega (Voiced by: Atsuko Tanaka): The new Mamamega, who rules over the Megami Paradise and is entrusted with the Astro Star.
- Lilith (Voiced by: Yuri Shiratori): The first woman the new Mamamega recruits to be one of her mikos (shrine maidens). Lilith was surprised to be chosen, since she is not that confident in her own abilities, but the new Mamamega tells her she believes in her potential. She can use her magic to summon spirits. She also a Chosen One.
- Rurubell (Voiced by: Hekiru Shiina): An energetic pink-haired girl who insists that Lilith should include her on the new Mamamega's miko team, although she is young. She can use magic, and has a wide variety of magic tools. She is friends with and looks up to Stashia.
- Stashia (Voiced by: Kikuko Inoue): One of the women Lilith recruits to join her serving the new Mamamega, she is a graceful person who uses a harp/bow as a weapon. However, Stashia is a peaceful woman, and mainly joined as a shrine maiden to look after Rurubell.
- Juliana (Voiced by: Megumi Ogata): A master swordswoman, who Lilith also recruits to be a miko serving the new Mamamega.
- Yamimama (Voiced by: Masako Katsuki): An evil woman whose goal is removing the Astro Star from the Paradise and taking over the world.
- Pastel (Voiced by: Kyoko Hikami): A servant of the Yamimama who fights against Lilith and her friends. She looks like an ordinary little girl but can use powerful dark magic from her wand.
- Rouge (Voiced by: Kumiko Watanabe): A servant of the Yamimama who fights against Lilith and her friends. She wields a sword and can shoot flaming projectiles.
- Maharaja (Voiced by: Yuko Kobayashi): A servant of the Yamimama who fights against Lilith and her friends. She is adept with the whip.
- Angela (Voiced by: Yuko Nagashima): An elf-eared servant of the Yamimama who fights against Lilith and her friends. She wields a large hammer and can summon evil spirit beasts.

== Sequel ==
Megami Paradise II (女神天国II, Megami Paradaisu II) is a strategy simulation video game developed by HuneX Co., Ltd. and published by NEC Home Electronics, Ltd. for the PC-FX. It was released in Japan on July 26, 1996.
