= Masako Katsuki =

Japanese voice actress (born 1958)

- 勝生 真沙子
- Born: Masako Shiono; October 15, 1958 (age 68); Hachinohe, Aomori, Japan
- Occupations: Actress; voice actress; narrator
- Agent: 81 Produce
- Notable work: Sailor Moon as Sailor Neptune; Trapp Family Story as Maria; Glass Mask as Maya Kitajima; Mobile Suit Zeta Gundam as Reccoa Londe; High School! Kimengumi as Masuyo Ikari; Ninja Scroll as Zakuro; Arion as Athena; Legend of the Galactic Heroes as Hildegard von Mariendorf; Cooking Papa as Nijiko Araiwa; Pokémon as Cassidy; D.Gray-man as Klaud Nine; Kyo Kara Maoh! as Cecilie von Spitzweg; Appleseed as Deunan Knute; Naruto as Tsunade; One Piece as Charlotte Smoothie
- Height: 163 cm (5 ft 4 in)

Masako Katsuki (勝生 真沙子, Katsuki Masako; born Shiono (塩野), October 15, 1958) is a Japanese actress, voice actress and narrator formerly affiliated with Theater Echo and now with 81 Produce. Following her debut in Shiroi Kiba: White Fang Monotagari as the role of Mary Scott, Katsuki has lent her voice to several notable anime, Japanese-dubbed films and TV series, games, drama CDs, narration, and commercials. Some of her best-known roles include: Maria Von Trapp in Trapp Family Story, Reccoa Londe in Zeta Gundam, Maya Kitajima in Glass Mask, Masuyo Ikari in High School! Kimengumi, Michiru Kaioh/Sailor Neptune in Sailor Moon and Tsunade in Naruto.

== Filmography ==
=== Anime ===
List of voice performances in anime
Year	Title	Role	Notes	Source
1981	Urusei Yatsura	Ten's mother		
1982	Gyakuten! Ippatsuman	OL-san, Otoshima-san		
1982	Magical Princess Minky Momo	Kate, Linda		
1982	White Fang	Mary Scott	Debut role	
1982	The Kabocha Wine	Akiyama's wife		
1982	Cobra the Animation	Mason		
1983	Mirai Keisatsu Urashiman	Mya		
1983	Galactic Whirlwind Sasuraiger	Asteroid queen		
1983	Super Dimension Century Orguss	Athena Henderson		
1983	Special Armored Battalion Dorvack	Peter		
1984	Glass Mask	Maya Kitajima	1st TV series	
1984	ja:よろしくメカドック	Anjii, Minako-sensei		
1985	Mobile Suit Z Gundam	Reccoa Londe		
1985	Dream Hunter Rem	Asuka Saeko/Demonic Lady		
1985	The Transformers (TV series)	Chromia	seasons 1 & 2	
1985	Blue Comet SPT Layzner	Mei		
1985	Ninja Senshi Tobikage	Kochou		
1985	High School! Kimengumi	Ikari Masuyo		
1986	Uchūsen Sagittarius	スープ屋店員		
1986	Dragon Ball	Mera		
1986	Maison Ikkoku	Hobo A, Yuko		
1986	Machine Robo: Revenge of Cronos	Solitaire		
1986	Transformers 2010	Mira, Arcee, Allegra	The Transformers season 3	
1987	Metal Armor Dragonar	Diane Lance		
1987	Fist of the North Star 2	Leia		
1987	Digital Devil Story: Megami Tensei	Izanami	OVA	
1987	Machine Robo: Battle Hackers	Mother Computer Rim		
1987	Lily C.A.T.	Nancy Sutoraha	OVA	
1987	Dangaioh	Shazara		
1987	Mister Ajikko	Takechi Komasa		
1988	Sonic Soldier Borgman	Memory Gene		
1988	Mashin Hero Wataru	Marionette		
1988	Appleseed	Deunan Knute	OVA 1988	
1988	Ronin Warriors	Kayura		
1988	Crying Freeman	Kimie		
1988	Anpanman	Tekka no maki-chan		
1988	Gunbuster	Kimiko Higuchi, Reiko Kashihara		
1988	Hades Project Zeorymer	Rockfell	OVA	
1988	Legend of the Galactic Heroes	Hildegard von Mariendorf	OVA series	
1989	Jushin Liger	Dollsatan		
1989	ja:新ビックリマン	真因如		
1989	Gosenzo-sama Banbanzai!	Maroko Yomota	OAV series	
1989	Koiko no Mainichi	Kayo	OVA	
1989	Patlabor: The TV Series	Kansei Fuwa		
1989	Gaki Deka ja:がきデカ	Michiko Abe		
1989	Ranma ½	Yokihi, Mio		
1989	Dragon Quest	Tiara		
1990	My Daddy Long Legs	Mary Lambart		
1990	Mobile Suit SD Gundam: SD Gundam Legend	Palas Athena		
1990	NG Knight Ramune & 40	Beppiin		
1990	Musashi, the Samurai Lord	Himiko		
1990–91	The Hakkenden	Funamushi, Tamazusa	1st OVA series	
1990	ja:ピグマリオ	Donomaga		
1991	Trapp Family Story	Maria Kutchara (Maria Von Trapp)		
1991	The Brave Fighter of Sun Fighbird	Yoshiko Kunie		
1991	Future GPX Cyber Formula	Rudorihihi ルードリッヒ		
1991	Armored Police Metal Jack	Kyoko Murakami		
1991	Sukeban Deka	Remi Mizuchi	OAV	
1991	Mobile Suit Gundam 0083: Stardust Memory	Lucette Odeby	Ep. 11	
1991	Michite Kuru Toki no Mukō ni	Flora	special	
1991	Oniisama e...	Aya Misaki		
1991	Yūkan Club	Kenbish Yuuri		
1991–92	The Heroic Legend of Arslan	Faranguis	OVA series eps 1 & 2	
1991	ja:わたしとわたし ふたりのロッテ	Gurukubaruu-sensei グルックバウル先生		
1992	Ruri-iro Princess	Shiina		
1992	Cooking Papa	Nijiko Araiwa		
1992	Crayon Shin-chan	Matsu Matsuzaka, Taeko Yoshi		
1992	ja:2020年ワンダー・キディ	Bibira		
1992	Super Zugan ja:スーパーヅガン	Yuka		
1992	Jeanine with the Light Brown Hair	Diana		
1992	Apfel Land Story	Arianna		
1993	わすれるもんか！	Junichi's mother	OVA	
1993	The Irresponsible Captain Tylor	test officer		
1993	Fight!! Spirit of the Sword	Arare/Fujisawa		
1993–98	Bad Boys	Erika Sato	OAV	
1993	Black Jack	Captain Maria Carnera	OAV ep 3	
1993	Art of Fighting	King		
1993–96	Ranma ½	Natsume	OVA eps 5 & 6	
1994	Shonan Junai Gumi	Izumo Mariko		
1994–97	Sailor Moon series	Michiru Kaioh / Sailor Neptune		
1994	Metal Fighter Miku	Saki Kisugi (Aquamarine)		
1994	Ogre Slayer	Sae Goto		
1994	Darkside Blues	Tamaki		
1994	The Rapeman Anime Version	Maki Otani (Red Cat)	OVA Adult	
1995	Azuki-chan	Sendai's aunt		
1995	ja:世界名作童話シリーズ ワ〜ォ!メルヘン王国	Witch of the West		
1995	Princess Minerva	Dynastar		
1995	Miyuki-chan in Wonderland	Humpty Dumpty	OVA	
1995	Megami Paradise	Mamamega previous		
1995	Neon Genesis Evangelion	Female doctor, announcer		
1996	Case Closed	Shizuka Hattori	Ep. 263	
1996	Bakusō Kyōdai Let's & Go!!	Tamami Yanagi		
1996	Dragon Ball GT	Otohime		
1996–97	Starship Girl Yamamoto Yohko	Admiral Zena Leon	both OVA series	
1996	After War Gundam X	Vedba Morute		
1996	Burn-Up W	Terrorist Chief	OVA	
1996	Hell Teacher Nūbē	Minako-sensei		
1996	Battle Team Lakers EX	Chiaki/Kung-fu Laker	OAV	
1996	Apocalypse Zero	Hamuko		
1997	Denji Sentai Megaranger	Nejiiero		
1997	Bakusō Kyōdai Let's & Go!! WGP	Cindy		
1997	Pokémon	Yamato (Cassidy)		
1997	Mach GoGoGo	Accela		
1997	Kindaichi Shounen no Jikenbo	Shirou Tendou, Woman shopkeeper	eps 95-99	
1997	ja:救命戦士ナノセイバー	Saori Tanimura		
1997	Fair, then Partly Piggy	Meg		
1997	Kigyou Senshi Yamazaki: Long Distance Call	Rika		
1997	Doctor Slump	Polly Buckets, Caramel Man No. 6		
1998	Yu-Gi-Oh!	Chono		
1998	The Mysterious Cities of Gold	Marinche	rebroadcast version	
1998	Weiß Kreuz	Hell		
1998	Golgo 13: Queen Bee	Sonia	OVA	
1998	Dōkyūsei 2	Hikari		
1998	St. Luminous Mission High School	Jasmine Koda		
1998	Kurogane Communication	Lavinia		
1999	Pocket Monsters: Episode Orange Archipelago	Yamato		
1999	Phantom Thief Jeanne	Akira Kotsuchiya		
1999	Starship Girl Yamamoto Yohko	Admiral Zena Leon	TV series	
1999	Sensual Phrase	Misa Ito		
1999	Seraphim Call	Miyabi	Ep. 6	
1999	Pocket Monsters: Episode Gold & Silver	Yamato		
1999	Harlock Saga	Emeraldas		
2000	Hamtaro	Maria's mother		
2000	Strange Dawn	Levian		
2000	Descendants of Darkness	Maria's mother		
2000	Inuyasha	Mizugami-sama		
2000	Sin: The Movie	Kait Palmer		
2000–01	Keibiin	Branch manager	Adult OVA series	
2001	Shaman King	Zria Gagarik		
2001	Ojamajo Doremi	Ichikawa		
2001	Salaryman Kintarō	Kyoko Sakurai		
2001	Noir	Bourne		
2001	Great Dangaioh	Chisato Kazamaki, Chiho Kazamaki		
2001	探偵少年カゲマン	Beauty Face		
2001	Najica Blitz Tactics	Queen		
2001	Vandread: The Second Stage	Liz		
2002	The Twelve Kingdoms	Haku Sanshi, Ribi		
2002	Atashin'chi	Ogawa-sensei		
2002	Princess Tutu	Paulamoni		
2002	Pocket Monsters: Advanced Generation	Yamato		
2002	Pocket Monsters Side Stories	Yamato		
2003	L/R: Licensed by Royalty	Ms. Camille		
2003	Astro Boy	Rabia		
2003	Dear Boys	Misako Sakakibara		
2003	Ninja Scroll: The Series	Ubume		
2003	ja:凧になったお母さん	Ichiro's mother		
2003	Mermaid's Forest	Nanao's mother		
2003	Planetes	Sally Silverstone		
2003	MegaMan NT Warrior Axess	Eve Moreshan		
2003	Gungrave	Miranda		
2004	Naruto	Tsunade		
2004	Angelique	Queen	OVA4 series	
2004–08	Kyo Kara Maoh! series	Cäcilie von Spitzweg		
2004	Samurai Champloo	Hotaru		
2004	Zoids: Fuzors	Samantha		
2004	Bleach	Yoshino Soma, Ran'Tao		
2004	Black Jack	Hachiya's wife	TV series	
2004	Yakitate!! Japan	Maetel		
2005	千年の約束	Sumire	OVA	
2005–07	Buzzer Beater series	Coach		
2005	Majime ni Fumajime: Kaiketsu Zorori	Yuki-onna		
2005	Glass Mask	Utako Himekawa	2nd TV series	
2005–06	Tsubasa: Reservoir Chronicle	Kiishimu	Also second season	
2005	The Snow Queen	Anya		
2005	Gun Sword	Earl		
2006	Wan Wan Celeb Soreyuke! Tetsunoshin	Seiko Kamata		
2006	Gin Tama	Otsu's mother		
2006	Kirarin Revolution	Haruko Misora		
2006	The Third	Cindy		
2006	Powerpuff Girls Z	Christmas Rose		
2006	Koi suru Tenshi Angelique	Sendai Queen 先代女王		
2006	ja:シルクロード少年 ユート	Kaiyu		
2006	Pocket Monsters: Diamond and Pearl	Yamato		
2006	D.Gray-man	Klaud Nine		
2006	Buso Renkin	Alexandria		
2006	Code Geass	Mrs. Statfeld		
2006	Ghost Slayers Ayashi	Toyokawa		
2006	Hataraki Man	Utako Sekiguchi		
2007	Naruto Shippuden	Fifth Hokage・Tsunade		
2007	Gurren Lagann	Okami		
2007	GeGeGe no Kitarō	Osakabe-hime	5th TV series	
2007	Kishin Taisen Gigantic Formula	Amalia Lambert		
2007–12	The Familiar of Zero series	Sheffield	Seasons 2-4	
2007	Pururun! Shizuku-chan Aha	Shabon-san		
2008	Kamen Rider Kiva	Silk Moss Fangaia シルクモスファンガイア	tokusatsu	
2008	Kirarin Revolution Stage-3	Namariko Aoyagi		
2008	op Secret ~The Revelation~	Akiko Nanase		
2008	Golgo 13	Madame Martin		
2008	Linebarrels of Iron	Judy Brown		
2008	ja:ねぎぼうずのあさたろう	さといものおさと		
2008	Michiko & Hatchin	Zoe		
2009	Gokujō!! Mecha Mote Iinchō	Himeno gakuen-cho.姫乃学園長		
2010	Gokujō! Mecha Mote Iinchō Second Collection	Saeko Takagi		
2010	Rainbow: Nisha Rokubō no Shichinin	Obasan		
2010	Panty & Stocking with Garterbelt	Hell Pound		
2010	Bakuman	Akihito's mother		
2010	Star Driver	Nichi Goshiki		
2011	Hoshizora e Kakaru Hashi	Minamiko Kubaru-sensei		
2011	Shakugan no Shana Final	Sophie Sawallisch		
2012	Tantei Opera Milky Holmes: Act 2	ミナミハルコ		
2012	NARUTO -ナルト- SD ロック・リーの青春フルパワー忍伝	Fifth Hokage・Tsunade		
2012	Shirokuma Café	Okami		
2012	Kamisama Kiss	Tayama		
2013	Hakkenden: Eight Dogs of the East series	Tamazusa		
2014	Chaika - The Coffin Princess	Claudia Dodge		
2015	Tantei Kageki Milky Holmes TD	Jeanne		
2015	The Rolling Girls	Shima Ishizukuri		
2016	Regalia: The Three Sacred Stars	Margaret Burnley	Eps. 2-9	
	JaJa Uma! Quartette	Aiya		
	Sanctuary	Houjou's lover		
	Case Closed	Mimura Yukari	eps 210 & 211	
	Kindaichi Shounen no Jikenbo Operazakan Aratanaru Satsujin	Touno Seiko		
	Mosaica	Valkeena		
	Mozaika	Valkina		
	Isoro Tengoku 居候天国	Hitomi Mizuhara	Adult OVA, as Masami Kawashita	
2017	ID-0	Cecilia Ginney		
2017	One Piece	Charlotte Smoothie		
2019	Kochoki: Wakaki Nobunaga	Dota Gozen		
2020	Magatsu Wahrheit -Zuerst-	Marie		
2020	Super Dragon Ball Heroes	Towa	Ep 27 / Big Bang Mission Ep 7	
2021	Wonder Egg Priority	Sachiko	Ep 3	
2022	Fanfare of Adolescence	Naoko Saionji		
2023	The Duke of Death and His Maid	Ichi	Season 2	
2025	Sakamoto Days	Miya	Ep 14-15	

=== Films ===
List of voice performances in feature films
Year	Title	Role	Notes	Source
1986	Arion	Athena		
1986	Love is an Open Door 扉を開けて	Neryura		
1987	Murasaki Shikibu Genji Monogatari	Wet Nurse Shounagon	1987 film	
1990	Maroko	Maroko Yomota		
1992	Apfel Land Story ja:アップフェルラント物語	Ariana Vuishinsuka		
1993	Ninja Scroll	Zakuro		
1994	Sailor Moon S: The Movie	Sailor Neptune		
1995	Sailor Moon Super S: The Movie	Sailor Neptune		
1996	Nintama Rantarou	Sina Yamamoto		
1996	Kindaichi Case Files	Seiko Mauetera		
1998	Welcome to Lodoss Island!	Pirotess		
1999	Gundress: The Movie	Takako Houraji		
2002	Guilstein ja:ギルステイン	Nu		
2002	Soreike! Anpanman	Tekka no maki-chan		
2004	Nitaboh: The Shamisen Master ja:NITABOH 仁太坊-津軽三味線始祖外聞	Tamana		
2004	Naruto the Movie: Ninja Clash in the Land of Snow	Fifth Hokage・Tsunade		
2005	ja:映画 ふたりはプリキュア Max Heart	Yami no seki no majo (Devil)		
2005	Zeta Gundam A New Translation: Heirs to the Stars	Reccoa Londe		
2005	Zeta Gundam A New Translation II: Lovers	Reccoa Londe		
2006	Zeta Gundam A New Translation III: Love is the Pulse of the Stars	Reccoa Londe		
2006	Naruto the Movie: Guardians of the Crescent Moon Kingdom	Fifth Hokage・Tsunade		
2007	Naruto Shippuden the Movie	Fifth Hokage・Tsunade		
2008	Naruto Shippuden the Movie: Bonds	Fifth Hokage・Tsunade		
2009	Naruto Shippuden the Movie: The Will of Fire	Fifth Hokage・Tsunade		
2010	Naruto Shippuden the Movie: The Lost Tower	Fifth Hokage・Tsunade		
2011	Pretty Cure All Stars DX3: Deliver the Future! The Rainbow-Colored Flower That Connects the World	Yami no seki no majo (Devil)		
2011	Naruto the Movie: Blood Prison	Tsunade		
2012	.hack//The Movie	Yuka Kamachi		
2012	Road to Ninja: Naruto the Movie	Tsunade		

=== Video games ===
List of voice performances in video games
Year	Title	Role	Notes	Source
1994	Asuka 120% Burning Fest	Tamaki	PlayStation	
1994	Princess Minerva	Chiroria	PC-Engine	
1995	The Legend of Xanadu II	Media	PC-Engine	
1996	Sailor Moon SuperS Shin Shuyaku Soudatsusen	Sailor Neptune	PlayStation	
1996	Melty Lancer: Ginga Shoujo Keisatsu 2086	Lavenne		
1996	Sailor Moon SuperS - Various Emotion	Sailor Neptune	Sega Saturn	
1997	Boys Be...	Fujii Naoko, Chiba Shouko	PS1/PS2	
1997	Next King: Koi no Sennen Oukoku	Charaway	PlayStation	
1997	ja:ネクストキング 恋の千年王国	Callaway Goldenrod	PS1/PS2	
1997	Dokyusei 2	Mirei Katagiri, Hikari	Sega Saturn	
1997	Virus Buster Serge	Shelly, Secretary	Sega Saturn	
1998	Back Guiner バックガイナー ～よみがえる勇者たち～ 覚醒編 ガイナー転生	Tomoe Segawa	PS1/PS2	
1998	ja:ポポローグ	Laura	PS1/PS2	
1998	Guardian Recall		PlayStation	
1998	Princess Quest	Madeleine	Sega Saturn	
1999	Circadia ja:サーカディア	Sayaka Inui	PS1/PS2	
2000	Undercover A.D. 2025 Kei	Samejima Kei	Dreamcast	
2000	Cosmowarrior Zero	Lady Emeraldas	PS1/PS2	
2000	Eve Zero: The Ark of the Matter	Ruth Bratchford	Also Complete edition	
2000	Scandal スキャンダル	Shanmao	PS1/PS2	
2001	Inuyasha	Suijin	PlayStation	
2002	Eve Zero	Ruth Bratchford		
2003	Silent Line: Armored Core	Sara Kurowaru	PS1/PS2	
2003	Arc the Lad: Twilight of the Spirits	Taiyana Monica Karloff	PS1/PS2	
2003	ja:サンライズ英雄譚	Diane Lance, Yoshiko Kunieda	PS1/PS2	
2003	Everybody's Golf 4	Nina	PS1/PS2	
2004	ja:コロッケ!4 バンクの森の守護神	Caviar		
2004	Zoids Vs. III	Samantha		
2005	Gunbuster	Kimiko Higuchi, Reiko Kashihara	PS1/PS2	
2005	ja:ぱすてるチャイムContinue	Bennett Kojuru	Adult PC game	
2005	ja:ぱすちゃC++	Bennett Kojuru	Adult PC game	
2006	Samurai Champloo: Sidetracked	Tsukiko	PS1/PS2	
2006	Naruto: Uzumaki Chronicles		PS2	
2007	Eternal Sonata	Rudouika	Xbox 360	
2008	Trusty Bell: Chopin's Dream – Reprise	Rudouika	PS3	
2009	Maji de Watashi ni Koi Shinasai!	Umeko Kojima	Adult PC game, as Ai Nekomi	
2009	Uncharted 2: Among Thieves	Chloe Frazer	PS3	
2009	Super Robot Wars NEO	Dollar Satan	Wii	
2010	Another Century's Episode: R	Athena Henderson	PS3	
2011	Cho no Doku Hana no Kusari Genso Yawa	Kyoko Amami	Adult PC game, as Ai Nekomi	
2011	Uncharted 3: Drake's Deception	Chloe Frazer	PS3	
2012	Maji de Watashi ni Koi Shinasai! S	Umeko Kojima	Adult PC game, as Ai Nekomi	
2012	Tales of Xillia 2	Marcia	PS3	
2014	Chou no Doku Hana no Kusari ~Taishou Tsuya Koi Ibun~	Kyoko Amami	Adult video game as Ai Nekomi	
2014	Naruto Shippuden: Ultimate Ninja Storm Revolution	Tsunade (Fifth Hokage)	Xbox360	
2015	Tokimeki Mah Jong Paradise -Dear My Love-	Houjou Satsuki	Arcade	
2016	Naruto Shippuden: Ultimate Ninja Storm 4	Tsunade		
2020	Final Fantasy VII Remake	Scarlet	PS4	
2020	The King of Fighters All Star	Eileene	Android/iOS	

=== Tokusatsu ===
List of voice performances in video games
Year	Title	Role	Notes	Source
1997	Denji Sentai Megaranger	NeziYellow/NeziSophia	Eps 38-43, 47-48	
2005	Mahou Sentai Magiranger	Hades Beastwoman Queen of Hell Siren Neries	Ep 27-28	
2008	K-tai Investigator 7	Phone Braver 02		
2008	Kamen Rider Kiva	Silkmoth Fangire	Ep 42-43	

=== Drama CDs ===
List of voice performances in audio recordings
Title	Role	Notes	Source
Angelique		drama CD	
Beast of East		drama CD	
Fullmetal Alchemist Vol. 2 Itsuwari no hikari shinjitsu no kage	Woman doctor Morgan	drama CD	
Fushigi Yūgi Genbu Kaiden	Inami	Drama CD	
Garzey no Tsubasa	Rumiko	drama CD	
Kouryuu no Mimi	Margaret	drama CD	
Marouou Fuu'unden		drama CD	
Megami Paradise	Yamimega	drama CD	
Next King -Koi no Sennen Oukoku- Gaiden	Charaway	drama CD	
Shizukanaru Don – Yakuza Side Story	Tae Kondo	drama CD	
Vampire Hunter Gaiden: Shukumei no tabibito Donovan	Shanburou	drama CD	

=== Overseas dubbing ===
List of voice performances in overseas dubbing
Title	Role	Voice dub for, Notes	Source
Mary Reilly	Mary Reilly	Julia Roberts	
Michael Collins	Kitty Kiernan	Julia Roberts	
Conspiracy Theory	Alice Sutton	Julia Roberts	
Ocean's Eleven	Tess Ocean	Julia Roberts	
Ocean's Twelve	Tess Ocean	Julia Roberts	
The Lost World: Jurassic Park	Dr. Sarah Harding	Julianne Moore	
Psycho	Lila Crane	Julianne Moore	
Hannibal	Clarice Starling	Julianne Moore	
Shelter	Cara Harding	Julianne Moore	
The Silence of the Lambs	Clarice Starling	Jodie Foster	
Contact	Dr. Ellie Arroway	Jodie Foster	
Inside Man	Madeline White	Jodie Foster	
A Time to Kill	Ellen Roaku	Sandra Bullock	
Ace Ventura: Pet Detective	Lt. Lois Einhorn	Sean Young	
Antz	Princess Bala	Animation	
Assault on Precinct 13	Iris Ferry	Drea de Matteo	
Back to the Future Part II	Jennifer Parker	Elisabeth Shue	
Beautiful Boy	Vicki Sheff	Amy Ryan	
A Beautiful Mind	Alicia Nash	Jennifer Connelly	
Beetlejuice	Lydia Deetz	Winona Ryder	
Billy Bathgate	Drew Preston	Nicole Kidman	
Blackjack	Dr. Rachel Stein	Kate Vernon	
Breakdown	Amy Taylor	Kathleen Quinlan	
Burn After Reading	Katie Cox	Tilda Swinton	
Casino	Ginger McKenna	Sharon Stone	
Cast Away	Kelly Frears	Helen Hunt	
Cat People	Alice Perrin	Annette O'Toole; 1992 TV Asahi edition	
Cats & Dogs			
Cats & Dogs: The Revenge of Kitty Galore	Kitty Galore		
Child's Play 3	Kristin da Silva	Perrey Reeves	
City Heat	Ginny Lee	Irene Cara; 1988 Fuji TV edition	
Constantine	Gabriel	Tilda Swinton; 2008 TV Asahi edition	
Courage Under Fire	Captain Karen Emma Walden	Meg Ryan	
Desperate Housewives	Angie Bolen	Drea de Matteo season 6	
Domestic Disturbance	Susan Morrison Barnes	Teri Polo	
Exodus: Gods and Kings	Priestess	Indira Varma	
For Love of the Game	Jane Aubrey	Kelly Preston	
Forrest Gump	Jenny Curran	Robin Wright	
Ghostbusters II	Dana Barrett	Sigourney Weaver; 1998 TV Asahi edition	
Godzilla	Audrey Timmonds	Maria Pitillo	
Harry Potter and the Goblet of Fire	Rita Skeeter	Miranda Richardson	
Hatfields & McCoys	Levicy Hatfield	Sarah Parish	
iCarly	Marissa Benson	Mary Scheer	
Ice Princess	Tina Harwood	Kim Cattrall	
It's a Very Merry Muppet Christmas Movie	Rachel Bitterman	Joan Cusack	
In Dreams	Claire Cooper	Annette Bening	
Indecent Proposal	Diana Murphy	Demi Moore	
Intersection	Sally Eastman	Sharon Stone	
Jaws 2	Dr. Elkins	Collin Wilcox; 2022 BS Tokyo edition	
Joey	Gina Toribani	Drea de Matteo	
Joy	Terri Mangano	Virginia Madsen	
Kiss of the Dragon	Jessica	Bridget Fonda	
Legends of the Fall	Susannah Fincannon-Ludlow	Julia Ormond	
Look Who's Back	Katja Bellini	Katja Riemann	
Love Story	Jennifer "Jenny" Cavilleri	Ali MacGraw; 1988 TV Tokyo edition	
Mad Men	Andrea Rhodes	Mädchen Amick	
Malèna	Malèna	Monica Bellucci	
Mars	Leslie Richardson	Cosima Shaw	
Merlin's Apprentice	Queen of the Lake		
Miami Rhapsody	Gwyn Marcus	Sarah Jessica Parker	
Money Train	Officer Grace Santiago	Jennifer Lopez; 2000 Fuji TV edition	
Moonrise Kingdom	Social Services	Tilda Swinton	
Nineteen Eighty-Four	Julia	Suzanna Hamilton	
Only Murders in the Building	Amy Schumer		
Out for Justice	Vicky Felino	Jo Champa; 1994 TV Asahi edition	
PAW Patrol	Mayor Goodway	Animation	
PAW Patrol: The Movie	Mayor Goodway	Animation	
Pulp Fiction	Mia Wallace	Uma Thurman	
Rain Man	Susanna	Valeria Golino	
Red Planet	Kate Bowman	Carrie-Anne Moss	
Romy and Michele's High School Reunion	Michele Weinberger	Lisa Kudrow	
School of Rock	Principal Rosalie Mullins	Joan Cusack	
Scrooged	Claire Phillips	Karen Allen	
Sex and the City series and films	Samantha Jones	Kim Cattrall	
Single White Female	Allison "Allie" Jones	Bridget Fonda	
Sliver	Carly Norris	Sharon Stone	
Smash	Julia Houston	Debra Messing	
Snow White and the Huntsman	Ravenna's mother	Anastasia Hille	
Sofia the First	Flora	Animation	
Suspiria	Suzy Bannion	Jessica Harper	
The Affair of the Necklace	Marie Antoinette	Joely Richardson	
The Astronaut's Wife	Jillian Armacost	Charlize Theron	
The Book of Life	La Muerte	Animation	
The Claim	Elena Dillon / Burn	Nastassja Kinski	
The Company of Wolves	Cathy		
The Devil's Advocate	Mary Ann Lomax	Charlize Theron	
The Doors	Pamela Courson	Meg Ryan	
The End of the Tour	Patty Gunderson	Joan Cusack	
The First Wives Club	Shelly Stewart	Sarah Jessica Parker	
The French Dispatch	J.K.L. Berensen	Tilda Swinton	
The Hitcher	Nash	Jennifer Jason Leigh	
The Hudsucker Proxy	Amy Archer	Jennifer Jason Leigh	
The Iron Lady	Carol Thatcher	Olivia Colman	
The Last Shot	Valerie Weston	Calista Flockhart	
The Mothman Prophecies	Mary Klein	Debra Messing	
The Rocker	Kim Powell	Christina Applegate	
The Sentinel	First Lady Sarah Ballentine	Kim Basinger	
The Sixth Sense	Lynn Sheer	Toni Collette	
The Temp	Kris Bolin	Lara Flynn Boyle	
The Transformers	Arcee, Chromia	Animation	
The Way, Way Back	Betty Thompson	Allison Janney	
Twister	Dr. Joanne "Jo" Harding	Helen Hunt	
Wander Over Yonder	Sylvia	Animation	
When the Bough Breaks	Laura Taylor	Regina Hall	
Where the Heart Is	Lexie Coop	Ashley Judd	
Will & Grace	Grace Adler	Debra Messing	
Wolf	Laura Alden	Michelle Pfeiffer	
X2	Jean Grey	Famke Janssen	

== Discography ==
Albums

- Ame ha suki desu ka (雨は好きですか)

Character albums and songs

- Sayonara no Daimeshi (さよならの代名詞) (Yoroiden Samurai Troopers, BEST FRIENDS CD)
