= Aika R-16: Virgin Mission =

Japanese OVA series

- AIKa R-16: Virgin Mission
- Promotional art of AIKa R-16

アイカ・ルー16: バージン・ミション AIka R-16
- Genre: Adventure
- Original video animation
- Directed by: Katsuhiko Nishijima
- Produced by: Kiyoshi Sugiyama; Masashi Tsukino
- Written by: Kenichi Kanemaki
- Music by: Junichi Kanezaki; Hiroyuki Nomura
- Studio: Studio Fantasia
- Licensed by: NA: Bandai Entertainment
- Released: April 25, 2007 – October 26, 2007
- Episodes: 3
- Light novel

AIKa R-16: BORDER MISSION
- Written by: Akira Suzuki
- Published by: Hobby JAPAN
- Magazine: Novel JAPAN; Charano!
- Original run: March 30, 2007 – present
- Original video animation

AIKa ZERO
- Directed by: Noriyasu Yamauchi
- Produced by: Masashi Tsukino; Yoshihiko Fujisawa
- Written by: Kenichi Kanemaki
- Music by: Kouichirou Kameyama
- Studio: Studio Fantasia
- Released: July 5, 2009 – August 25, 2009
- Episodes: 3
- Manga

AIKa Zero Cute
- Written by: Rion Senju
- Published by: Bandai Visual
- Magazine: Yomban
- Original run: July 2009 – August 2009

Aika R-16: Virgin Mission (stylized AIKa R-16:VIRGIN MISSION) is a Japanese three-episode OVA series animated by Studio Fantasia. Developed as a prequel to the Agent Aika OVA series, it was released on the tenth anniversary of said series. It takes place ten years prior to the events of Agent Aika and follows the story of Aika's first mission when she is 16 years old. The series was followed by a three-episode OVA sequel called Aika Zero where she is 19 years old. As with its predecessor, both series are known for their abundance of fan service in the form of panty shots and nudity. Aika R-16: Virgin Mission was acquired by Bandai Entertainment.

== Plot ==
The mini-series follows 16-year-old Aika Sumeragi, who recently got her C-class license to be a salvager, a person who searches for treasure among the ruins of the Earth's cities which have been submerged following worldwide earthquakes. However, at high school, she is regularly late for class and then her posters advertising her salvaging services are taken down. However, one afternoon, she is invited by Eri Shinkai, the class president, to join her Treasure Hunting Club where they look for the coordinates hidden away in a tattoo on classmate Karen Minamino. Aika gladly accepts, but during the trip some of her schoolmates and even their club advisor attack them in an effort to try to capture Karen. Aika defeats the girls and discovers they are being controlled by some devices implanted in their bodies. As they approach the destination, Karen starts acting strangely as if she remembers being there before. At the underwater base, Aika, Eri, and Karen make their way to a locked lab, and discover Karen's true identity.

In Aika Zero, 19-year-old Aika Sumeragi is called to investigate the goings on at a private Catholic school that is run by a council group called the White Knights. In the school, the students have been mysteriously disappearing and those who have returned have no memory of the event. They discover that there are aliens who use rope-like tendrils to probe the girls, knocking them out and harvesting their energy, or possessing them to do their bidding.

== Characters ==
From left to right: Karen Minamino, Aika Sumeragi and Eri Shinkai

Aika Sumeragi (皇 藍華, Sumeragi Aika)
Voiced by: Ami Koshimizu (Japanese); Cristina Vee (English)
The title character, she enjoys piloting vehicles and works her first case as a newly licensed C-class salvager at age 16. She has short hair and usually wears red clothes. She is adept at martial arts and firearms. However, her involvement in such outside activities makes her sleep in and habitually late for school despite living in the on-campus dorms across the field. She reacts negatively to and is embarrassed by the broad displays of sexuality that she observes from her peers. According to her character profile, she lost her parents in the worldwide earthquake catastrophe and was raised by Gozo Aida. Her body harbors a secret. E.T.A.I. refers to her as Zero. Aika does not submit to the alien probing like the other girls, and it is revealed that she has some form of alien presence inside her body that allows her to defeat the yellow tendrils and turn them back on her opponent. In a supplementary manga installment Aika Zero Cute, she is a university student.

Eri Shinkai (真海 エリ, Shinkai Eri)
Voiced by: Misato Fukuen (Japanese); Kira Buckland (English)
She is the class president as well as the founder and club president of the school's Treasure Hunting Club. She has long brown hair that she styles in twin tails. She is a mystery fanatic who comes from a very wealthy family. She likes to narrate her adventures out loud and often argues with Aika, although they become friends. She is described as curious and sometimes selfish. In Aika Zero, she is a university student who reunites with Aika. She dabbles in financial transactions such as stock trades for her family's company. In contrast to Aika, she does not feel embarrassed when naked.

Karen Minamino (美波野 カレン, Minamino Karen)
Voiced by: Mamiko Noto (Japanese); Erika Weinstein (English)
A quiet and mysterious girl with long dark-blue hair. She seldom shows any facial expression, and talks only when necessary. She has a butterfly insignia on her left breast which is revealed to carry the number-encoded message "the gate of the truth will be opened by the sleeping butterfly" and a map coordinate, which is where the group heads to. Eri says that she lives in a luxury apartment by herself and buys expensive things. She later reveals that she has amnesia, but begins to recall things are they approach their destination. In the third episode, it is revealed that Karen was a clone from a genetic experiment, possessing high intelligence and youth. In Aika Zero, she has short hair, and works at a maid cafe. She helps Aika and Eri on their investigation of St. Aero school. When Aika and Eri mention they are 19 years old, she proclaims her age as "eternally 17 years old".

Risako Nagisa (凪紗 りさこ, Nagisa Risako)
Voiced by: Naoko Suzuki (Japanese); Tara Platt (English)
Aika's teacher who punishes Aika for being consistently late for school for over a month. As the advisor of the Treasure Hunting Club, she wears incredibly sexy clothes that make the guys swoon, and the main girls extremely jealous. In the story, she reveals herself to be working for the enemy as she forces students to attack Aika and Eri and kidnap Karen using remote-controlled body implants. She is eventually defeated by Karen during the beach-side fight with Aika, but appears in the epilogue where she scolds Aika for being late again. In Aika Zero, she serves as Karen's guardian, and participates in the St. Aero mission, rescuing Aika when the latter is first disabled by the enemy, and helping Karen and the gang in the follow-up investigations.

Gozo Aida (相田 郷造, Aida Gōzo)
Voiced by: Akio Ōtsuka (Japanese); Russell Thor (English)
A salvager who watches over Aika and has trained her in the craft. He is the founder of the KK Corporation, which spawned much of the salvaging industry. Some of his remarks bother Aika, but he tries to help out whenever she is in danger. His hobby is karaoke. In Aika Zero he continues to watch over Aika, and also maintains the plane that she flies.

Gusto (ガスト, Gasuto)
Voiced by: Hiroyuki Yoshino (Japanese); Sam Regal (English)
Although he is from a rich family, he works as a servant for Eri's private cruiser. He appears in the Aika R-16 series but not the Aika Zero one.

Captain (船長, Senchō)
Voiced by: Takaya Kuroda (Japanese); David Vincent (English)
The captain of the Regina Eri cruiser which takes the gang to the island. He has orders to ensure that Eri returns safely. He uses an M21 sniper rifle. He is also involved in Aika Zero to help Eri in her operations.

Miyu Shiratori (白鳥 美由, Shiratori Miyu)
Voiced by: Yuko Goto
She has long purple hair and appears in Aika Zero. She leads the White Knights, and is the student council president at St. Aero. She is described as beautiful, mysterious, and calm, even in the midst of the investigations. The prologue shows that she is the first of the girls who encounter the alien presence while exploring a cave below the school a year prior. She has a symbiotic relationship with the aliens as exhibited by the tendrils from her back. Following her defeat, she is acquired by the Hagens for their research.

Rin Shirakiku (白菊 凛, Shirakiku Rin)
Voiced by: Mikako Takahashi
She has short green hair and appears in Aika Zero. She is a member of the White Knights that serve Miyu. She is described as having a friendly personality. She is originally jealous that Miyu overtook her academically, but after being probed by the aliens, she serves Miyu and becomes the treasurer of the student council.

Kana Shiraishi (白石 香奈, Shiraishi Kana)
Voiced by: Asami Shimoda
She has light brown hair styled in short but broad bunches and appears in Aika Zero. She is a member of the White Knights and has a provocative attitude. She became the vice-president of the student council when Miyu took over. She is shot down by Aika after her and Rin's shields fail to hold up against Aika's attack.

E.T.A.I.
Voiced by: Miyuki Sawashiro
She is very tall and has long dark-brown hair. She is described as mysterious and operates in the background. She acts as Miyu's bodyguard. Her name is an acronym for Extra Terrestrial Artificial Intelligence. She emits the alien tendrils that knock out the other girls. She later reveals that Aika is an organism much like her but has evolved to be different. She is defeated by Aika after her tendril spear attack is repelled and thrown back at her as she sacrifices herself to protect Miyu, but appears in the epilogue to work with the Hagens.

Nina Hagen (ネーナ・ハーゲン, Nēna Hāgen)
Voiced by: Houko Kuwashima
She has pink hair styled in twin drills. She appears in Aika Zero as a student at St. Aero where she notices some of Aika and the student council actions. At the end of Aika Zero she and Rudolf take in E.T.A.I. and Miyu for further research.

Rudolf Hagen (ルドルフ・ハーゲン, Rudorufu Hāgen)
Voiced by: Kousuke Okano
The future antagonist appears in the Aika Zero prequel. He has short blue hair. He is working as a commander in the military.

== Episode list ==
The Aika R-16: Virgin Mission opening theme is "Sailing to the Future", while the ending theme is "Rise." Both songs were performed by Ami Koshimizu.

The Aika Zero opening theme is "Flying Kid", while the ending theme is "Dream Hunter". Both were also performed by Koshimizu. Accompanying the second OVA series is a set of one-shot manga called Aika Zero Cutie, which features other adventures of when 19-year-old Aika is in college. The first installment was released on July 1, 2009, and the second was released on August 3.

=== Aika R-16 ===
| No. in series | No. in season | Title | Original release date |
|---|---|---|---|
| 1 | 1 | "Secret Game" "Shīkuretto・Gēmu" (Japanese: シークレット・ゲーム) | April 25, 2007 |
Aika Sumeragi drives a salvaging submarine with Gozo Aida. After getting her C-class license, she shows up late for school again and must wash all the windows as punishment. Meanwhile her posters advertising her salvaging services are taken down by the student council. However, the class president Eri Shinkai invites her after school to join her Treasure Hunting Club, using the offer of piloting one of her company's subs as the hook. She meets Karen Minamino, a quiet girl who bears a tattoo that is revealed to have the coordinates of a location out in the seas. Accepting the offer, Aika joins Eri and Karen aboard her private cruiser. However, during their voyage they are attacked by some of the club members who try to kidnap Karen, and are revealed to be controlled by their club advisor Risako Nagisa.
| 2 | 2 | "Peach Peach Beach" "Pīchi・Pīchi・Bīchi" (Japanese: ピーチ・ピーチ・ビーチ) | July 27, 2007 |
The Cruiser Eri manages to reach the island close to the destination. Eri and the gang have a beach party, but Risako turns more of the girls against Aika, Eri, and Karen. With Karen's help, Aika fights off the girls and they defeat Risako.
| 3 | 3 | "Deep Blue Girl" "Dīpu・Burū・Gāru" (Japanese: ディープ・ブルー・ガール) | October 26, 2007 |
With the rest of the girls recovering from the beach party incident, Aika, Eri, and Karen are left to explore the destination by themselves. They use a sub to head to the depths where they find an underground base, complete with airport runway. Karen begins to recall things about the base, and leads the way to a lab area. As Karen is the key to opening the lab doors, Aika and Eri put her to sleep and unlock the lab, only to discover a large number of chambers and a bunch of clones that look like Karen. However, the clones are not friendly, attacking the two girls until Aika beats down most of them. Then a giant Karen arrives and beats up Aika. Aika retreats to wake up Karen, who communicates to the giant Karen to make peace, and they are able to leave.

=== Aika Zero ===
| No. in series | No. in season | Title | Original release date |
|---|---|---|---|
| 4 | 1 | "White Knights" "Howaitonaitsu" (Japanese: ホワイトナイツ) | July 5, 2009 |
19-year-old Aika reunites with Eri and Karen to investigate the serial disappearances of school girls at St. Aero academy. Some of the girls have returned but without any memories of what has happened. While going undercover as students, they discover that the student council group called the White Knights have been abducting the students, and that they are in cahoots with an alien force that penetrates and captures the girls using rope-like tendrils of light. Aika is captured by the alien, but is rescued by Risako.
| 5 | 2 | "E.T.A.I." | August 25, 2009 |
Miyu's back story is expanded upon regarding how she encountered the aliens and then influences her classmates to join her in the student council. The army takes over responsibility for the investigation. When Karen goes in undercover, she notices the council has deserted the chapel. Meanwhile, the Hagens have been observing their actions. When the White Knights capture more girls, Aika raids the underground.
| 6 | 3 | "Zero" "Zero" (Japanese: ゼロ) | August 25, 2009 |
E.T.A.I. holds Aika captive and attempts to probe her, but the tendrils are broken by Aika's inherent power. E.T.A.I. and Miyu go to the spaceship where E.T.A.I. reveals that Aika has alien powers like her. After Aika defeats Rin and Kana, she reunites with Karen and Risako and they find the captured girls. Aika defeats Miyu and E.T.A.I. and then goes after the spaceship where, with the help of the military, they shoot it down. Aika returns safely. During the closing credits, Miyu and E.T.A.I. are taken in by the Hagens.

== Reception ==
Carl Kimlinger of Anime News Network gave the series an overall grade of C, criticizing its excessive fan service, superficial plot, stereotypical characters and underdeveloped post-apocalyptic setting. However, he praised director Katsuhiko Nishijima for making the absurd abundance of fan service humorous rather than entirely exploitative, despite what Kimlinger considered a regressive portrayal of women. He commended the fight choreography but criticized the allocation of animation resources to fan service at the expense of action sequences and backgrounds. Kimlinger also praised the English dub, finding it more consistently entertaining than the Japanese original, particularly highlighting the performances of Kira Buckland and Cristina Valenzuela. He concluded that fan service and quality were not mutually exclusive, citing Kirameki Project as a more successful example from the same studio.

Writing in the third edition of The Anime Encyclopedia (2015), Jonathan Clements and Helen McCarthy interpreted the decision to portray Aika as a younger protagonist as catering to an anime fandom trend favoring younger heroines. They criticized both prequels for retaining the original series' excessive fan service with little variation beyond the protagonist's age. They observed that the prequels recast Aika into different female archetypes, contrasting the girl next door and assertive teenager with the sophisticated adult woman of the original series.
