= Sailor Victory =

Short OVA series

聖羅ヴィクトリー
- Genre: Mecha, Superhero, Comedy
- Original video animation
- Directed by: Katsuhiko Nishijima
- Written by: Kenichi Kanemaki
- Studio: Studio Fantasia
- Licensed by: NA: Anime Works
- Released: January 25, 1995 – August 25, 1995
- Episodes: 2

Sailor Victory is a short OVA series by Katsuhiko Nishijima. The two stories in the series feature a superhero heroine team that use mechanized robots as a local crime-fighting unit. Sailor Victory is a spinoff of another 2 part OVA series called Graduation (卒業 ～Graduation～), which is also by the same director. The OVA Graduation is related to a video game of the same name. Sailor Victory was produced by Bandai Visual and released in 1995, since then the title was licensed for release in North America by Anime Works.

== Cast ==
Character	Japanese	English
Narrator		Cierra Atakkaan
Kiyomi Arai	Hiromi Tsuru	Tamara Burnham-Mercer
Shizuka Nakamoto	Aya Hisakawa	Courtney Hatfield-Wright
Reiko Takagi	Yumi Tōma	Traci Dinwiddie
Mami Shimura	Hinako Kanamaru	Pamela Weidner-Houle
Android Mami Shimura	Hinako Kanamaru	Pamela Weidner-Houle
Mika Kato	Junko Shimakata	Stephanie Anderson
Commissioner	Toshiya Ueda	Rob Zapple
Police Chief	Tomomichi Nishimura	Dave Underwood
Cop 1	Keiji Fujiwara	J.R. Rodriguez
Cop 2	Kōji Ishii	Jerry Winsett
Cop 3	Mitsuru Ogata	Jeff Johnston
Cop 4	Takehiro Murozono	Ed Wagenseller
Kid	Yumi Fukamizu	
Ikariya	Yusaku Yara	Rick Forrester
Thief	Junichi Sugawara	Chuck Denson Jr.
Margarita	Yuri Amano	Belinda Bizic-Keller

=== Additional voices ===
English: Andrew Masset, Bill Flaman, Daniel Richani, David Pickelsiemer, Edwin Holt, Pam McChino, Paul Johnson, Robin Robertson, Scott Bailey, Scott Simpson, Shaun O'Rourke

== Reception ==
The English language adaptation has received various reviews from media that specialize in the area. Anime News Network gave the series a "B" rating and compares it to the Sakura Wars franchise. In the review ANN stated that the series was faster in pacing, and surprisingly good when it comes to the humor. They gave a sole minus to the series when it comes to originality.
