= Labyrinth of Flames =

Original video animation

- Official Region 1 DVD Cover released by Central Park Media

炎のらびりんす (Honō no Rabirinsu)
- Genre: Action, Romantic comedy
- Original video animation
- Directed by: Katsuhiko Nishijima
- Produced by: Kiyoshi Sugiyama; Shigeo Kaneko (#2)
- Written by: Katsuhiko Nishijima; Kenichi Kanemaki
- Music by: Kouichi Fujino
- Studio: Studio Fantasia
- Licensed by: NA: Central Park Media
- Released: September 25, 2000 – December 21, 2000
- Episodes: 2
- icon

Labyrinth of Flames (炎のらびりんす, Honō no Labyrinth) is a Japanese two-episode OVA anime series created and produced by Studio Fantasia and directed by Katsuhiko Nishijima. It was released from September 25, 2000, to December 21, 2000. The OVA was licensed by Central Park Media under the U.S. Manga Corps label.

== Plot ==
Galan is a Russian geek who'd do anything to be a real, living samurai. When his girlfriend Natsu (who happens to be a Japanese princess living in Russia) gifts him an ancient sword, strange events unfold, and even stranger people drop out of the sky to attack. Now Galan must overcome his ineptitude and join a bunch of beautiful women in a wacky romp through a kingdom that time forgot.

== Production ==
The anime was directed by Katsuhiko Nishijima who had previously directed Project A-Ko and Agent Aika.

== Episode list ==
- Episode 1: Samurai Labyrinth? Loverinth?
- Episode 2: Treasure Labyrinth? Loverinth?

== Cast ==
Character	Japanese voice actor	English voice actor
Galan	Kōichi Tōchika	Eric Stuart
Natsu	Yuki Masuda	Jessica Calvello
Kasumi	Yukari Tamura	Elisa Wain
Datenoshin	Susumu Chiba	Tom Wayland
Carrie White	Mami Kingetsu	Sonny Dey
Shigemitsu	Shozo Iizuka	Tristan Goddard
Shinka	Yoko Sasaki	Carol Jacobanis
Nastassja Nijinsky	Ruri Asano	Blythe Witt
Narrator	Shinji Nakae	Ross Lefko

== Reception ==
Anime News Network's Maral Agnerian recommends it, calling it a "well-done 2-episode OVA that neatly balances gratuitous fanservice with bizarre comedy, with a bit of action thrown into the mix." However, THEM Anime Reviews gave it a negative review, calling the plot non-existent and mainly revolving around two things: Natsu's father being a pervert and Galan screwing up.

Dave Haverson of Play magazine praised the anime calling it "an unexpected comedy blast."
