= The Enemy's the Pirates! =

1990 Japanese original video animation

- The Enemy's the Pirates!: The Cat's Banquet

敵は海賊 ~猫たちの饗宴~ (Teki wa Kaizoku: Neko no Kyōen)
- Genre: Science fiction, action, comedy
- Original video animation
- Directed by: Katsuhisa Yamada
- Written by: Akinori Endō
- Studio: Kitty Film Mitaka Studio
- Released: 1989–1990
- Runtime: 30 minutes (each)
- Episodes: 6

The Enemy's the Pirates!: The Cat's Banquet (敵は海賊 ~猫たちの饗宴~, Teki wa Kaizoku: Neko no Kyōen) is a 1990 Japanese science fiction action comedy original video animation (OVA) series. It's based on a novel series by Chōhei Kambayashi.

== Plot ==
The action anime centers about Apulo, a cat-type alien detective from the Pirate Division, and his colleague Raul Latell Satoru, along with the Al-equipped frigate Lagendra, who pursue the largest pirate in the Solar System, Youmei Shalom Tsuzakki.

== Characters ==
- Raul Latell-Satoru: Hideyuki Tanaka
- Apullo: Yūji Mitsuya
- Lagendra: Kenyu Horiuchi
- Marsha M.: Chie Kōjiro
- Chief Buster: Shinji Ogawa
- Youmei Czaki: Jouji Nakata
- Luck Jubilee: Tesshō Genda
- Herbert Katz: Kaneto Shiozawa
- Vesta Chicago: Shingo Kanemoto
- Kali Durga: Noriko Ohara
- Old Carma: Osamu Saka
- Sergeant Petroa: Daisuke Gōri
- Maniac: Mika Doi
- Yoshizaki: Isamu Tanonaka
- Dr. Yui: Hiroshi Masuoka
- Layer: Rokurō Naya
- Deniken: Kinryū Arimoto
- Yamaki: Masashi Ebara
- Elan: Masako Oka
- Miller: Yasunori Matsumoto
- Joe: Naoki Tatsuta

== Releases ==
It was released on VHS, Laserdisc and DVD in Japan and on VHS in the United Kingdom.

== Reception ==
On Anime News Network, Justin Sevakis called the original Japanese version "bland and inoffensive", saying he "can't imagine anyone hating it, but nobody's going to really enjoy it today".

The Encyclopedia of Science Fiction described The Enemy's the Pirates! as a moderately enjoyable science fiction anime whose appeal lies primarily in its slapstick humor and the frequent banter between its protagonists. It highlighted the series' absurd, cat-centered situations, particularly its depiction of the inhabitants of Mars being transformed into cats, but criticized the often incoherent plot and excessive filer, despite the series' relatively short length. The encyclopedia suggested that the inconclusive ending might indicate that additional episodes had been planned. It also criticized the quality of the English-language dub produced for the British market.
