= Kirameki Project =

2005 OVA by Studio Fantasia

- Cover art of the DVD.

きらめき☆プロジェクト (Kirameki Purojekuto)
- Genre: Comedy, drama, mecha
- Original video animation
- Directed by: Katsuhiko Nishijima
- Produced by: Midori Isshiki; Kiyoshi Sugiyama
- Written by: Hiroshi Yamaguchi
- Music by: Koichiro Kameyama
- Studio: Studio Fantasia
- Licensed by: AnimeWorks
- Released: June 24, 2005 – February 24, 2006
- Episodes: 5

Kirameki Project (きらめき☆プロジェクト, Kirameki Purojekuto) is an anime/original animated video (OAV) that was produced by Studio Fantasia and directed by Katsuhiko Nishijima.

== Plot ==
Gene, a small European island country, is under constant threat of invasion from its neighboring countries using giant robots. Gene is ruled by three princesses, Kana, Nene and Krone. Krone, the eldest princess, has a team of men who are happy to fight for her but they do not. Nene, the youngest daughter, wears a special outfit that allows her to fight. Kana, the middle child, has designed a secret weapon; the fighter robot Junerin, a 60-meter (200 ft) tall robot that resembles a petite French doll. When a robot from Japan appears and wants to battle Junerin, Kana did not want Junerin to fight but it must do so to save the country. Several days after continuing invasions from the Japanese robot, Kana befriends Ooya, and engineer who also previously had fears of robots fighting. After Ooya's failed attempt to defeat Junerin, his boss, Shimada decides to fight her for real. Kana stops worrying about being a coward and fights back by manually controlling Junerin, which was autonomous throughout her fights. Kana defeats Shimada and his "perfect" robot and peace is returned to the kingdom.

== Characters ==
- Princess Krone:
- Princess Kana Else Gene: The middle child.
- Princess Nene:
- Rincle: A robotic creation of Kana.
- Junerin: The 60-meter (200 ft) tall robot creation of Kana, the "little sister" of Rincle.

== Reception ==
In his first of two reviews of Kirameki Project, Theron Martin of Anime News Network called Kirameki Project a "a cutesy, quirky, fan service-laden giant robot series, one clearly made by hard-core otaku for hard-core otaku". In his review of the last two episodes he commented favorably on the dramatic elements. In his Newtype USA review, Sean Sikes commented favourably on the animation techniques, stating, "the effect is stunning and adds a great visual punch to all the action–packed fight sequences". Chris Beveridge and Mark Thomas gave Kirameki Project a "C" in their lukewarm reviews at Mania.com. Jeremy Mullin of IGN describes Kirameki Project as "one very weird show" and stated the giant robot Junerin "literally looks like a giant doll [...] complete with hair, a dress ... it even has an umbrella and a purse! [...] She even provides us with fan service, throwing in some panty shots."
