= Stratos 4 =

Japanese anime television series

- Cover art of the DVD

ストラトス・フォー (Stratos4)
- Genre: Action, comedy, science fiction
- Anime television series
- Directed by: Takeshi Mori
- Produced by: Masashi Tsukino; Kiyoshi Sugiyama; Hitoshi Yagi
- Written by: Katsuhiko Takayama
- Music by: Masamichi Amano
- Studio: Studio Fantasia
- Licensed by: Bandai Entertainment (expired)
- Original network: TV Saitama, CTC, Kids Station, tvk, Sun TV
- English network: SEA: Animax Asia
- Original run: January 5, 2003 – August 1, 2004
- Episodes: 15
- Original video animation

Stratos 4 Advance
- Directed by: Takeshi Mori
- Produced by: Masashi Tsukino; Kiyoshi Sugiyama
- Written by: Atsuhiro Tomioka (#2–5); Takeshi Mori (#1, 6–8)
- Music by: Masamichi Amano
- Studio: Studio Fantasia
- Released: March 25, 2005 – October 22, 2006
- Runtime: 25–28 minutes (each)
- Episodes: 8
- icon

Stratos 4 (ストラトス・フォー, Sutoratosu Fō) is a Japanese anime television series by Studio Fantasia and Bandai Visual, and directed by Takeshi Mori.

== Story ==
Fifty years before the series begins, scientists learn that a group of comets will enter the Solar System on a collision course with Earth. The United Nations set up a two-tiered global defense system against the threat: the primary one being a space-based Comet Blaster group and the secondary being a ground-based Meteor Sweeper group. Most of the series takes place on an airbase on Shimoji Island in 2024, where Mikaze and her friends are tasked with defending the Earth from large fragments left over after a failed attempt by the Comet Blasters, who are based on one of seven space stations, to annihilate a comet. All is going well until a large meteorite crashes into a lightly populated island leading the girls on a run to find out the truth about the comets.

== Release ==
Originally spanning a 13-episode anime TV series, which premiered across Japan between January 5, 2003, to March 30, 2003, two additional episodes were later released direct-to-video in 2004. The series was then followed by an OVA series called Stratos 4: Advance (retitled as Stratos 4: Advance Final in the last two episodes), which spanned eight episodes that were released from March 25, 2005, to October 22, 2006.

The series has been broadcast by the anime satellite television network, Animax, across its respective networks worldwide, including East Asia, Southeast Asia, South Asia, Latin America, and other regions. The original 13-episode television series and its first subsequent two-episode OVA series were licensed for North American distribution by Bandai Entertainment USA. However, when Bandai Entertainment USA shut down, the series became unlicensed.

The series is one of the "main JSDF collaborative anime works", as noted by scholar Takayoshi Yamamura. The show's producer, Sugiyama Kiyoshi, is said to have conducted "extensive research about JSDF" with Yamamura saying that Kiyoshi is considered an "industry expert regarding collaboration between anime and JSDF."

== Episode listing ==
=== Stratos 4 (2003–2004) ===
No. in season	Title	Original release date
101	"Initial Point"	January 5, 2003
The pros show the rookies how it's done.
102	"Fox One"	January 12, 2003
The rookies have a chance to show off.
103	"Decision Height"	January 19, 2003
Mikaze breaks previous height record, but is short on fuel on the return trip so she ends up landing in Guam.
104	"Tally Ho!"	January 26, 2003
The comet fragment that Mikaze's team is intercepting suddenly changes course inexplicably, resulting in a small disaster.
105	"Go Around"	February 2, 2003
Mikaze, and later Shizuha and Ayamo are summoned to the mainland for an inquiry into the previous incident by some shady politicians with ulterior motives.
106	"Checking Six"	February 9, 2003
The cat Admiral sneaks into the base, and hilarity ensues.
107	"High Speed"	February 16, 2003
Mikaze and the gang chip in to help Mr. Sako rebuild the vintage space vehicle Stratos 0.
108	"Go Gate"	February 23, 2003
The Shimoji Island base holds its 38th festival. Mikaze, Shizuha, and Ayamo's families all come visit for a fun-filled day. However, since Karin's parents have died when she was younger, she has no family members to visit her. She feels lonely and stays away from the festivities but her friends find her and cheer her up.
109	"Vapor Trail"	March 2, 2003
It's time for a vacation to the hot springs resort, hence fanservice a-plenty.
110	"Mission Abort"	March 9, 2003
Communication with Orbital Station 7 has been cut off and an emergency has been declared on Shimoji Island base. Karin collapses just when a comet was destroyed, and she was taken away by the shady politician to an unknown destination.
111	"Target Merge"	March 16, 2003
Mikaze and Shizuha request time off from work in order to track down and help Karin, but their investigation reveals that mysterious alien lifeforms (referred to as "Star Seeds") have arrived on Earth via the comets. They can control human minds, and those under control have taken over most of Orbital Station 7, where Karin has been sent.
112	"Engage!"	March 23, 2003
The Shimoji Island base comes under lockdown by some government military unit. Mikaze, Shizuha, and Ayamo's sneak onto a transport rocket bound for Orbital Station 7 in order to save Karin.
113	"Final Approach"	March 30, 2003
With Mikaze, Shizuha, and Ayamo's help Orbital Station 7 is back under control. Together with Karin they pilot 2 comet blaster spacecraft (SAC-1B) and successfully intercept a giant comet heading for Earth.
114	"Return to Base"	May 25, 2004 (direct-to-video)
Annette and Chizuru visit Shimoji Island base carrying video recordings of Miharu's deteriorating condition in the days and weeks after alien infection. In the meantime Orbital Station 7 is hit by space debris which sets it on a collision course with Earth.
115	"Dispersion"	August 1, 2004 (direct-to-video)
Annette and Chizuru return to Orbital Station 7 aboard a cargo vessel to rescue injured and stranded crewmembers as well as retrieve some secret data for the shady government bureaucrat. The station is then destroyed mid-air by Mikaze's team.

=== Stratos 4 Advance (2005–2006) ===
No. in season	Title	Original release date
201	"Wave Off"	March 25, 2005
202	"Roll Out"	May 27, 2005
203	"Angle of Attack"	July 22, 2005
204	"Clear Air Turbulence"	September 23, 2005
205	"Dash One"	November 25, 2005
206	"Lost Position"	January 27, 2006
207	"Advanced Final: Cross-Wind Take Off"	September 22, 2006
208	"Advanced Final: Piper on the Target"	October 22, 2006
As the three giant meteors descent, causing mass panic, the CEMA takes a stand against them. Commander Reynolds then secured permission to use Stratos 4 craft confiscated earlier, and summons Mikaze, Shizuha, Ayamo, and Karin to pilot them alongside other Comet Blasters and Meteor Sweeper pilots, taking care of the last two meteors while Mikaze and the rest destroy the first due to a slight change in mission plan. The mission is completed and the extraterrestrial threat is eliminated. End credits shows the reunion between Sako and Miharu in an abandoned research facility and integration of Rei into the society, as well as fates for other main characters.

== Music ==
The music for Stratos 4 was composed by Masamichi Amano.
