= Studio Fantasia =

Japanese animation studio

Studio Fantasia Co., Ltd.
- Native name: 有限会社スタジオ・ファンタジア
- Romanized name: Yūgen-gaisha Sutajio Fantajia
- Type: Yūgen gaisha
- Industry: Japanese animation
- Predecessor: Tsuchida Production
- Founded: October 12, 1983; 42 years ago
- Founder: Tomohisa Iizuka
- Defunct: November 16, 2016; 9 years ago
- Fate: Bankruptcy
- Headquarters: Nerima, Tokyo, Japan
- Subsidiaries: Chaos Project (ended 1995)

Studio Fantasia Co., Ltd. (有限会社スタジオ・ファンタジア, Yūgen gaisha Sutajio Fantajia) was a Japanese animation studio. It was founded in October 1983 by Tomohisa Iizuka, then an employee of Tsuchida Production, as its CEO.

The company filed for bankruptcy in November 2016.

== Productions ==
=== TV series ===
Debut	Series title	Director	Series composition	Original network	No. of episodes	Notes
2001	Najica Blitz Tactics	Katsuhiko Nishijima	Ken'ichi Kanemaki	TV Kanagawa	12	Co-produced with Amber Film Works.
2003	Stratos 4	Takeshi Mori	Katsuhiko Takayama	TV Saitama	15	
2003	Rumbling Hearts	Tetsuya Watanabe	Ken'ichi Kanemaki	Chiba TV	14	Based on an adult visual novel of the same name by Âge.
2006	Strain: Strategic Armored Infantry	Tetsuya Watanabe	Masanao Akahoshi	WOWOW	13	
2008	Glass Maiden	Mitsuko Kase	Atsuhiro Tomioka	Chiba TV	12	

=== OVA/ONAs ===
- Project A-ko 3: Cinderella Rhapsody (1988)
- Demon Hunter Makaryūdo (1989)
- Project A-ko 4: Final (1989)
- A-ko the Versus (1990)
- Exper Zenon (1991)
- Madara (1991)
- Kōryū Densetsu Villgust (1992–1993)
- Compiler (1994)
- Aozora Shōjotai (1994–1996)
- Megami Paradise (1995)
- Compiler 2 (1995)
- Sailor Victory (1995)
- Fire Emblem (1996)
- Aika (1997–1999)
- Honō no Labyrinth (2000)
- Stratos 4 Advance (2005–2006)
- Rescue Me: Mave-chan (2005)
- Saikano: Another Love Song (2005)
- Kirameki Project (2005–2006)
- Sono Mukou no Mukōgawa (2005 music video)
- Aika R-16: Virgin Mission (2007)
- Aika Zero (2009)
- Nozoki Ana (2013)

=== Video games ===
- Super Real Mahjong PV (1996)
- Megami Tengoku II (1996)
- Velldeselba Senki: Tsubasa no Kunshō (1997)
- Rakugaki Showtime (1999)
- Tetris with Cardcaptor Sakura: Eternal Heart (2000)
- Rave Master (2002)
