= Najica Blitz Tactics =

Japanese anime television series

- Volume 1 DVD cover of Najica Blitz Tactics.

ナジカ電撃作戦 (Najica Dengeki Sakusen)
- Genre: Action, science fiction
- Anime television series
- Directed by: Katsuhiko Nishijima
- Produced by: Yasuki Miki; Kazuhiko Ikeguchi; Atsushi Yamamori; Tomohisa Iizuka
- Written by: Ken'ichi Kanemaki
- Music by: Jun'ichi Kanezaki
- Studio: Studio Fantasia; Amber Film Works
- Licensed by: NA: ADV Films
- Original network: TV Kanagawa, Chiba TV, TV Saitama, Kids Station
- English network: NA: Anime Network; ZA: Animax
- Original run: October 5, 2001 – December 27, 2001
- Episodes: 12
- Manga
- Written by: Takuya Tashiro
- Published by: Media Factory
- English publisher: NA: ADV Manga
- Magazine: Comic Flapper
- Original run: 2001 – 2003
- Volumes: 3
- icon

Najica Blitz Tactics (Japanese: ナジカ電撃作戦, Hepburn: Najika Dengeki Sakusen) is an anime television series by Studio Fantasia and Amber Film Works. It aired in Japan from October to December 2001. The series is similar to that of Agent Aika, both being directed by Katsuhiko Nishijima and animated by Studio Fantasia, with much of the same content.

Though Najica was later adapted into a manga by Takuya Tashiro (田代 琢也, Tashiro Takuya), the majority of the differences in content were in the context of the missions and especially the ending.

== Story ==
Najica Hiiragi is a noted perfumer for CRI Cosmetics, famous for being able to identify over 500 scents. Secretly, however, she is actually a field agent for CRI's Intelligence Bureau, an agency unknown to the public and even to most of its own employees for the sake of their own protection.

Najica is assigned the mission to recover a gynoid known as a Humaritt code-named "ZZZ" and referred to as "Lila". Najica becomes suspicious when CRI Intelligence is contracted by Shinba Industrial to recover more lost and possibly rogue Humaritts; especially since most of them are in the hands of criminals, revolutionaries, guerrillas or terrorist groups. Her suspicions increase when Lila is assigned to be her partner, even though Najica insists she be allowed to continue working alone. As time goes on, however, Najica begins to trust Lila, even if Lila's lack of social graces make her wince.

== Characters ==
- Najica Hiiragi (柊 七虹香（ひいらぎ なじか) is the title character. She is a world-class perfume maker by day at CRI Cosmetics and a special agent for CRI's Intelligence Bureau. She works to develop cosmetics with her assistant Kirala as well as partake in missions given to her by the company. All of her missions are received with a single rose. In the anime television series, Najica is voiced by Yumi Tōma in Japanese and Kira Vincent-Davis in English.
- Lila (リラ) is a gynoid known as a Humaritt code-named "ZZZ" who was rescued from a bisexual countess. She becomes Najica's partner for the series. Although at first, her lack of social grace irritates Najica, the two eventually care for one another. In the anime television series, Lila is voiced by Juri Ihata in Japanese and Monica Rial in English.
- Jin Majima (間島 甚（まじま じん）) is the CRI head and Najica's commander. He is usually seen with Gento during a mission briefing. In the anime television series, Majima is voiced by Iemasa Kayumi in Japanese and Mike Kleinhenz in English.
- Shinobu Misato (美郷 偲（みさと しのぶ）, Misato Shinobu) is a brown-haired secretary working for the CRI. In the anime television series, Shinobu is voiced by Asako Dodo in Japanese and Kim Prause in English.
- Rena Uzuki (海槻 玲奈（うづき れいな）, Uzuki Rena) is a green-haired secretary working for the CRI. In the anime television series, Rena is voiced by Sanae Kobayashi in Japanese and Melissa Williams in English.
- Gento Kuraku (玖洛 玄人（くらく げんと）, Kuraku Gento) is often Najica's informant when it comes to missions involving Humaritts. He is in love with her, and he often tries to ask her out or hit on her. In the anime television series, Gento is voiced by Unshō Ishizuka in Japanese and Andy McAvin in English.
- Kirala Mitsuboshi (御津星 キララ（みつぼし きらら）, Mitsuboshi Kirara) is Najica's assistant. She is currently working with her to perfect "The Day Series" of perfumes. In the anime television series, Kirala is voiced by Natsuko Kuwatani in Japanese and Mandy Clark in English.

== Broadcast ==
The Najica anime television series premiered on Television Kanagawa the Thursday broadcast night of October 4, 2001, at 25:40 (October 5, 2001, at 1:40 am) with broadcasts on Chiba Television Broadcasting and Television Saitama the following night. It was broadcast on Kids Station the following Thursday at 23:30, starting October 11. During the week of November 15, the first three channels did not air a new episode. Starting with episode 7 on November 22, the Kids Station Thursday night broadcast then preceded TV Kanagawa's broadcast, with the final episode airing on December 27, 2001.

=== Episode list ===
| No. | Title | Original airdate |
|---|---|---|
| 1 | "A Magnificent Secret Agent with a Rose in Her Hand" "Karei naru ējiento wa ichirin no bara to tomo ni"(華麗なるエージェントは一輪の薔薇と共に) | October 5, 2001 |
After wrapping up a successful target practice, Najica Hiiragi, a field agent for CRI's Intelligence Bureau, is summoned for her next mission with a single rose. Najica's flirty informant Gento Kuraku says that this is a recovery operation at a mansion. Once there, Najica infiltrates the mansion, managing to bypass the armed maids. In the playroom of the basement, Najica rescues a peculiar girl from a bisexual countess named Madame. Bypassing more armed maids on the rooftop, Najica retrieves the peculiar girl and makes for a quick getaway on her attack helicopter back to headquarters. Back in the city, it is revealed that Najica is a renowned perfumer at CRI Cosmetics, along with her assistant Kirara Mitsuboshi. Najica is summoned again by her commander Jin Majima, though it is hinted from secretaries Shinobu Misato and Rena Uzuki that Najica will have a new partner. When she returns to her apartment, Najica discovers that the peculiar girl is standing in her room.
| 2 | "A Pretty Partner with a Gun in Her Hands" "Karei na pātonā wa utsukushiki dangan to tomo ni"(華麗なパートナーは美しき弾丸と共に) | October 12, 2001 |
Gento tells Najica that the peculiar girl is named Lila, who is a gynoid known as a Humaritt code-named "Triple Z" (ZZZ). Majima assigns Lila as Najica's new partner. Najica and Kirala test samples of their set of perfumes called "The Day Series", trying to research the best scent for the Sunday perfume. Gento summons both Najica and Lila for their first mission. Since a judge is currently heading a major criminal investigation into the mafia, both Najica and Lila are tasked with protecting the judge's daughter Mizuho Katsura, who will be targeted during an event in an auditorium at an amusement park by twin snipers named Lindsey and Cindy, nicknamed the Blood-Sucking Angels. Noticing a disguised old woman missing from the observation desk and the Ferris wheel suddenly shut down, Najica and Lila find Lindsey at the top of the observation deck and Cindy at the top of the Ferris wheel. Najica and Lila manage to disarm the Blood-Sucking Angels from using their anti-materiel rifles and prevent an assassination attempt from happening.
| 3 | "Ugly Relics in the Jet-Black Darkness" "Shūaku naru ibutsu wa shikkoku no yami to tomo ni" (醜悪なる遺物は漆黒の闇と共に) | October 19, 2001 |
The Maraluge Military Base has been annihilated by a decommissioned laser satellite recently reactivated. A small-time scoundrel named Tod McCormick was responsible for reactivating this laser satellite, planning to sell control of it to the highest bidder. Tasked to prevent any future hostile use of the laser satellite, Najica and Lila pose as sisters and befriend Tod and his lover Nyula at a resort. Later at night, Najica and Lila infiltrate the McCormick Aviation Military History Museum, previously a control tower located at an abandoned airport. The mission is suddenly updated to include the recovery operation of Nyula, revealed to be a Humaritt who can act as a remote control system. After Tod orders Nyula to reposition the laser satellite and target London, Lila sets off explosives planted on Tod's airplane collection. Tod rushes in an attempt to extinguish the fires, while Najica and Lila head to the control room. As Lila fights Nyula in close combat, Najica reprograms the laser satellite to target the museum. Temporarily stunning Nyula with plastic bullets, Najica and Lila escape using a hijacked airplane, while the museum is destroyed by the descending laser satellite.
| 4 | "The Fictitious Star with a Sweet Trap-Like Perfume" "Itsuwari no sutā wa amai wana no kaori to tomo ni" (偽りの星（スター）は甘い罠の香りと共に) | October 26, 2001 |
Najica and Lila investigate the 4C'zNs, a Japanese idol girl group composed of Haruka, Akina, Fuyuki and Natsuyo. One of them is suspected of being a Humaritt, which notably lacks human emotions. Najica poses as a talent agent, convincing manager Ai Irie to allow Lila to join the 4C'zNs as a fifth member under the moniker "Lila Minazuki". While Lila introduces herself to the 4C'zNs, Najica discreetly scans the vital signs of the 4C'zNs, though it appears that all four might be Humaritts since they act alike. When Gento mentions that all Humaritts are tattooed with a unique serial number, Lila attempts to scan the 4C'zNs, though with no success. Najica learns from Shinobu that the 4C'zNs can give off a hypnotic effect with their voices. In a film studio, Lila is captured by the 4C'zNs, and Lila's identity as a Humaritt is exposed. Najica manages to rescue Lila, as the two split up and chase down each member of the 4C'zNs. It is eventually discovered that all four do not have a serial number. Thanks to some earplugs, Najica manages to defeat Ai, who happens to be the true Humaritt code-named "Triple I" (III).
| 5 | "The Fragile Dream with a Crimson Colored Horizon" "Shinku ni somaru suiheisen wa hakanaki yume to tomo ni" (真紅に染まる水平線ははかなき夢と共に) | November 2, 2001 |
Najica is tasked with stopping notorious criminal Ricardo Kidel, who plans to stage a coup by launching a long-range ballistic missile (LRBM) that he had purchased from the black market in a preemptive strike. With the mission also including the recovery operation of an elusive Humaritt, Najica is given special blue earrings to wear for the mission. After seeing Kidel's ship docked, Najica proceeds to a local cafe, but she is attacked by a sniper named Koharu from the crow's nest of Kidel's ship. Lila manages to disarm Koharu, and Kidel's ship sets sail. It is shown that Koharu is a Humaritt working for Kidel. Najica and Lila board an admiral's amphibious assault ship before riding a human torpedo in order to approach and infiltrate Kidel's ship heavily guarded with female sailors. Although initially failing to prevent Kidel and Koharu from boarding their submarine which carries the LRBM, it is then that Najica and Lila approach the submarine with their attack helicopter before it is momentarily gunned down. Lila ends up capturing Koharu after a fight, while Najica detonates the LRBM during its launch sequence. This destroys the submarine, while the LRBM plummets aimlessly into the ocean.
| 6 | "The Beautiful Beast's Eyes with a Lonely Shadow" "Utsukushiki yajū no hitomi wa kodoku no kage to tomo ni" (美しき野獣の瞳は孤独の影と共に) | November 9, 2001 |
After a research team from Shinba Industrial makes an emergency landing at an unclaimed territory controlled by a rival research company called Pacific Medical, a Humaritt discovered and shipped by Shinba Industrial escapes during an attack before she could be initialized by a master. Najica and Lila carry out a recovery operation of the Humaritt before lead researcher Kissling tries to capture her. The Humaritt code-named "Triple B" (BBB) is a combatant model with enhanced battle functions, which is demonstrated by the ability to wipe out a general's entire battalion. It is suggested that the safety limits of Triple B may not be functioning properly, operating three times more than her original design capabilities. Now equipped with the M2 Browning and the Kampfpistole, Najica and Lila manage to locate Triple B at a derelict building. Kissling uses nerve gas on Triple B, though she eventually overcomes its effects. When Najica finds herself cornered by Triple B, Lila manages to rescue Najica. As Najica punches Triple B in the face, Triple B exceeds her safety limits and collapses. Lila guns down Kissling and explodes his attack helicopter. With Triple B now secured, Lila suddenly faints, which shocks Najica.
| 7 | "The Murderous Bullet Shot with a Wry Smile" "Satsui no dangan wa kawaita hohoemi to tomo ni" (殺意の弾丸は乾いた微笑みと共に) | November 22, 2001 (Note: Starting with episode 7, the Kids Station's broadcast time of Thursday night 23:30 preceded TV Kanagawa's time of Thursday late night at 25:40, and thus the original airdates in the list have shifted to Thursdays to follow the times on Kids Station.) |
As Lila recovers from her injuries, Gento tells Najica that he was only hired to recover the Humaritts without knowing why they were originally built. Kirala suggests that Najica should take a work break after the latter becomes distracted when testing formula samples of lavender, sandalwood and musk. A recovery operation involves teenage mathematician Dr. Swaney Kuronikowa, who escaped from the Socialist Commonwealth of Kirnovf and went to the Zeufa Republic. Swaney is seen staying with her caretaker Daniela at a hotel, where Swaney is hiding from two government agents named Fanc and Lady. Fanc manages to find Swaney at the hotel and fatally wounds Daniela with a gunshot. Najica arrives just as Fanc and Lady escape on a motorcycle and sidecar with an unconscious Swaney in tow. After killing Fanc by launching a bazooka while on the road, Najica kills Lady in the woods by causing a wildfire with her totaled car and leaking an airplane's fuel tank. Najica manages to rescue Swaney before the airplane explodes from the leaked fuel reaching the flames. After visiting Daniela in the hospital, Najica returns to her apartment, where Lila is fully recovered.
| 8 | "The Sky of the Desire with a Swirling Battle Flame" "Yokubō no sora wa tatakai uzumaku honō to tomo ni"(欲望の空は戦い渦巻く炎と共に) | November 29, 2001 |
A recovery operation involves a Humaritt named Toni, who plans to steal a stealth fighter VTOL called the Oboro at a weapons trade fair for her master, a black market weapons broker named Rasse Punto. Azusa Katsuragi, the daughter of the president of Katsuragi Heavy Industry Inc., presents a flower bouquet to the pilot of the Oboro, but the publicity is stolen by Najica and Lila, who pose as models for an old man's outdated fighter plane, causing Azusa to express jealousy. Toni soon appears, taking Azusa as a hostage and stealing the Oboro. Najica and Lila fly the outdated fighter plane and follow the Oboro, which lands onto Rasse's ship. After leaving Azusa on Rasse's ship, Toni engage in a dogfight with Najica and Lila. Ejecting herself from the cockpit, Lila raids Rasse's ship and ultimately shoots Rasse. Although Najica destroys the Oboro, Toni survives from the blast. Najica launches a missile directly at Toni on Rasse's ship, but Toni passes out after grappling the missile. As Toni is revealed to be the Humaritt code-named "Triple W" (WWW), Gento shows Azusa that she was saved by Najica and Lila.
| 9 | "The Brave Desert Lion with the Goddess" "Yūsō naru sabaku no shishi wa megami to tomo ni" (勇壮なる砂漠の獅子は女神と共に) | December 6, 2001 |
Najica contemplates that Humaritts are capable of making their own decisions rather than only obeying the orders of their masters. Queen Metis Gilnande is the dictatorial ruler of the Gilda Empire, while the Queen's daughter Athena Gilnande is the leader of an anti-government organization called the Gilda Liberation Alliance. A recovery operation involves a Humaritt named Elith, who is Athena's personal assistant. As Najica and Lila infiltrate the base for the Gilda Liberation Alliance at an old penitentiary, their covers are blown as Athena takes Najica to the interrogation room while Elith throws Lila into a pit. When an army division approaches the base, Athena eventually chooses to surrender, but Elith kills Athena with a gunshot and takes over as leader. Najica witnesses this after escaping from the interrogation room, while Lila makes her first decision by saving herself and charging into the base with a tank. However, Elith faces denial when Najica and Lila inform that the other members of the Gilda Liberation Alliance have retreated. It is shown that Gento has recovered Elith in the aftermath. The news reports that Alukureyna, a member of the Gilda Liberation Alliance, staged a coup against the government and overthrew the Queen.
| 10 | "The Final Destination of the Battle with Dangerous Love" "Tatakai no shūchakueki wa kiken na ai to tomo ni" (闘いの終着駅は危険な愛と共に) | December 13, 2001 |
On a passenger train in the snowy forest, Najica and Lila must recover a Humaritt named Serina and protect a man named Yoshiki Kamiwazumi, who are forbidden lovers running away from Dr. Rinka Ren, the leading authority on engineering artificial life at Shinba Industrial. Serina is revealed to be the Humaritt code-named "Triple H" (HHH). Lila finds out that Serina has been fending off a growing party of Humaritt soldiers sent by Dr. Ren, unbeknownst to Yoshiki. Before the Humaritt soldiers detonate the passenger train during their raid, Najica and Lila lead Serina and Yoshiki to safety, seeking shelter at a log cabin. Later on, the Humaritt soldiers shoot rocket launchers at the log cabin, causing Najica, Lila, Serina and Yoshiki to land outside. As Yoshiki passes out, Serina angrily fends off the Humaritt soldiers. At a waterfall, Serina expresses separation anxiety before engaging in a duel against Najica, who tells Lila not to get involved. Serina stops herself from executing a dual wielding attack when Yoshiki stands in the way. Afterwards, Serina is secured while Gento tells Yoshiki that Humaritts are not humans. During the car ride back, Lila wonders why she does not understand Najica as her partner.
| 11 | "A Farewell Mission with the Young Girl's Cordiality" "Sekibetsu no misshon wo shōjo no magokoro to tomo ni" (惜別のミッションを少女のまごころと共に) | December 20, 2001 |
Najica and Lila partner with Shinba Industrial's private army and infiltrate Shinba Industrial's research facility in order to protect Dr. Ren from danger, though it is unknown how many Humaritt soldiers will be there. Gento is relieved by the timely arrival of Shinobu and Rena, who fend off the Humaritt soldiers guarding the front entrance. However, a Humaritt code-named "Triple X" (XXX) demonstrates overwhelming capabilities, managing to target a laser satellite at the private army. Meanwhile, Swaney informs Majima that Lila has reached an emotional bond with Najica at 75%, whereas Elith had an emotional bond with Athena at 80% before Elith killed Athena. While Najica fends off Humaritt soldiers in the research facility full of debris, Lila finds a laboratory and releases a young male Humaritt named Alpha from being suspended inside a chamber. Najica later stumbles upon Triple X at the laboratory. It is shown that Alpha treats Lila like an older sister. Triple X chases after Najica in the hallways, demanding to know the whereabouts of Alpha even though Najica honestly has no idea. Using a stun grenade, Najica makes her escape to an underground subway, where Dr. Ren comes out of hiding.
| 12 | "A Gorgeous Agent with the Rose of Destiny in her Heart" "Karei naru ējiento wa kaikō no bara wo kokoro ni" (華麗なるエージェントは邂逅の薔薇を心に) | December 27, 2001 |
Dr. Ren states that she does not need protection, explaining that Shinba Industrial canceled her research on the Humaritts that she created. While evading more gunfire from the Humaritt soldiers, Najica chases Dr. Ren, soon realizing that Dr. Ren is actually Triple X based on her scent and blood. As Triple X gravely injures Najica with a gunshot, Alpha sees them and runs behind Lila, causing Triple X to feel abandoned. Najica and Lila each fail in their attempt to stop Triple X. The private army shoots missiles at the research facility, causing it to collapse even more. Najica and Lila lift heavy debris aside, learning that Triple X sacrificed her life by shielding Alpha from getting hurt. Afterwards, Lila believes that Alpha should not be turned in, but Najica says that they should not disobey orders. This climaxes to Najica and Lila aiming their guns at each other and pulling the triggers. In the aftermath, Swaney tells Kirala that Daniela has been discharged from the hospital, before noticing that Kirala has completed the Sunday perfume, called it the "fragrance of tranquility". Najica is seen taking a vacation, as she comes to terms with images of Lila and Alpha.

== Manga ==
The corresponding manga for Najica Blitz Tactics, published by Comic Flapper, came in three volumes, which were published from 2001 to 2003. ADV Manga published English translations of the manga in 2004.

== See also ==
- Stratos 4 - The finale artworks Noriyasu Yamauchi anime
