= 801 T.T.S. Airbats =

Manga by Shimizu Toshimitsu and its adaptation(s)

- North American DVD cover of 801 T.T.S. Airbats

青空少女隊 (Aozora Shōjotai)
- Genre: Comedy, Action, Military, Romance
- Manga
- Written by: Shimizu Toshimitsu
- Published by: Tokuma Shoten
- Magazine: Monthly Shōnen Captain
- Original run: July 1991 – October 1992
- Volumes: 3
- Original video animation
- Directed by: Yūji Moriyama (Chief); Junichi Sakata (#1, 3, 7); Tōru Yoshida (#2, 5); Osamu Mikasa (#4); Shin Misawa (#6)
- Produced by: Shigeru Kitayama; Shigeaki Komatsu; Ayumi Enomoto
- Written by: Ryōichi Yagi (#1, 3); Ryōe Tsukimura (#2); Yūji Yamaguchi (#4); Yōsuke Kuroda (#6); Seiya Fujiwara (#7)
- Music by: Seikō Nagaoka (#1–3); Norimasa Yamanaka (#4–7)
- Studio: Studio Fantasia
- Licensed by: NA: ADV Films
- Released: May 21, 1994 – March 15, 1996
- Runtime: 26–29 minutes (each)
- Episodes: 7
- Manga

Aozora Shoujotai Gaiden
- Written by: Shimizu Toshimitsu
- Published by: Tokuma Shoten
- Published: February 1997
- Volumes: 1
- Manga

Aozora Shoujotai ReBirth
- Written by: Shimizu Toshimitsu
- Published by: Shōnen Gahōsha
- Magazine: Young King
- Original run: December 27, 2007 – April 19, 2008
- Volumes: 2
- icon

801 T.T.S. Airbats, known in Japan as Aozora Shōjotai (青空少女隊; lit. 'The Blue Sky Girls Squad'), is a manga by Shimizu Toshimitsu which was later adapted into a seven episode anime series, produced by Studio Fantasia and Victor Entertainment. The series was released in Japan on LaserDisc as a series of OVA episodes between 1994 and 1996, and was licensed for English language distribution by ADV Films. The title has been out of print since 2005. The series had aired on TVB in Hong Kong on April 9, 1996.

== Plot ==
The plot focuses on the activities of Japan Air Self-Defense Force technician Takuya Isurugi, who is transferred to the 801st Tactical Training Squadron, an elite aerobatics team—originally a dumping ground for difficult cases and near-rejects—at the beginning of the series. Isurugi is a shy otaku who initially makes a bad impression with the four pilots of the unit, all of whom are female.

The plot quickly turns into that of a love triangle when two of the pilots, Miyuki Haneda and Arisa Mitaka, fall in love with the surprised Isurugi. This inflames their already-existing rivalry, which causes trouble for their cooperation in the air. With the JASDF already considering disbanding their unit, Isurugi must persuade the girls to work together to improve their performance and save the team.

The first three episodes circulate around the love triangle between the pilots and Isurugi, however the remaining four episodes become more typical of an anime series and feature more comical and unusual plots (such as a food eating contest amongst the crew, visiting haunted locales etc.) as well as feature more explicit details behind some of the characters' backgrounds.

== Characters ==
SSgt.Takuya Isurugi (石動 拓也, Isurugi Takuya)
The star of the series, Isurugi is an overly-eager airplane mechanic who loves everything about airplanes. He repairs and works on them for the 801st and joins the team at the start of the series. Isurugi is a very positive and upbeat person; he keeps the team's spirits high and believes anyone who loves airplanes so much can't be a bad person. He first develops a relation with Miyuki which causes jealousy within Mitaka, who even tries to split them apart by spreading rumors about Miyuki. Isurugi still cares for Mitaka however when she develops a fever, and eventually both girls fall in love with him. Isurugi nervously can't decide between the girls and states "One will be my girlfriend, the other will be my mistress!" Despite being unable to choose, Isurugi still maintains strong friendships with both girls and the others and remains positive and upbeat.
Voiced by: Shin-ichiro Miki (Japanese); Robert Newell (English)
TSgt.Miyuki Haneda (羽田 みゆき, Haneda Miyuki)
One of the top two pilots in the 801st, Miyuki is considered to be a "goody good", always being polite, friendly, kind, and not the kind to break the rules or get in trouble. She was placed in the 801st after she struck a superior officer with her hand, though Mitaka talks about the incident rather differently.
Miyuki and Mitaka do not get along at all and are polar opposites in terms of personality. Despite their rivalry, however, they manage to work together when the time comes and make an excellent team. Miyuki originally thought Isurugi was a pervert (mostly due to the fact he accidentally saw her undressing). However, she eventually grew to love him and competes for his affection alongside Mitaka.
Voiced by: Aya Hisakawa (Japanese); Sascha Biesi (English)
TSgt.Arisa Mitaka (三鷹 ありさ, Mitaka Arisa)
One of the top two pilots in the 801st, and a constant rival of Miyuki in terms of flight and love. The dusky-skinned Mitaka keeps to herself and is usually more aggressive and hostile to others; she is said to be a troublemaker and is constantly at odds with Miyuki, trying to upset her any way she can. Mitaka is a top notch pilot and has proven it on many occasions. Mitaka at first did not care for Isurugi, but became slightly jealous when he and Miyuki started dating, so she spread rumors and "faked" being sick to ruin Miyuki's relationship with Isurugi. However, she wound up falling in love with him as well and fiercely tries to win his affection by constantly competing with Miyuki. She is intensely competitive, very strong willed, and stubborn.
Voiced by: Ai Orikasa (Japanese); Stacey Sperling (English)
Captain.Mitsuru Konishi (小西 充, Konishi Mitsuru)
The captain of the 801st and school rival with Kengamine Kouji. Konishi is an easy going, larger than life man who speaks in very high tones and is almost never seen without his sunglasses. Konishi is very supportive of his team members and works very hard to keep their squad safe from disbandment. When he was younger, Konishi won a ramen-eating contest and was schoolmates with Kouji. Before becoming captain, Konishi was secretly in love with Saginomiya Sakura, however so was his best friend, Toshimitsu Tokaji, and Sakura was in love with Tokaji. Konishi even proposed to Sakura on the day of her flight exam, but she thought it was Tokaji and said his name which forced Konishi to say Tokaji was in fact, the "real" person giving her the ring. He is unaware that she secretly returns his affections.
He is an avid weightlifter, bodybuilder, and athlete, leading the team on long runs, much to their dismay.
Voiced by: Norio Wakamoto (Japanese); David Arnsberger (English)
MSgt.Sakura Saginomiya (鷺ノ宮 さくら, Saginomiya Sakura)
Sakura is second in command of the team; she picks up Isurugi to drop him off at the 801st HQ in the beginning of the first episode. She has an aged dog named Patriot (who she loves very much) and is a compulsive gambler. Sakura gambles on virtually everything from flight exams, food contests, to horse racing; she also happens to be very good at it. Sakura loves karaoke, despite her teammates' unusual fear of her singing voice.
When Sakura was younger, she became known as one of the top up-and-coming female pilots and her skills are actually one of the causes for the 801st being formed, which caused tension amongst other female pilots who were jealous of her talent and her stealing the heart of Konishi's best friend, Tokaji. Both Tokaji and Konishi were in love with Sakura but she seemed only interested in Tokaji. On the day of her flight exam, Sakura had been promised by Tokaji he'd be there to see her exam but was distracted by three jealous girls. Konishi ran up to Sakura and proposed to her but she expected Tokaji and said his name, forcing Konishi to give her the ring in Tokaji's name. Sakura took the ring and wears it to this day, never knowing until years later Konishi was the one who proposed and though it is never clearly stated, it is implied she has strong feelings for Konishi and seemed to reveal she loved Konishi in return.
Voiced by: Kikuko Inoue (Japanese); Shawn Sides (English)
TSgt.Yoko Shimorenjaku (下連雀 ようこ, Shimorenjaku Yōko)
The sweet, short and pink-haired Yoko is used mainly as the comedic character in the series. She is very fond of sweets and junk food, gets rather nasty when she's drunk, and has a pet bat (Chi-chan) who bites people who are either scary or just new to him. Her bat serves as the team's mascot. Yoko is known for having an annoying high voice (in the dub anyway) and is prone to small fits of immaturity and child-like behavior. Yoko is the least experienced pilot and is nowhere near as good as Mitaka or Miyuki, as Kengamine Kouji once stated "Yoko is the kind of pilot who got her license out of a cereal box."
Voiced by: Yukana Nogami (Japanese); Maxine O (English)
Captain.Kouji Kengamine (剣ヶ峰 浩二, Kengamine Kōji)
The thieving, sneaky commander in charge of the 801st squadron. Kouji makes no secret of the fact he despises being in charge of the 801st; he constantly tries to think up new ways to disband the team or gain a promotion to escape. He thinks the idea of female pilots to be utterly ridiculous and always gets upset when the team continues to pass exams and tests. Kouji shares a rivalry with Mitsuru Konishi having known him from their training days in the academy. Despite his hatred for the 801st, Kouji defended them when the American flight team (the Thunderbirds) insulted the quality of Japanese pilots; Kouji is very proud to be a Japanese pilot.
Voiced by: Hideyuki Umezu (Japanese); Michael Dalmon (English)

== Production ==
The anime was produced with the collaboration of JSDF.

== Reception ==
Writing in the third edition of The Anime Encyclopedia (2015), Jonathan Clements and Helen McCarthy identified Airbats as a product of the Japanese fascination with military aviation following the success of Top Gun (1986), alongside the earlier and, in their opinion, more satirical Idol Defense Force Hummingbird. They compared its romantic comedy to that of Tenchi Muyo!, noting its similarly audience-pleasing premise of a male anime enthusiast surrounded by interested women. While praising the detailed depiction of aircraft, they criticized the portrayal of military personnel as eccentric and incompetent. They contrasted this approach with that of Patlabor, where similar absurdities enhanced the realism of the fictional world, whereas in Airbats they merely demonstrated the superficiality of its comedy.
