= Fan service =

Parts of a fictional work intended to please the audience

An illustration of Wikipe-tan depicted in a swimsuit, an example of sexual fan service

Fan service (ファンサービス, fan sābisu), fanservice, or service cut (サービスカット, sābisu katto) is material in a work of fiction or in a fictional series that is intentionally added to please the audience. Classically sexual in nature, fan service may depict fictional characters in revealing outfits, poses, or situations, occasionally involving partial or full nudity. The term originated in Japanese in the anime and manga fandom.

Today, especially outside anime and manga, the term has expanded to hold a wider meaning. This includes any elements, be it visual nods, referencing older or forgotten media related to material, shipping certain characters, plot detours or otherwise, that are not needed by the actual plot or character development, but are included as nods to, or pandering to the long-term fans of the material, especially in context of sequels or prequels, or later seasons of series.

== Types ==
=== Anime and manga ===
Keith Russell defines fan service as "the random and gratuitous display of a series of anticipated gestures common in Manga and Anime". The typical, but not only, variety of fan service in anime or manga is racy, sexual or erotic content, which may or may not include nudity or fetish content (for example, maid costumes). Fan service is especially common in shonen manga (aimed at boys). In shounen manga, pin-up girl style images are common "in varying states of undress", often using an "accidental exposure" excuse to show a favourite female character or an upskirt "glimpse of a character's panties". Jiggling breasts, known as the "Gainax bounce", are an example of fan service. The "bounce" was taken up by other animators, including the creators of the hentai series Cream Lemon. Shower scenes are very common in movies and in anime of the 1980s and 1990s, whereas many more recent TV series use trips to onsen (Japanese hot springs) or trips to tropical locales (or in some cases a swimming pool) in order to showcase the characters in bathing suits. Series aimed at males can also include fan service for women, as an attempt to court a wider audience.

Shōjo manga, aimed at female readers, also includes fan service, such as showing male characters "half-naked and in enticing poses". Robin Brenner notes that in the U.S. comics culture, fan service aimed at women is rare, and also that in Japan, series can be famous for their fan service content. Chris Beveridge explains this mindset with Agent Aika: "There's some sort of plot in there, but that's not the reason you're watching it. ... we're watching this for the sheer amount of fanservice". Male homoeroticism, such as accidental kisses, is a common feature of fan service for women and has been described as "easier to get away with" in terms of censorship than fan service for males. In the "Boys' Love" genre, fan service is "artwork or scenes" in products that "depict canonical characters in a homosocial/homoerotic context". Shōjo manga series may eroticise its female leads as well for crossover appeal, as fan service aimed at a potential male audience.

Robin Brenner notes that fan service can be offputting to some readers, as in a male reading shōjo manga or a female reading shōnen manga and that in general fan service is more criticised by some when it features a female character. She cites Tenjo Tenge as an example of a fan service–laden series. When the series was localised, a large amount of this fan service was removed, leading to outcry from fans.

=== Sport ===
Baseball teams provide events that are described in Japan as fan service, such as dance shows, singing the team song or a performance by the team mascot.

=== TV and film ===
In English-speaking contexts, especially in Western film and TV show franchises, the term "fan service" has expanded beyond its original, more sexualized meaning in anime and manga. It now often refers to moments added to primarily please or reward longtime fans rather than to serve the needs of the broader story. This can include the return of fan favourite characters, nostalgic references to earlier installments, callbacks to memorable lines, familiar music cues, or the reappearance of iconic elements from a franchise's past. Reception tends to hinge on execution: audiences and critics are generally more forgiving when a reference serves the story or pays off earlier setup, but view it more sceptically when a cameo or callback seems included only to generate excitement or promote the work.

This concept is frequently discussed in connection with major franchises such as the Marvel Cinematic Universe (MCU) and Star Wars, where returning characters, familiar imagery, and recognizable themes are often used to create a sense of nostalgia and connection with longtime audiences. However, some critics argue that repeated reliance on fan service can cause certain characters, references, or nostalgic elements to overstay their welcome, diminishing their impact over time.

== See also ==
- Fandom
- Otaku, a Japanese term broadly used to refer to fans of "any particular theme, topic, hobby or form of entertainment"
