= Katsuhiko Nishijima =

Japanese animator (born 1960)

- 西島克彦
- Born: February 4, 1960 (age 66); Funabashi, Japan
- Occupations: Animator, storyboard artist, director

Katsuhiko Nishijima (西島 克彦, Nishijima Katsuhiko; born February 4, 1960) is a Japanese animator, storyboard artist, and director known for panty-fanservice.

== Films ==
- Project A-ko (1986), director
- Project A-ko: Grey Side/Blue Side (1990), director
- Honō no Tenkōsei (1991), Director, Animation Director
- Megami Paradise (1995), director
- Sailor Victory (1995), director
- Agent Aika (1997), director, storyboard
- Labyrinth of Flames (2000), director, storyboard
- Najica Blitz Tactics (2001), director
- Office Lingerie (2003), director
- Kirameki Project (2005), director
- Aika R-16: Virgin Mission (2007), director, storyboard
- G-Taste (2010), director
- Nozoki Ana (2013), director
