= Agent Aika =

Japanese media franchise

- Cover of Agent Aika Trial 1
- Genre: Action; Post-apocalyptic
- Original video animation
- Directed by: Katsuhiko Nishijima
- Produced by: Kazuhiko Ikeguchi
- Written by: Katsuhiko Nishijima; Kenichi Kanemaki; Noriyasu Yamauchi
- Music by: Junichi Kanezaki
- Studio: Studio Fantasia
- Licensed by: NA: Central Park Media Bandai Entertainment
- Released: April 25, 1997 – April 25, 1999
- Runtime: 30 minutes
- Episodes: 7 + Special
- Manga

AIKa TRIAL 0
- Written by: Ayumi Konomichi
- Published by: Wani Books
- Magazine: Comic GUM
- Original run: 1998 – 1999
- Volumes: 1
- icon

Agent Aika (stylized and known simply as AIKa in Japan) is a Japanese OVA series animated by Studio Fantasia and directed by Katsuhiko Nishijima. The series follows Aika Sumeragi, a salvager for hire who gets caught up in a plot for world domination. The series was released in Japan from 1997 to 1999. The anime was initially licensed by Central Park Media, but was later licensed by Bandai Entertainment. The series is well known for its copious amounts of fan service, specifically the camera angles on panties of the many female characters who populate the show. On April 25, 2007, the first volume of the three-part prequel OVA AIKa R-16: Virgin Mission, detailing Aika's time when she was 16 years old, was released in Japan. A remastered version of the original series was released also, along with a special live-action edition of Agent Aika. In 2009, the sequel OVA AIKa ZERO with 19-year-old Aika was released.

== Plot ==
Following a catastrophic earthquake twenty years prior, Tokyo, along with most of the world, has sunk into the ocean during a large-scale land subsidence. Aika Sumeragi is a salvage agent, a person who digs up submerged artifacts from the cities below. She works for a small company run by Gozo Aida, and takes on fairly dangerous jobs. In the first story, she and Gozo's daughter Rion, search for material called the Lagu. However they are captured by Rudolf Hagen, an effeminate but over-sexed man who wants to use the Lagu to transform the world, destroying its inhabitants, and replacing them with an army of young women called the Delmo Corporation who will carry his progeny. Alongside Rudolf is his obsessive sister Neena Hagen, who is jealous of Aika when Rudolf desires to have Aika for himself. Aika has a special bustier that, when activated, transforms into a battle bikini that gives her extraordinary fighting powers. Following the defeat of the Hagens, the Delmo Corporation girls seek other methods to foil Aika in episodic stories.

== Characters ==
=== Protagonists ===
- Aika Sumeragi (皇 藍華, Sumeragi Aika)

Voiced by: Rei Sakuma (Japanese); Angora Deb (English)
The title character is a salvaging agent with blonde hair and typically a red business dress. The cover of the English video describes her as "sexy, suave, and sophisticated, but she's no bimbo. She's a martial arts expert and a jet fighter pilot with the body of a supermodel. She's Aika, and she's one of the best secret agents in the business." Her parents were scientists and made her a test subject of their experiments until the global earthquakes, after which she is looked after by Gozo Aida, who trains her in art of salvaging. She possesses a bustier made out of ultranate (オルタネートメタル), which transforms her into a dark-skinned and blue-haired woman with extraordinary strength and resilience.

- Rion Aida (相田 りおん, Aida Rion)

Voiced by: Hiroko Konishi (Japanese); Purva (English)
She is Aika's teenage glasses-wearing partner and the daughter of her boss. She hopes to continue in the family business. She admires Aika, and strives to seek for a big treasure.

- Gozo Aida (相田 郷造, Aida Gōzo)

Voiced by: Akio Ōtsuka (Japanese); Tristan Goddard (English)
Rion's father is the head of a small search and salvage operation called the K.K. Corporation (also known as K2). He was an active industrial spy, but rode on the chance of the catastrophic earthquake and entered the salvaging business. He prefers to hold onto the old ways of offering the best service for the cheapest price.

- Gusto Turbulence (ガスト・タービュランス, Gasuto Tābyuransu)

Voiced by: Jūrōta Kosugi (Japanese); Alvaro J. Gonzalez (English)
The son of a company president, he strives to be independent, working as a salvager. He likes Aika a lot and regularly asks her out only to be refused. However, he sometimes ends up in the right place to win the bounty from Aika.

- B.A. Bandora (バ・バンドラ)

Voiced by: Hisako Kyōda (Japanese); Mina Sands (English)
Gusto's partner is a veteran salvager who sports a pink mohawk, and handles the vehicles from tanks to harrier aircraft and spacecraft.

- Maypia Alexymetalia (メイピア・アルキメタリア, Meipia Arukimetaria)

Voiced by: Sakiko Tamagawa (Japanese); Rachael Lillis (Ep. 7) (English)
She is a "Class A" secret agent employed by the government to retrieve information on Lagu by infiltrating Hagen's army dressed as a Black Delmo. She even carries her own business cards. She runs into Rion, who ends up following her. After having been abandoned by her employers and her subsequent rescue by Aika and her friends, she went freelance. She reappears in the final episode, where she joins Rion and friends in their assault on the Delmo base. Maypia had red hair. Her iconic outfit is her Black Delmo uniform, which she wears a skintight black dress with white around the collar and a red ribbon, with white thigh-high socks, white panties and black high heels.

- Shuntaro Michikusa (道草 旬太郎, Michikusa Shuntaro)

Voiced by: Masaya Onosaka (Japanese); Jeffery Gimble (English)
Michikusa is introduced in the second story of the original series as a young salvager working under Gozo. Cute-looking but totally air-headed, he sometimes dresses in Delmo staff uniforms when available. He tries to cheer Rion up by role-playing a kappa doll with a squeaky voice, but this usually annoys her and earns him frequent beatings.

=== Antagonists ===
The Delmo Corps, also referred as the Delmogeny (デルモゲニィ, Derumogenii), is a group of pretty ladies headed by Rudolf Hagen who serve as his private army and to propagate his genetic material once he wipes out humanity from the Earth. Some of them work ordinary jobs like guides and waitresses, but they mainly act in espionage activities. Following Hagen's defeat in the first half of the series, the Delmogeny continue to function with the goals of capturing Aika and studying her special powers. They wear various colored uniforms from lowest-rank black to the highest-rank white, although, for the most part, they wear the same color white panties.

- Rudolf Hagen (ルドルフ・ハーゲン, Rudorufu Hāgen)

Voiced by: Kaneto Shiozawa (Japanese); Scott Cargle (English)
Hagen is the evil mastermind in the first story. He was contracted by the military to find the Lagu, but desires it for his own reasons. He believes that Lagu is something the Earth produced to destroy the humanity that polluted it. He plans to repopulate the Earth with his own progeny which includes his Delmo staff. It is later revealed that Hagen was born as a genetically altered test tube baby, in the process he received superior genes. Because of that he yearns for superior women to impart the genes to his next generation.

- Neena Hagen (ネーナ・ハーゲン, Nēna Hāgen)

Voiced by: Atsuko Tanaka (Japanese); Suzanne Savoy (English)
Rudolf's sister. She loves her big brother dearly and even sleeps in the nude with him, and dislikes Aika for "seducing" him. A sadistic character with an unstable mood, she walks around in her bare essentials and has the black Delmos punished for failure. She later receives from Rudolf an ultranate panty which allows her to transform to a powered-up form. However, when the device goes out of control, she degenerates into the shape of a blob. She then embraces and engulfs her brother as they are thrown into outer space.

- The Black Delmo (黒デルモ, Kuroderumo) are the infantry class who carry out simple missions. They include: an unnamed leader (Voiced by: Kumiko Nishihara) with short purple hair with curled ends; Kana (かな) (Voiced by: Wakana Yamazaki) who has pixie-cut black hair who drove Bianca's car in Operation Golden Apple; Misaki (みさき) (Voiced by: Kaori Tagami) who has short brunette hair; Yuki (ゆき) (Voiced by: Yumiko Suzuki), who has shoulder-length crimson hair; Sae (さえ) (Voiced by: Kanako Mitsuhashi), who has short dark blue hair.
- The White Delmo (ホワイトデルモ, Howaitoderumo) serve as the officers in the group. Its commander (Voiced by: Yuko Nagashima (Japanese); Mary Anne Towne (English)) is a beautiful green-haired woman. After Hagen's demise she takes over and seeks revenge on Aika and her entourage. However, after their defeat in the final episode of the original series, she tells the group to stay away from Aika so they can regroup and plan revenge for some future time. Others in the White Delmo include: an adjutant Voiced by: Akiko Hiramatsu (Japanese); Rachael Lillis (English) with short dark-blue hair who is the second-in-command and the commander's lover; Nina Esuko (ニナ エスコ) Voiced by: Akemi Okamura, who was in charge of the air base in Operation Silver Wild Grapevine.
- The Golden Delmo (ゴールデンデルモ, Gōruden derumo) serve on special operations. Its leader is Bianca (ビアンカ, Bianka), (Voiced by: Minami Takayama (Japanese); Wendy Talker (English)), who, in episode 5, tries to humiliate Aika by using a woman disguised as a man to toy with her feelings, and then to capture her alive. She uses a retractable sleeve-blade in melee combat and has a hidden flame thrower on her right arm. Ria Petoriyacowa (リエ・ペトリヤコワ, Rie Petoriyakowa) (Voiced by: Ikue Ohtani (Japanese); Tara Jayne (English)) is a young operative with long black hair in Operation Silver Wild Grapevine who tries to study Aika and how she fights. She pretends to be the conductor of the physical examination in episode 6, but after her disguise is foiled, she continues to gather Aika's fighting data by sending her underlings against her and then taping the entire battle. Other golden-clad girls mentioned by name include: Sania (サニア) Voiced by: Miki Nagasawa, who uses a grenade pistol; Tonia (トニア) (Voiced by: Kikuko Inoue), who uses clawed gauntlets.
- The Blue Delmo (青デルモ, Aoderumo) are the elite infantry class. They carry weapons such as the Sturmgewehr 45 assault rifle and perform duties such as piloting or defending the ship against intruders. Its leader (Voiced by: Yuri Shiratori) has short reddish-brown hair. Some of the characters named in the series include: Valarie (ヴァレリー, Varerī) (Voiced by: Shiho Niiyama (Japanese); P.M. Lewis (English)), who disguised herself as Pierre Valimore (ピエール・ヴァリモール, Piēru Varimōru), a pretty boy to seduce Aika in episode 5. Catherine (キャサリン, Kyasarin) (Voiced by: Wakana Yamazaki) appears twice in the series. When Hagen was ending to give directions, she was standing guard with her partner, but she is easily knocked out by the grid that falls on the head, which was kicked by Maypia, after an error of companions, Maypia and Rion end up falling on top of Catherine. Later she was taking care of Rion during her captivity in Rudolph's space ship. However, Rion easily defeated her and took her uniform. She has short wavy blonde hair.
- The Pink Delmo (ピンクデルモ, Pinkuderumo) serve as mechanics, engineers and heavy weapons operators aboard the ships and vehicles. Its leader is Suzie (スージ, Sūji) (Voiced by: Wakana Yamazaki), who has short brunette hair and appears in multiple episodes Others include: Vivian (ビビアン, Bibian) (Voiced by: Kanako Mitsuhashi), who also has short brunette hair; Liz (リズ, Rizu) (Voiced by: Yumiko Suzuki), who has shoulder-length olive hair; Betty (ベティ, Beti) (Voiced by: Junko Takeuchi), who has pixie-cut brunette hair.

== Production ==
The anime was directed by Katsuhiko Nishijima who had previously directed Project A-ko and would go on to direct Labyrinth of Flames.

Nishijima conceived the series as a reworking of his earlier Project A-ko, with Aika, Neena and Rion corresponding to A-Ko, B-Ko and C-Ko, respectively.

== Release ==
The first four episodes were released from April 25, 1997, to January 25, 1998. The opening theme for the first four episodes was "Silent City", performed by Mari Sasaki, and the closing theme was "More Natural" by Hiroko Konishi. Each episode is numbered as a Trial.

The next three episodes were released from August 25, 1998, to April 25, 1999. The animation was redone to include the new characters such as Michikusa. The opening theme was "Manatsu no Seiza" (真夏の星座) by Mink, and the closing theme was "Dance with Me Tonight" by Punky Fruites.

=== Episode list ===
| No. | Title | Original release date |
|---|---|---|
| 1 | "Beautiful Agent" (Japanese: 美しきエージェント) | April 25, 1997 |
| 2 | "Naked Mission" (Japanese: NAKED MISSION) | June 25, 1997 |
| 3 | "Takeoff Position" (Japanese: TAKE OFF POSITION) | September 25, 1997 |
| 4 | "A Flower Blooming in Space" (Japanese: 宇宙に咲く華) | January 25, 1998 |
| Special | "Special Trial" (Japanese: Special TRIAL) | May 25, 1998 |
| 5 | "The Golden Delmo Operation" (Japanese: 黄金のデルモ作戦) | August 25, 1998 |
| 6 | "Delmo Operation: White Silver" (Japanese: 白銀のデルモ作戦) | December 18, 1998 |
| 7 | "Break the Decisive Battle! Delmo Base!" (Japanese: 決戦突入！ デルモ基地!!) | April 25, 1999 |

== Reception ==
=== Manga ===
In reviewing the first volume, Chris Beveridge on Mania.com wrote that he had to put his brain in a certain mode, likening the experience to watching Dumb and Dumber where "Instead of idiot humor we're watching this for the sheer amount of fanservice." with its "four gajillion panty shots" and that it was a "great deal of mindless fun". He described Michikusa as "a waifish goofy ass boy who serves only one purpose: to be on screen and take time away from panty shots."

=== Anime ===
Stig Hogset of THEM Anime Reviews wrote that the show should have been a guilty pleasure but ends up being more of an overdose: "EVERY action scene seems to end up with unconscious females lying with their butts poking up into the air." He called the villains the creepiest he has ever seen, but recommended the show only to those with a panty or ass fetish. The Anime News Network reviewer wrote that "It's as if someone tried to make the most perverted anime they could without anyone actually being in any sexual situations. (Okay, so there are some.)", later adding that "The dub is weak and mistimed, and some of the minor characters just plain can't act." and recommended that the viewer watch titles from the company's Anime 18 productions instead. Todd Douglass Jr. of DVD Talk likened Aika's transformation to that in Cutie Honey and called the series the "epitome of guilty pleasure anime". He found the show to be solid-looking with fantastic animation and character design. With regards to the audio, he thought the Japanese cast did a much better job with the material than the English cast, writing that the latter was "particularly bland and it didn't maintain the necessary spark for this kind of show."

Writing in the third edition of The Anime Encyclopedia (2015), Jonathan Clements and Helen McCarthy described Agent Aika as "the ultimate in fan-service anime", criticizing its excessive reliance on revealing camera angles and gratuitous nudity, which they considered detrimental to the narrative. They compared the series to the same production team's later Najica Blitz Tactics and identified similarities to Daphne in the Brilliant Blue (2004).

Several reviewers for TokyoPop magazine gave it mixed reviews.

== See also ==
- Megami Paradise - Noriyasu Yamauchi previously anime artworks.
- Najica Blitz Tactics - next Noriyasu Yamauchi artworks anime as successor of Agent Aika series.
