= The Son of the Sun =

1987 Uncle Scrooge comic book story by Don Rosa

- Gladstone Publishing's US cover for Son of the Sun
- Story code: AR 102
- Story: Don Rosa
- Ink: Don Rosa
- Hero: Scrooge McDuck
- Pages: 26
- Layout: 4 rows per page
- Appearances: Scrooge McDuck; Donald Duck; Huey, Dewey and Louie; Flintheart Glomgold
- First publication: Uncle Scrooge #219; April 7th, 1987

"The Son of the Sun" is the first Scrooge McDuck comic by Don Rosa, first published in Uncle Scrooge #219 in July 1987. It is a well-known comic book story that features Disney's Scrooge McDuck, Donald Duck, and his three nephews, and an indirect sequel to "Lost in the Andes!" by Carl Barks. This story is most notable for establishing Don Rosa as a major talent in the Disney comic book industry, as well as fulfilling Rosa's childhood dream of becoming a writer/illustrator of stories featuring Scrooge McDuck.

The combination of homages to Barks, clever and intelligent writing, appealing art, and dependence of the resolution of the plot on one of Scrooge's most redeeming character traits were instrumental in the reception of this storyline as a modern classic.

== Background ==
Don Rosa had idolized Barks, the best-loved writer and illustrator of Scrooge McDuck comic books, since childhood, and had drawn several comics with strong stylistic influences from Barks' work during his early career. One such story, appearing in a series called the Pertwillaby Papers, was called "Lost In (an alternative section of) the Andes", and was in no small part an homage to a Barks story called (perhaps not surprisingly) Lost in the Andes!.

When Rosa began working with Gladstone Publishing, a publisher of Disney comics, he asked for and was granted permission to draw a Scrooge McDuck story. Rosa updated the plot for Lost In (an alternative section of) the Andes to feature Scrooge and his nephews instead of the original protagonist, and this story became Son of the Sun. He has since stated that the original conception of the story in his mind had always featured the Disney ducks, and that Son of the Sun is simply a return to the original conception.

The story met with widespread acclaim and was nominated for a Harvey Award, and immediately established Rosa as a major talent in writing and illustrating Scrooge McDuck.

== Plot ==
The opening panels of the story are set in the Duckburg museum, where Scrooge McDuck is opening a museum exhibit featuring the greatest wonders he has collected during his travels around the world (most of them direct tributes to classic Barks stories).

As Scrooge is bragging to his nephews (who are all familiar with the artifacts, having taken part in the expeditions for them), Flintheart Glomgold, who is about to open his own exhibit, overhears Scrooge and the conversation between the two rivals turns into a bragging match as to who is the greatest adventurer and treasure-seeker. Scrooge challenges Glomgold to think of something he couldn't find; Glomgold is momentarily nonplussed, then catches sight of Scrooge's exhibit of Inca artifacts and points out that while Scrooge found the original gold mines of the Incas, he never found the golden artifacts that had been extracted from the mines. Soon, Scrooge and his nephews are off on a race with Glomgold to see who can find, and claim the "greater Incan treasure".

The first clue comes as soon as Glomgold has left, as Donald picks up an Incan vase that was knocked over during the bragging match. They find a metal plaque baked inside, providing a map to a temple of Manco Capac in the Andes mountains. Unfortunately, Glomgold is eavesdropping on them.

Arriving at a village near Cuzco, Scrooge hires a plane to fly them to its location. The pilot of the plane turns out to be Glomgold, who relieves them of the plaque at gunpoint and then parachutes out. Scrooge tries to regain control of the plane and, in a comic episode, inadvertently rips out the belly of the plane while flying too low, dumping his nephews onto the valley floor, still in their seats. As the plane flies off, Glomgold approaches and informs the ducks that Scrooge has frightened away the porters he hired, so they will have to do.

A week later, Glomgold and his reluctant helpers reach a remote mountain, on the summit of which is the temple built around a large volcanic fumarole (hence, the plaque's description, the "life breath" of Manco Capac). Glomgold enters the temple's treasure chamber and is beside himself with glee to discover an enormous store of golden Inca artifacts. Then Scrooge appears, calmly informing Glomgold that he crash-landed the plane on the mountain top several days ago, and has already filed his claim on the gold using the plane's radio.

It seems that Scrooge has won, but Huey, Dewey, and Louie are confused about one thing: the plaque makes reference to an Incan "treasure" being moved to the temple, but it actually predates the time of the conquistadors, which is naturally when the gold would have been moved there. Realizing there must be another Incan treasure in the temple, Glomgold investigates further and discovers the "Eye" of Manco Capac: an enormous, disc-shaped sunburst festooned with enormous gemstones. Since Scrooge claimed the gold, and not the temple, and there's no gold on the sunburst, this makes it Glomgold's property.

As Scrooge and Glomgold begin to argue about whose treasure is of greater value, Glomgold begins taking the sunburst down from its wall mounting, but it falls and rolls down the temple steps and into the fumarole. It wedges into the hole convex side down, creating a perfect seal. As the volcanic gases build up an enormous pressure, Scrooge notices that the back of the sunburst is sheathed in gold, starting another furious argument between him and Glomgold, before causing them to wedge the sunburst down even more firmly. Before the others can stop them, the pressure mounts and the entire mountaintop, temple and all, is suddenly blown into the sky like a cork from a bottle. The ducks are able to use a tapestry as a makeshift parachute before the temple lands squarely in a nearly bottomless volcanic lake, next to the village they originally started from. The massive splash of water irrigates the villagers’ crop fields, relieving them from the effects of recent drought.

All of the treasure is now completely irretrievable. As the dispirited ducks begin their journey back to civilization, Scrooge is seen emerging from the village and mentions that he has agreed to build a pumping station for the village so that they will never be troubled by drought again. Glomgold scorns Scrooge's generosity, until Scrooge reveals that in return, the villagers have agreed to sell him the lake for one peso—which makes Scrooge the rightful owner of both the temple and all of the treasure inside it. Even though he cannot retrieve it, Scrooge is now the clear legal owner of all of the treasure—and thus the winner of the contest.

== Relation to Barks's works ==
The story is notable for its clear homage to many Barks stories, featuring a search for lost treasure, a set of improbable clues that must be deciphered in order to retrieve it, and a series of unpredictable twists and turns en route to the retrieval of said treasure, all classic elements of Barks' Scrooge McDuck stories.

The portrayal of Scrooge is a deliberate contrast to Glomgold's evil and sneakiness: Scrooge is both shrewd and generous, finding ways to make a profit that do plenty of good to local communities. The fact that his generosity allows him to triumph over Glomgold in this story shows the qualities that elevate Scrooge to a hero instead of just a rich eccentric.

=== Visual cues ===
The museum exhibit contains a line of mementos from classic Barks adventures featuring Scrooge:

- A 1916 quarter (from "The Secret of Atlantis”)
- The Crown of Genghis Khan (from "The Lost Crown of Genghis Khan!")
- The Golden Fleece (from "The Golden Fleecing")
- A collection of Inca artifacts (from "The Prize of Pizarro")
- The Philosopher's stone (from "The Fabulous Philosopher's Stone")
- The Candy Striped Ruby (from "The Status Seeker")

=== Story cues ===
- In the museum, Donald says he is tired of Scrooge and Glomgold's repeated contests to see which of them is the richest duck in the world ("The Second-Richest Duck"; "The Money Champ"); Glomgold blithely says that, regardless of what those contests might say, he has always been the champion. However, this story marks a new direction in the Scrooge-Glomgold rivalry, in which they make bets over hunting treasure rather than comparing their wealth.
- The old South American man who advises both Scrooge and Glomgold originally appeared in Barks's story "Lost in the Andes", along with his signature line, "These Americanos are crazy!" — perhaps a play on the famous "Those Romans are crazy!" tagline by the French cartoon character Obelix of Asterix comics, by René Goscinny and Albert Uderzo.
- A hidden reference is made to the theory of Norwegian ethnographer and adventurer Thor Heyerdahl and his Kon-Tiki expedition: The lake Titicaca, central in the story of "The Son of the Sun", is the lake where Heyerdahl (inspired by local folklore) assumed that the indigenous peoples of the Americas traveled on balsa rafts westwards from the Americas to form the origin of the population of Polynesia. When Glomgold and Scrooge uncovers the treasure called "the eye of Manco Capac" in "The Son of the Sun" they find it lined with black pearls from Polynesia. This is actually in contradiction to Heyerdahl's theory since it would require migration to have taken place in the opposite direction, i.e. from Polynesia to the Americas.

== References in later Rosa works ==
- In Rosa's story Return to Plain Awful, a sequel to Barks's Lost in the Andes, Scrooge and his nephews travel to South America to find chickens that lay square eggs. Many unscrupulous business tycoons are eager to follow Scrooge, but Scrooge evades them all, except for Glomgold, who recalls "all too painfully" the pumping station that Scrooge built on the shore of Lake Titicaca, and realizes it is Scrooge's likely destination. The elderly South American gentleman also reappears, and repeats his signature line, "These Americanos are crazy!"
- In Rosa's story The Last Lord of Eldorado, Scrooge and Glomgold are competing to find the lost city of El Dorado, in Colombia. During this competition, Scrooge needles Glomgold several times over Glomgold's loss during their previous contest in South America.

== Editions ==
- "The Son of the Sun" served as the title story to Fantagraphics Uncle Scrooge and Donald Duck: The Don Rosa Library Vol. 1
