= DuckTales: The Quest for Gold =

1990 video game

- Developer: Incredible Technologies
- Publishers: NA: Walt Disney Computer Software; EU: Titus France
- Director: Bill Zielinski
- Producer: David Mullich
- Artist: Denise Wallner
- Composers: Kyle Johnson; David Thiel
- Series: DuckTales
- Platforms: Amiga, Atari ST, Commodore 64, MS-DOS
- Release: 1990
- Genre: Platform
- Mode: Single-player

DuckTales: The Quest for Gold is a platform game developed by Incredible Technologies for the Amiga, Commodore 64, Atari ST and MS-DOS. It was published in 1990 by Walt Disney Computer Software. The game bears little resemblance to the Capcom game known simply as DuckTales that was released for the NES and Game Boy.

== Gameplay ==
The game starts as Flintheart Glomgold walks into Scrooge McDuck's office and challenges him to see who is the richest duck in the world. Assuming the role of Scrooge, the player then gets 30 days to collect treasures from all around the world. Scrooge is assisted by his grandnephews Huey, Dewey, and Louie and pilot Launchpad McQuack. Flying to different destinations is one of the many different sequences in the game. Many of these destinations are fictitious or imaginative, names often being puns on real locations, and some were featured in episodes of the show. Some exist in the real world, such as the Carlsbad Caverns.

In flying sequences to reach the destination, the Beagle Boys try to hinder the player by methods such as dropping pianos. If the plane crashes, the player will lose money as well a couple of days while Gyro Gearloose repairs the plane.

Alternatively the player may also find the rare mineral Bombastium, which Gyro can use to create a matter transfer unit. This eliminates the need to travel by plane, and therefore the risk of crashing and losing time and money; the downside is that the matter transfer unit malfunctions sometimes and sends the player to the wrong destination.

Upon reaching a destination, the player has to play through a certain scenario to reach the treasure. The four different scenarios are divided equally among the many destinations, and are typical for the environment. Some of these scenarios, namely the mountain and the jungle, are platform-based levels where the player plays as Huey (later Dewey and Louie if the player fails the first attempt). Other level types include the cave, which is a labyrinth the player must navigate through, and the wildlife reservation which features Webby Vanderquack taking pictures of animals. The pictures, especially ones with rare animals such as pink elephants, bring rewards for the player similar to the treasure chest in the other levels. Photography levels are rather easy to play, seeing as there are no real obstacles.

The Beagle Boys also appear in mountain levels together with falling boulders, mountain goats, bears and even Magica De Spell. In the horizontal jungle levels, the player must overcome toucans, panthers and coconut-throwing monkeys. Hippopotami which swim in the water below the player may be useful for transportation, but they are slightly unpredictable since they might duck underwater at any moment, causing the player to fall in the water. Peculiarly, Huey, Dewey and Louie cannot swim. When playing in the cave, the player must maneuver on a map which looks slightly like a Chinese chess board. Around in the cave lurks a mummy which the player must avoid in addition to shafts. Due to the somewhat higher difficulty of cave levels, the treasure chests usually bring quite high rewards.

Two other ways of getting money exist, should the player not want to travel the globe for treasures. One way features Scrooge diving in his money vault, on occasions finding a rare coin worth $1000. In addition, it is possible to play the stock market. From time to time, Scrooge's rival Glomgold takes some of the treasures.

When 30 days have passed, the game is over and the duck who has gained the most money wins.

Many of the locations and treasures featured in the game have been taken directly from specific episodes of the television show. Examples include the locales of Montedumas and Swansylvania, which originate from the episodes "Duck in the Iron Mask" and "Ducky Horror Picture Show", respectively. Examples of treasures include Drakesphere's lost play from the episode "Much Ado About Scrooge" and the pearl of wisdom from the episode of the same name.

== Release ==
The Amiga and MS-DOS versions use a password system for copy protection. When the game is booted up, the players must use a key in the manual to translate symbols on the screen.

Ports for the ZX Spectrum and Apple II were promoted, but not released.

== See also ==
- List of Disney video games
