= His Majesty, McDuck =

- Uncle Scrooge Adventures's cover His Majesty, McDuck by Don Rosa from 1989.
- Story code: AR 145
- Story: Don Rosa
- Ink: Don Rosa
- Hero: Scrooge McDuck
- Pages: 28
- Layout: 4 rows per page
- Appearances: Scrooge McDuck; Donald Duck; Huey, Dewey and Louie; The Beagle Boys; Cornelius Coot; Emily Quackfaster (cameo); Clerkly (cameo)
- First publication: Uncle Scrooge Adventures #14, August 1989

"His Majesty, McDuck" is a Donald Duck story by Don Rosa, first published in Uncle Scrooge Adventures #14 in August 1989.

Despite thematic similarities, this story is not to be confused with the Carl Barks story King Scrooge the First.

== Plot ==
Scrooge McDuck accidentally finds a brass plaque on the site of his Money Bin. The plaque was originally made by Sir Francis Drake, who claimed the entire hill as property of the Queen of England back in 1579. Later, in the early 19th century, the English built a fort there. However, a war with Spain caused England to abandon the fort, giving it away to the nearest non-English person found, who just happened to be Cornelius Coot. Coot, the sole person present at the fort, drove the Spanish away with a clever plot, and continued to maintain the fort. Later, of course, Scrooge's Money Bin was erected in its place.

Scrooge finds out that the hill his Money Bin stands on was never actually part of the United States of America, so he jumps at the chance to claim sovereignty and collect tax refunds from Duckburg. To retaliate, Duckburg imposes strict restrictions on inter-country travel, with Scrooge's own employees having to show their passports just to come to work. A crafty villain shows up with the Beagle Boys, attempting to conquer Scrooge's own private country, initially succeeding, but Scrooge eventually fends him off.

Finally, the mayor of Duckburg tells Scrooge that his tax refunds would be so large that they would bankrupt the entire city. Scrooge does not seem to care, but he "accidentally" destroys the deed that Coot signed, and irritably informs his nephews that he melted down Drake's plaque to make his crown, with materials being expensive. In the end, it turns out that this was no accident. Scrooge still has the plaque, but chooses to keep it secret, indicating that he destroyed the grant on purpose, from the good of his heart: He could not bring himself to bankrupt Duckburg, yet had to save face before his nephews who must not think of him as "soft."

== Cultural references ==
- The panel in which Cornelius Coot's journal is removed from a vault in the Coot Library for reading is a direct homage to a scene from Citizen Kane.
- Don Rosa has stated he got the plot from Passport to Pimlico.
- McDuck regains his throne and country from the usurper by defeating him in a sword duel. When the villain turns away to flee, McDuck uses the sword to carve a dollar sign behind his pants. This is a reference to Zorro, a hero who often carves a Z with his rapier as a calling card.

== See also ==
- Drake's Plate of Brass
