= The Money Champ =

- Story code: W US 27-01
- Story: Carl Barks
- Ink: Carl Barks
- Date: July 12, 1958
- Hero: Scrooge McDuck
- Pages: 22
- Layout: 4 rows per page
- Appearances: Scrooge McDuck; Donald Duck; Huey, Dewey, and Louie; Flintheart Glomgold

"The Money Champ" was originally published in Uncle Scrooge #27 in September, 1959 and is the second of three stories written and drawn by Carl Barks in which Scrooge's rival Flintheart Glomgold appears. Glomgold first appeared in "The Second-Richest Duck" in Uncle Scrooge #15 (Sept 1956).

== Plot ==
Scrooge McDuck walks around Duckburg enjoying the admiration of the Duckburgians for being the Money Champion of the world until a stranger shows up and hits him with a glove. After being told it means a challenge, Scrooge starts fighting his challenger until the police takes both of them under arrest.

In a courtroom, the challenger explains that the challenge is about counting their cash to decide who's the real money champ. Scrooge thinks the challenger must be crazy until he says he almost defeated Scrooge in Africa and he came here to finish the job. Scrooge then remembers who the challenger really is: Flintheart Glomgold. Donald Duck and his nephews, Huey, Dewey, and Louie, then recalls how Scrooge won that time.

Scrooge and Flintheart start bragging about how wealthier they got since the last confrontation and lose temper, causing the judge to give each of them a five-gold-mine fine. After that, Scrooge allows Flintheart to visit The Money Bin hoping it would make the challenger give up. Flintheart claims to have more valuable things on his bin and the challenge continues: Scrooge and Flintheart must liquidate most of they can of their fortunes and whoever gets the biggest pile of silver dollars is the real money champ.

Scrooge tries to sell the oil wells he bought last month only to learn that the seller, "Goldflint Heartglom', tricked them with oil he poured there to make the land look like it was more valuable than it really is. He later tries to sell some gold mines only to learn there's no gold in there, just gold-painted rocks, left there by 'Flintgold Glomheart", who sold the mines to Scrooge. Scrooge then visits one of his diamond mines trying to sell it but a phony inspector called "Heartflint Goldglom" opened a dam, sabotaging the mine.

Back to Duckburg, Flintheart arranged it so they could place their money piles in the airport's abandoned landing gear. Things aren't good for Scrooge as his pile seemed to be half as big as Flintheart's. People were now hissing at Scrooge and hailing Flintheart as the new champ. Flintheart and Scrooge discuss and Glomgold says if the has-been, as he now calls Scrooge, wins he'll eat Scrooge's top hat. Scrooge says Flintheart will have to furnish the salt all by himself.

Suspicious, Scrooge investigates and learns Flintheart's money pile is right above a sewer hole. Meanwhile, Huey, Dewey, and Louie learn that Flintheart's pile keeps growing without anyone putting money on it. Scrooge and Donald go down the sewers and discover that Flintheart is inflating a giant balloon within his pile. When both Scrooge and Flintheart have finished their piles, Scrooge uses a big spear to blow up Flintheart's balloon, ending the hoax. Scrooge now demands Glomgold to make an honest pile so Scrooge can win a fair fight. Days later, Flintheart finishes his pile, which seems to be nearly as big as Scrooge's.

A mysterious sorcerer, seeing how desperate the two ducks are, shows up and tries to sell Scrooge a shrinking potion to use on Flintheart's pile of money, but Scrooge refuses, saying he'll win honestly or won't win at all. Flintheart is thinking about his mother, whose hopes he betrayed when he became dishonest when the sorcerer shows up trying to sell him the potion. Flintheart agrees to buy five gallons of the potion for five gallons of coins. Flintheart then gets the potion in a sack made of crocodile skin, the only thing besides duck skin that the potion doesn't affect and is also given a crocodile skin squeeze bottles to handle the potion out of the sack.

Flintheart starts heading to Scrooge's pile, when Scrooge shows up with a court order against it but Glomgold shrinks it. Donald tries to use a truck as an obstacle for Glomgold, but the rival shrinks it. Donald says he never saw anything missing so fast since he missed a payment on a TV. Huey, Dewey, and Louie use judo to stop Flinty and throw him back to his own pile. Glomgold then tried to throw the squeeze bottles and break them on Scrooge's pile, but Huey, Dewey, and Louie stopped them with homing rockets. Flintheart then decides to rent a cannon and shoot the sack of potion on Scrooge's pile. Scrooge then uses his scatter gun on the potion, causing it to leak on the cannon, shrinking it. The remaining potion hits Scrooge's top hat.

The piles are finally measured and the surveyors say that Flintheart's pile is 1,100 cubic inches (18 litres) smaller than Scrooge's. They also say it's almost exactly five gallons. Despite this, Flintheart gains a moral victory: because Scrooge's hat was hit by the potion, it is small enough to be eaten in one bite.

== Reception ==
Thad Komorowski notes that while Barks rarely made direct reference to previous stories, he specifically set up this story as a rematch following the events "The Second-Richest Duck". He writes, "While the original challenge in "Second-Richest Duck" was less about skullduggery and more about two old coots facing the elements, Glomgold has now developed a truly vindictive streak. He hates Scrooge and wants to see him defeated, suffering, humiliated, and outclassed. Even if Scrooge refused to participate in this ruse, Glomgold still has the satisfaction of scamming Scrooge out of a couple of fortunes by posing as three different aliases weeks prior to this money champ challenge."

== See also ==
- List of Disney comics by Carl Barks
