= Oolated Luck =

Donald Duck comic story

- Story code: AR 110
- Story: Don Rosa
- Ink: Don Rosa
- Hero: Donald Duck
- Pages: 10
- Layout: 4 rows per page
- Appearances: Donald Duck; Gladstone Gander; Huey, Dewey and Louie; Scrooge McDuck
- First publication: Walt Disney's Comics and Stories #528; April, 1988

"Oolated Luck" is a comic story about the rivalry between Donald Duck and Gladstone Gander, first published in Walt Disney's Comics and Stories #528 in April 1988. It was written and drawn by Don Rosa, based on a small item appearing in an earlier story by Carl Barks. The story is reprinted in volume 1 of The Don Rosa Library, The Son of the Sun.

== Plot ==
The story starts off with Donald and his nephews reading an ad about the Oolated Squigg company and its second annual contest. The first prize is a south seas cruise on an ocean liner, which Donald wants to win. It will be difficult, since Donald Duck's extremely lucky cousin Gladstone Gander also wants the prize.

The rules say there is no limit for the number of entries each contestant may submit, so Donald intends to pick all entry forms to make sure Gladstone and his luck won't stop him. Picking the entries won't be as easy as it's originally thought. The company decided to send the 10,000 entry forms inside squigg-shaped balloons through Duckburg.

Still determined to get all the raffle tickets within the balloons, Donald tries to grab them as soon they are released. Unfortunately, it causes Donald to float away with the balloons. The nephews point out a balloon floating near Gladstone, who doesn't want to make the effort of lifting his arm to get it, saying that either a bird will pop the balloon for him or it simply doesn't have the winning ticket.

Eventually, Donald seems to have caught all the balloons, which, as he points out, must have been placed together via a thermal inversion, meaning they must be floating above a place with a low temperature. The place happens to be the Money Bin. Scrooge McDuck, fearing the balloons could be another plot of the Beagle Boys trying to steal his money, shoots them down. As a multitude tries to get the entry forms, Scrooge, who doesn't know about the contest, tries to make the contestants who followed the balloons go away. When he hears about a contest, the idea of paying more taxes because of the prizes horrifies Scrooge where he agrees to give the balloons to the first person who claims them.

Donald, who was under all the balloons, claims them all for himself and heads for the Oolated Squigg company to claim his prize. As they arrive at the company, the contest organizers are shocked by the idea of one person having all the tickets, but Huey, Dewey, and Louie say there are only 9,999 of the 10,000 ballons. Donald doesn't like the way it sounds, specially with Gladstone in the vicinity. One of the organizers says that a single entry got stuck in the factory and never was released. Donald tries to get it before Gladstone, but trips and accidentally kicks the ticket right to Gladstone's hands.

Donald asks what Gladstone was doing there, since he had no entries, and he says the last year's winner gets to draw the winning ticket for this one. Hearing this, Huey, Dewey, and Louie figure a way to make Gladstone's luck work against him. They submit only one ticket in the name of Donald. All others are for Gladstone. While Gladstone is picking the winning ticket, the nephews comment about Gladstone's luck beating the odds. That's when Gladstone figures out their plan: They've put the odds for him and against Donald so Gladstone would be beaten by his own luck. The plan seems to work, as Donald wins the cruise and Gladstone gets a one-year supply of oolated squiggs as the second-placer.

While trying to enjoy his "prize", Gladstone thinks about the contest and comes to the conclusion that losing a contest is bad luck, regardless of whether the odds were for or against him. Then he reads an article in the newspaper about the cruise ship getting grounded on an iceberg, and he later finds a diamond ring eaten by a squigg. The story ends with Donald on the iceberg, having nothing to eat except squiggs recently fished from there.

== Publication ==
The story was published in the Don Rosa Library Vol. 1. and in Walt Disney Treasury: Donald Duck vol. 1.

== Reception ==
A mixed review wrote: "The whole story feels workmanlike in that it takes no chances, the artwork is serviceable, it has a number of solid jokes in it, and as such it fits the bill for a typical ‘good’ Disney comic. If that sounds like an indictment against Disney comics... well, there's a reason Rosa stood out, and it's because he usually didn't make comics like this."
