= A Little Something Special =

1997 Uncle Scrooge comic book story by Don Rosa

- Don Rosa's cover artwork for the story.
- Story code: D 96325
- Story: Don Rosa
- Ink: Don Rosa
- Date: October 1996
- Hero: Scrooge McDuck
- Pages: 28
- Layout: 4 rows per page
- Appearances: Scrooge McDuck; Donald Duck, Huey, Dewey and Louie, Gyro Gearloose, The Beagle Boys, Magica De Spell, Flintheart Glomgold, Daisy Duck, Gladstone Gander, Grandma Duck, Blackheart Beagle, Glittering Goldie
- First publication: December 1997

"A Little Something Special" is a 1997 Disney comics story created by Don Rosa to celebrate the 50th anniversary of Scrooge McDuck's first appearance in Carl Barks's "Christmas on Bear Mountain" in 1947.

The story was first published in the Danish Anders And & Co. #1997-26; the first American publication was in The Adventurous Uncle Scrooge McDuck #2, in March 1998.

== Development ==
Don Rosa was asked by the editors at Egmont to write the "official" Scrooge McDuck 50th anniversary story, a responsibility that he took very seriously. One problem that he faced was how to write a story set in the contemporary Duck universe about Scrooge's "50th birthday", since the character is clearly older than 50. This was solved by writing the story about the 50th anniversary of Scrooge's arrival in Duckburg. Rosa's Duck stories all take place sometime in the 1950s (the era when Carl Barks created the characters), and it was established in Rosa's The Life and Times of Scrooge McDuck that Scrooge came to Duckburg in 1902, so the anniversary story could be set in 1952.

Rosa wanted to include all of Barks' heroes and villains in the story, giving each character at least one moment when they contribute meaningfully to the plot. The Beagle Boys, Magica De Spell, and Flintheart Glomgold are the villains driving the action, but there are also moments for Gyro Gearloose (who invents the bike saucer), Gladstone Gander (whose famous luck assists the police at a critical moment), and Grandma Duck (who leads the characters to find Scrooge at the site of her father's old general store).

In his commentary on the story in the 2017 collection The Don Rosa Library, vol. 7, Rosa said, "In many ways, this may well be my favorite story of my own works!"

== Plot ==
Scrooge is informed that next week, Duckburg is celebrating the 50th anniversary of when he first arrived there, and he wonders why anyone would care when he arrived. Donald Duck then tells him that the Golden Jubilee celebration includes a contest to find the best suggestion for the perfect gift for Scrooge for a million dollar prize. Scrooge is not at all keen on the idea, and refuses to admit to either Donald or his grandnephews what his desire would be.

Meanwhile, the Beagle Boys visit Gyro Gearloose, claiming to have reformed, and offer to pay him in building a giant suction device that they claim will be used for harvesting oranges. In addition to this, they buy a bike-saucer using money supplied in bags bearing the initials "F.G." (which they say is a federal grant). Later, Magica De Spell uses money from the same supplier (Magica claims she got it from her Fairy Godmother) to purchase a projecto-gem, transmutation wand, and some global-transport dust. She then uses the last of these items in teleporting herself to a meeting with the Beagle Boys and their financial supplier, Flintheart Glomgold; they have all teamed up to take down Scrooge at the celebration and achieve their own goals.

At the day of the Golden Jubilee, Scrooge reluctantly takes part, leaving Donald in charge of guarding the Money Bin. Soon, Donald gets a visit from the Beagle Boys disguised as his family members and grows suspicious about them. Down at the festival, Huey notices that the host is actually Glomgold in disguise (by looking at his shadow) and tells this to Scrooge, who realizes that Magica is in league with him. He and the boys rush back to the Bin, where they collide with Magica. Their arrival interrupts her magic and breaks the transmutation, which wears off the Beagles Boys' disguises. One of the Beagles then steals a security grid key from Miss Quackfaster, allowing them to use the invention they had Gyro build to tear open the Money Bin and suck out all of Scrooge's money. Immediately following this, the villains all escape into the suction machine themselves, with Scrooge following behind.

Down below, Scrooge finds himself in the remains of the original Duckburg, which has since gone underground when the city's new construction went above the original street level. He soon finds the villains celebrating their success in Coot's Emporium, along with the mastermind behind this scheme, Blackheart Beagle. Scrooge breaks in and figures out that Blackheart is planning to transport the money out through the abandoned subway tunnels. Blackheart says he's going to make sure nobody bothers to follow them by blowing up Duckburg. The Beagles continue loading the cash onto their train and leave Magica to guard Scrooge. Scrooge finds some old telephone lines he had installed 47 years ago, and starts kicking at them in morse code. Back up above at the festival site, Donald rallies the citizens into helping find and rescue Scrooge. Later, when the nephews try to call Junior Woodchuck Headquarters, they pick up Scrooge's morse code message and translate it. Recognizing Coot's Emporium as her father's general store, Grandma Duck leads them there.

Back underground, Magica gloats to Scrooge that she now has the Number One Dime, but Scrooge tells her the plan is flawed now that he no longer is rich and offers a suggestion in return for his dime. Soon after, as Blackheart starts gloating to Scrooge himself, Donald and the nephews ambush him, allowing Scrooge to switch tracks so that the train plunges off a weak track down into the sewers. Blackheart flees, escaping on the bike saucer that his grandsons bought from Gyro.

Leaving Donald and the boys behind to disarm Blackheart's explosives, Scrooge snags onto Blackheart's escape vehicle, causing him to crash into the statue of Cornelius Coot. Blackheart finally pushes the button on his detonator, but by this time, Donald has disarmed the bombs, rendering them useless. Blackheart then attempts to escape on his bike saucer, swearing that he'll return, but Gladstone Gander manages to help by asking the police to put a reward on Blackheart's head. Just then, a lucky wind then comes from Gladstone and throws Blackheart off course, getting him snagged in a banner and dropping him at the feet of the police. Elsewhere, the other villains climb out of the sewers. Magica then transports herself and the Beagle Boys to the Valley of the Limpopo, where they get to work robbing Glomgold's Money Bin, much to Glomgold's dismay.

A few days later, just as things are returning to normal in Duckburg, Scrooge gets a surprise visit from Glittering Goldie, which Donald and the others had planned for before the contest was even announced. Goldie says she was brought here to give Scrooge "a little something... special" and then promptly gives him a kiss, which he initially doesn't seem to like. As soon as she leaves, though, Scrooge sighs happily to himself, for seeing her again was what he really desired the whole time.

== Scrooge and Goldie ==
In a 1996 interview conducted over email, Rosa said that he would never write a story that involved Scrooge and Goldie meeting again:

$crooge and Goldie have only met three times. Once in Barks' "Back to the Klondike" flashback, where she steals his poke and he kidnaps her for a month into the gold fields, the second time in that same story in the present, and the third time in my "Last Sled to Dawson" a few years later. In "King of the Klondike" they never meet, even though they yell at each other from distances a few times (since I fully intend that Barks' story tells of their first meeting), and in my "Hearts of the Yukon" they are never both conscious at the same time during the climax of the story. This is my intention. I NEVER want a story where they have any further contact; That would ruin the magnitude of the three times they did meet. 1- when they were lovers in 1898; 2- when $crooge realized he still loved her in the present in "Back to the Klondike"; and 3- when she finds out in "Last Sled..." that $crooge intended to propose marriage in 1899, but never made it. Any further meetings will spoil it all. I don't know about other writers, but I will NEVER allow them to meet again.

"A Little Something Special" was published in 1997, about a year after that interview.
