= Flintheart Glomgold =

Disney comics character

- Donald Duck character
- Flintheart Glomgold as he appears in the Scrooge McDuck comics
- First appearance: "The Second-Richest Duck" in Uncle Scrooge #15 (September 1956)
- Created by: Carl Barks
- Voiced by: Hal Smith (1987–1990); Brian George (2013); Keith Ferguson (2017–present)
- Alias: Duke Baloney (DuckTales reboot only)
- Relatives: Brickheart Glomgold (father); Mrs. Glomgold (mother); Stoneheart Glomgold (paternal grandfather); Willy-Bob (cousin); Slackjaw Snorehead (nephew); Junior (nephew)
- Nationality: South African; American (DuckTales)

Flintheart Glomgold is a cartoon character created in 1956 by Carl Barks. He is a South African American Pekin Duck and the business rival of Scrooge McDuck, usually portrayed as an ambitious, ruthless, and manipulative businessman who shares many of the same qualities as Scrooge—the drive for massive wealth and the cunning and creativity to obtain the same—but he lacks any of Scrooge's tendencies towards generosity and compassion. In Don Rosa's The Life and Times of Scrooge McDuck, he is said to be a Boer.

Glomgold is one of Scrooge's main rivals along with the Beagle Boys, Magica De Spell, and John D. Rockerduck, and also holds the title of being the "Second Richest Duck in the World" while Scrooge is the richest. His appearance is deliberately similar to that of Scrooge, but he is usually drawn with a full beard and sideburns as opposed to simple side-whiskers, black or purple frock coat instead of Scrooge's red or blue one, and a dark tam o'shanter instead of Scrooge's top hat.

== Comic history ==
=== Under Carl Barks ===
Glomgold was originally created in 1956 by Scrooge McDuck artist and creator Carl Barks, the creator of much of the Duck universe. Characterized as an unrepentant miser, tycoon, plutocrat, and general villain, he rarely sees any problem with breaking the law, cheating, or using other unfair tactics in order to fulfill his goal of becoming the world's richest duck. That makes him a "broken mirror" of Scrooge McDuck, whose own avarice is tempered with his belief in earning money strictly through honest means.

Flintheart Glomgold from Carl Barks' story "The Second-Richest Duck".

Glomgold first appeared in "The Second-Richest Duck", first published in September 1956. In this story, Scrooge, who holds the title of the Richest Duck in the World, learns that a businessman from the valley of the Limpopo, South Africa has also claimed this title. Scrooge decides to confront this claimant to his title and travels to South Africa along with his nephew Donald and three grandnephews. The rest of the story concentrates on comparing and contrasting the two rivals during a race through "The Heart of Africa" (a recurring phrase in the story), by seeing who has the largest ball of string, because they are shown equal in everything else, from cash to gold mines to even who has the most pumpkins. The race is supposed to determine which one of them deserves the title.

The two characters resemble each other both in appearance and behavior though their main common point seems to be that they are extremely competitive, and neither of them can accept the idea of someone else being equal or superior to them. Flintheart, like Scrooge, keeps a percentage of his fortune in his own Money Bin, identical to that of Scrooge (with the exception of the external logo: a dollar sign on McDuck's and a pound sign on Glomgold's), while the rest of his fortune is invested in a worldwide financial empire of his own that equals that of Scrooge, although Scrooge's main sources of wealth are his industries, while Flintheart's are his diamond mines.

However, the main difference between them seems to be their way of life. Scrooge's Money Bin is at the center of Duckburg, Calisota, United States, a constantly expanding industrial city, while Flintheart's is in the center of a valley, located somewhere in the lands around Limpopo, surrounded by wildlife and away from human activities. While Scrooge finds himself surrounded by an extended family (see Clan McDuck, Duck family, and Coot Kin) and a large number of allies and rivals (see Scrooge McDuck Universe), Flintheart lives a life of solitude and seems to have no family, friends, or for that matter rivals except Scrooge himself. While Scrooge has his nephews helping him or advising him, Flintheart faces every situation alone. This appears to have hardened him – he is considerably more ruthless than Scrooge – but also leaves him vulnerable to being simply outnumbered by his rivals. Even at the end of the story, when Scrooge has won and Flintheart passes out after finding he is only second best, he has to be carried home by Huey, Dewey, and Louie because he has no one else to help him.

The solitary South African re-appeared to challenge Scrooge to a rematch in The Money Champ, first published in September 1959. This time the confrontation takes place in Scrooge's grounds in Duckburg with the city's population witnessing the event, and they only count their wealth in cash and not their investments, so they have to liquidate much of their fortunes. Flintheart uses a number of underhand plots against Scrooge, but his plans backfire when their cost in money also costs Flintheart his chance at victory. The story adds little to what was established in the previous one. However, for the first time, some panels concentrate on Flintheart's thoughts, revealing that his insecurities about his own worth are the driving force behind both his efforts to best Scrooge and his dishonest tactics (since he doubts his ability to win in a direct confrontation), and that Flintheart believes said tactics are betrayals of his "dear old mother's fondest hopes".

Barks would use Flintheart for a third and last time in So Far and no Safari, first published in January 1966. This was one of the last stories Barks created before his retirement. The themes of the story are considerably darker than the two previous ones. Flintheart's intentions towards Scrooge are clearly depicted as murderous. The story starts with Scrooge planning to participate in an auction for an old South African gold mine. It is considered exhausted, but Scrooge's mechanics believe that the main vein of gold has not even been reached. While Scrooge is piloting his private plane over South Africa, with Donald, Huey, Dewey, and Louie as passengers, Flintheart appears piloting his own plane. It is equipped with machine guns, with which he shoots down Scrooge. While Scrooge is still trying to reach the auction, Flintheart repeatedly tries to get rid of him.

When Scrooge manages to reach the Kalahari Desert, Flintheart's plane is revealed to be a bomber as well. Flintheart bombards Scrooge and his nephews, but misses. When he returns for a second bombing run, the Ducks have dressed some rocks with their clothing and have taken cover elsewhere. Flintheart mistakes the rocks for his targets and destroys them, noting that his rivals are now dinner for the jackals. His victory is short-lived, however. Because he was flying low, the bomb explosions damaged his plane's fuel tank. He crash-lands the plane and finds himself in no better condition than Scrooge. The rest of the story presents Scrooge's and Flintheart's rival efforts to cross the Kalahari and reach the auction. The end of the story finds them at the auction, tired from their difficult treks, but still rivaling each other, while an exhausted Donald has fallen asleep. (Who finally obtained the gold mine is not revealed.) It is considered Flintheart's darkest appearance and among his strongest and most memorable ones.

=== After Barks ===
During the ten years that followed his creator's retirement the character made infrequent appearances, appearing only in four comic book stories. He was not nearly as recognizable as other rivals of Scrooge, like Italian sorceress Magica De Spell, who appeared far more often. Flintheart returned to prominence in 1979, when Egmont editors Lars Bergström and Stefan Printz-Påhlson decided to revive the character. Since then, Flintheart Glomgold has appeared in more than 100 Egmont stories, some of which depict him as an influential member of Duckburg's Billionaires Club (which also includes Scrooge and John D. Rockerduck).

Flintheart Glomgold and his nephew Slackjaw Snorehead.

In Werner Wejp-Olsen and Daniel Branca's 1981 comic book story "The Top Treasure in Town", Flintheart's grandfather, Stoneheart Glomgold, who in 1870 worked as a hansom cab driver in London, is introduced. In John Lustig and Vicar's comic book story "Family of Fore" (2001) it is stated that Flintheart and Scrooge are both distantly related to the then-deceased Scottish golf enthusiast Bogey McDivot. McDivot has only been mentioned in that story. In Lars Jensen and Vicar's 2002 comic book story "Happy Birthday, Flintheart Glomgold", Glomgold's nephew, Slackjaw Snorehead, is introduced. Slackjaw is a genial slacker; very friendly and cheerful as well as a genius with a talent for business. He prefers to hang around with his friends and do nothing all day rather than use his intellect productively, which is infuriating to Glomgold. In the English translation, Slackjaw at times uses South African slang (e.g. howzit or brasse).

In Lars Jensen and Marco Rota's 2005 story "The Glomgold Heritage", Flintheart's father, Brickheart Glomgold, and mother appeared briefly. It is also revealed in this story that Flintheart's grandfather, Stoneheart, was a Scotsman who moved to London and later on, together with his son Brickheart, traveled to South Africa after being wrongly accused for theft. From this experience, the Glomgolds learned that the world was unfair and cruel, and that they had to look out for themselves even if that meant acting outside the law.

In the 1988 DuckTales comic book story "The Smart Nephew" by Bob Gregory, Cosme Quartieri, and Jorge Sanchez, another nephew of Glomgold appears: the smart and brave Junior.

=== Under Don Rosa ===
In 1987 Keno Don Rosa created his first Scrooge McDuck story, "The Son of the Sun", first published in July 1987. Rosa's detailed style of drawing, references to Barks stories (by then considered classic) like "Lost in the Andes!", detailed references to often obscure historical figures and events and strong characterization would later make Rosa fans consider him one of Barks' most popular "successors". Those themes are all evident in his first story. It begins with Flintheart questioning Scrooge's many successes as a treasure-hunter. He claims that discovering riches that are already concentrated by others is not that hard and that he could do it better than Scrooge if he decided to try. Soon, he is following Scrooge and his nephews in their latest treasure hunt, locating a hidden temple of Manco Cápac, who was the legendary founder of the Inca dynasty. The temple is hidden somewhere in the tops of the Andes and, according to inscriptions earlier found by Scrooge, supposed to contain a great treasure. In the course of the story Flintheart is shown to be one of Scrooge's most charismatic, resourceful, and ruthless rivals.

Rosa, who admits to have a soft spot for the character, has used Flintheart in a growing number of stories and has offered him a sort of origin. In his stories, Flintheart is a Boer from the province of Transvaal. He was born around the same time as Scrooge and first met him during the Witwatersrand Gold Rush in 1886, a key event leading to the founding of Johannesburg. Like Scrooge, Flintheart was born in poverty and was working his way up the financial ladder. While unsuccessfully searching for diamonds, he attempted to steal the findings of more successful fellow miners. As a result, he was tied to the horns of a water buffalo and the animal was then sent running. Flintheart was found and saved by Scrooge. Flintheart offered to be the guide of the recently arrived gold miner from Scotland, since he knew the territory. Scrooge accepted him as a needed companion and friend. But at night while Scrooge was sleeping, Flintheart stole his ox-cart along with all his equipment and supplies and left him alone in the wilderness. Having underestimated Scrooge, he was surprised when Scrooge caught up to him, furious and vengeful. When Scrooge finished with him, Flintheart was publicly humiliated, thoroughly embittered, and imprisoned for theft. The two rivals made vows to themselves that helped shape some of their character traits. Scrooge vowed to never trust anybody ever again, in order not to be betrayed again. Apparently this is the source of Scrooge's distrust towards others whether they are allies, rivals, or complete strangers and the reason he is secretive about his thoughts and emotions. On the other hand, a completely defeated Flintheart vowed that he will work to become so rich that nobody can humiliate him again (see Life and Times of Scrooge McDuck – Part VI: The Terror of the Transvaal). Because Scrooge officially meets Glomgold for the first time during "The Second Richest Duck" in 1956, Don Rosa makes sure Glomgold's name is never mentioned until after he and Scrooge have parted ways. Since Glomgold gets Scrooge's name, some fans could think he is more interested in defeating and humiliating Scrooge as revenge for getting imprisoned rather than becoming the world's richest duck. According to Rosa's unofficial timelines, it would take him twenty years of hard work as a diamond miner till finally he became rich in 1906 by his profits. He would spend the next fifty years working his way up the financial ladder both by hard efforts and dishonest methods when needed.

Don Rosa also revealed in at least two stories another thing that makes Flintheart a counterpart to Scrooge: the Number One Rand, the first coin Flintheart Glomgold ever earned (or stole). In Return to Plain Awful, this rand makes his first appearance, a cameo, and has nothing to do with the story, alongside a framed pound note labelled as Glomgold's "No. 1 Pound" and a diamond under a glass dome labelled as "My First Diamond". In A Little Something Special, the Rand makes an equally small but more relevant role. Magica De Spell teamed up with him and the Beagle Boys to get the Number One Dime. Scrooge reminds Magica he will no longer be the richest duck in the world after they steal his fortune, and the Dime will be worthless to her. Based on the advice Scrooge gives her in exchange for his dime back, Magica steals Flintheart's first rand. To make things worse for Glomgold, Magica takes the Beagle Boys with her to the Valley of Limpopo, where they carry all they can of Flintheart's cash. Despite the fact he teamed up with them in that story against Scrooge, he still dares to ask what did he do to deserve that.

Notable is the fact that Flintheart Glomgold's first coin could not be a rand, because the South African Rand did not come into existence until 1961. Before a unified South Africa in 1910 (whereupon the South African pound was introduced), many authorities in the region issued coins and banknotes in their own currencies, often equivalent to the Pound Sterling of the Cape of Good Hope colony that had existed since 1825. Adding it to the fact that Don Rosa's stories usually take place in the 1950s, this meant it would be impossible for anyone to own a rand in such stories.

== Animation and other appearances ==
Flintheart Glomgold as he appeared in DuckTales

An animated version of the character appeared in the TV series DuckTales, which started airing on September 18, 1987. The Second Richest Duck was among the series' most prominent characters, and this helped his introduction to a wider audience. But some drastic changes came to the character. He lives an elaborate but decaying mansion in Duckburg, is depicted as wearing a traditional Scottish kilt. His voice actor Hal Smith gave him a gravelly and recognisably Scottish accent. No reference to South Africa is ever made. The previously unaffiliated Beagle Boys were now depicted as working for him on an occasional basis. In "Attack of the Metal Mites", Glomgold sends the metal mites to eat whole money from Scrooge's bin. Glomgold almost succeeds when Fenton Crackshell stopped the metal mites and the last ones retrieved by Dijon spread in Glomgold's office. The biggest humiliation of all this is the fact Scrooge finds a way to earn honest money with the metal mites captured by Fenton. In ""The Golden Goose" (Part 2)" after stealing a magical Golden Goose, Glomgold seems to have beaten Scrooge as "The Richest Duck In the World" until he is turned into gold himself.

Glomgold is also a recurring antagonist in the DuckTales comic book series, notably the series Scrooge's Quest. In the final chapter of that series, "All That Glitters Is Not Glomgold", Glomgold has taken advantage of Scrooge's long absence and distraction to buy out all of Scrooge's assets and seize control of Duckburg. While Scrooge was a more benevolent businessman, Glomgold is determined to soak the city's people for as much money as he can, charging exorbitant prices for food and services, while keeping their lives as closely regimented as possible. Scrooge cannily uses Glomgold's own paranoia against him, wandering around town, making apparently innocuous inspections of Glomgold's businesses, and causing Glomgold to tear apart his own holdings, looking for Scrooge's sabotage. By the end of the comic, Glomgold has destroyed all of his assets in Duckburg, and Scrooge has regained his own fortune. As Scrooge explains to his nephews, "Glomgold is so evil and sneaky that he thinks everyone is as evil and sneaky as he is." Yet, in the final pages of the comic, Glomgold seems to be perfectly content, living in a wooden shanty in Duckburg's slums, sharing a meager meal with one of his former clerks. As Glomgold explains, now that he has nothing left, there's nothing further that Scrooge can do to him, and Glomgold is looking forward to making himself rich again, since making a fortune is much more satisfying than having one. In this he reflects much of Scrooge's own philosophy.

In the Disney series Darkwing Duck episode "In Like Blunt", Glomgold makes a cameo appearance-along with the Beagle Boys and Magica De Spell-as a bidder for the secret S.H.U.S.H. agent list.

Glomgold, now voiced by Keith Ferguson, returns as Scrooge's nemesis in the 2017 reboot of DuckTales. Glomgold now appears much stouter than in previous versions, while his outfit remains relatively unchanged from the 1987 series. His personality is much more comedic in the reboot, being portrayed as incompetent, foolish, and obsessed with maniacal schemes and one-upping Scrooge McDuck. He is also the head of Glomgold Industries, through which he builds up his fortune through personal branding and making products as cheaply as possible. Throughout the first season, it was initially implied that this Glomgold is South African but pretends to be Scottish in order to outdo Scrooge McDuck. This is confirmed in the second season episode, "The Ballad of Duke Baloney!", where it is revealed that Glomgold was born Duke Baloney, a shoeshine boy who did Scrooge's shoes and given a dime as payment to teach him self-reliance, only for Duke to instead feel cheated and create his "Glomgold" persona over the years to get revenge.

Flintheart also appears in the 1989 DuckTales video game for the Nintendo Entertainment System (NES). After Scrooge completes all the regular levels, Flintheart challenges him to a race in which the winner will take all of the treasure Scrooge has acquired. Glomgold also appears in the 1993 video game sequel DuckTales 2, also for the NES, once again trying to obtain the treasures that Scrooge had collected and also kidnaps Webby in order to get Scrooge to hand over the treasure. When he does Glomgold is revealed to be the final boss the D-1000. In DuckTales: Remastered, Glomgold is voiced by Brian George (Hal Smith had died in 1994), and his role is greatly expanded. In Remastered, Glomgold attacks Scrooge in the Himalayas, attempting to shoot Launchpad out of the skies, but is thwarted by Scrooge. He appears again on the Moon, attempting to collect the Green Cheese of Longevity before Scrooge does. Later, he forms an uneasy alliance with Scrooge to help him rescue his nephews from Magica De Spell, but later reveals that he was in cahoots with her all along in order to get Scrooge's Number One Dime from him for her own purposes. As in the original, Scrooge must race Glomgold and Magica in order to reclaim his Number One Dime in the end. Glomgold appeared in Ducktales: Scrooge's Loot, and also as Boss in the RPG card game titled The Duckforce Rises for Android and iOS.

Glomgold is the main antagonist in the PC game DuckTales: The Quest for Gold. In the intro scene, he barges into Scrooge's office, lamenting about he is tired being the second richest duck in the world, and challenges Scrooge to a wealth contest sponsored by Dime Magazine: in the next 30 days, the one who collects the most treasure shall be the Duck of the Year. The contest is held in the Isle of Macaroon, which is a homage to the four-parter "Catch as Cash Can" episode, except that the contest gives 30 days, not 10. Just like in the episodes, Glomgold hires the Beagle Boys against Scrooge and his nephews, and will constantly try to race Scrooge to the treasure locations, or snatching treasure from other locations. The ultimate goal of the game is to collect more money, thus, beating Glomgold and becoming Duck of the Year.

Glomgold appeared on the 2012 list of the Forbes Fictional 15, a compilation of the wealthiest characters in fiction. A spike in the price of gold during the late 2000s and early 2010s allowed Glomgold to become the second-wealthiest fictional character. His nemesis, Scrooge McDuck (who has appeared in most of the Fictional 15 lists to date), surpassed him in the 2013 list, in which Glomgold did not appear.

== Predecessor ==
A few years prior to Flintheart's debut, another character was described as the World's Second-Richest Duck. His only appearance took place in Carl Barks' story "Turkey With All the Schemings". In that story, Donald found himself unable to afford a Christmas dinner and decided to trick Scrooge into paying for dinner for him. To do so, Donald posed as a South American businessman named Petrolio de Vaselino and had Scrooge take him to the Ritz. While eating dessert, Donald accidentally ate his phony moustache, making him look like the Duke of Baloni, described by Scrooge as the World's Second-Richest Duck. By coincidence, Scrooge had a newspaper article talking about the Duke visiting Duckburg. The fact Scrooge remained willing to make business with him suggests the Duke never claimed to be richer than him. Not much else is known about the real Duke since he just made a cameo at the beginning of the last page and his only purpose in the story was cluing (via his presence) Scrooge to the fact he was dealing with an imposter. After removing Donald's wig, Scrooge was determined to make Donald pay. He asked the waiter if the restaurant was for sale and was given a price of one million dollars. In a surprising move, as he had spent the whole last night trying to make sure Donald would not leave and force him to pay the bill, Scrooge quickly pulled the required amount from his pockets and bought the restaurant. Donald then was forced to wash the dishes to pay the bill. It is never said when Flintheart became richer than the Duke or if the two ever met. However, this is homaged in the 2017 DuckTales animated series, where it is revealed that "Duke Baloney" is Flintheart's birth name.
