= The Secret of Atlantis =

- Story code: W US 5-02
- Story: Carl Barks
- Ink: Carl Barks
- Date: March–May 1954
- Pages: 32
- Layout: 4 rows per page
- Appearances: Uncle Scrooge; Donald Duck; Huey, Dewey and Louie
- First publication: Uncle Scrooge #5

"The Secret of Atlantis" is a 32-page Disney comics story written and drawn by Carl Barks, and lettered by his wife, Garé Barks.

The story was first published in Uncle Scrooge #5 (March–May 1954) by Dell Publishing with three one-page gag stories by the Barkses: "Hospitality Week", "McDuck Takes a Dive", and "Slippery Sipper". The cover was drawn by Barks. The Secret of Atlantis and the gag stories have been reprinted many times.

Characters in the story include Uncle Scrooge, Donald Duck, and Donald's nephews: Huey, Dewey, and Louie. The "Junior Woodchuck's Book of Knowledge", a forerunner of the Junior Woodchuck Guidebook, is mentioned, and the story features the first appearance of Scrooge's "worry room". Another first time debut was Donald's residence, listed as "1313 Webfoot Drive".

It was split into three parts that ran conjunctive to each other, who gets the last word on debt, chasing after a coin which culminates into a pie fight (at a place called the "Atlas Bakery", giving a cryptic hint of the main plot), then finally Scrooge and Donald's discovery, and subsequent escape from, Atlantis.

== Plot ==
After checking his books, Uncle Scrooge sees a long overdue debt from 1950. He angrily remarks that the debt is too small to litigate, then decides to hire Donald Duck as a debt collector, promising him 50%, only for Donald to learn he is the debtor, owing ten cents. A battle of the last word ensues when Donald pays the debt with a quarter, demanding change plus his fee, then laughs he settled his debt to Scrooge for 1/2. Scrooge pulls one over on Donald by giving him a nickel from Balonia. However, when the nephews remark that currency is no longer minted as Balonia became defunct after the First World War, Donald sells the nickel to a coin dealer for five American dollars. Uncle Scrooge admits Donald won, but seeks another plan, using the same 1916 American quarter Donald originally paid with.

Scrooge then launches into incessant advertising, saying he will pay 50 cents to anyone who holds a 1916 quarter. This results in everyone sending him their quarters simply for the advertising to stop. Scrooge then takes a cargo plane and dumps all the quarters into the Atlantic Ocean, save for Donald's own, which is now appraised at the astronomical amount of ten skyrillion dollars. However, a mishap causes the quarter to roll all over Duckburg and the ducks cause all sorts of mishap to retrieve it, only for it to ultimately end up being flattened by a steamroller.

The coin needs to be replaced, but Scrooge mopes he hid the coins too well. However, when Scrooge recalls a specific patch of ocean where he dumped the coins, the nephews pinpoint it, causing Scrooge to get scientists to invent high-pressure diving suits. When Donald and Scrooge dive, they see the depths are actually become lighter instead of darker, thanks to bioluminescent fish. It's then that they discover the lost city of Atlantis. At first believed to be a ghost town, they are shocked to see fish people who bring them before their king, and the fish people are wearing the quarters as jewelry, as Atlantean law states anything that falls from the "air world" becomes Atlantean property. The king says that Donald and Scrooge will become subjects of Atlantis, and forbids them to leave for soon more would be here out of curiosity, and greedy men would also attack Atlantis to rob it of its treasures.

The ducks are imprisoned until they have been determined to be good citizens of Atlantis. A fishman wearing a mortarboard hat, who is called "Professor", has been ordered to help the ducks acculturate. The professor explains that Atlantis was originally an Egyptian colony until a massive earthquake caused the land to sink. The land subsidence was slow, and the men kept building the cities farther up mountains, topped with conelike air intakes, until everything was sunk. However, in trying to fight the drowning, the humans found they could adapt underwater, and for millennia have been evolving with gills and other fishlike traits.

When Dewey and Huey dive to rescue their uncles, they suffer the same fate of being imprisoned. However, they feign interest in living in Atlantis, which pleases the Professor to which he elects to release them on a guided tour of the city (but keeps Scrooge and Donald imprisoned, knowing they are not genuine). The Professor shows how electric fish aid Atlanteans in tasks such as lighting and cooking. When the nephews ask how the Professor speaks English, he replies Atlanteans know all languages of the air world, as the world's original language was spoken in Atlantis, and the sinking spared Atlanteans from the diaspora caused by the destruction of the Tower of Babel. The nephews then encounter a sunken cargo plane, which has been cordoned as off-limits, as such planes in the past have caused destruction to Atlantis due to unexploded bombs. However, exploring it the nephews find the plane was carrying jukeboxes. The Professor is at first cautious of such a device, but his intellectual curiosity gets the better of him and he admits the Atlanteans haven't made music. The jukebox doesn't work, but the Professor summons an electric eel to power the appliance, and provides one of the 1916 quarters to pay for a song. When a 1940s big band song starts playing, an excited Professor summons the entire population, and soon all Atlanteans are enjoying a dance party. When the guards join in on the party, Huey and Dewey grab a sack of quarters, then free their two uncles. The four swim to the freedom, but are almost stopped by guards throwing tridents at them. One of them ruptures the sack of quarters, and Scrooge is only able to save one. Upon reaching a shallow depth, the Atlanteans must give up, as they risk asphyxiation for their lungs have evolved as being unable to breathe the surface air. The king begs them not to reveal their existence, and Dewey gives his word of honor as a Junior Woodchuck not to do so.

Now back to safety, Scrooge promises that he will sell the sole quarter as soon as they reach home. But when he attempts to sell the ten skyrillion dollar quarter, the coin dealer replies that there is only one person in the world wealthy enough to afford such as astronomical sum: Scrooge himself.

== See also ==
- List of Disney comics by Carl Barks

== References in later works ==
Don Rosa's 1987 comic story The Son of the Sun, opens with a tour through a Duckburg museum, exhibiting many of the treasures Scrooge has found in classic Barks stories. Also on display in the 1916 quarter, which is still for sale.
