= The Beagle Boys vs. the Money Bin =

- Cover for the Finnish publication of the story
- Story code: D 2000-191
- Story: Don Rosa
- Ink: Don Rosa
- Hero: Scrooge McDuck
- Pages: 17
- Layout: 4 rows per page
- Appearances: Scrooge McDuck; Donald Duck (cameo); Blackheart Beagle; The Beagle Boys
- First publication: 2001

"The Beagle Boys vs. the Money Bin" is a 2001 Donald Duck comic by Don Rosa. Rosa's inspiration for it was mostly to get a chance to thoroughly demonstrate the Money Bin, invented by Carl Barks.

The story was first published in the Danish Anders And & Co. #2001-21; the first American publication was in Uncle Scrooge #325, in January 2004.

== Plot ==
The Beagle Boys visit their grandfather, Blackheart Beagle, in prison to celebrate the anniversary of his founding of the original Beagle Boys gang. Blackheart uses this chance to inform his grandsons of having remembered the architect, who designed the Money Bin. Since the architect's office is located underneath Duckburg, Blackheart suggests his grandsons to see if they can find the blueprint of the Money Bin. Blackheart remains in prison, but his grandsons are free to try out the plan. They find the blueprint, and it shows a secret passageway to Scrooge McDuck's money, located in Scrooge's bedroom.

While Scrooge is away, the Beagle Boys sneak into the Money Bin. However, by twists of fate - mostly caused by the Beagle Boys' personal lust for treasure, prunes, or personal fame, or just simple curiosity - they get caught in situations where they're mostly unable to even move, without triggering the bin's alarms or risking personal injury.

After an extremely long and stressful work day, Scrooge comes home late in the evening. He waves good night to a painting of Glittering Goldie, and goes to bed. In his tired stupor, he mistakes the various trapped Beagle Boys he sees for household items, until he climbs into bed and "turns out" the Beagle Boy trapped at his bedside, mistaking him for a lamp. Realizing his mistake, Scrooge calls the police, who arrest the Beagle Boys.

Back in prison, Blackheart Beagle hears of this, and curses his grandsons for being so stupid that they lost not to Scrooge, but to an empty concrete building.

== Notes ==
This story was created to celebrate the 50th anniversary of the Beagle Boys and Scrooge's Money Bin.

One of the Beagle Boys mentions that the Candy Striped Ruby will be theirs. This is a reference to The Status Seeker, where they steal the Candy Striped Ruby from Scrooge.

One of the Beagles reads a Duck Tales comic when he is in the bathroom despite the fact that Duck Tales doesn't exist in the Duck Universe.

The plans for the Money Bin found in the architect's office are signed "K.D. Rosa", which is Don Rosa's real name, although he mentioned in the same story that the architect's name is Frank Lloyd Drake.
