= Return to Plain Awful =

1989 Donald Duck comic by Don Rosa

- Cover of Uncle Scrooge by Don Rosa
- Story code: AR 130
- Story: Don Rosa
- Ink: Don Rosa
- Hero: Donald Duck
- Pages: 28
- Layout: 4 rows per page
- Appearances: Donald Duck; Scrooge McDuck; Flintheart Glomgold; Huey, Dewey and Louie
- First publication: Donald Duck Adventures #12 (May 1989)

"Return to Plain Awful" is a Donald Duck story that was originally printed during the Gladstone Publishing run of Donald Duck Adventures, issue #12 in May 1989. It was written by Don Rosa as a sequel to "Lost in the Andes!" by Carl Barks, to commemorate that story's 40th anniversary.

== Plot ==
Donald Duck and his nephews journey back to Plain Awful. This time, Scrooge McDuck goes with them. Scrooge plans to buy some square eggs from the natives, while Donald and the nephews plan to return the roosters they brought back from their first visit. Unfortunately, Flintheart Glomgold also wants the square eggs and again serves as Scrooge's unscrupulous rival.

In Plain Awful, the ducks discover that, since their last visit, the highly imitative residents have sculpted their entire culture around the appearance and personality of Donald Duck (just as they had previously built their entire culture around the personality of their previous visitor). One aspect of Plain Awful's culture that has remained constant, however, is the law forbidding round objects, which Scrooge inadvertently violates by showing the natives his Number One Dime. As a result, he is held prisoner in the stone quarries, finishing the square eggs deal for good. However, Plain Awful's "President" (The leader decided to imitate America's system after Donald and his nephews' first visit) offers Scrooge a full pardon and reconsideration of the square eggs deal, if they bring him a rare item called "Ice Cream Soda".

Donald and the nephews have to team up with Flintheart to deliver an Ice Cream Soda to the President of Plain Awful: Donald and his nephews need Flintheart to get the soda, while Flintheart needs guidance back to civilization since he arrived at Plain Awful just by a stroke of luck. Flintheart betrays them after getting the soda, forcing them to improvise making an ice cream soda on the spot, using dried milk, sugar, and chocolate from their ration packs, plus some snow and carbonated water from a fire extinguisher.

Scrooge and Glomgold race to the city with their sodas, but are surprised to see the natives now imitating them, instead of Donald. The President (now the "Chairman of the Board") declares he is no longer interested in ice cream sodas, but instead asks for some money to store in Plain Awful's newly made money bin. Since Flintheart spent all his cash on the helicopter that brought them to Plain Awful (except for a coin, which he wouldn't show after what happened to Scrooge), Scrooge gives one billion dollars (in bills) for his freedom. Plain Awful's "chairman" happily accepts the money, but to Scrooge and Flintheart's horror, the bills are chopped in two (leaving perfect square halves) and put on public display inside the bin.

Scrooge and Flintheart are so disgusted by this that they want nothing more to do with Plain Awful, abandoning their aspirations of gaining export rights to the square eggs. The story ends with Huey, Dewey, and Louie leaving a copy of the Junior Woodchuck's Guidebook as a farewell gift to the natives, and Donald making fun of Scrooge and his famous motto, since the natives made their first billion "by being tougher than the toughies and smarter than the smarties! And they made it SQUARE!"

== See also ==
- "Return to Plain Awful" served as the title story to Fantagraphics Uncle Scrooge and Donald Duck: The Don Rosa Library Vol. 2
