= Magica De Spell =

Disney comics character

- Donald Duck character
- Magica De Spell as she appears in the original DuckTales series.
- First appearance: "The Midas Touch" in Uncle Scrooge #36 (December 1961)
- Created by: Carl Barks
- Voiced by: June Foray (1987–2013); Catherine Tate (2017–2021)

In-universe information
- Species: Duck
- Gender: Female
- Occupation: Sorceress
- Family: Leone De Spell (father); Magnolia De Spell (mother); Poe De Spell (brother); Minima De Spell (niece); Lena De Spell ("niece" / creation); Donata De Spell (aunt); Gino (uncle); Matilda and Adelia (cousins); Caraldina De Spell (paternal grandmother); Tragica De Spell (paternal great-grandmother); De Spell family
- Nationality: Italian

Magica De Spell (magica being Italian for 'magical') is a cartoon character created in 1961 by Carl Barks for the Duck universe. An Italian sorceress, she constantly attempts to steal Scrooge McDuck's Number One Dime, which she believes will magically help her to become as fabulously wealthy as its owner.

== Appearance ==
Magica is an anthropomorphic white duck with a yellow-orange bill, legs, and feet. She has black hair and purple eyeshadow and typically wears a black dress. In the 2017 reboot of DuckTales, her feathers are green instead of white and she wears a cape with a hood. After Magica loses her magic powers at the end of the first season, her feathers became white. She later returns to her original appearance after regaining her magic in the third-season episode "The Phantom and the Sorceress!".

== Publication history ==
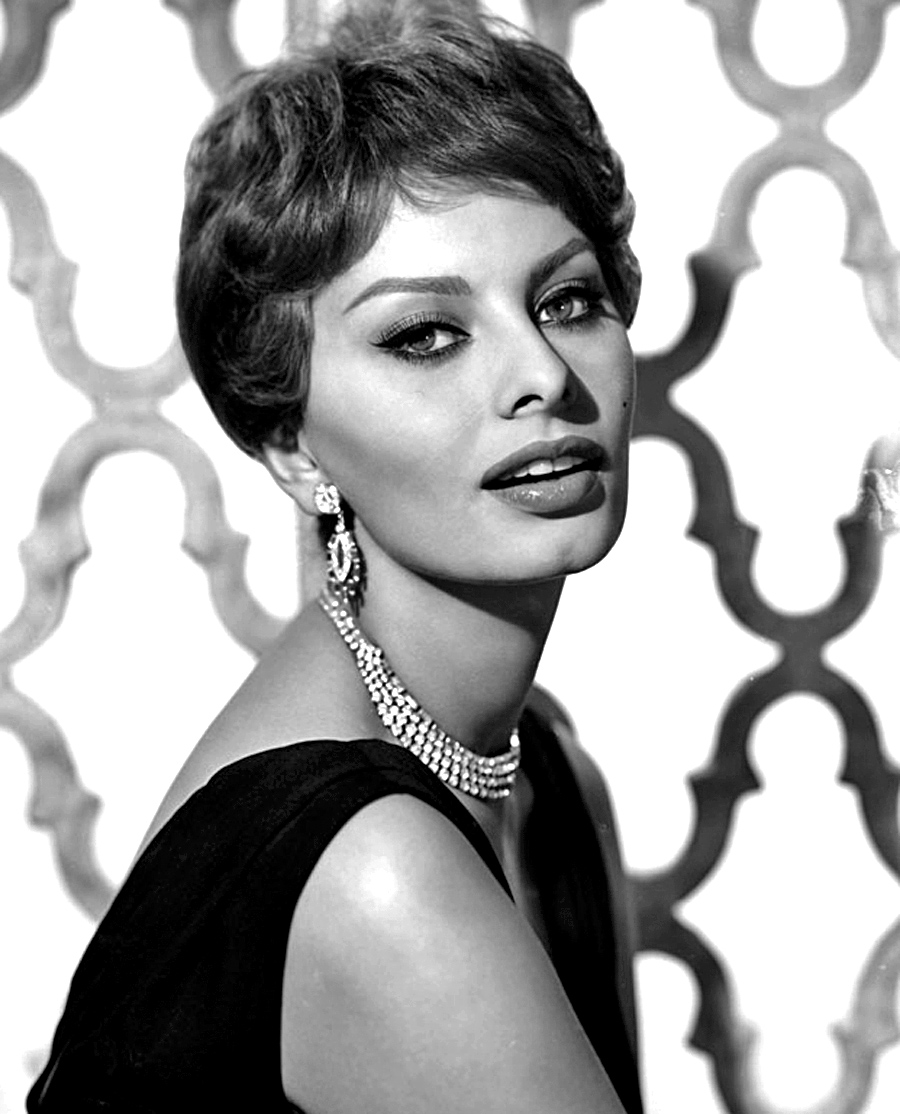
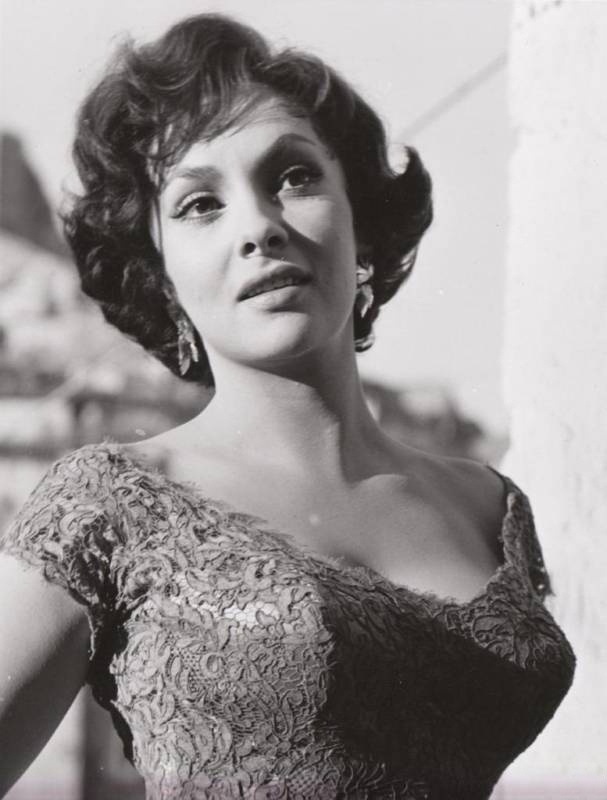
Magica's appearance was inspired by Italian actresses Sophia Loren (left) and Gina Lollobrigida (right).

De Spell first appeared in "The Midas Touch", first published in Uncle Scrooge #36 (December 1961). According to Barks, he intended to create her as another recurring antagonist for Scrooge in addition to the Beagle Boys and Flintheart Glomgold. In contrast to Witch Hazel from Trick or Treat — first released on October 10, 1952 — or Madam Mim, she would not be in the image of the ugly old hag usually associated with witches. Barks instead decided to create a witch who was young and beautiful, so he took inspiration for her look from Italian actresses Gina Lollobrigida and Sophia Loren. He also wanted her to be seductive, amoral, and somewhat threatening. In a later interview, Barks identified a similar figure from the comic strips of Charles Addams as another source of inspiration for Magica, namely Morticia Addams of The Addams Family.

All in all, Barks drew nine stories with Magica: The Midas Touch in 1961; Ten-Cent Valentine, The Unsafe Safe, and Raven Mad in 1962; Oddball Odyssey, For Old Dime's Sake, and Isle of Golden Geese in 1963; The Many Faces of Magica de Spell, and lastly Rug Riders in the Sky in 1964. In the latter, Barks tried to increase the usability of the character by having plots turn on other magic artifacts – here, a flying carpet – not always having to repeat the joke about Scrooge's first coin. Magica also appeared as an antagonist in the Wizards of Mickey comic series as part of a trio of sorceresses who all had rivalries with each other.

== Character biography ==
According to Barks and his successors, Magica lives on the slopes of Mount Vesuvius, next to Naples, Italy. Her primary motivation is to steal Scrooge's Number One Dime and melt it in the fires of the volcano, so she can turn it into a powerful magical amulet capable of granting the Midas Touch.

While she has worked with criminals – the Beagle Boys, for example – to get Scrooge's Dime, Magica typically works with individuals such as a raven named Ratface in the comics and apprentices like Samson Hex, a bungling no-hoper. Magica's family members have also appeared in the comics; her grandmother Granny De Spell, who has been no more successful in obtaining the Number One Dime despite claiming to be one of the most powerful witches; her sister, the Wicked Witch of the West; the Wicked Witch's mischievous daughter Witch Child and son Warlock, who Magica is sometimes tasked with babysitting; another niece, Minima De Spell; and a cousin named Witch Matilda, who has served under Magica as an apprentice. Another character connected to Magica is Rosolio, a dim-witted goose who claims to be her fiancé despite always being rejected. He is supported in this by another grandmother of Magica's, Caraldina (original Italian name), created in the Italian comics. In crossover comics, one of her most frequent companions is Mad Madam Mim.

Magica has an odd relationship with Scrooge. For example, in the 1987 DuckTales episode "Till Nephews Do Us Part", she and Poe are invited to and attend Scrooge's wedding. However, she has maintained an antagonistic relationship with him and his family, including Donald Duck, Huey, Dewey, and Louie, Gyro Gearloose, Gladstone Gander, as well as Daisy Duck and her nieces.

== In animation ==
=== DuckTales ===
Magica appears as a recurring villain on the animated television show DuckTales, where she was voiced by June Foray (using a similar Eastern European accent to that of Natasha Fatale from Rocky & Bullwinkle; in the Italian version, Magica's voice actress, Sonia Scotti, depicted her with a heavy Neapolitan accent). Magica appears mostly in first-season episodes of the show. Although she appears as one of the series' major villains, she is frequently a source of comic relief; for example, in Magica's final scene in the series, she attempts to send Scrooge's "tin man back to Oz", but instead sent herself elsewhere in a whirlwind when a Quackenyeeken Yeeker bird yeeks in fear, causing her jar of magic dust to break open and carry her away. On more than one occasion, her plan to obtain Scrooge's dime backfires so spectacularly that she is forced to work with Scrooge to prevent a greater disaster. According to the show, her brother is Poe De Spell, who was transformed into a raven and serves as her magical familiar – in reference to Edgar Allan Poe's poem "The Raven" – replacing Ratface from the comics. A similar reference had already been established in the German versions of Magica comics, where her raven is called "Nimmermehr" ("Nevermore"), referring to the recurring keyword from Poe's poem.

Magica De Spell in the 2017 DuckTales reboot

In the 2017 reboot, Magica speaks with an English accent as she is voiced by Catherine Tate (former Doctor Who costar to David Tennant, who voices Scrooge McDuck in the new series). Within the reboot's storyline, Magica has a history with Clan McDuck and a vendetta against Scrooge; he caused her to accidentally turn Poe into a non-anthropomorphic raven and refused to stop him from flying away prior to the start of the series. During a climactic battle atop Mount Vesuvius (a famous setting from Tennant and Tate's tenure on Doctor Who) 15 years prior, Scrooge trapped her physical body within his Number One Dime, though she was able to turn her own shadow into her "niece", Lena De Spell. Throughout the first season, Magica manifests herself as a shadowy specter through Lena and uses her to gain the Duck family's trust to acquire Scrooge's Dime and free herself from imprisonment. Magica eventually regains her corporeal form during an eclipse that occurred in the season one finale, and proceeded to terrorize Duckburg with her dark magical powers. However, she is defeated and forced to flee after being stripped of her powers by the combined efforts of Scrooge and his family in destroying her staff. In the second-season episode, "A Nightmare on Killmotor Hill!", Magica uses a telepathic helmet to invade Lena's dreams and get her to give up her magic amulet, though she is foiled once more and Lena destroys her helmet. In a later episode, "GlomTales!", she joins an alliance of Scrooge's greatest enemies, led by Flintheart Glomgold, in a joint effort to destroy Scrooge and his family. Glomgold ends up losing his fortune, as well as that of the other villains', to Louie Duck, causing the former's fellow villains to turn on him. In season three, Magica regained her powers while helping Lena and her friends fend off the Phantom Blot, whose village Magica destroyed in the past. In turn, she is fended off by Lena, who had gained magical abilities of her own during the fight. Magica appears along with Scrooge's other enemies to destroy him through a court trial, but fails again. Finally in the series finale, Magica and every villain the Duck family have faced were brainwashed by F.O.W.L. to fight the heroes, which was part of Bradford Buzzard's plot to rid the world of adventures. Upon his defeat, Magica is enraged by him using her and the other villains, turns him into a non-sapient buzzard in revenge, and then teleports away.

=== Darkwing Duck ===
Magica makes a cameo appearance in the Darkwing Duck episode "In Like Blunt" along with the Beagle Boys and Flintheart Glomgold, among the bidders for the secret S.H.U.S.H. agent list.

She had a proper role in the Darkwing Duck comic published by Boom! Studios, teaming up with Negaduck (whom she had saved from the Crimebots from "The Duck Knight Returns") in the story "Crisis on Infinite Darkwings". By combining their powers and knowledge, they intended to unleash an army of brainwashed, alternate universe Darkwing Ducks on St. Canard, as it would be of benefit to both their agendas – her hope is to force Darkwing's ally Launchpad McQuack to lead her to Scrooge's Number One Dime. Magica and Negaduck had contempt for each other, which they kept hidden behind a 'friendly' facade; early on, Negaduck sarcastically refers to his desire for a city and hers for "...one dime" as being "similar ambitions".

Darkwing's girlfriend Morgana McCawber, herself a witch, would assist the hero and battle Magica in magical combat. She swiftly drained Morgana's magic using a source absorber, doubling her power, but lost it thanks to the intervention of an alternate Darkwing. This ended her control over the alternate reality Darkwings and ended Negaduck's plan, and after the arrival of the monstrous demon Paddywhack, Magica fled the city.

She returned for the final arc of the series, a crossover with the DuckTales comic also published by Boom!, where she teamed up with other female Disney villains and exploited black "slime" that could turn normal people evil and villains into stronger forms. She used it to bring in an army of villains from Duckburg and St. Canard, as well as a brainwashed Phantom Blot, and tried to seize both cities so she could have all of Scrooge McDuck's assets. To her dismay, the slime turned out to be a transformed Negaduck, who seized control of the plan before all the villains were banished to another dimension. This last arc was later made non-canonical, and not included in the omnibus of the series.

== Video games ==
Magica appears in the DuckTales video game for the Nintendo Entertainment System as the boss of the Transylvania stage, where she attacks Scrooge with lightning bolts and by transforming into a giant bird. In the remake DuckTales Remastered, Magica uses an expanded set of attacks (such as launching energy beams at Scrooge and summoning mirrors to hide in) and also plays a larger role in the game's overall storyline. Just like in the cartoon, she is voiced by June Foray.

Other video game appearances by Magica include The Lucky Dime Caper: Starring Donald Duck, in which she kidnaps Donald's nephews and steals Scrooge's lucky dime, and in the 2000 video game Donald Duck: Goin' Quackers as the boss of a flying mansion. Magica also appears as the second secret playable character in the 2008 trivia video game Disney TH!NK Fast.

Magica De Spell appears as a playable character in the mobile game Disney Heroes: Battle Mode.

== Attributes ==
=== Powers and abilities ===
Magica De Spell is a very powerful witch with magical powers that include teleportation, flight, the power to conjure and transmute matter, and shapeshifting. Her actual capability to wield magic varies from writer to writer. Carl Barks' incarnation is quite powerful, with her naivete being her only prominent weakness. Don Rosa's incarnation of Magica De Spell is, however, far more limited as she usually only uses magic through magical objects and in The Quest for Kalevala, Magica acknowledges she cannot use magic without a wand.

=== Beliefs ===
Unlike other people who think the Number One Dime to be a lucky charm, Magica doesn't believe it to be the source of Scrooge's wealth, but Scrooge's wealth to be the source of the dime's powers, as she only tries to steal it because it's the first coin ever earned by the richest duck (or man) on Earth. It can be noticed when she steals the dime but gives it back when she realized she somehow caused the dime to lose such status. Examples of such stories are "Of Ducks and Dimes and Destinies", when she travels in time to steal the dime in the very same day Scrooge earns it and gives it back after realizing that by preventing Scrooge from owning the dime, she would turn it into a coin that never belonged to him, or "A Little Something Special", when she teams up with Flintheart Glomgold and the Beagle Boys in a plan made by Blackheart Beagle. She gives the dime back after realizing Scrooge wouldn't be the richest man on Earth after the Beagle Boys steal his money. In Carl Barks's "Ten-Cent Valentine", it's revealed she believes the dime must stay in one piece until she finally melts it or the spell won't work. Huey, Dewey, and Louie trick Magica into thinking it was destroyed by a meat grinder.

Magica believes she is the disciple of the ancient sorceress Circe.

== Family ==
A lot of Magica's relatives appear in Italian stories.

- Granny De Spell, Magica's grandmother
- Minima De Spell, her niece
- Matilda, Magica's teenager cousin
- Adelia, Magica's fairy cousin

=== DuckTales familiars ===
The 1987 DuckTales series introduces Magica's brother Poe (voiced Frank Welker), who was transformed into a non-anthropomorphic raven while maintaining his ability to speak. Although Magica has various transformation spells at her disposal, she is unable to return Poe to his original form. In Poe's debut episode, "Send in the Clones", Magica explains that she needs the power of Scrooge's Number One Dime to restore Poe. His name is a reference to Edgar Allan Poe.

In the 2017 DuckTales series, Poe is voiced by Martin Freeman. Appearing in a flashback in the episode "The Life and Crimes of Scrooge McDuck!", Poe ruled a village alongside his twin sister Magica, keeping her in check. After Scrooge came to their village, he angered Magica and caused her to accidentally turn Poe into a raven. Lacking the knowledge to turn Poe back, she begged Scrooge to help her, but he refused, leading to Poe flying away. Magica attempted to find Poe, but was unable to, causing her hatred against Scrooge.

In "Magica's Magic Mirror" she mentions her great-grandmother Tragica (Italian for 'tragical').

The 2017 DuckTales reboot also introduces Magica's "niece" Lena (voiced by Kimiko Glenn) – who is eventually revealed to be a magically created shadow creature and Magica's spy. During the series' first season, Lena meets Webby Vanderquack in order to gain access to Scrooge's Number One Dime so Magica can regain her corporeal form, but Lena befriends Webby and later sacrifices herself to save her from Magica. During the second season, Webby manages to restore Lena, allowing her to exist independently of Magica. She is also revealed to have access to Magica's powers, which initially scare her due to the possibility of becoming her. With the help of her friends, Lena overcomes her fears and uses her powers for good.
