= The Second-Richest Duck =

- Story code: W US 15-02
- Story: Carl Barks
- Ink: Carl Barks
- Date: February 2, 1956
- Hero: Uncle Scrooge
- Pages: 20
- Layout: 4 rows per page
- Appearances: Scrooge McDuck; Donald Duck; Huey, Dewey and Louie; Flintheart Glomgold (1st)
- First publication: Uncle Scrooge #15; September 1956

"The Second-Richest Duck" is an Uncle Scrooge comic book story written and illustrated by Carl Barks in February 1956. It features the first appearance of Flintheart Glomgold.

== Plot ==
The story starts when Scrooge McDuck tries to know where was his nephew going. Donald says he's going to buy an ice cream soda, much for the dismay of Scrooge, who tries to convince Donald to invest the money rather than spending it. Scrooge shows Donald his Number One Dime and the nephew notices a string attaching it to one of Scrooge's pockets. Scrooge says he also saves string and takes Donald to the Money Bin to show him the benefits of saving money. Donald still prefers a soda, so Scrooge gives up and goes to the park to find a newspaper (he's too stingy to buy one).

A two-day-old issue points a South African mine owner, named Flintheart Glomgold, as the new richest duck in the world and describes his net worth as over one multiplujillion and nine obsquatumatillion. Scrooge can't accept the idea of someone being richer than him, so he checks his fortune and learns his net worth also surpasses one multiplujillion and nine obsquatumatillion. It's: "one multiplujillion, nine obsquatumatillion, six hundred and twenty-three dollars and sixty-two cents".

Upon learning he's still not a second-class zillionaire, he goes to South Africa to meet Glomgold and check on his title as the world's richest duck. He takes Donald and his nephews along with him stating that, if he loses, he'll need them to carry him. With a list of all of his possessions and his string ball, Scrooge and co. take one of his ships to Africa. In the ship, Scrooge finds a piece of string and tries to put it on his ball, but it already belongs to another ball, whose owner gets very angry.

At Glomgold's headquarters, our heroes learn he has his own Money Bin, almost like Scrooge's (the biggest difference being that Scrooge's has a dollar sign and Flintheart's has a pound sign). At Glomgold's office, he "welcomes" them with a cannon, which Scrooge regards as a copy of his hospitality. Scrooge identifies himself and says he'd sent a telegram, but, since Scrooge doesn't pay for the messages he sends and Flintheart doesn't pay for the ones he receives, Flintheart didn't know he was coming. Flintheart lets Scrooge in anyway, claiming to know him from newspapers he found at the park. Scrooge learns Flintheart Glomgold is the duck he previously met at the ship. They start comparing wealth but, since they can't do it without losing temper, Donald and his nephews have to tie them up.

After a long night, Scrooge and Flintheart remain tied (in both ways) except for their string balls. They come to an agreement that the one who keeps more string is the richest one. They go unrolling their balls through "the heart of Africa". Scrooge tells his family he agreed to this wild rally because they are five to protect his string ball, but Flintheart is alone. On the other hand, Flintheart is armed with a better knowledge of the territory. When Flintheart becomes exhausted, Scrooge offers him a cup of coffee, and Flintheart retributes by suggesting Scrooge to put his ball on a clay pile to keep it safe. Scrooge's coffee had a sleeping potion while the clay pile is an ant-hill.

The next morning, Flintheart wakes with the upper hand (i.e. the bigger ball, but the race goes on). To make things worse for Scrooge, Flintheart pours syrup on Scrooge's ball, attracting more ants. Scrooge tries to take the ball to a river, Flintheart points out one, but Scrooge doesn't believe him. It turns out that Flintheart knew Scrooge wouldn't trust him anymore. Scrooge's ball was now small enough to be kept within his top hat, which came in handy next night to protect it from locusts, while Flintheart wasn't so lucky.

The next morning, some natives start a grass fire to keep the locusts away, causing Flintheart to run away and the others to follow him. While the fire cannot reach them, it scares all the animals into stampeding. The ducks climb a tree for protection, and Scrooge shakes Flintheart's branch trying to drop his ball (with the title of richest duck at stake, he's not so above dishonesty), although he stops when scolded by Dewey. A rhinoceros hits the tree, causing Glomgold's ball to fall and be destroyed by a bird. Scrooge was so distracted laughing he failed to notice another bird grabbing his ball. In the end, the remaining balls were very small and they seem to end tied, but Scrooge shows the string attached to the Number One Dime, making him the champ. Scrooge now begins talking to Donald about the joy of saving money, while Donald still prefers a soda as his nephews were carrying a defeated and depressed Flintheart Glomgold back to home.

== See also ==
- List of Disney comics by Carl Barks
- The Carl Barks Library
