= Bob Gregory (comics) =

American comics artist

- Born: Robert P. Gregory; October 20, 1921 Los Angeles, California, U.S.
- Died: December 5, 2003 (aged 82) Los Angeles, California, U.S.
- Areas: Writer, Artist
- Notable works: Donald Duck

Robert P. Gregory (October 20, 1921 – December 5, 2003) was an American comics artist and writer best known for writing and drawing hundreds of Gold Key comics starring the Disney comics character Donald Duck.

== Biography ==
Bob Gregory attended the Otis Art Institute and fought in World War II before working as a technical illustrator for an aircraft manufacturer. He began submitting art sketches to Western Publishing, for which he began freelancing on a steady basis in 1958 — first as a writer, then as a writer-artist both writer and artist — on many of Western's talking animal comics, including the Donald Duck comics produced under license by Dell and Western's Gold Key Comics.

Gregory produced hundreds of Disney comics stories for many publications, including Donald Duck, Daisy Duck's Diary, Junior Woodchucks, Uncle Scrooge, Walt Disney's Comics and Stories, Walt Disney's Christmas Parade, and Brazil's Zé Carioca.

He introduced the Billionaires Club of Duckburg, where Scrooge McDuck is a member, in the story The Christmas Cha Cha (Dell Giant #26, Nov 1959), written by Gregory and illustrated by Carl Barks. He started doing Aristocats stories in the 1970s, when he also penciled most issues of Daisy and Donald, co-starring Daisy Duck.

His World War II memoirs, Letters from the South Pacific, was published in 1996.

The official cause of death was listed as pneumonia.

Gregory's daughter, Roberta Gregory, is also a cartoonist, best known for her character Bitchy Bitch.
