= Donald Duck universe =

Fictional universe involving Donald Duck and related Disney characters

Donald Duck
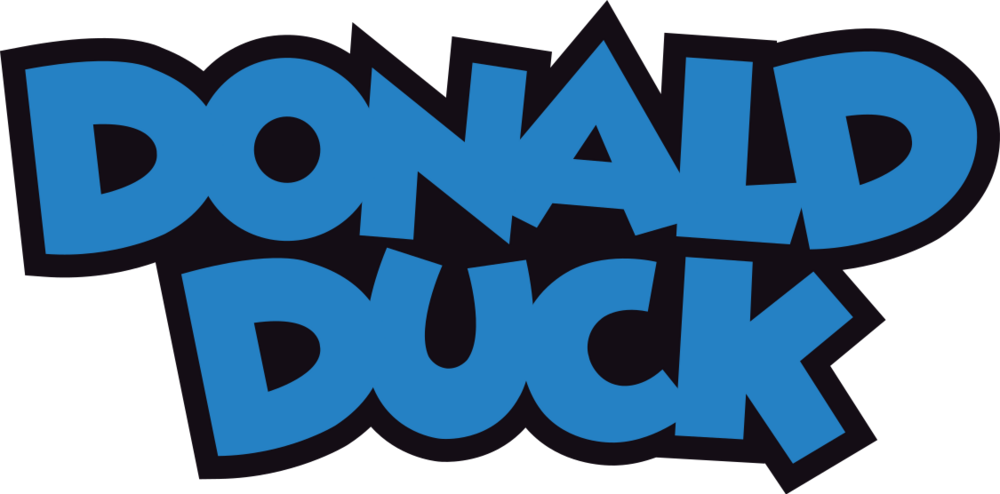
- The logo used by Disney to promote the Donald Duck franchise
- Created by: Walt Disney; Dick Lundy; Carl Barks (expansion)
- Original work: The Wise Little Hen (1934)
- Owner: The Walt Disney Company
- Years: 1934–present

Print publications
- Comics: Donald Duck in comics
- Comic strip(s): Donald Duck in comic strips

Films and television
- Film(s): Saludos Amigos (1942); The Three Caballeros (1945); DuckTales the Movie: Treasure of the Lost Lamp (1990)
- Short film(s): Donald Duck film series (1934–1961)
- Animated series: Donald Duck Presents (1983–1992); DuckTales (1987–1990); Darkwing Duck (1991–1992); Donald's Quack Attack (1992–2002); Quack Pack (1996); DuckTales (2017–2021); Legend of the Three Caballeros (2018)

Games
- Video game(s): List: Donald Duck's Playground (1984); Donald's Alphabet Chase (1988); Donald The Hero (1988); DuckTales (1989); The Lucky Dime Caper Starring Donald Duck (1991); Quackshot (1991); World of Illusion Starring Mickey Mouse and Donald Duck (1992); DuckTales 2 (1993); Deep Duck Trouble Starring Donald Duck (1993); Donald Duck no Mahō no Bōshi (1995); Disney's Magical Quest 3 Starring Mickey & Donald (1995); Donald in Maui Mallard / Maui Mallard in Cold Shadow (1995); Donald Duck: Goin' Quackers (2000); Donald Duck Quest (2006); Duckburg P.D.: Donald on Duty (2007); Donald Duck Quest Deluxe (2007); Donald Duck Chaos of the Road (2008); Phantom Duck (2008); DuckTales: Remastered (2013)

Miscellaneous
- Theme park attraction(s): Donald's Boat (1993–2023); Gran Fiesta Tour Starring The Three Caballeros (2007-present)
- Related universe: Mickey Mouse universe
- Due to the vast filmography of Donald Duck and related characters, this infobox does not exhaustively cover all works in this franchise.

The Donald Duck universe is a fictional shared universe which is the setting of stories involving Disney cartoon character Donald Duck, as well as Daisy Duck, Huey, Dewey, and Louie, Scrooge McDuck, and many other characters. Life in the Donald Duck universe centers on the city of Duckburg and is a part of the larger Mickey Mouse universe. In addition to the original comic book stories by Carl Barks, the Duckburg cast was featured in Little Golden Books, television series such as DuckTales (1987–1990), Darkwing Duck (1991–1992), and the DuckTales reboot (2017–2021), and video games such as DuckTales (1989), QuackShot (1991), Goin' Quackers (2000), and DuckTales: Remastered (2013).

"Donald Duck universe", sometimes called Duckverse or Scrooge McDuck universe, are unofficial terms used by Disney, but are sometimes used by fans. Disney comics artist/writer Don Rosa has also used the terms Barks Universe and Italian Duck Universe to describe different versions of history. According to Carl Barks, the comic book creator of Scrooge McDuck, Duckburg, and its original cast of characters and themes (who also developed Donald Duck and created Daisy Duck and Huey, Dewey and Louie for the early Donald Duck cartoons) — "Now we're beginning to read about Batman's universe, the Spiderman universe. All of those guys had their own universe, and so the ducks have their own universe." Barks adds, "Whenever I wrote the script and it was drawn by some other artist ... it came out looking so different, it didn't look like it belonged in the duck universe .. .Didn't look as real, or I use the word, 'sincere'. You couldn't tell whether the guy who drew it was really interested in turning out a nice product or not."

The core Duckverse family dates back to the golden age of American animation, generally introduced in Disney shorts, weekly newspaper comics, or comic books of the period as supporting characters for Donald Duck, who premiered in 1934 in The Wise Little Hen (but was mentioned as a friend of Mickey's as early as 1931). Donald's nephews, Huey, Dewey, and Louie, debuted in 1937 in a comic strip adaptation of an in-production film, Donald's Nephews. Daisy Duck, Donald's on-again-off-again girlfriend premiered in 1940, in Mr. Duck Steps Out. Grandma Duck also appeared in 1940, as a character in the comic strip. Scrooge McDuck, the family's elderly uncle and "richest duck in the world", was created in 1947 by Carl Barks for the comic book story Christmas on Bear Mountain.

== Comic books ==
While Donald's cartoons continue to be shown in the United States and around the world, his weekly and monthly comic books enjoy their highest profile in many European countries, especially Italy, Sweden, Denmark, Norway, Finland and Iceland, but also Germany, the Netherlands, and Greece. Most of them are produced and published by the Italian branch of the Walt Disney Company in Italy (Disney Italy) and by Egmont in Denmark, Norway, Finland and Sweden. In Germany, the comics are published by Ehapa which has since become part of the Egmont empire. Donald comics have also been produced in The Netherlands and France. Donald also has been appeared in Japanese comics published by Kodansha and Tokyopop.

According to the Inducks, a database about Disney comics worldwide, American, Italian and Danish stories have been reprinted in the following countries. In most of them, publications still continue: Australia, Austria, Argentina, Belgium, Brazil, Bulgaria, Canada, China, Colombia, Croatia, Czech Republic, Denmark (Faroe Islands), Egypt, Estonia, Finland, France, Germany, Greece, Guyana, Hungary, Iceland, India, Indonesia, Israel, Italy, Japan, Latvia, Lithuania, Mexico, the Netherlands, Norway, Philippines, Poland, Portugal, Romania, Russia, Saudi Arabia, Slovakia, Spain, Sweden, Thailand, Turkey, the United Kingdom, the United States, and the former Yugoslavia.

== Other media ==
Scrooge McDuck appeared in the 1960 Disneyland Records LP, Donald Duck and His Friends, in a plot that involved Donald and the Beagle Boys. With the exception of Scrooge's brief cameo in The Mickey Mouse Club opening theme, this marked the first appearance of a Barks-created character in a medium other than the comics and story books. Later, in 1963, the Beagle Boys played a role in Chipmunk Fun, an LP that also mentioned Scrooge.

Most of the characters have appeared in the 1980s Disney cartoon series DuckTales. Disney's Darkwing Duck series is nominally set in the separate DuckTales universe, in a metropolis called St. Canard, although aside from sharing the denizen Launchpad McQuack, and a few crossover episodes involving Gizmoduck, there is no interaction. Much of the DuckTales and all of the Darkwing Duck material do not appear in Barks' comics, as the two TV series were created decades after Barks's active years as a comic artist. Later, a few characters would be the main characters in the show Quack Pack.

However, in the magazine Disney Adventures, there was a five-part crossover/storyline titled "Legend of the Chaos God" which began with TaleSpin, and continued with Chip 'n Dale Rescue Rangers, Goof Troop, and DuckTales, then concluded with Darkwing Duck.

Duckburg was the setting of the 1987 animated series DuckTales. The cartoon's version of Duckburg was based loosely on the comics' version. Duckburg appeared in the 1990s animated series Quack Pack. In Quack Pack, Duckburg was populated almost entirely by human beings, with Donald, Daisy, and Donald's nephews as the only anthropomorphized animals that usually appeared. Moreover, the Money Bin is nowhere to be seen. Duckburg was the setting for one of the three initial levels of the video game Quackshot and also for the second level of the video game Donald Duck: Goin' Quackers.

Duckburg was also used for the setting of Mickey's Birthday land (later Mickey's Starland) at Walt Disney World's Magic Kingdom from 1988 to 1996. It even included Grandma Duck's Farm and a statue of Cornelius Coot, though it was more of a rural town than a burgeoning metropolis. The connection to Duckburg was removed as the land was renovated in 1996 to become Mickey's Toontown Fair. However, the Cornelius Coot statue remains.

In the 2017 version of DuckTales many elements of the Duck universe from the comics of Don Rosa and Carl Barks were used, alongside elements of others Disney stories (including the original 1987 DuckTales TV series, Darkwing Duck, TaleSpin, Chip 'n Dale Rescue Rangers, Quack Pack, Goof Troop and others). They were brought together into one common global storyline in the manner of the Marvel Cinematic Universe.

== Characters ==
Donald Duck and his maternal uncle Scrooge McDuck received nearly equal exposure in comics. (The reduced emphasis on Donald in the 1980s version of DuckTales was largely due to a Disney mandate that forbade its nascent television division from using major characters from the Golden Age of Animation, including Donald and Daisy. In the 2017 reboot, however, Donald appears as a main character.) Other primary characters include Donald's three young nephews Huey, Dewey, and Louie, and girlfriend Daisy Duck.

Several secondary characters have also achieved star status in certain publications, such as Grandma Duck, Donald Duck's grandmother; Gladstone Gander, Donald Duck's incredibly lucky cousin; Gyro Gearloose, an inventor who is often patronized by Scrooge; and Ludwig Von Drake, a knowledgeable professor. Scrooge also has several enemies, such as the Beagle Boys, a gang of robbers and escaped prisoners; Magica De Spell, an Italian sorceress; and South African Flintheart Glomgold and English-American John D. Rockerduck, both rival business men of Scrooge.

Some characters have appeared alongside Donald primarily in animation, such as chipmunks Chip 'n' Dale (Chip an' Dale, Toy Tinkers) and Humphrey the Bear (Rugged Bear, Grin and Bear It), as well as Mickey Mouse (The Dognapper, Magician Mickey), Goofy (Polar Trappers, Frank Duck Brings 'Em Back Alive), and Pluto (Donald and Pluto, Window Cleaners), who are more often associated with the Mickey Mouse universe.

== Fictional locations ==
=== Duckburg ===
Duckburg /ˈdʌkbɜːrɡ/ is the fictional city, located in the fictional U.S. state of Calisota, that serves as the home of Donald Duck, Scrooge McDuck, Huey, Dewey, and Louie, Daisy Duck and most of their supporting cast. Duckburg was first mentioned in Walt Disney's Comics and Stories #49 in 1944, and was created by Carl Barks.

The city is populated by various anthropomorphized animals, with dogs, different birds (including ducks, geese and chickens) and pigs as the most dominant ones. The mayor of the city is often depicted as a pig, whose name most of the time goes unmentioned and is referred instead by readers as the Pig Mayor. However, in some stories the office of mayor is held by various dog characters.

The size and structure of Duckburg varied in the works by Barks: it was adjusted to better fit the story he wanted to tell; it could vary from a small town to a medium-sized city, to a bustling metropolis. Later writers and artists adhere to this tradition recurrently. In one specific story by Barks, Monsterville (1961), Duckburg was even transformed into a futuristic city by Gyro Gearloose, however it proved that the citizens were not ready for the high level of technology that the new city provided. Thus the city was turned back to its old city structure.

In comic writer Don Rosa's stories, Duckburg and the state of Calisota is located on the West Coast of the United States, though Carl Barks himself and other writers often leave the city's location more vaguely defined. However, in Don Rosa's The Life and Times of Scrooge McDuck, the author alludes to where exactly he has situated Duckburg: "I won't bother to say precisely where I situated Duckburg and Calisota on America's west coast… but if you get out a good map and compare the coastline, you'll see that I stuck the old gold-prospector's adopted hometown directly across the bay from a very appropriately named actual city." Knowing how Don Rosa used gags, it is likely that this city would be Eureka, California (Eureka meaning 'I found it'!). This fits with the river and a large forest south of Eureka. In the DuckTales episode "Double O' Duck", a map is shown which shows Duckburg as being located somewhere in Virginia or North Carolina.

There are no references to the governor, legislature, Capitol, etc., of Calisota in any of the many stories about Duckburg. However, Duckburg seems to have its own governor, if it is not a sort of city-state. In more than one story a "Duckburg embassy" has been shown, which would place it outside the US at a diplomatic level. In the story Treasure of Marco Polo (Uncle Scrooge #64, 1966) by Carl Barks, the Duckburg embassy displays a flag of Duckburg, which consists of a white duck over a green field. However, in the Don Rosa story "His Majesty, McDuck" (Uncle Scrooge Adventures #14, Gladstone Aug. 1989) Scrooge gains a short-lived independence from the United States for Killmotor Hill, thus placing Duckburg within the United States.

The most prominent landmark in Duckburg is Scrooge McDuck's Money Bin, a giant building sitting on Killmotor Hill (formerly known as Killmule Hill) in the center of town. The money bin contains both office space, Scrooge's private living quarters and, most famously, three cubic acres of money, the results of Scrooge's lifetime of business and treasure-seeking adventures. Another major landmark in some stories is a large statue of Duckburg's founder, Cornelius Coot.

Duckburg is a major center for Space exploration, mainly operated and overseen by Gyro Gearloose, and has had expeditions to the Moon, Mars, Venus, the Asteroids, and more remote parts of the Galaxy. The city also features a sea port and is in proximity of a large forest called the Black Forest and to several mountains, the most notable being "Old Demon Tooth", usually depicted as a towering pointed peak leaning slightly to the side. The main river of the city is the Tulebug River, first mentioned in The Money Well (1958) by Carl Barks, and it is located near Killmotor Hill.

Duckburg is home to Yarvard University (a play on the universities of Harvard and Yale), an institution more notable for its athletic teams than for its academic achievements. It also has had international students, like the bey of El Dagga from Egypt, who is mentioned in Yarvard's first appearance; Donald Duck and the Mummy's Ring by Carl Barks from 1943. One of the things the bey learned at the university was that mummies do not eat. Duckburg is also the home of the Billionaires Club of some of which Scrooge McDuck, John D. Rockerduck and, according to some stories, Flintheart Glomgold are influential members. Duckburg also has a Ritz Hotel, first mentioned in Carl Barks' story Turkey with All the Schemings (Walt Disney's Comics and Stories #148, 1953) at which Scrooge McDuck had a business meeting with Donald Duck; who was disguised as the Duke of Baloni, the World's Second-Richest Duck at that time. In the same story Scrooge later buys the Ritz Hotel and he still owns it in Don Rosa's story Attaaaaaack! (2000).

Located near Duckburg is a farm owned and run by Grandma Duck, a direct descendant of Cornelius Coot and Donald's paternal grandmother. Donald's cousin Gus Goose also lives on Grandma's farm as a farmhand. The farm is often a gathering site for various Duck family holiday celebrations.

In other languages, Duckburg (for example Duckstad in Dutch, Entenhausen in German, Ankeborg in Swedish, Rațburg in Romanian, Andeby in Danish, or Patópolis in both European and Brazilian Portuguese) is not only home of "the Ducks", but Mickey Mouse and friends live there too. This has occasionally been implied also in English-language publications, as when Super Goof is referred to as "Duckburg's greatest hero" in a poster seen in the initial panel of the 1973 story Galactic Gourmet (Super Goof #27, Gold Key Comics). The story moreover pits Super Goof against the Beagle Boys, normally portrayed as living and operating in Duckburg.

==== History ====
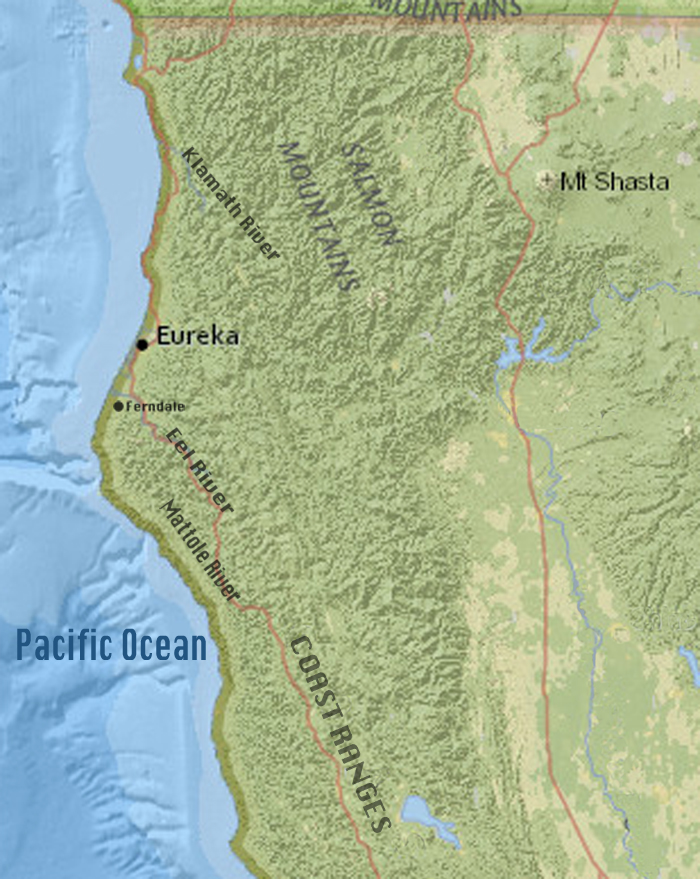
The unofficial Calisota map shown on the left indicates the location of Duckburg. The map resembles a map of Northern California (right), with Duckburg corresponding to a coastal area in Humboldt County near the city of Eureka, located on Humboldt Bay, California.

In the comics by Don Rosa, Duckburg was a fort built on Killmule Hill on June 17, 1579, by British explorer Sir Francis Drake in the area he named Nova Albion, in what would later become the state of Calisota. It was originally known as "Fort Drakeborough". In the year 1818, during the Spanish colonization of California (1697–1821), the fort had been handed over by its departing British occupants to the visiting hunter and fur trader Cornelius Coot, who Americanized the British name of the fort to "Fort Duckburg". "Drake" means a male duck, while "borough" and "burg" are synonyms. Cornelius Coot turned the old fort into a trading post for fellow traders and hunters, and their families. Eventually a small town grew around the fort on top of Killmule Hill. In Carl Barks' story The Day Duckburg Got Dyed (1957), it is revealed that Cornelius Coot at some point in Duckburg's history managed to pipe mountain water into the town. During the American Civil War, a decisive battle was fought on top of an unnamed hill in Duckburg, led by the Duckburgian General Stonewall Duck. It is not known on which side the city fought, but with General Stonewall Duck being based on the real-life Stonewall Jackson, it can be assumed they fought for the Confederacy. However, the real-life state of California, in which the fictional state of Calisota is located according to Don Rosa, was a Unionist state, making Duckburg a more likely member of the Union.

Duckburg remained a quiet, small town until the arrival of wealthy businessman Scrooge McDuck. He had bought the old fort and the hill from fellow prospector Casey Coot, a descendant of Cornelius Coot, during the Klondike Gold Rush in 1899. Scrooge proceeded to construct his famous Money Bin on the location, which would eventually cause McDuck an incredible variety of problems and dilemmas. The first one was caused by the Junior Woodchucks, who were squatting in the site and using the old fort as their headquarters, even though they did not have legal title to it. The dispute led to a small war in 1902, involving the United States marines and navy, led by then President Theodore Roosevelt. Eventually however, the construction of the Money Bin, and Scrooge's establishment of various businesses in and around Duckburg, caused Duckburg's population to swell, and turned the small town into a bustling city and a global financial centre within a few decades.

=== Calisota ===
Calisota /ˌkælɪˈsoʊtə/ (Note: The pronunciation is derived from the blending of those of "California" and "Minnesota".) is a fictional U.S. state, created by Carl Barks in his story The Gilded Man (Four Color #422). Duckburg is among the cities located there, as well as Goosetown, a traditional rival of Duckburg, and Mouseton.

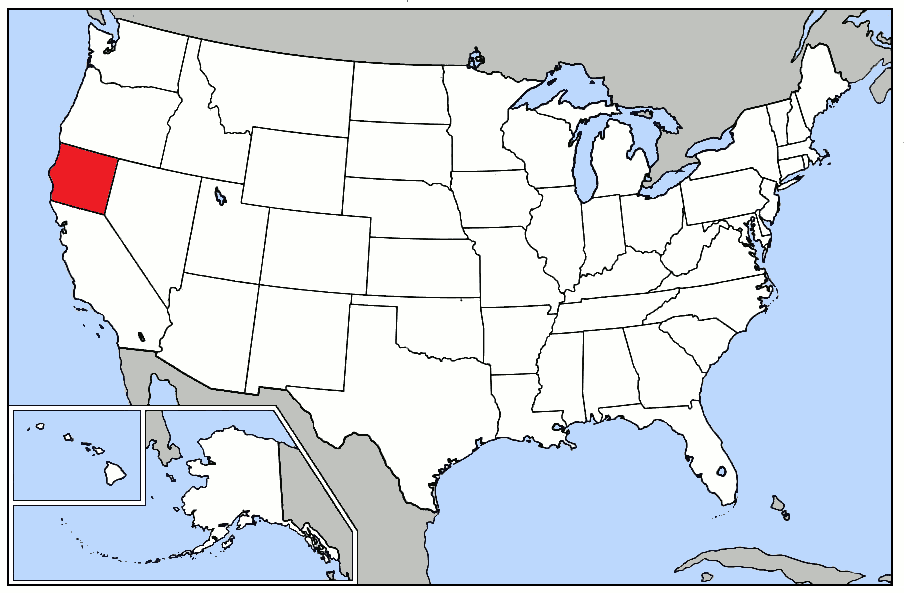
The location of Calisota as suggested by Don Rosa

Although it has many fictional elements and a variable climate, Calisota is probably synonymous with Jefferson, being roughly equivalent to Northern California. Duckburg is located north of San Francisco, with a map in Don Rosa's The Life and Times of Scrooge McDuck showing Calisota corresponding to the part of California north of the 39th parallel.

The name is a blend of California and Minnesota, supposedly to allow all kinds of weather or climate in the stories, although Calisota has very little in common with the latter (a state in the Upper Midwest, far from the ocean) and Northern California's regional weather is variable enough by itself.

=== Brutopia ===
Brutopia (a blend of brute and Utopia) is a fictional country appearing in several Donald Duck stories. It was created by Carl Barks in the story A Cold Bargain from 1957. Brutopia is a hostile country, aiming for world domination. It hence is clearly a caricature of the Soviet Union. In the Duck universe, Brutopia occasionally attempts to steal Scrooge's money so as to devastate the American economy, and to fund the creation of doomsday weaponry. Its national coat of arms has been shown either as a dagger or the hammer and shackles.

Whether Brutopia is a stand-in for all of the USSR, or just for part of it, varies with the story. Sometimes parallels to Russia are drawn directly. Don Rosa has suggested that Brutopia might instead represent the eastern part of Siberia.

The language of Brutopia often looks somewhat Slavic. On some occasions it is written in Cyrillic script. On the other hand, Brutopians seem to speak perfect, non-accented English; and other stories show English language texts being used by Brutopians.

In 1957, Brutopia's military spending budget amounted to one trillion dollars plus all the kitchen sinks of its happy people (a number that on closer inspection turned out to be five). Scrooge McDuck outbid the Brutopian government by paying one trillion dollars and six kitchen sinks for a sample of the recently discovered substance of bombastium.

=== Money Bin ===
The Money Bin is the building where Scrooge McDuck stores the portions of his money he earned by himself. Carl Barks invented the "money swim" in his story A Financial Fable (1950), followed by the "Money Bin" in the story Terror of the Beagle Boys (1951). In Barks' earlier stories, interchangeably with the name Money Bin, the building's official name was the McDuck Building, which was only used on facade signs. Eventually however, the name was discontinued in the later stories by Barks and subsequent writers and artists.

While the first stories showing the Bin treated it as if it had just been built, later continuity established that Scrooge had built the Money Bin in 1902 after having traveled around the world to make his fortune, mostly through prospecting and the establishment of various businesses. Scrooge's favorite pastime is to dive off a springboard into his money and swim through it. In most comic books stories, Scrooge lives at the Money Bin in his private quarters on the top floor, with the rooms often filled with large amounts of money. Because of Scrooge's frugality he has at times even made his own furniture and architecture out of his money; like using moneybags as chairs or using stacked paper bills as stairs to reach high places. The Money Bin also has a worry room in which Scrooge paces around in circles, which has caused a circular depression in the floor, to worry and ponder about hardships that has befallen him. The worry room was first mentioned in Carl Barks' story The Secret of Atlantis (Uncle Scrooge #5, 1954).

The traditional location of the Money Bin is on top of Killmotor Hill which in turn lies atop a fault line which would prove catastrophic in the event of an earthquake, and this earthquake occurred in the story Land Beneath the Ground! (1956) by Carl Barks.

The Money Bin is the victim of repeated assaults by Scrooge's enemies who try to steal his money, such as the Beagle Boys, who are after the bulk of Scrooge's money, and Magica DeSpell, who is after Scrooge's "Number One Dime", the first dime Scrooge ever earned. To protect against these attempted break-ins, Scrooge has installed the greatest security system in the world, which includes Gizmoduck in the DuckTales TV-Series, to thwart any thought of even trying to intrude onto the premises.

Barks defined the volume of money contained inside as "three cubic acres", but the exact meaning of a "cubic acre" left to the reader to interpret, since an acre is a measure of area, not length. Taken literally, a cubic acre would be a 6-dimensional space of 82,653,950,016,000 ft^{6}, i.e. feet to the sixth power. Taken as an acre that is raised to a cube with each side an acre, it would be around 9 091 379 ft^{3}. A series of blueprints created for the Scrooge McDuck story "The Beagle Boys vs. the Money Bin" by Don Rosa state that the Money Bin is approximately 127 feet (39 m) tall, and 120 feet (37 m) wide. In the story, said blueprints are accredited to an architect named Frank Lloyd Drake, who is based on the real-life architect Frank Lloyd Wright.

The Money Bin also contains various valuable artifacts like the Golden Fleece, the Crown of Genghis Khan, the Crown of the Mayas, the Candy-Striped Ruby and the Goose Egg Nugget. According to Carl Barks' story The Fabulous Philosopher's Stone (Uncle Scrooge #10, 1955) Scrooge also owned the Philosopher's Stone at one point, but it was later confiscated by the International Money Council as it could devastate the economy because of its capability to turn base metals into gold.

The Danish and Norwegian names for "the Money Bin" are Pengetanken and Pengebingen, respectively, and these have become a regular word in these languages for a large amount of money or cash.

Russell W. Belk mentions the Money Bin in Material Values in the Comics: A Content Analysis of Comic Books Featuring Themes of Wealth, where he remarks that Scrooge's "childish fascination with money", where he takes pleasure in diving and swimming in the Money Bin, might account for Scrooge not being portrayed as a villain. Penelope Fritzer in the article Scrooge McDuck: Postmodern Robber Baron considers it possible for the Money Bin to symbolize the entire Disney empire.

The Money Bin in the DuckTales 2017 reboot is given a total redesign. Here it is depicted as a large tower situated on an island in the waters near Duckburg, connected to the city via a bridge, and visible directly from Scrooge's bedroom window. It is perceived as a costly architectural fancy by Scrooge's board of directors, though Scrooge candidly claimed its deranged staff being let go would cause a larger danger. Aside from storing his money, this incarnation of the Money Bin (somewhat emptier due to Scrooge's costly search for the lost Della Duck) also serves as the corporate headquarters of McDuck Industries and the location of Gyro Gearloose's lab.

=== Glomgold's bin ===
Flintheart Glomgold also owns a money bin, located near Limpopo Valley in South Africa. Glomgold's bin substitutes the dollar sign ($) that appears on Scrooge's with a pound sign (£), as the South African pound was the currency of South Africa until 1961. The preference for the pound sign can also be explained by Glomgold's heritage, which puts him as a citizen of South Africa with British blood, whereas Scrooge embraced America despite his pure Scottish blood.

=== Millionaires' club ===
The Millionaires' club (sometimes called the Billionaires' club) is a prominent gentlemen's club in Duckburg, with its premises located in a stately mansion. The club first appeared in the 1959 story The Christmas Cha Cha, written by Bob Gregory and drawn by Carl Barks. Membership of the club is exclusive, with the minimum requirement being owning at least a million dollars.

Scrooge McDuck, Flintheart Glomgold and John Rockerduck are all members of the club, along with several other millionaires. Although Scrooge is clearly the wealthiest man in Duckburg, he is not the speaker of the club nor holds any special position above the other members. A repeating scene is Scrooge arriving at the club to catch up on the daily newspapers, as he is too stingy to buy copies himself. His favourite refreshment at the club is plain tap water as it is the cheapest the club has to offer. Whenever Scrooge meets his rival Rockerduck at the club, the two end up in an argument.

The speaker of the club often holds contests requiring spending excessive amounts of money and displaying a flamboyant millionaire lifestyle. Although Scrooge hates these contents because of the excessive spending, he is always forced to take part, in order to maintain his membership and status in the club.

== Recurring elements ==
=== Number One Dime ===
The Number One Dime (sometimes also called Lucky Dime in some games) is the first coin that Scrooge McDuck ever earned (or, according to some stories, produced). The Number One Dime first appeared in the story The Round Money Bin, created by Carl Barks and first published in Uncle Scrooge #3 (September, 1953). In this story, the dime is so old that it has become thin as a razor blade and allows Scrooge to cut binding ropes and escape from the Beagle Boys. In later stories, it is insinuated that the dime brings good luck to Scrooge and has helped him become a rich man. In some stories, he instantly starts losing money whenever the dime is no longer in his possession. In fact, in some series, Scrooge is so attached to the dime that he becomes hysterical, to the point of losing his mind, whenever he loses possession of the dime.

It is never made clear whether the dime actually brings good luck, or if Scrooge merely believes in it so much that he is distressed and makes bad decisions whenever he no longer has his dime. Since Barks never actually said that it was because of the coin that Scrooge was the richest duck in the world, Don Rosa, after various informational exchanges with Barks, for a faithful production of The Life and Times Of Scrooge McDuck, clarified that the Number One Dime is not actually an amulet, and that this vision was just a myth. The Number One Dime is just a sentimental object that happens to be the first coin Scrooge received for his work. Rosa made clear, also, that Scrooge made his fortune working hard and being honest. This point is heavily reinforced in the DuckTales TV series where Scrooge tells his nephews about the value of hard earned cash.

The dime is a key plot point in practically every story featuring Magica De Spell, a character invented by Carl Barks, as the main villain. Magica believes that by stealing the first coin earned by the richest person in the world and melting it down to a magical amulet, she can gain the power of the ancient King Midas, so that everything she touches becomes gold and she can be rich beyond her wildest dreams. The fact that this will only work if the coin indeed belongs to the richest person in the world at the time, and is the first coin that person earned, is crucial, and is made into a plot point in some stories. However, the dime only has magical value because of these circumstances and not on its own. Magica once successfully stole the Dime while helping the Beagle Boys rob McDuck, stopping when she realized this would mean McDuck would no longer be the world's richest person, rendering the Dime worthless.

According to a comic story by Don Rosa, it is an 1875 Seated Liberty dime, but in a comic story written by Pat and Carol McGreal and drawn by Maximino Tortajada Aguilar, the last two digits have been swapped, making it an 1857 Seated Liberty dime.

Scrooge earned the dime in 1877 in his hometown of Glasgow, when he started working as a shoeshine boy on his tenth birthday. Before that it belonged to Howard Rockerduck (the father of John D. Rockerduck). The customer who paid it to him, a ditch-digger called Burt, seemingly "cheated" Scrooge. In reality, Scrooge's father, Fergus McDuck, gave Burt the dime specifically for paying Scrooge for his services. Scrooge McDuck never learned that fact, although Fergus did reveal it to Scrooge's sisters Matilda and Hortense. Burt and Magica De Spell, who learned about this when she traveled in time to the day Scrooge earned the Dime, are the only other ones who know. McDuck kept it as a reminder not to be fooled again in the future. When he emigrated to the US three years later, he carried it with him. Scrooge still has the dime and keeps it on a pillow under glass because of its sentimental value. Donald Duck, Huey, Dewey, and Louie, and Gladstone Gander among many others think it is really a lucky charm, but Scrooge himself rejects any claims beyond sentimentality.

=== The Junior Woodchucks ===
The Junior Woodchucks are the Scouting organization to which Huey, Dewey, and Louie belong. They have a uniform with a coonskin cap. The Junior Woodchucks were created by Carl Barks in 1951, in the story "Operation St. Bernhard" (Walt Disney's Comics and Stories #125). Later stories introduced a similar organization for girls, Junior Chickadees, to which Daisy Duck's nieces, April, May and June belong. The hallmark of the Junior Woodchucks is their spirited dedication to environmental protection and animal welfare, as well as the preservation of knowledge and the furtherance of science. They are also known for their exalted titles and ranks (Huey, Dewey, and Louie being promoted to become Ten-Star Generals in the 1952 story of the same name) and the awarding of buckets of badges, along with severe ideals as to decorum. In this way Barks poked gentle but pointed satire at aspects of the Boy Scouts.

=== Bombastium ===
Bombastium is a fictional chemical element. Its atomic number and atomic symbol are unknown. Bombastium is stated to be the rarest element in the world. Even though it is very coveted, its usage potential is not entirely known. One characteristic is that it tastes different every time you try it, and scientists eventually discovered that one atom of bombastium dropped into a barrel of water becomes one barrel of ice cream – a different flavor of ice cream each time. The element is orange-brown in color and is about the size of a soccer ball. To avoid evaporation, bombastium must be kept frozen.

The only piece of bombastium known to exist was found in the Belgian Congo, and it was soon after its discovery acquired by Scrooge McDuck in the 1957 story "A Cold Bargain" by Carl Barks, but at that time it was also heavily sought after by the hostile nation of Brutopia. Brutopia's military spending budget that year amounted to one trillion dollars plus all the kitchen sinks of its happy people. Scrooge McDuck therefore had to pay one trillion dollars plus six kitchen sinks to win the auction.

The element was also used for the 5-part DuckTales episode "Time is Money", which introduced Bubba the Caveduck. In this cartoon episode, bombastium is the fuel for one of Gyro Gearloose's inventions, a time traveling helicopter named the Millennium Shortcut. The bombastium itself must be kept frozen in order for it to be usable as fuel (a small freezer is equipped on board the Shortcut for this purpose). Otherwise, the Shortcut could not travel through time.

One of the treasures that can be obtained in the computer game DuckTales: The Quest for Gold is bombastium. Unlike the other treasures, bombastium is worth more than just money, as Gyro Gearloose can use it to build a matter transporter which takes away the risk of flying from place to place while having the possible downside of sending the player to a location they had not intended to go.

=== Squiggs ===
Squiggs are fairly small fish that are typically eaten "oolated". Squiggs were first mentioned in the Carl Barks ten-pager "Turkey Trouble" where, in one panel, a can of "oolated squiggs" can be seen as a background detail. Don Rosa later used the fish as a key plot element in the story "Oolated Luck".

Conserved oolated squiggs are fairly cheap and wholesome food but taste particularly bad, and smell worse. Donald Duck and Gladstone Gander once took part in a competition organized by a company producing oolated squiggs, where the grand prize was an ocean liner cruise. Donald won the grand prize and Gladstone won a year's supply of oolated squiggs.

== See also ==
- Donald Duck – the character in film and comics
- Huey, Dewey and Louie and The Junior Woodchucks
- Scrooge McDuck and the Clan McDuck
- Daisy Duck and the extended Duck family
- List of Donald Duck universe characters
- Donald Duck in comics – the story of his stories
- Disney comics – comic strips and books
- Inducks – Disney comics database
- Carl Barks – comic book creator
- Mickey Mouse universe
