= Beagle Boys =

Disney comics characters

The Beagle Boys
- Donald Duck characters
- The Beagle Boys in "The Mysterious Stone Ray" (1954) by Carl Barks
- First appearance: "Terror of the Beagle Boys" in Walt Disney's Comics and Stories #134 (November 1951)
- Created by: Carl Barks
- Voiced by: Dallas McKennon (Chipmunk Fun); Jack Angel and Will Ryan (Sport Goofy in Soccermania); Frank Welker, Chuck McCann, Peter Cullen, Terry McGovern and Brian Cummings (DuckTales (1987)); Jeff Bennett and Maurice LaMarche (Mickey, Donald, Goofy: The Three Musketeers); Eric Bauza (DuckTales (2017))
- Species: Dogfaces
- Gender: Male
- Significant others: Chihuahua Sisters (2010s comics; Raceworld)
- Relatives: Pa Beagle (father); Ma Beagle (mother); Beagle Brats (nephews); Blackheart Beagle (grandfather); Granny Beagle (grandmother); Great Grandpappy Beagle (great-grandfather); Penny Beagle (cousin)

The Beagle Boys are a group of cartoon characters created in 1951 by Carl Barks for the Donald Duck universe. They are a family clan of organized criminals who constantly try to rob Scrooge McDuck. Their introduction and first appearance was in "Terror of the Beagle Boys" (Walt Disney's Comics and Stories No. 134, November 1951), although in this story they only appear in the last frame and have no lines. They appear again in the next issue in a similar fashion, in The Big Bin on Killmotor Hill (Walt Disney's Comics and Stories No. 135, December 1951). Their next appearance, Only a Poor Old Man (Uncle Scrooge No. 1, March 1952), gave them a substantial speaking role and developed them as a collective character.

== The Beagle Boys in comics ==
=== Barks/Rosa universe ===
The Beagle Boys are dogfaces (a term given to cartoon characters with human-shaped bodies and dog-like heads) that were originally created by Carl Barks and made their first appearance in the 10-page story "The Terror of the Beagle Boys" (WDC #134) that was first published in November 1951. Although the Beagle Boys are only shown very briefly on the last page of this story, it is implied that Scrooge has known about them for a long time. The Beagle Boys are usually depicted as a gang of about three to ten members or more depending on the story, who are identical in appearance and personality. They wear black bandit masks to hide their identities and on their turtleneck sweaters, most often being orange or red, they have their prison number signs. The Beagle Boys are often characterized to be very crude, boastful, aggravating, greedy, and self-centered – among themselves, however, they are very loyal and have a strong connection of sibling camaraderie. Although, on some occasions, they have shown irritation toward each other, often relating to someone making a mistake or saying something that does not fit in with the consensus, like one Beagle Boy's (176–167) overly fondness of prunes; a weakness that proves to be the Beagle Boys' downfall in some stories. 176-167's love for prunes makes him the only Beagle Boy with a unique characteristic.

The first story to feature the Beagle Boys in a major role is Only a Poor Old Man (Four Color Comics No. 386, March 1952, retroactively regarded as Uncle Scrooge No. 1), which serves as a template for virtually all future Beagle Boys appearances, and establishes them as a serious threat to Scrooge's fortune. In the same story, they are called "the most awful gang of crooks in the country" by Donald Duck. This most often manifests with them cleverly coming up with various or elaborate schemes to try to break into and steal from Scrooge McDuck's well-secured Money Bin. On occasion they are even shown to have highly intellectual capacities, as they are able to earn academic degrees in various fields. Among individual Beagle Boys, some of these degrees include: cranial encephalography, psychology, chemistry, metallurgy, and electropyrotechnology. These were often seen by the government as attempts at rehabilitation, but in reality, it was a charade by the Beagle Boys to use their newly acquired skills for robberies. They are also experts at trickery, including disguises, and animal training; like using cormorants as aerial bombers, as well as having a large arsenal of various weapons, explosives, or machines. When needed, they have been shown to be able to use force or threats to get what they want. With all things considered, however, the Beagle Boys are often attributed not to be as clever as they think they are, often gullible to tricks and offensives themselves. Also, most of their appearances ends with them getting arrested. They are usually imprisoned in Duckburg prisons or Sing Sing, but they have also been jailed in other prisons as well. The Beagle Boys are, however, proud of their criminal background and are never willing to live their lives in accordance to the law.

The Beagle Boys' goal in stealing Scrooge McDuck's money is to create a life of luxury for themselves. On the few occasions when they managed to steal the money, they are shown to spend in excess, purchasing and extravagant and ostentatious mansions or living on a paradise island near Hawaii. They have also shown proneness for taking over the world when being presented with such an opportunity, like in Carl Barks' story The Mysterious Stone Ray (Uncle Scrooge No. 8, 1954).

Blackheart Beagle and his three sons, from "The Fantastic River Race" (1957).

The Beagle Boys are most often shown without an established leader, instead acting as a very coherent and homogeneous unit, and only giving orders between each other interchangeably when needed. However, sometimes the Beagle Boys are led by their grandfather, Blackheart Beagle, who has the prison number 186–802. The Blackheart character originates from two characters created by Carl Barks: Blackheart Beagle, a riverboat pirate from The Fantastic River Race (Uncle Scrooge goes to Disneyland #1, 1957), and Grandpa Beagle, who appeared in The Money Well (Uncle Scrooge #21, 1958). It was Don Rosa who later combined the character into one in chapters 10 and 11 of The Life and Times of Scrooge McDuck. Also, according to Rosa, Blackheart Beagle semi-retired in 1947, following a failed attempt at robbing Scrooge's Money Bin. In The Life and Times of Scrooge McDuck, Scrooge first met The Beagle Boys in his Mississippi riverboat days, circa 1880. Those Beagle Boys included Blackheart Beagle and his three sons.

Scrooge first met the modern third-generation Beagle Boys during Christmas 1947, which was when he first met his three grandnephews, along with his nephew Donald Duck for the second time. Since then, the Beagle Boys have been a constant threat to Scrooge's Money Bin.

Grandpa Beagle from "The Money Well" (1958).

The third generation of the Beagle Boys, like their fathers, were never given any personal names by Carl Barks but was instead referred to by their prison numbers, which starts with "176-" and ends on a permutation of the numbers 1, 6, and 7, which allows six different combinations. This tradition was first established in Barks' The Menehune Mystery (Uncle Scrooge No. 4, December 1953), while the Beagle Boys in previous stories, and some of them in The Menehune Mystery, instead had their prison numbers as "176-" followed by random digits (except in their first story, where they have no prison numbers). However, in a few of his later stories, Barks did not continue this tradition and used random numbers again instead. But subsequent writers and artists by default still mostly uses the 1, 6, and 7 combinations for the Beagle Boys in the modern comic books. The Beagle Boys also have their prison numbers tattooed on their chests. According to Don Rosa's The Beagle Boys vs. The Money Bin (2001), the Beagle Boys have been known by their prison numbers since their childhood, and they do not even know their real names themselves. Their parents do know their real names, but demand a bribe from their sons to let them know. Also according to that story, Blackheart Beagle does not remember his sons' names.

Carl Barks used to include the words "Beagle Boys, Inc." on their shirts under their numbers, which was later deleted in reprints. It can either be assumed that this was a reference to Murder, Inc., a name for organized crime groups in the 1930s and 40s; or that they are a criminal organization very similar to a real business, but neither is certain. In one comic, the Beagle Boys have a worldwide organization known as Beagles International, in which the Beagles have spies in different countries around the world.

In most of Carl Barks stories, the number of Beagle Boys was not exact but instead they were depicted as being ambiguously numerous, with their number of members varying from story to story. However, if one would count all of the different combinations of the Beagle Boys' prison numbers that was used in the comic books by Carl Barks, the Beagle Boys would seem to consist of at least 36 members. In The Menehune Mystery, Scrooge mentions thirty Beagle Boys. Don Rosa, however, constantly uses seven Beagle Boys in his stories, but instead of using a random number Rosa always hides one prison numbers behind something to avoid two Beagle Boys having the same number.

The Beagle Boys usually operate on their own, but collaborated with Magica De Spell in the 1963 Barks story Isle of the Golden Geese, and again in the 1997 Don Rosa story A Little Something Special where they also teamed up with Flintheart Glomgold. In The Status Seeker (Uncle Scrooge No. 41, 1963) by Carl Barks, they are shown to be part of a labor union called the "Burglars, Thugs, and Pirates Union", at Local No. 6^{1}/_{2}.

=== Other comics ===
The Beagle Boys #3 (1966).

From 1964 to 1979 the Beagle Boys had their own comic book title, The Beagle Boys, published by Gold Key Comics, which continued from 1979 to 1980 under the name The Beagle Boys Versus Uncle Scrooge.

In all comics, the individual Beagle Boys are referred to by their prison numbers as per Barks's convention. In addition to Barks's and Rosa's claim that the Beagle Boys do not know their names, the Beagle Boys-centric comic Being Donald Duck (2003) by Olaf Moriarty Solstrand adds that the Beagle Boys do not know their mother's name either, only her number. The Beagle Boys' prison numbers are indicated on the tags seen on the chests of their distinctive orange or red turtleneck sweaters. The original depictions by Barks in American comics most often showed the Beagle Boys with orange sweaters. European comics recolored these same Barks drawings to show Beagle Boys in red sweaters. Subsequent European comic depictions of the Beagle Boys by artists other than Barks also showed them in red sweaters, as did the DuckTales cartoons.

Grandpa Beagle as seen in the Italian comic books.

In later years, especially in Europe, they appear in the comics as a trio, alongside cousins and other relatives of various talents as spin-off characters. Most notably are the Beagle Brats, the Beagle Boys' three preteen nephews created by Tony Strobl and Steve Steere in That Motherly Feeling (Walt Disney's Comics and Stories No. 299, 1965). They mirror criminal versions of Scrooge's three nephews and have the prison numbers 1, 2, and 3. Another prominent relative is Intellectual-176 (or I-176, for short), the Beagle Boys' cousin who acts as the brains of the Beagle clan. He wears a mortar-board cap and glasses over his black bandit mask and has the prison number "I-176". I-176 was created by Pete Alvarado and first appeared in The Crown Jewel Job (The Beagle Boys No. 7, 1967).

The Beagle Boys generally live in a small tumbledown hide-out in Duckburg; in 1970s American-produced stories, their pet cat Ratty often lived there as well. In the Italian stories, they live in a travel trailer and are sometimes accompanied by their pet dachshund, Ottoperotto, who shares their criminal mindset, but is often overcome with Ottoperotto's constant, voracious appetite.

Sometimes they team up with other villains such as Magica De Spell, Black Pete, Mad Madam Mim, or hire out their services to Flintheart Glomgold, John D. Rockerduck, and Jolly Ollie Eiderduck. During these occasions, they continue to operate out of their own interests rather than their employers'.

Many other authors use a character purely based on The Money Well version as the Beagle Boys' grandfather. In particular, Italian authors use a "Grandpa Beagle" who differs from Blackheart in being much skinnier and constantly smoking a pipe. Unlike his grandsons, he is highly intelligent and appears as their cunning and capable leader, hatching devious plans. The Italian version of Grandpa Beagle has the word "GRAZIA" (which means "pardon" in Italian) where his prison number should be. When his stories are translated for the US, "GRAZIA" is replaced with "186–802", his prison number in Western stories.

Sometimes the Beagle Boys antagonize Super Goof, Mickey Mouse, or some other characters from Walt Disney's comic books.

=== Ottoperotto ===
His favorite activity is eating sausages.

Ottoperotto – univerbation of otto per otto (Italian for '8×8') – is the Beagle Boys' pet dachshund in Italian comic book stories. The joke about him being a dachshund is that in Italy the Beagle Boys are referred to as "Banda Bassotti", which means "Dachshund Gang". Like his masters, Ottoperotto wears a bandit mask, a shirt, and a cap, marked with the number 64 (the result of the 8×8 multiplication). The Beagle Boys frequently take Ottoperotto along on their robberies, to act as a guard dog and to reach spaces too small for the Beagle Boys themselves. However, the plans are often spoiled by Ottoperotto's constant, voracious appetite. Whenever Ottoperotto smells food, he abandons everything else to get to eat it.

== The Beagle Boys in animation ==
=== Sport Goofy in Soccermania ===
The Beagle Boys made their animated debut in the 1987 television special Sport Goofy in Soccermania, voiced by Jack Angel and Will Ryan. Similar to the comic books, the Beagle Boys are depicted as identical in both appearance and behavior, though lacking the prison numbers of their comic counterparts.

=== DuckTales ===
A Beagle family photo, as seen in DuckTales. From left to right: Burger, Baggy, Bouncer, Bigtime, Ma Beagle, Bugle, Bankjob, and Babyface.

On DuckTales, the Beagle Boys were given names and different personalities and almost all of them speak in New York accents. The usual character combination is Bigtime, Burger, and either Bouncer or Baggy, with Bouncer appearing more often in the first season and Baggy in the second. Their leader is usually Bigtime when Ma Beagle is not present. Sometimes one or two of them were swapped out with Bankjob, Babyface, or Bugle, and a few episodes featured the latter three as the trio of Beagles, with Bankjob filling in for Bigtime as the leader. Other known names are Bomber and Blitzkrieg. The letter B is the first initial of all Beagle Boys' handles except Megabyte, the brains of the bunch.

The Beagle Boys have many relatives who count each other as brothers and cousins: apart from Ma Beagle, there are re-imagined versions of the Beagle Brats (sons or nephews), as well as the Beagle Babes (a female counterpart).

The Beagle Boys make cameos in the Darkwing Duck episode "In Like Blunt", where they are among the villains bidding on a list of SHUSH's secret agents.

==== Ma Beagle ====
Ma Beagle, based on the real-life Ma Barker and the mystifications around her, was a new character created for DuckTales as the mother of the seven common Beagle Boys featured on the show, and the clan matriarch. She often smuggles hand grenades, chainsaws, and other tools in baked goods which easily pass prison security to help her sons escape from jail. Even when she is around, the Beagles never succeed because Scrooge McDuck and his nephews always outwit them. However, in most of the episodes she appears in (especially in the first season), she is able to avoid being arrested along with her sons; that way, she will be able to bust them out the next time she appears. In one episode, she pretended to be "married" to Scrooge so that she could steal his fortune, but her plans were thwarted by both him and his three nephews. With Ma, family always comes first – except when it comes to avoiding arrest. She was voiced by actress June Foray, who also voiced Magica De Spell. Character actress Margo Martindale voices Ma in the 2017 DuckTales series.

Ma Beagle first appeared in the episode "Robot Robbers", and since then she has become a recurring character. She appeared more frequently in the second season than in the first, however.

==== 1987 Series Beagles ====
There were many Beagle Boys on the 1987 original series, but the most common seven consisted of:

| Name | Placard Number | Characteristics |
|---|---|---|
| Bigtime Beagle | 167–671 | Bigtime is the second-in-command, being the leader of the group in absence of Ma Beagle, and is distinguished by being rather short for someone with the word "Big" in his name. He is the smartest of the seven main Beagles and often has to correct his companions whenever they get something wrong or mishear his directions. Voiced by Frank Welker. |
| Burger Beagle | 761-176 or 176–761 | As his name suggests, Burger has a large appetite, although it's for more than just hamburgers. He has a habit of talking about food no matter if any of the others are actually talking about it. His prison tag is often seen with a bite taken out of it. He also is not very bright. Incidentally, his comic counterpart (who had the second placard number) is known for a special appreciation for prunes and his curious culinary tastes (i.e. catsup on ice cream or peanut butter pizza with gravy). Voiced by Chuck McCann. |
| Bouncer Beagle | 716-167 | Distinguishable for his teeth, one of which is missing, Bouncer is the second strongest Beagle after Bankjob. In earlier episodes, before their names were well established, Bouncer sometimes had Burger's voice and vice versa. He appeared much less frequently in the second season, most likely because he was in jail as mentioned by Ma Beagle in one episode. In the GameCube version of the video game Donald Duck: Goin' Quackers!, during the Beagle Boys boss battle, when Donald Duck fights Bigtime, Burger, and Bouncer, all three of them have the same number on Bouncer's shirt. Voiced by Chuck McCann. |
| Baggy Beagle | 617–716 | Baggy is distinguishable for his silly grin as well as his loose-fitting clothing. His prison tag is often seen with a fold in one of the corners. He is the least intelligent and the most sloppy of the Beagle Boys. He appeared more frequently in the second season and somewhat replaced Bouncer as third beagle in the usual trio of himself, Bigtime, and Burger. Voiced by Frank Welker. |
| Bankjob Beagle | 671-167 or 614-167 | Bankjob is the third-in-command of the Beagle Boys as he usually leads the group in episodes where Ma Beagle and Bigtime are not present. He is the largest of the seven main Beagles (by comparison, he is about the same size as Launchpad) and the strongest. In the second season, he had no speaking roles and rarely appeared. Voiced by Peter Cullen. |
| Bugle/Bebop Beagle | 671–761 | Bugle, or Bebop, depending on the episode, is the beatnik member of the Beagle Boys (despite the fact that the comic Beagle with this character trait corresponds by placard to Babyface), and even dresses in a jazz-styled outfit. Had no speaking roles in season two. Voiced by Brian Cummings. |
| Babyface Beagle | 176-167 | As his name suggests, Babyface is the youngest of the primary Beagles, as evidenced by the fact that his own clothing matches those of a baby, including a propeller beanie in place of the usual hat. He's also rather short yet slightly taller than Bigtime. In spite of this, his voice, provided by Terry McGovern (who also voices Launchpad), sounds more manly than that of Burger. Strangely, one particular comic story in Disney Adventures prominently featured Babyface, wherein he infiltrated Webby's class. But he looked different from how he did on the show, and he also had a conscience, as he ended up rebelling against his brothers during a field trip to Scrooge's Money Bin. (He still ended up being arrested along with his brothers, though.) Like Bankjob and Bebop, his role was reduced to non-speaking cameos in the second season. |

Other Beagle Boys consisted of:

- Megabyte Beagle is the most intelligent engineering genius of the clan, and the only one whose name does not begin with the letter "B". He appeared in the five-part serial Super DuckTales, in which he made a remote control to control GizmoDuck. He has a habit of confusing his companions with his technobabble, forcing them to make him "say it in Beagle talk!". Ma Beagle comments that paying his college fees with stolen money paid off. His voice was done by Frank Welker.
- Bomber Beagle looks a lot like Bankjob in that he has a similar jawline and is very large. He is a skilled pilot, and more intelligent than most of the regular Beagles. He appears only in the episode "Top Duck" (episode 16) where he was voiced by Robert Ridgely.
- The Canadian Beagle Boys are Canadian relatives of the Beagle Boys that worked with Flintheart Glomgold in "Ducky Mountain High" and live in the Ducky Mountains.
  - Backwoods Beagle is a small beagle about the size of Bigtime and Babyface, and the only Beagle who wears a full mustache. He has a strong Canadian accent and is the twin brother of Binky Beagle and Bacon Beagle. Backwoods wears a Davy Crocket-like trapper's outfit as opposed to the normal jailhouse outfit of the Beagle Boys. He is also the only person who is able to understand Bacon Beagle. Backwoods Beagle is voiced by Danny Mann.
  - Binky Beagle is probably the only Beagle Boy who is never seen speaking. He is roughly the same size as Baggy Beagle, wears a lumberjack outfit, and has a full beard.
  - Bacon Beagle is the only Beagle Boy who is not a Beagle. Bacon is in fact a pig. When Glomgold asked how he could be a Beagle Boy, Backwoods explains that Bacon had "a bad case of the swine flu as a child". Bacon cannot speak, but his oinks and grunts are, instead, translated by Backwoods Beagle. His vocal effects are provided by Frank Welker.
- Cameo Beagles:
  - Baritone Beagle is a cousin of the Beagle Boys that appears in the Disney Adventure comic "Mrs. Beakley's Secret Love". He can perform voice mimicry and briefly fell in love with Mrs. Beakley.
  - Bombshell Beagle is one of the Beagle Boys who Ma Beagle tends to favor as seen in "Beaglemania". He appears to be older than the other Beagle Boys and wears military clothing.
  - Bulkhead Beagle
  - Buns Beagle
  - Bankroll Beagle is one of the Beagle Boys who was mentioned in "Beaglemania".
  - Brainstorm Beagle is one of the Beagle Boys who was mentioned in "Beaglemania".
  - Butterball Beagle is a cousin of the Beagle Boys who accompanied them in their attack on the Money Bin in "A Drain on the Economy".
  - Bullseye Beagle is a cousin of the Beagle Boys who accompanied them in their attack on the Money Bin in "A Drain on the Economy".
  - Boomboom Beagle is a cousin of the Beagle Boys who accompanied them in their attack on the Money Bin in "A Drain on the Economy". He and Banzai used explosives to attack the Money Bin.
  - Banzai Beagle is a cousin of the Beagle Boys who accompanied them in their attack on the Money Bin in "A Drain on the Economy". He and Boomboom used explosives to attack the Money Bin.
  - Buckaroo Beagle is a cousin of the Beagle Boys who accompanied them in their attack on the Money Bin in "A Drain on the Economy". He, Beanball, and Blitzkrieg get caught in the Anti-Beagle System's net.
  - Beanball Beagle is a cousin of the Beagle Boys who accompanied them in their attack on the Money Bin in "A Drain on the Economy". He, Buckaroo, and Blitzkrieg get caught in the Anti-Beagle System's net.
  - Blitzkrieg Beagle is a cousin of the Beagle Boys who accompanied them in their attack on the Money Bin in "A Drain on the Economy". He, Buckaroo, and Beanball get caught in the Anti-Beagle System's net.
  - Bifocal Beagle is a cousin of the Beagle Boys who accompanied them in their attack on the Money Bin in "A Drain on the Economy". He gets caught by two robotic hands posing as trees.
  - Bumpkin Beagle is a cousin of the Beagle Boys who accompanied them in their attack on the Money Bin in "A Drain on the Economy". He gets caught in one of the traps.
  - Butterball Beagle is a cousin of the Beagle Boys who accompanied them in their attack on the Money Bin in "A Drain on the Economy". He gets caught in one of the traps.
  - Bully Beagle is a Beagle Fear Spirit that appeared in "Nothing to Fear" and does not dress like the other Beagle Boys. It is not explained how he is related to them. He is voiced by Pat Musick.
  - Bearnaise Beagle is a richer version of Burger and member of the Blueblood Beagles. He is voiced by Chuck McCann.
  - Bicep Beagle is a richer version of Bouncer and member of the Blueblood Beagles. He is voiced by Chuck McCann.
  - Bonaparte Beagle is a richer version of Bigtime, with his name apparently referring to his "Napoleonic" personality. He is voiced by Frank Welker.

The episode "Once Upon a Dime" featured an earlier generation of the Beagle Boys during the early days of Scrooge McDuck in the 20th Century. They consist of:

- Butch Beagle (voiced by Chuck McCann)
- Wild Bill Beagle (voiced by William Callaway)
- An unnamed Beagle (voiced by Michael Rye)

The Beagle Boys also have female cousins called the Beagle Babes that appeared in "The Good Mudduhs" where they kidnapped Webby Vanderquack and hold her for a ransom of jewelry. They consist of:

- Bouffant (voiced by Jo Anne Worley) is the leader of the Beagle Babes and the more intelligent of the duo. She has a large hairdo that enables her to smuggle in different items.
- Boom-Boom (voiced by Victoria Carroll) is the ditsy member of the Beagle Babes. She is not to be confused with Boomboom Beagle (see above).
- Babydoll (voiced by Susan Blu) is the youngest member of the Beagle Babes who is a tomboy.

The Beagle Boys have younger nephews called the Beagle Brats that appear in "Take Me Out of the Ballgame".

==== 2017 Series Beagles ====
In the 2017 reboot series, the Beagle Boys are divided into several smaller gangs with Ma Beagle serving as the leader of all of them, as revealed in the episode "The Beagle Birthday Massacre!", and are all voiced by Eric Bauza. In the season two episode, "The Golden Armory of Cornelius Coot!", it is revealed the feud between them and Scrooge McDuck originated from a battle between Duckburg's founder Cornelius Coot and the Beagles of that time. The latter attempted to attack a fort the former was holding, only to be tricked into retreating when Coot used popcorn makers to make the Beagles think he was everywhere at once. The fort would go on to become Fort Duckburg and strike up the feud for control of the land it was on. In a flashback depicted in the episode "The Life and Crimes of Scrooge McDuck!", the Beagle Boys under Pappy Beagle temporarily took control of Fort Duckburg after stealing its deed, but Scrooge took it back from them, leading to a young Ma Beagle taking control of the gang from her father.

The Beagle Boys line-up consists of:

- Ma Beagle – The ringleader of all of the Beagle Boys and owner of their junkyard home. Contrary to her 1987 counterpart, she shows much less respect or affection for her sons.
- The Original Classics – A trio of Beagle Boys consisting of Bigtime Beagle, Burger Beagle, and Bouncer Beagle, all of whom debuted in the episode "Daytrip of Doom!" They depart drastically from their 1987 counterparts in that Bigtime is dumber than his original counterpart and has delusions of grandeur; Burger is tall, skinny, and mute; and Bouncer is now the same size as the 1987 Bankjob.
- The Glam Yankees – A trio of Colonial Yankee/glam rock-themed Beagle Boys.
- The Déjà Vus – A trio of French-themed Beagle Boys whose name provides a gag, as they are introduced by Ma Beagle three times, similar to real world Déjà vu.
- The 6th Avenue Meanies – A trio of thuggish, brutish Beagle Boys led by Bad Attitude Beagle.
- The 6th Avenue Friendlies – A trio of well-mannered, dapper Beagle Boys led by Benevolent Beagle.
- The Longboard Taquitos – A trio of daredevil Beagle Boys who ride on skateboards, wear wingsuits, and speak with "surfer dude" accents.
- The Tumblebums – A trio of Gothic circus Beagle Boys who primarily whistle instead of talking and consist of a muscular clown, a stilt-walker, and an acrobat. According to the other Beagles, they are rumored to be adopted.
- The Ugly Failures – A trio of unattractive, incompetent Beagle Boys consisting of Botched Job Beagle, Bungle Beagle, and Bottle Beagle.
- Black Arts Beagle – A Beagle Boy who works as a stage magician and differs from the others in that he has gray fur instead of tan. He was the one who accompanied Ma Beagle to Scrooge's birthday party where one trick he tried to do led to him unknowingly summoning the ghost of Duckworth.
- Broadway Beagle and Backfield Beagle – Two Beagle Boys who appear in the DuckTales comics with a movie director and football theme, respectively.
- Bomber and Butcher Beagle – Two ice hockey playing Beagles that also appear in the DuckTales comics.
- Grandpappy Beagle – Ma Beagle's grandfather who most notably stole the deed to Duckburg before Scrooge won it from him in an arm-wrestling match and crashed the first annual McDuck Enterprises Christmas party.
- Grandpappy's Gang – A trio of Beagle Boys consisting of Bankjob Beagle, Babyface Beagle, and Bugle Beagle that accompanied Grandpappy Beagle in crashing Scrooge McDuck's Christmas party.
- Pappy Beagle – Ma Beagle's father who led the Beagle Boys in taking Fort Duckburg until Scrooge defeated him in an arm-wrestling match and Ma took control of the gang in response.
- Big Tech Beagle - A technologically literate Beagle Boy similar to Megabyte Beagle from the 1987 series.

=== Mickey, Donald, Goofy: The Three Musketeers ===
The Beagle Boys appeared as Pete's henchmen in the film Mickey, Donald, Goofy: The Three Musketeers. There are only three Beagle Boys in the film, one of them noted for being short (however, unlike Big Time, he was not the leader but more or less the "idiot" of the group), with gray skin and black hoods. They decide to depose Princess Minnie so Pete could become king. They were shown to be much more dangerous compared to their original DuckTales counterparts. These Beagle Boys were collectively voiced by Jeff Bennett and Maurice LaMarche.

These versions of the Beagle Boys appear in the video game Kingdom Hearts 3D: Dream Drop Distance.

=== Mickey Mouse & The Wonderful World of Mickey Mouse ===
In the television series Mickey Mouse, the Beagle Boys appear in the episode "Sock Burglar" as part of the villains that Minnie interrogates, and in "Touchdown and Out" as part of the football team that Pete forms with them and Chernabog to play against Mickey, Donald and Goofy.

In the spin-off series The Wonderful World of Mickey Mouse, they appear in the episode "Keep on Rollin'" arriving with Pete and Ursula at the roller rink where Mickey and his friends always enjoy, being kicked out by the group of villains from the place, and later having to face them in a roller skating competition to get their meeting place back.

== See also ==
- The Daltons - A similarly organized band of comic strip criminal villains that were depicted as relatives of the real-life Dalton Gang.
