= The Don Rosa Library =

Collection of Don Rosa's Disney comics work

- The cover of the first volume of the series, Son of the Sun

Publication information
- Publisher: Fantagraphics Books
- Schedule: Biannual
- Format: Hardcover
- Genre: Funny animals Adventure
- Publication date: October 4, 2014 – November 13, 2018
- No. of issues: 10
- Main character(s): Scrooge McDuck, Donald Duck, Huey, Dewey, and Louie, Daisy Duck, Gyro Gearloose, Gladstone Gander

Creative team
- Written by: Don Rosa
- Artist: Don Rosa
- Colorist(s): Rich Tommaso, Kneon Transitt
- Editor: David Gerstein

Uncle Scrooge and Donald Duck: The Don Rosa Library is a series of books published by Fantagraphics Books, collecting all of the Scrooge McDuck and Donald Duck comic book stories written and drawn by Don Rosa, originally published between 1987 and 2006. Following up Fantagraphics' Floyd Gottfredson Library and The Complete Carl Barks Disney Library, this series was launched in 2014, and completed with the tenth and last volume in late 2018.

Since 2017, Fantagraphics' The Don Rosa Library is being translated and published in Russia, Brazil, Poland and Italy by editors ACT, Editora Abril, Egmont and Panini Comics respectively. In June 2020, a translated edition for the German market was released, this one having minor editorial changes and adaptations compared to the Fantagraphics original library version and its previous translations.

== Background ==
In September 2013, Fantagraphics Books announced that they were to publish a complete library of Don Rosa's Disney comics scheduled to launch during the summer of 2014. This would not be the first time that Fantagraphics published work by Don Rosa; in 1981 they published his Don Rosa's Comics & Stories in two volumes, featuring Pertwillaby Papers and later also his Tagdenah in The Comics Journal.

In the end of July 2014, the first volume of the Don Rosa Library, titled The Son of the Sun premiered at San Diego Comic-Con; it was also stated that the first volume would get a retailer release in September later the same year. However, it was finally released on October 4, 2014.

== Format ==
The Don Rosa Library volumes are 8.5 × 11 inches (216 × 279 mm), making them a little bigger than the volumes of The Complete Carl Barks Disney Library measuring 7.5 × 10.25 inches (191 × 260 mm). The library consists of 10 volumes and represents a complete chronological collection of Rosa's Disney stories. The volumes were published in chronological order starting with Don Rosa's first Disney story: "The Son of the Sun" (1987), this volume was published in 2014.

The pages are mostly colored by Scott Rockwell, Erik Rosengarten, Rich Tommaso, Kneon Transitt, and Digikore Studios under the supervision of Disney expert David Gerstein and Gary Groth, with the artistic input of Rosa. Rosa has stated that he checks every page and panel offering valuable insight and assistance to the Fantagraphics team in restoring the stories as they were originally intended to be published.

The books are approximately 200 pages each containing about 160 pages of comics, with the remaining pages made up of supplementary material, which include comments on the stories by Rosa, story covers by the artist and a biography written by Rosa.

The volumes are sold separately with a suggested retail price of $30 each, but are also available in bundled sets by the pair in chronological order with a provided slipcase. The boxed sets had the suggested retail price at $50 and had therefore "a bargain price worthy of Scrooge McDuck himself!" according to the publisher. From 2014 to 2018, two volumes were published yearly. The boxed sets were introduced to the market in conjunction of the release of every evenly numbered volume.

== Recognition ==
- 2015
  - Volume one of the series, The Son of the Sun, is nominated for the Eisner Award in the category "Best Archival Collection/Project - Comic Books (at least 20 years old)".
  - Volume one of the series is also nominated for the Harvey Award in the category "Best Domestic Reprint Project".
- 2016
  - Volume three and four of the series are nominated for the Eisner Award in the category "Best Archival Collection/Project - Comic Books".

== Volumes and box sets ==
=== Volumes ===
Volumes
Volume & date	Title	Period	Page count	ISBN	Inducks link
1: 2014-10-04	The Son of the Sun	1987–1988	208	978-1-60699-742-0	DRL 1
2: 2014-11-16	Return to Plain Awful	1988–1990	216	978-1-60699-780-2	DRL 2
3: 2015-09-06	Treasure Under Glass	1990–1992	196	978-1-60699-836-6	DRL 3
4: 2015-11-09	The Last of the Clan McDuck	1992–1995	196	978-1-60699-866-3	DRL 4
5: 2016-06-06	The Richest Duck in the World	1993–1994	196	978-1-60699-927-1	DRL 5
6: 2016-10-22	The Universal Solvent	1994–1997	212	978-1-60699-961-5	DRL 6
7: 2017-07-25	The Treasure of the Ten Avatars	1995–1998	192	978-1-68396-006-5	DRL 7
8: 2018-01-09	Escape from Forbidden Valley	1997–1999	208	978-1-68396-053-9	DRL 8
9: 2018-07-24	The Three Caballeros Ride Again!	1999–2002	224	978-1-68396-102-4	DRL 9
10: 2018-11-13	The Old Castle's Other Secret	2002–2006	224	978-1-68396-134-5	DRL 10

=== Box sets ===
Box sets
Volume & date	Title	Period	ISBN
1: 2014-11-30	The Don Rosa Library Vols. 1 & 2	1987–1990	978-1-60699-781-9
2: 2015-11-09	The Don Rosa Library Vols. 3 & 4	1990–1995	978-1-60699-867-0
3: 2016-10-25	The Don Rosa Library Vols. 5 & 6	1993–1995	978-1-60699-962-2
4: 2018-01-09	The Don Rosa Library Vols. 7 & 8	1996–1999	978-1-68396-054-6
5: 2018-11-13	The Don Rosa Library Vols. 9 & 10	1999–2006	978-1-68396-135-2

== Related ==
Free Comic Book Day 2014

In December 2013 it was announced that Fantagraphics would participate in the Free Comic Book Day promotion campaign of May 2014 with a comic book issue showcasing the works of Don Rosa. The free issue was titled Uncle Scrooge and Donald Duck: A Matter of Some Gravity and featured the two Rosa stories A Matter of Some Gravity and The Sign of the Triple Distelfink.

The Complete Life and Times of Scrooge McDuck

After all ten volumes of The Don Rosa Library had been released and the series therefore had been concluded, Fantagraphics released in 2019 the two-volume hardcover series The Complete Life and Times of Scrooge McDuck, an edition collecting The Life and Times of Scrooge McDuck and a few other stories which while not strictly being part of that series had a strong connection to them. The featured stories had been collected over several volumes of The Don Rosa Library (volumes 1 and 4–10) as that series was chronologically arranged.

== Translated versions ==
=== Brazilian version ===
The Brazilian version is titled Tio Patinhas e Pato Donald - Biblioteca Don Rosa and was initially published by Editora Abril starting in September 2017 with each Brazilian volume corresponding to an American volume. The price of each Brazilian volume was R$79.90. In 2018, the publication was canceled just before the 6th volume, already announced, went into publication. In November 2019, Panini Brasil Ltda resumed the collection.

Volumes
Vol	Released	Title	Period	Page count	Published	ISBN	Inducks link
1	2017-09 / 2021-02	O Filho do Sol	1987–1988	212	Editora Abril / Panini	978-85-5579-226-7 / 978-65-5512-862-8	BDR 1
2	2017-10 / 2021-04	Volta a Quadradópolis	1988–1990	212	Editora Abril / Panini	978-85-5579-233-5 / 978-65-5512-958-8	BDR 2
3	2017-11 / 2021-06	O Tesouro na Bolha de Vidro	1990–1992	196	Editora Abril / Panini	978-85-5579-242-7 / 978-65-5982-234-8	BDR 3
4	2017-12	O Último Membro do Clã Mac Patinhas	1992–1995	196	Editora Abril	978-85-5579-244-1	BDR 4
5	2018-02	O Pato Mais Rico do Mundo	1993–1994	204	Editora Abril	978-85-6952-245-4	BDR 5
6	2019-11	O Solvente Universal	1994–1995	208	Panini	978-85-4261-695-8	BDR 6
7	2020-01	O Tesouro dos Dez Avatares	1995–1996	224	Panini	978-85-4262-858-6	BDR 7
8	2020-04	Fugindo do Vale Proibido	1997–1999	224	Panini	978-85-4263-060-2	BDR 8
9	2020-06	O Retorno dos Três Cavaleiros	1999–2002	230	Panini	978-65-5512-086-8	BDR 9
10	2020-09	Uma Carta de Casa	2002–2006	232	Panini	978-65-5512-444-6	BDR 10

=== German version ===
A German version of the series published by the German Egmont Comic Collection began its publication in June 2020. Compared to previous translations of the Fantagraphics version of the series, this German edition has some layout changes such as the story articles appear just after each individual story compared to previously all of these have been collected in the end of each volume. The MSRP for a single volume is €30, while 2-volume box sets are priced at €70 .

=== Italian version ===
The Italian version is published by Panini Comics under the title The Don Rosa Library – Zio Paperone & Paperino. It started in November 2017 and ended in June 2019, for a total of 20 paperback volumes, published monthly. Each American volume is divided into two Italian volumes, and the latter don't have titles. The prices of each Italian volume is €8.90.

Volumes
Volume & date	Period	Page count	ISSN	Inducks link
1: 2017-11-10	1987	140	9772532922006-70001	DRLI 1
2: 2017-12-10	1988	116	9772532922006-70002	DRLI 2
3: 2018-01-10 (Note: The date on the back of the cover mistakenly says 2017 instead of 2018)	1988–1989	116	9772532922006-80003	DRLI 3
4: 2018-02-10	1989–1990	116	9772532922006-80004	DRLI 4
5: 2018-03-10	1990–1991	116	9772532922006-80005	DRLI 5
6: 2018-04-10	1991–1992	116	9772532922006-80006	DRLI 6
7: 2018-05-10	1992–1995	116	9772532922006-80007	DRLI 7
8: 2018-06-10	1993	116	9772532922006-80008	DRLI 8
9: 2018-07-10	1993–1994	116	9772532922006-80009	DRLI 9
10: 2018-08-10	1994	116	9772532922006-80010	DRLI 10
11: 2018-09-10	1994–1997	116	9772532922006-80011	DRLI 11
12: 2018-10-10	1995	116	9772532922006-80012	DRLI 12
13: 2018-11-10	1996	116	9772532922006-80013	DRLI 13
14: 2018-12-10	1995–1998	116	9772532922006-80014	DRLI 14
15: 2019-01-10	1997-1998	116	9772532922006-90015	DRLI 15
16: 2019-02-10	1999	116	9772532922006-90016	DRLI 16
17: 2019-03-10	1999-2001	116	9772532922006-90017	DRLI 17
18: 2019-04-10	2001-2002	116	9772532922006-90018	DRLI 18
19: 2019-05-10	2002-2004	116	9772532922006-90019	DRLI 19
20: 2019-06-10	2004-2006	116	9772532922006-90020	DRLI 20

A second version, Don Rosa Library De Luxe, 10 hardback volumes similar to the Fantagraphics library, has been published from 2019 to 2022.

=== Polish version ===
The polish version is published by Egmont Polska. It started in December 2019. The price of one volume is PLN 69,99.

=== Russian version ===
The Russian version is published by ACT under the title Библиотека Дона Росы - Дядюшка Скрудж и Дональд Дак. It started in February 2017, with each Russian volume corresponding to an American volume. The price of each Russian volume is RUB 750.

Volumes
Volume & date	Title	Period	Page count	ISBN	Inducks link
1: 2017-02-07	Сын Солнца	1987–1988	208	978-5-17-100446-0	DRL 1
2: 2017-05-30	Возвращение в ужасную долину	1988–1990	216	978-5-17-101751-4	DRL 2
3: 2017-09-29	Сокровище под стеклом	1990–1992	192	978-5-17-102849-7	DRL 3
4: 2018-01-19	Последний из Клана Макдаков	1992–1995	192	978-5-17-102850-3	DRL 4
5: 2018-05-16	Самый богатый селезень в мире	1993–1994	192	978-5-17-107284-1	DRL 5
6: 2018-07-25	Универсальный растворитель	1994–1995	208	978-5-17-108615-2	DRL 6
7: 2018-10-02	Сокровище десяти Аватар	1996–1998	224	978-5-17-110546-4	DRL 7
8: 2019-01-14	Побег из Заповедной Долины	1997–1999	224	978-5-17-112178-5	DRL 8

=== Swedish version ===
Since September 2020 a Swedish translation of the work is published by Egmont Comics. A single volume is priced at 559 SEK.

=== Finnish version ===
The Finnish translation of the library is published by Story House Egmont. The first volume was published in 2021 and the series is expected to be concluded in 2025.

== See also ==
- The Complete Carl Barks Disney Library
- Walt Disney's Mickey Mouse (a.k.a. The Floyd Gottfredson Library)
