= Christopher Hjort =

Norwegian typographer and graphical designer

Christopher Hjort (born 15 December 1958) is a Norwegian typographer and graphical designer. In 1990, Hjort and three colleagues founded Gazette, which has grown into one of Norway's largest professional companies in the fields of graphical design, web design, modern typography, information, and corporate communication more generally. At Gazette, Hjort has been co-founder, co-owner, and currently works as advisor. He has also been actively involved in developing the company's Gazette Bok publishing group, which serves as an outlet for various publishing ideas that evolve through Gazette's different business connections. Through Hjort's connections and initiative, Disney artist Don Rosa used Gazette Bok for publishing his The Pertwillaby Papers and The Adventures of Captain Kentucky books.

Hjort is also a rock historian and researcher. In 2000, together with American Doug Hinman, he published Jeff's Book, an acclaimed annotated chronology of Jeff Beck's career, followed first in 2007 by Strange Brew: Eric Clapton and the British Blues Boom 1965–1970 and then by So You Want To Be A Rock'n Roll Star: The Byrds Day-by-Day 1965–1973. These books have also been edited, designed and laid out by Hjort. Of Strange Brew, Guitar Player magazine wrote that "If you’re into vintage British blues and rock, you need to add this masterpiece to your collection", while Mojo (magazine) stated that the book was "meticulously compiled...an info-freak's dream". Classic Rock (magazine) felt So You Want To Be A Rock'n Roll Star was "convincing and exhaustive, it’s the ideal accompaniment for working through (or even starting) your Byrds collection", while Record Collector wrote in its review that "this is an awe-inspiring work of scholarship".

In 2009, Hjort’s book on the Byrds was awarded a Certificate of Merit by the Association For Recorded Sound Collections Award for Excellence In Historical Recorded Sound Research.

Hjort has also worked as a semi-professional guitarist, and toured and recorded two albums with Bygg Band, Norway's first cajun and zydeco group. The band's second album was recorded in Crowley, Louisiana, in 1984, together with cajun and zydeco legends Link Davis Jr. (sax), Michael Doucet (fiddle), and Cleveland Chenier (rub board). Hjort's interests include collecting guitars and rock music literature.

== Bibliography ==
- Christopher Hjort and Doug Hinman (2000): Jeff's Book: A Chronology of Jeff Beck's Career, 1965–1980: From the Yardbirds to Jazz-Rock (Rock'n'Roll Research Press, ISBN 0-9641005-3-3; 256 pages, sold out)
- Christopher Hjort (2007): Strange Brew: Eric Clapton and the British Blues Boom 1965–1970 (Jawbone Press, ISBN 978-1-906002-00-8; 288 pages, more than a hundred photos)
- Christopher Hjort (2008): So You Want To Be A Rock'n'Roll Star: The Byrds Day-by-Day 1965–1973 (Jawbone Press, ISBN 978-1-906002-15-2; 336 pages, about a hundred photos)
