= The Kentucky Kernel =

Student newspaper of the University of Kentucky

- Type: Daily online, Special Sections Print Editions student newspaper
- Format: Tabloid
- Owner: Kernel Press Inc.
- Editor-in-chief: Sylvia Freire
- Founded: 1892
- Language: English
- Headquarters: 400 S. Limestone; Lexington, Kentucky 40508-0042
- Circulation: 8,000
- Price: Free
- OCLC number: 13363397
- Website: kykernel.com

The Kentucky Kernel is the student newspaper of the University of Kentucky.

The Kernel is distributed free on and around the University of Kentucky campus. It claims a circulation of 8,000 and readership of more than 30,000. Its sole source of revenue is advertising. It is issued in print during the spring and fall semesters and updated daily at kykernel.com.

== History ==
The Kentucky Kernel was preceded by several student newspapers, with the earliest dating to 1892. From 1908 to 1915, the University of Kentucky's student newspaper was called The Idea, but it became the Kentucky Kernel following a naming contest in 1915. The first issue produced under the Kernel name was published September 16, 1915. The paper had become an eight-page weekly by 1923, and it became a Monday-Friday daily newspaper in 1966. In 2023, the Kernel shifted focus to multimedia journalism by switching to print special sections and daily online publishing.

In 1972, the Kernel formally established its editorial and financial independence from the University of Kentucky administration.

In 2005, students started a competing satirical newspaper The Colonel, which was revived again in 2014.

== Operations and alumni ==
The Kernel operates out of Blazer Dining, which is located on North Campus and is also the home of the School of Journalism and Media. Prior to Blazer Dining, the Kernel has operated out of several buildings on the University of Kentucky's campus such as McVey Hall and the Grehan Building.

Several prominent journalists worked at the Kernel while they were students, including current New York Times National correspondent Michael Wines, former Associated Press Chief White House Correspondent Terence Hunt, former National Geographic photographer Sam Abell and former Chicago Tribune Washington correspondent William Neikirk.

Writer Bobbie Ann Mason also worked at the Kernel. The famous Disney writer and illustrator Don Rosa worked for the Kernel from 1969 to 1973. The Pertwillaby Papers were first printed in the Kernel, which inspired many of Rosa's later creations, including the Scrooge McDuck tales The Son of the Sun, Cash Flow, and The Last Lord of Eldorado.

== Controversies ==
On October 5, 2007, the newspaper published an editorial cartoon that was considered racially insensitive to some students. The cartoon depicted an African American being auctioned off to fraternities and sororities in an attempt by the cartoonist to depict racial divide in the fraternity system. The paper officially apologized the next day and the incident spawned a panel discussion on diversity.

== Awards ==
In 2025, the Kernel won its seventh straight General Excellence Award from the Kentucky Press Association. In 2006, 2008, 2015 and 2019 the Kernel won the National Pacemaker Award from the Associated Collegiate Press after having been nominated for several years.
