= The Barks/Rosa Collection =

The Barks/Rosa Collection is a series of prestige format comic books published by Gemstone Publishing containing adventure stories by Carl Barks and Don Rosa featuring Disney comics characters Uncle Scrooge and Donald Duck. Rosa produced many stories that were direct sequels of Barks' tales, and this series paired the original Barks stories with the Rosa sequels.

Three issues were published between July 2007 and September 2008, and a fourth was planned but never released by Gemstone. The contents of the planned fourth issue were later taken up and released by Boom! Studios in June 2011.

== List of volumes ==
Gemstone Publishing

- Uncle Scrooge Adventures – The Barks/Rosa Collection Vol. 1

Land of the Pygmy Indians (Barks) and War of the Wendigo (Rosa)

- Donald Duck Adventures – The Barks/Rosa Collection Vol. 2

Donald Duck's Atom Bomb, The Trouble With Dimes, Super Snooper (Barks), The Duck Who Fell to Earth, The Money Pit, and Super Snooper Strikes Again (Rosa)

- Donald Duck – The Barks/Rosa Collection Vol. 3

The Golden Helmet (Barks), and The Lost Charts of Columbus (Rosa)

Boom Studios

- Uncle Scrooge in The Mysterious Stone Ray (Barks) and Cash Flow (Rosa)
