= Iku-Turso (creature) =

Mythological creature

Iku-Turso (Finnish pronunciation: [ˈikuˌturso], "the eternal giant"; also known as Iku-Tursas, Iki-Tursas, Meritursas, Tursas, Turisas among others) refers to one or multiple giants in Finnish mythology. In the Kalevala, Iku-Turso is a malevolent sea monster.

The name Turisas is probably an early loanword from the Proto-Germanic *þurisaz 'giant'. In 1551, Mikael Agricola mentioned Turisas as the god of war: Turisas voiton antoi sodast 'Turisas brought victory in war'. There is no consensus among scholars if the multiple Tursas mentions in runic songs refer to one being or multiple different ones.

== In runic songs ==
A runic song speaks of the birth of "Old man Kave, Lord of the North, / Ancient eternal giant" (or "ancient iku-Turilas"). He is called the old father of Väinämöinen, and he grew tired of being in the womb and released himself with just a lift of his finger. He was born in full warrior gear with a sword and a saddled horse. In other sources, Väinämöinen is called a son of a giant named Kaleva, who has also been interpreted by researchers as a kind of primordial giant. A Forest Finnish song also calls iku-Turilas the one who freed the Sun and the Moon.

Another song mentions Meri-Tursas 'Sea Tursas' who impregnates Maiden of North Loviatar with waves when she is seeking relief for her pain in water. As a result, Loviatar gives birth to the diseases of the world. Another song is similar, but says that Meren Ukko Parkka Äijä made the Maiden of North pregnant, and Väinämöinen was born out of this and released himself from the womb in the same way as his father did in the aforementioned song.

In the Great Oak story, a trio of luonnottaret reap a meadow. A "fiery Tursas" comes from Pohjola and steals the hays, burning them and sowing the ashes at the gates of Pohjola. As a result, the Great Oak emerges, so big it blocks the Sun and the Moon from shining, and a hero must be found to cut it down.

== Interpretations ==
Tursas or multiple tursaat are connected to multiple epithets: partalainen 'the one who lives on the brink', or alternatively, 'the bearded one', Tuonen härkä 'the ox of Tuoni', tuhatpää 'thousand-headed', tuhatsarvi 'thousand-horned'. Fiery Turisas was sometimes said that he lived in Pohjola, but that may be because Pohjola was often perceived as the home of all evil. Sea Tursas is also mentioned as the "son of Äijö", a name which often refers to a demon or even the Devil.

According to Anna-Leena Siikala, it is likely that Turisas and Tursas were originally two different beings who got mixed with each other in runic songs. One song mentions "Iku-Turilas" as a great warrior and Väinämöinen's father, while others speak of "Meri-Tursas" and "Turilas" as malevolent giants. Siikala drew a connection between Kaleva, Iku-Turso/Tursas, and the Norse giants such as Ymir. Kaarle Krohn connected Ikiturso to Hymir and Ymir as well.

In the list of Tavastian gods by Mikael Agricola in 1551, Turisas is mentioned as the god of war: Turisas voiton antoi sodast 'Turisas brought victory in war'. It has been suggested that the god in the list is same as the Scandinavian god of war Tyr; however, this theory is not widely supported today.

Johannes Schefferus compared Turisas with Thor in his book Lapponia (1673). Ostrobothnian descriptions of the giant ("Turilas") that is Väinämöinen's father have been seen as references to a war chief. Scandinavian influence would also be stronger in Western Finland and Ostrobothnia as opposed to the more eastern areas (as Turilas itself is a Norse loan word). Christfried Ganander and Christian Erici Lencqvist specified the war god ("Turri-Turras") and sea giant ("Tursas" or "Meri-Tursas") as two separate beings, and Henrik Gabriel Porthan likely agreed. Later researchers have argued about whether the names refer to the same being or two different ones: Eemil Nestor Setälä and Uno Harva even changing their minds about the matter during their careers—to the opposite directions. Setälä saw Tursas as a water haltija.

In addition to the Proto-Germanic *þurisaz 'giant' explanation, Janne Saarikivi pointed out the possibility of a connection to an early name of Thor (*þunra-z), especially in the form of the name Turras, mentioned by Ganander. He did also say that this explanation wasn't without its problems, and the names could also be a contamination of both words.

In addition to Norse comparisons, 17th and 18th century researchers connected him to Mars. Martti Haavio, on the other hand, connected him to Apollo. In 1748, Christian Limnell in his thesis Schediasma historicum de Tavastia claimed that Turrisas had been a real life Finnish hero and successful leader who had been deified after his death. He also thought that Turrisas is the one the Icelandic Arngrímur Jónsson meant when claiming someone named Torro had once ruled over Finland.

In Nurmes, it's been recorded that Tursas meant a scary haltija which lives in a nest of red ants.

== In the Kalevala ==
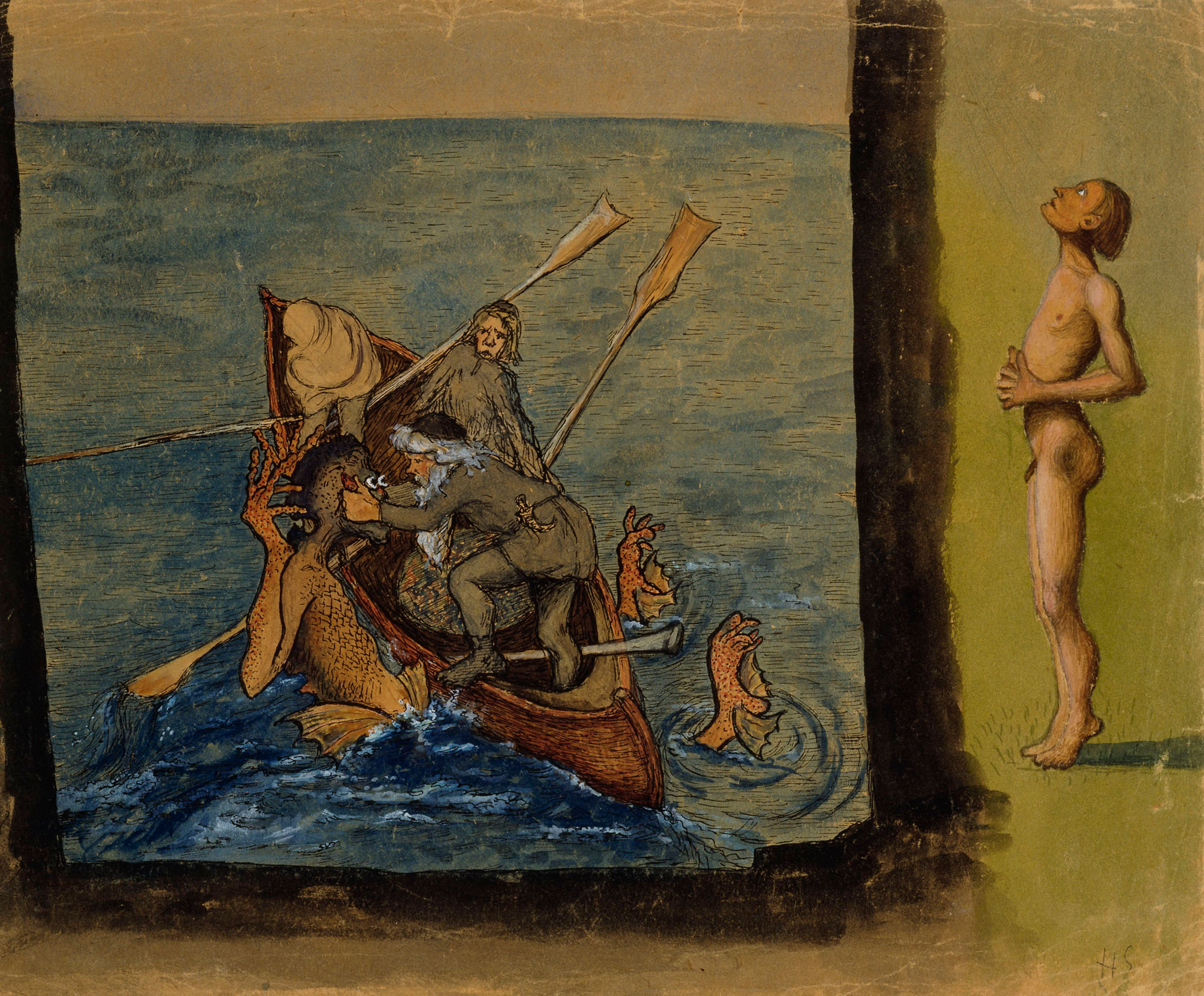
Väinämöinen and Ikiturso by Hugo Simberg (circa 1897).

He is mentioned several times in the Finnish national epic, the Kalevala. In the second cantos he rises from the sea and burns a stack of hay. Later, a giant oak grows from the ashes. The tree grows so large that it hides the sun and the moon and is cut down.

From the ocean rose a giant,	From the acorn, quickly sprouting,
Mighty Tursas, tall and hardy,	Grows the oak-tree, tall and stately,
Pressed compactly all the grasses,	From the ground enriched by ashes,
That the maidens had been raking,	Newly raked by water-maidens;
When a fire within them kindles,	Spread the oak-trees many branches,
And the flames shot up to heaven,	Rounds itself a broad corona,
Till the windrows burned to ashes,	Raises it above the storm-clouds;
Only ashes now remaining	Far it stretches out its branches,
Of the grasses raked together.	Stops the white-clouds in their courses,
In the ashes of the windows,	With its branches hides the sunlight,
Tender leaves the giant places,	With its many leaves, the moonbeams,
In the leaves he plants an acorn,	And the starlight dies in heaven.

Later, Iku-Turso is summoned by Louhi, the Lady of the North, to stop the theft of the magical artifact Sampo. Väinämöinen, the leader of the plunderers, grabs Iku-Turso from his ears and using magical words makes him promise to never return from the bottom of the sea.

Wainamoinen, brave and mighty,	Asked the second time the monster,	To the people of Wainola,
Seizes quick the water-monster,	Urgently inquired a third time:	Never while the moonlight glimmers
Lifts him by his ears and questions:	"Iku-Turso, son of Old-age,	On the hills of Kalevala!"
"Iku-Turso, son of Old-age,	Why art rising from the waters,
Why is art rising from the blue-sea?	Wherefore dost thou leave the blue-sea?	Then the singer, Wainamoinen,
Wherefore dost thou leave thy castle,	Iku-Turso gave this answer:	Freed the monster, Iku-Turso,
Show thyself to mighty heroes,	For this, cause I left my castle	Sent him to his deep sea-castles,
To the heroes of Wainola?"	Underneath the rolling billows:	Spake these words to him departing:
	Came I here with the intention	"Iku-Turso, son of Old-age,
Iku-Turso, son of Old-age,	To destroy the Kalew-heroes,	Nevermore arise from the ocean,
Ocean monster, manifested	And return the magic Sampo	Nevermore let Northland-heroes
Neither pleasure nor displeasure,	To the people of Pohyola.	See thy face above the waters I
Was not in the least affrighted,	If thou wilt restore my freedom,	Nevermore has Iku-Turso
Did not give the hero an answer.	Spare my life, from pain and sorrow,	Risen to the ocean-level;
	I will quick retrace my journey,	Never since have Northland sailors
Whereupon the ancient minstrel,	Nevermore to show my visage	Seen the head of this sea-monster.

== Legacy ==
Two variants of tursaansydän ('heart of Tursas'), also known as mursunsydän (heart of walrus), an ancient Nordic symbol believed to bring good luck and protect from curses.

A Northern European, Pre-Christian good luck symbol has been called tursaansydän 'heart of Tursas' at least in Kainuu.

Nowadays meritursas means the common octopus in Finnish, but it is more common to see the word mustekala (lit. 'ink fish'), the name of its Subclass Coleoidea in Finnish, for the octopus. Tursas has been presented as a synonym for mursu 'walrus', but this is uncertain.

One of the three Vetehinen class submarines used by Finland in the Second World War was named after Iku-Turso. After the war the Soviet Union denied Finland the use of submarines, and she was sold to Belgium for scrapping. The Asteroid 2828 Iku-Turso was named after Iku-Turso.

== In popular culture ==
- The Finnish folk metal band Turisas is named after the war god.
- Iku-Turso is featured as a monster in Final Fantasy XI.
- In late 2009 the professional wrestling promotion CHIKARA introduced a character named Tursas, based on the mythological being.
- Iku-Turso wreaks havoc in Helsinki in the Donald Duck comic book story The Quest for Kalevala by Don Rosa.
- The Ikitursa heavy assault cruiser is a class of spaceship in EVE Online.
- In Fear & Hunger 2: Termina, a similar entity called Iki-Turso can be briefly interacted with.
- In the video game Noita, there's an enemy called the Turso, which is inspired by the Iku-Turso's name and its sea creature appearance.
- In the mobile game Fate/Grand Order, berserker-class servant Louhi can summon Turisas in her attacks.

== See also ==
- Näkki
