= Distelfink =

Bird motif in visual art

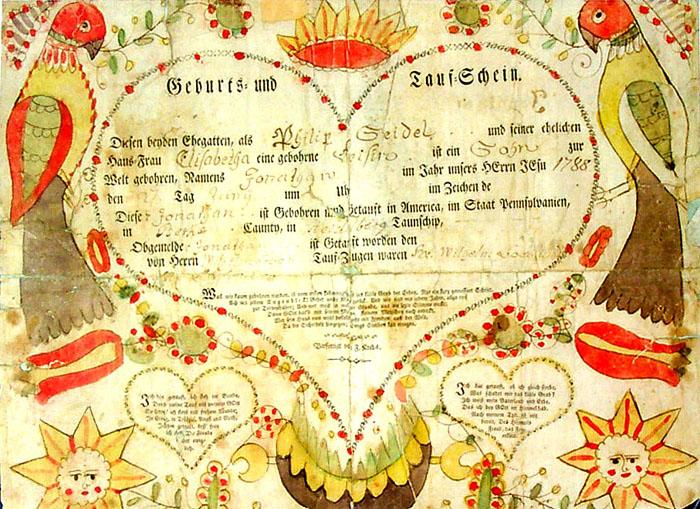
An ornate Taufschein, or baptismal certificate, bordered by two distelfinks

A distelfink is a stylized goldfinch, probably based on the European variety. It frequently appears in Pennsylvania Dutch folk art. It represents happiness and good fortune and the Pennsylvania German people, and is a common theme in hex signs and in fraktur. The word distelfink (literally 'thistle-finch') is (besides Stieglitz) the German name for the European goldfinch.

== In popular culture ==
During the 1940s, variations of Distelfink birds with flowers, hearts and tulips became popular designs for crochet, pottery and wallpaper patterns.

Distelfink was adopted as the name for a chain of drive-in restaurants serving Pennsylvania Dutch food that became popular across Pennsylvania during the twentieth century. Sandoe's Distelfink, which was located in Gettysburg, which was built by Cecil Sandoe in 1954, was patronized by a number of prominent Americans, including former first lady of the United States Mamie Eisenhower and Baltimore Orioles baseball star Brooks Robinson.

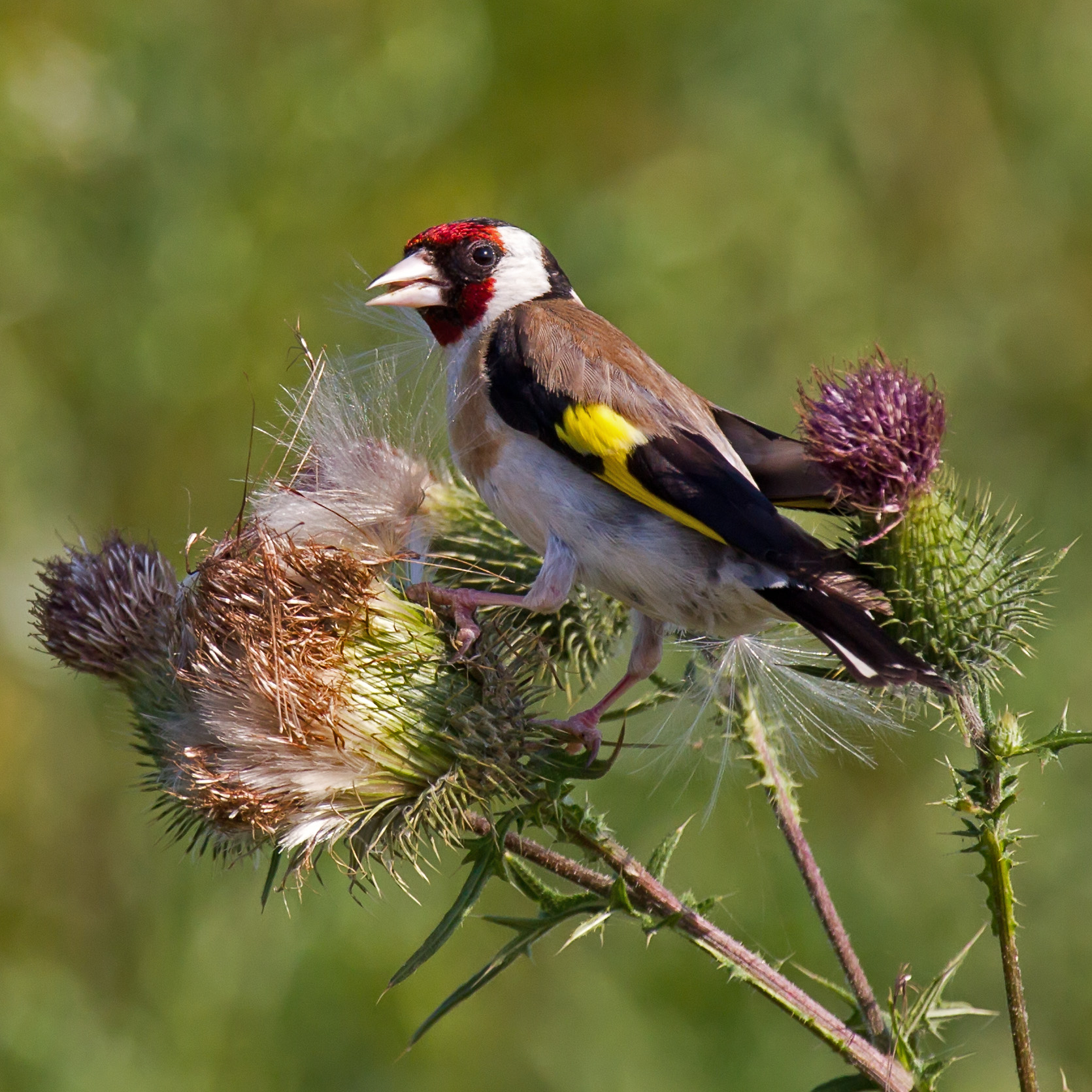
A European Goldfinch on a thistle

In the story "The Sign of the Triple Distelfink", the American cartoonist Don Rosa used a triple distelfink hex sign as the origin for Gladstone Gander's remarkable luck.
