= Adorn =

Adorn may refer to:

- Barnstar, a decorative piece in the shape of a five-point star used to adorn the barn
- Fretwork, an interlaced decorative design that is either carved in low relief on a solid background, or cut out with a fretsaw, jigsaw or scrollsaw
- Instruct, See: Resh Lakish#Examples of his exegesis
- Others to Adorn (1938), book by Oliver St. John Gogarty
- Purfling, a narrow decorative wooden (sometimes abalone) strip inlaid into the top and (often) bottom plates of stringed instruments
- "Adorn" (song), a song by Miguel
