= The Once and Future Duck =

1996 Donald Duck comic book story by Don Rosa

- Story code: D 95079
- Story: Don Rosa
- Ink: Don Rosa
- Hero: Donald Duck
- Pages: 24
- Layout: 4 rows per page
- Appearances: Donald Duck; Huey, Dewey, and Louie; Gyro Gearloose; Little Helper
- First publication: Kalle Anka & C:o #1996-21-22; May 17, 1996 and #1996-23; May 31, 1996

"The Once and Future Duck" is a 1996 Donald Duck story by Don Rosa. The title is a pun on T.H. White's Arthurian novel The Once and Future King.

The story was first published in the Danish Anders And & Co. #1996-21; the first American publication was serialized in Walt Disney's Comics and Stories #607-609, in January-March 1997.

== Plot ==
Donald Duck is testing Gyro Gearloose's new time machine. The machine is so unpredictable that Donald's nephews warn their uncle that he might end up at any time in the past, and thus advise him to do the testing at the Stonehenge, which has remained unaltered for millennia.

Donald, Gyro, and the boys travel to the United Kingdom to test the time machine at Stonehenge. The machine sends them centuries into the past, during the time of Sub-Roman Britain. There, the ducks meet "King Arthur"—Artorius Riothamus, the last descendant of Lucius Artorius Castus, and find out that he is nowhere near the glorious benevolent ruler history has made him to be; instead, he's a common warlord without much morals to speak of. Fearing the ducks are Saxon invaders, Arthur has Donald and his nephews imprisoned. He is just about to execute Donald, but at the last moment, Gyro sounds a car horn, which scares the Britons off.

Arthur goes after Donald, intending to finish him off, but a combination of Gyro's technology and the mystical power of Stonehenge gives Donald awesome powers. An epic duel ensues between Arthur and Donald. In the end, Arthur strikes his famous sword into a stone, but is unable to get it out. Gyro's Little Helper, imbued with the mystical power, pulls it out and drives the Britons off, giving Gyro time to transport the ducks back into the present.

This comic is based on the Pertwillaby Papers adventure Knighttime.
