= The Adventures of Captain Kentucky =

1979-1982 American comic strip

- Author(s): Don Rosa
- Illustrator(s): Don Rosa
- Current status/schedule: Concluded
- Launch date: October 6, 1979
- End date: August 15, 1982
- Genre(s): Superhero; Adventure

The Adventures of Captain Kentucky is a weekly comic-strip by Don Rosa, in the local newspaper Louisville Times. It ran from October 6, 1979, to August 15, 1982, after the publication of 150 episodes.

It was a continuation of his earlier comic strip,The Pertwillaby Papers, featuring the main character Lance Pertwillaby. In this sequel, Lance has taken up a job as a newspaper journalist in Louisville, Kentucky, Don Rosa's hometown. Due to toxic waste being dumped into a sewer where Lance was working on a story, he discovers that consuming the toxic waste temporarily grants him superpowers. He salvages a large barrel and keeps a small vial of it on his person for emergencies. The comic often incorporated real events and local celebrities from Louisville and Kentucky as backdrops, or occasionally as supporting characters in storylines.

Also featured was Lance's Basset hound Cleo, based on Don Rosa's own dog of the same name and breed.

== Collections ==
- The Captain Kentucky Collection, 3 volumes, 1981–85
- The Don Rosa Archives - The Complete Captain Kentucky, 2001, Gazette Bok, ISBN 8291149089
- Don Rosa Classics - The Complete Captain Kentucky, 2012, Dani Books, ISBN 978-3-944077-00-0
