= The Sign of the Triple Distelfink =

- Story code: D 97437
- Story: Don Rosa
- Ink: Don Rosa
- Hero: Gladstone Gander
- Pages: 14
- Layout: 4 rows per page
- Appearances: Gladstone Gander; Donald Duck; Huey, Dewey, and Louie; Scrooge McDuck; Grandma Duck; Daisy Duck

"The Sign of the Triple Distelfink" is a Donald Duck comic story by Don Rosa. It serves primarily to establish the origin of Gladstone Gander's extraordinary luck.

The story was first published in the Danish Anders And & Co. #1998-04; the first American publication was in Uncle Scrooge #310, in June 1998.

== Plot ==
It is Gladstone Gander's birthday, and Daisy Duck is planning a big party for him at Grandma Duck's farm. However, Gladstone is nowhere to be seen. He is purposefully hiding from his relatives, because his birthday is the only day in the entire year when he is unlucky, and he wants to avoid coming to any harm.

Not wanting Donald and Daisy to discover him, Gladstone heads away from Grandma's farm, but a sequence of extraordinarily improbable events foils each of his travel attempts, first in a taxicab, then in a train, and finally in an aeroplane. Gladstone is on a flight to Alaska, but he is accidentally evacuated from the plane, landing on a hot-air balloon, which takes him to Grandma's farm, against his wishes.

At Grandma's farm, the origin of Gladstone's unlucky birthday is revealed. Way back when Gladstone's mother Daphne Duck was born, a travelling painter had painted a sign of a "triple distelfink" on the front end of Grandma's barn, keeping good luck in, and an upside-down version of the same sign on the back end, keeping bad luck out. Later, Gladstone was born on his mother's birthday, and during one of his childhood birthday parties, lightning had hit him while he had been hoisted on the upside-down distelfink sign by Donald. The event caused his birthday to become the only exception to his near-universal good luck.

When Donald and Gladstone hear of this, both of them rush to the front end of the barn, trying to get hit by lightning again, but this time on the rightside-up sign. Donald hoists himself up first, but the part of the roof where the rope is attached is rotten and falls away, making Donald fall back down and flinging Gladstone up in the air instead. Lightning hits Gladstone on the rightside-up sign, and thus the bad luck is annulled, and Gladstone is now lucky throughout the entire year.

The German word Distelfink means European goldfinch in English.
