= Tursaansydän =

Ancient symbol used in Northern Europe

Variations of the tursaansydän symbol

The tursaansydän or tursan sydän (lit. 'heart of Tursas' or 'heart of octopus'), also called mursunsydän (lit. 'heart of the walrus'), is an ancient swastika-like symbol used in Northern Europe. The symbol originates from prehistoric times. The tursaansydän was believed to bring good luck and protect from curses, and was used as a decorative motif on wooden furniture and buildings in Finland. A brick dating to the 14th or 15th century bearing a tursaansydän motif was found during restorations of the Häme Castle.

The symbol was known as mursunsydän in Nivala, and tursaansydän and turskansydän in Kainuu. In Nurmes, mursu meant the same as Tursas: a scary haltija that lived in a nest of red ants.

During the 18th century the simple swastika became more popular in Finnish wood decoration than the more complex tursaansydän.

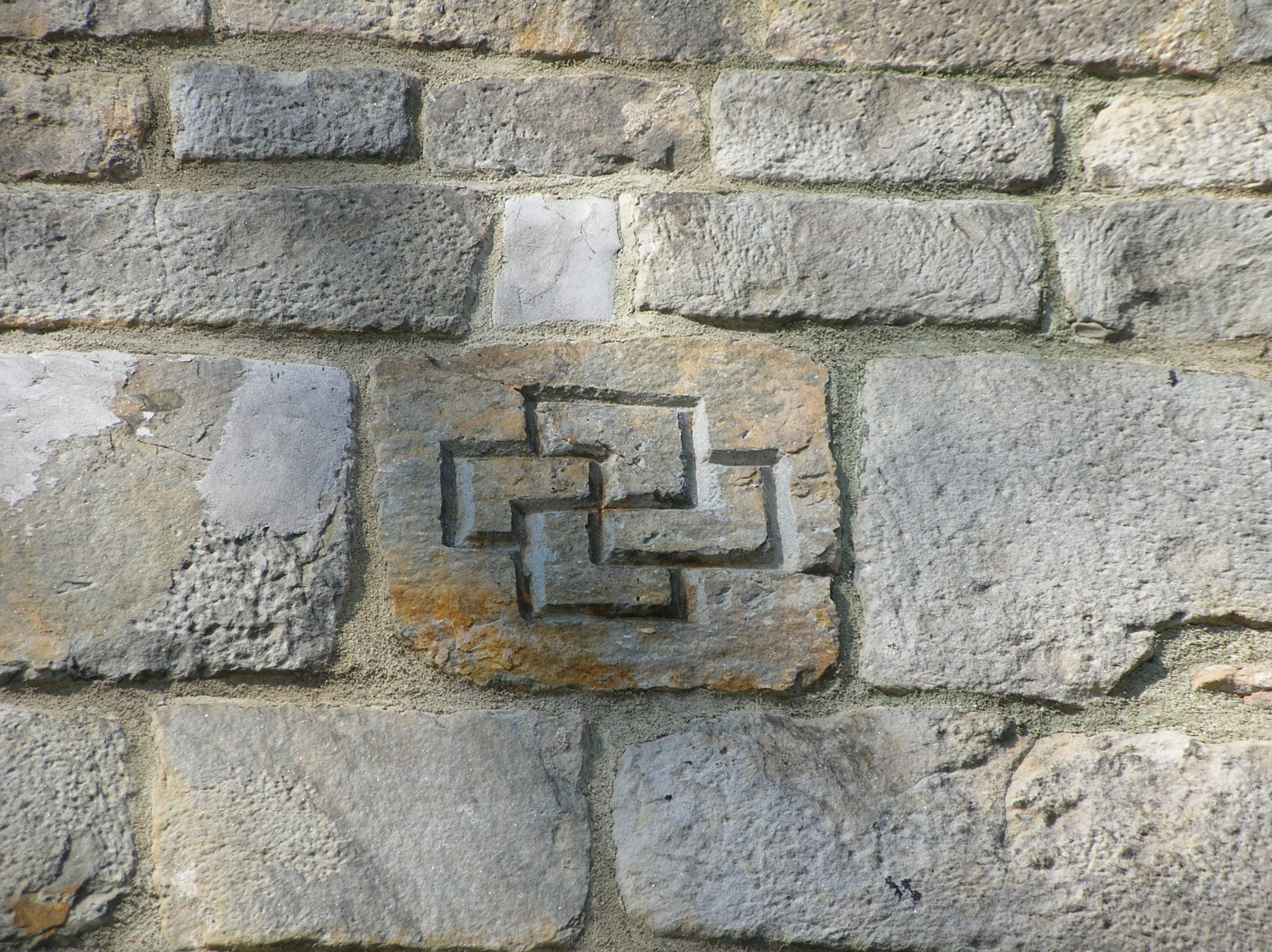
Tursaansydän carved in a 12th-century church in Kruszwica, Poland.

== In modern usage ==
Author Ilmari Kianto used the tursaansydän as his logo. Kianto had found a tursaansydän carved into his childhood home's granary's door in Suomussalmi.

The Slavic Union used the tursaansydän in their logo, before the organization was banned in 2010.

The Finnish Alliance approved of the tursaansydän as their symbol in 1998.

== See also ==
- Hannunvaakuna
- Sun cross
- Swastika
- Thor's Hammer
- Thunderbolt
- Ukonvasara
- Vajra
- Valknut
