= Hex sign =

Pennsylvania Dutch folk art symbol

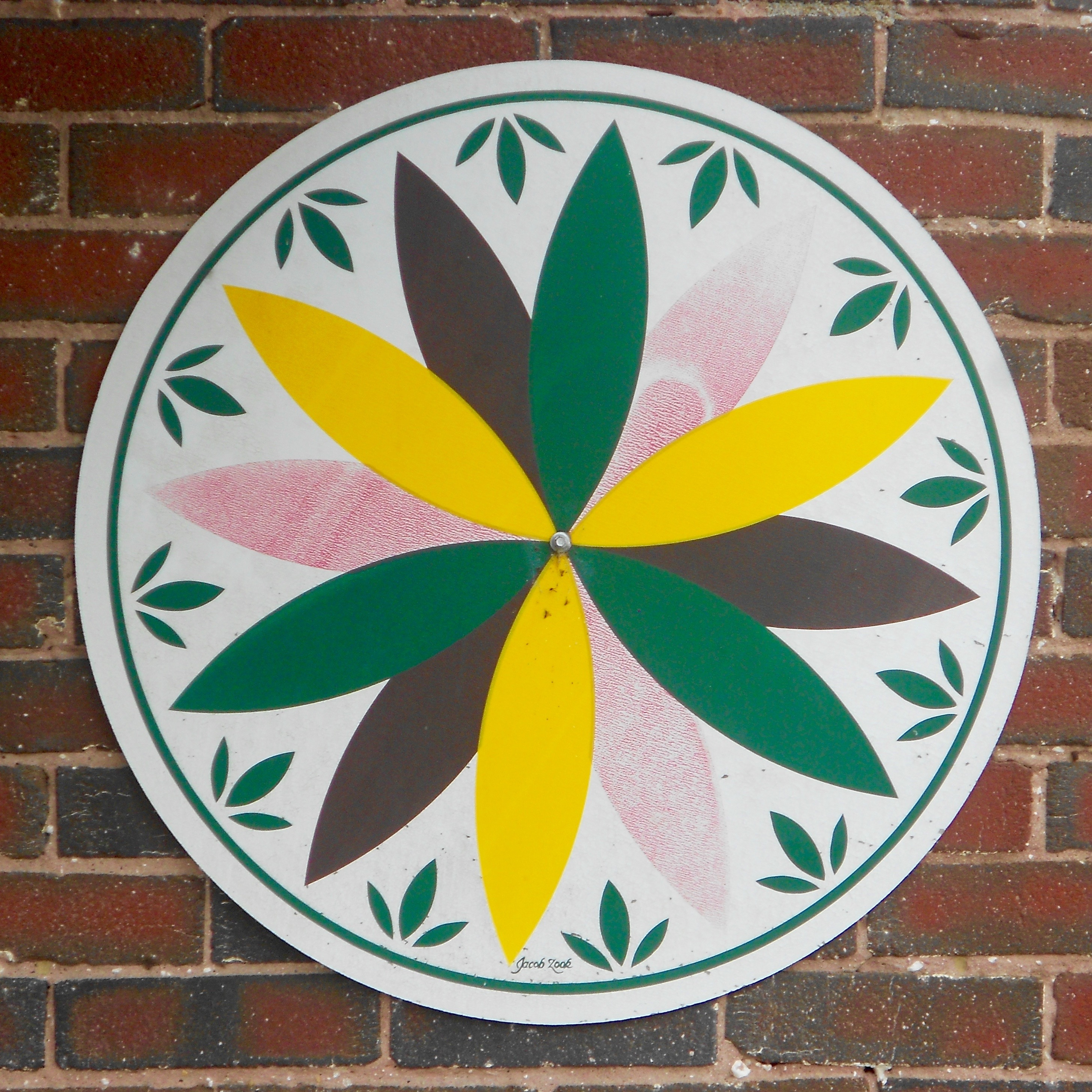
12-pointed compass rose on a hex sign

Hex signs are a form of Pennsylvania Dutch folk art, related to fraktur, found in the Fancy Dutch tradition in Pennsylvania Dutch Country. Barn paintings, usually in the form of "stars in circles", began to appear on the landscape in the early 19th century and became widespread decades later when commercial ready-mixed paint became readily available. By the 1950s commercialized hex signs, aimed at the tourist market, became popular and these often include stars, compass roses, stylized birds known as distelfinks, hearts, tulips, or a tree of life. Two schools of thought exist on the meaning of hex signs. One school ascribes a talismanic nature to the signs; the other sees them as purely decorative. Both schools recognize that there are sometimes superstitions associated with certain hex sign themes and neither ascribes strong magical power to them. The Amish do not use hex signs.

== Form and use ==
Painted barn stars in circular borders are a common sight on Pennsylvania Dutch barns in central and southeastern Pennsylvania, especially in Berks County, Lancaster County, and Lehigh County. However, the modern decoration of barns is a late development in Pennsylvania Dutch folk art. Prior to the 1830s, the cost of paint meant that most barns were unpainted. As paint became affordable, the Pennsylvania Dutch began to decorate their barns much like they decorated items in their homes. Barn decorating reached its peak in the early 20th century, at which time there were many artists who specialized in barn decorating. Drawing from a large repertoire of designs, barn painters combined many elements in their decorations. The geometric patterns of quilts can be seen in the patterns of many hex signs. Hearts and tulips seen on barns are commonly found on elaborately lettered and decorated birth, baptism, and marriage certificates known as fraktur.

Throughout the 20th century, hex signs were often produced as commodities for the tourist industry in Pennsylvania. These signs could be bought and then mounted onto barns and used as household decorations. Jacob Zook of Paradise, Pennsylvania, claimed to have originated the modern mountable sign in 1942, based on traditional designs, to be sold in souvenir gift shops to tourists along the Lincoln Highway. Edward Buchak of Gilbertsville, Pennsylvania, designed and produced many Jacob Zook signs via screen printing. William Schuster, Milton Hill, Johnny Ott, and Johnny and Eric Claypoole also contributed to this hex sign revival or adaptation. Modern artists may stress the symbolic meanings, for example, a horse head is used to protect animals from disease and the building from lightning and a dove represents peace and contentment. An unusual use is the official logo of the Pennsylvania Bureau of Radiation Protection, which incorporates the international symbol for radiation into its yellow-and-red adaptation of a traditional hex sign design.

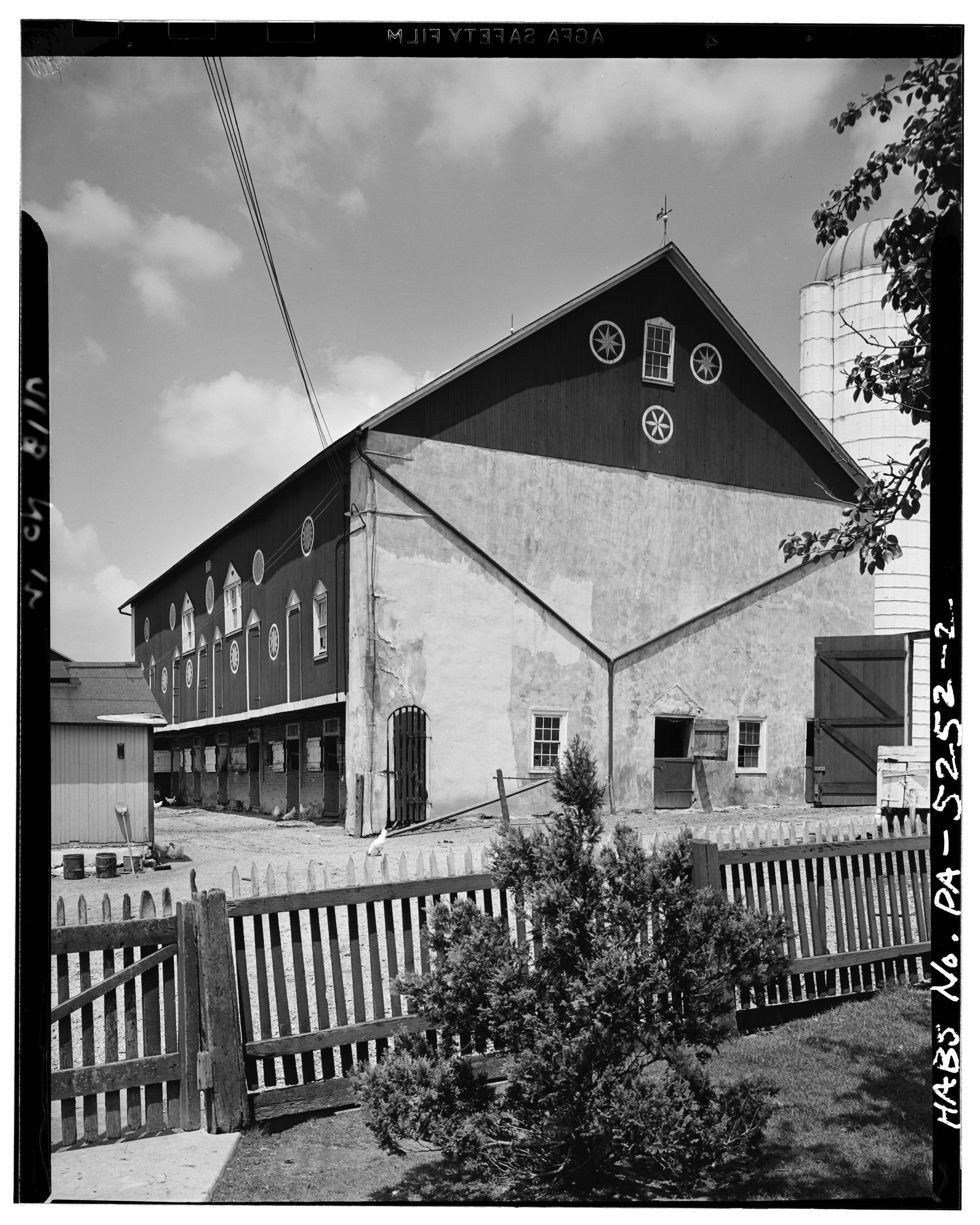
H. & S. Hoffman Barn, bearing twelve hex signs, in Montgomery County, Pa.

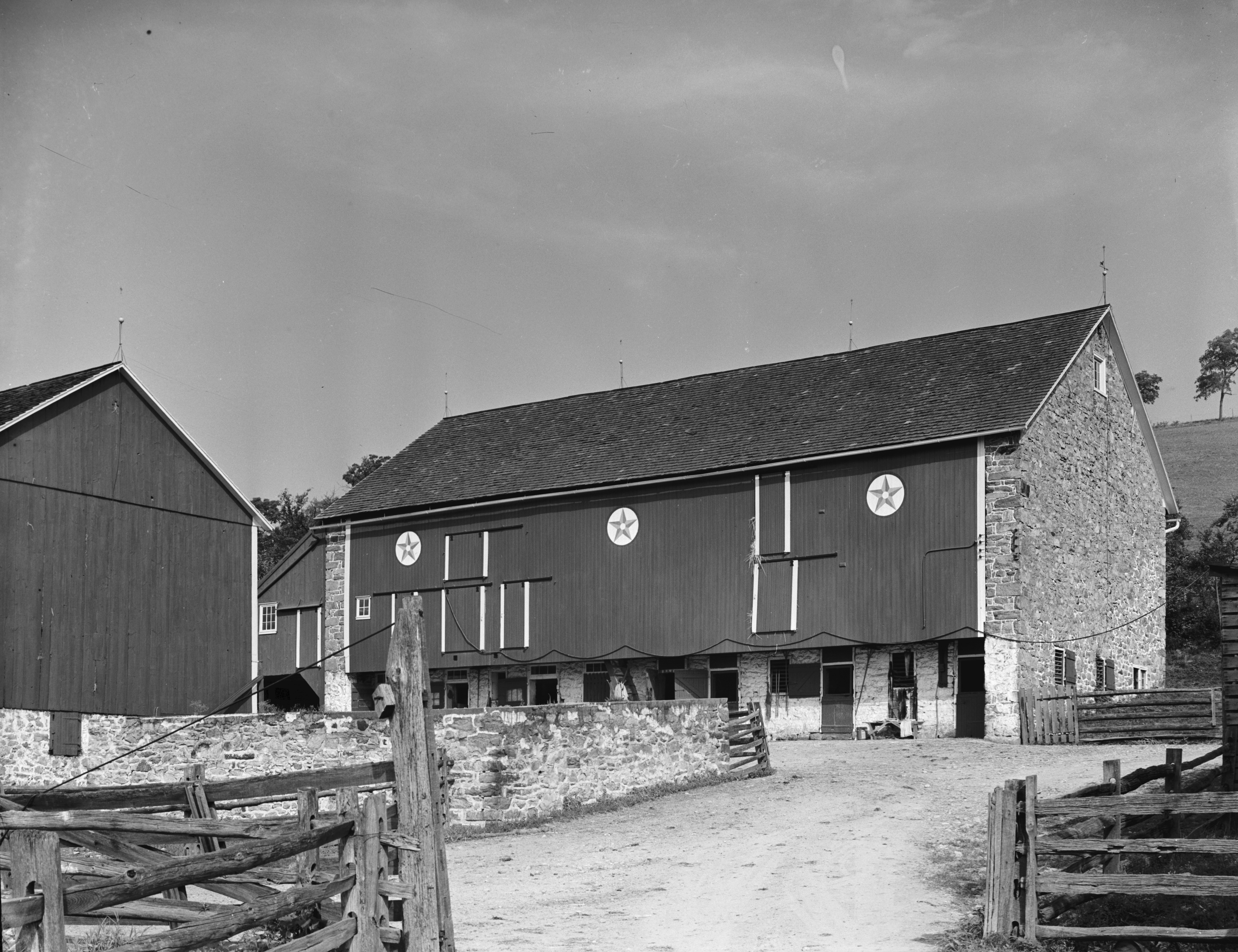
Barn with hex signs in Oley Township, Berks County, Pennsylvania in 1941

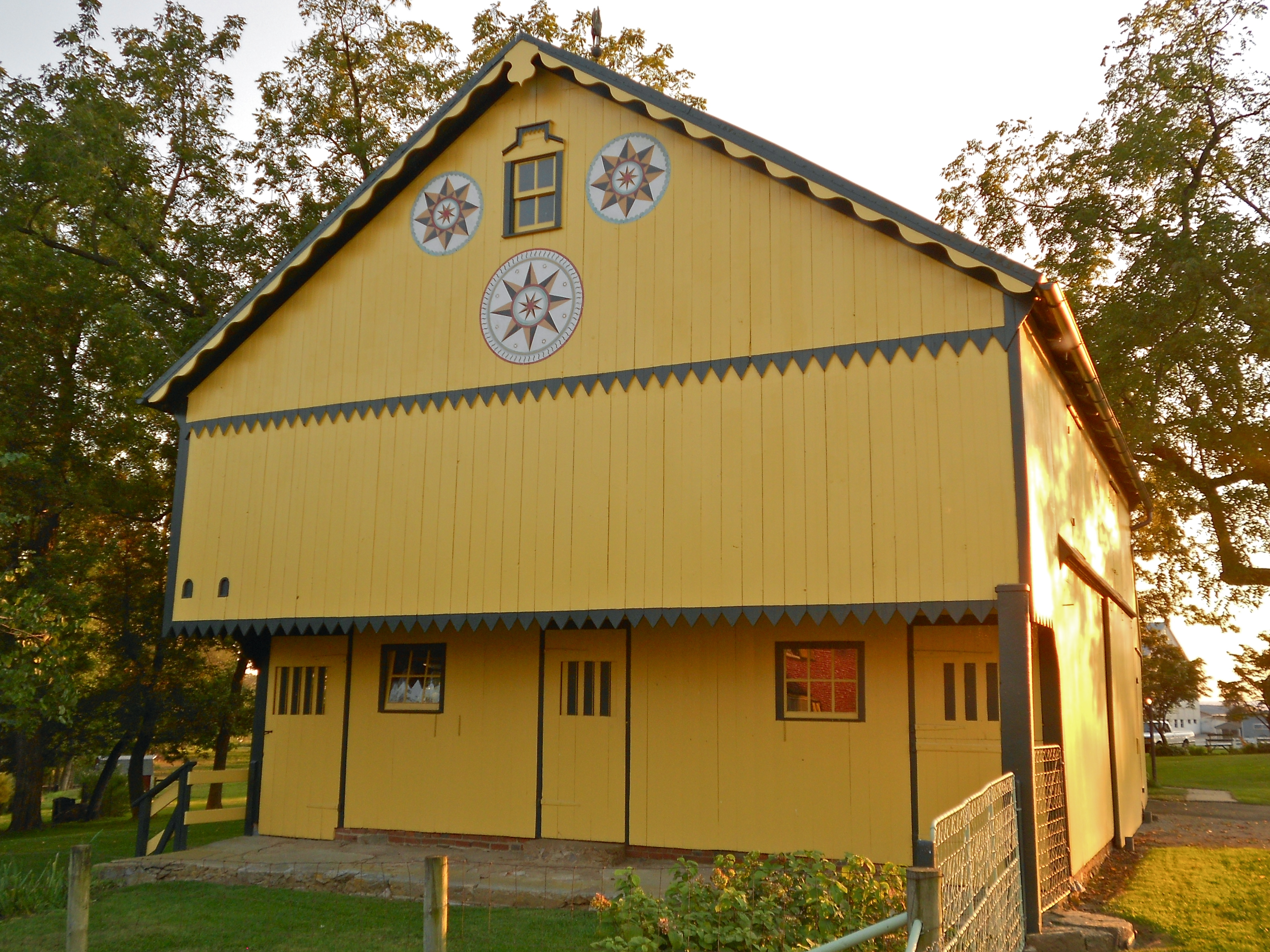
Barn with compass rose hex signs at the historic Mascot Mills in Lancaster County

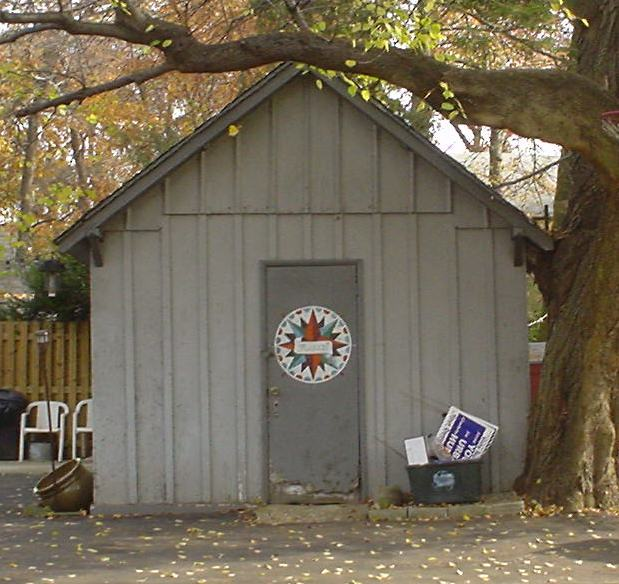
A simple hex sign in the form of a compass rose on a suburban shed

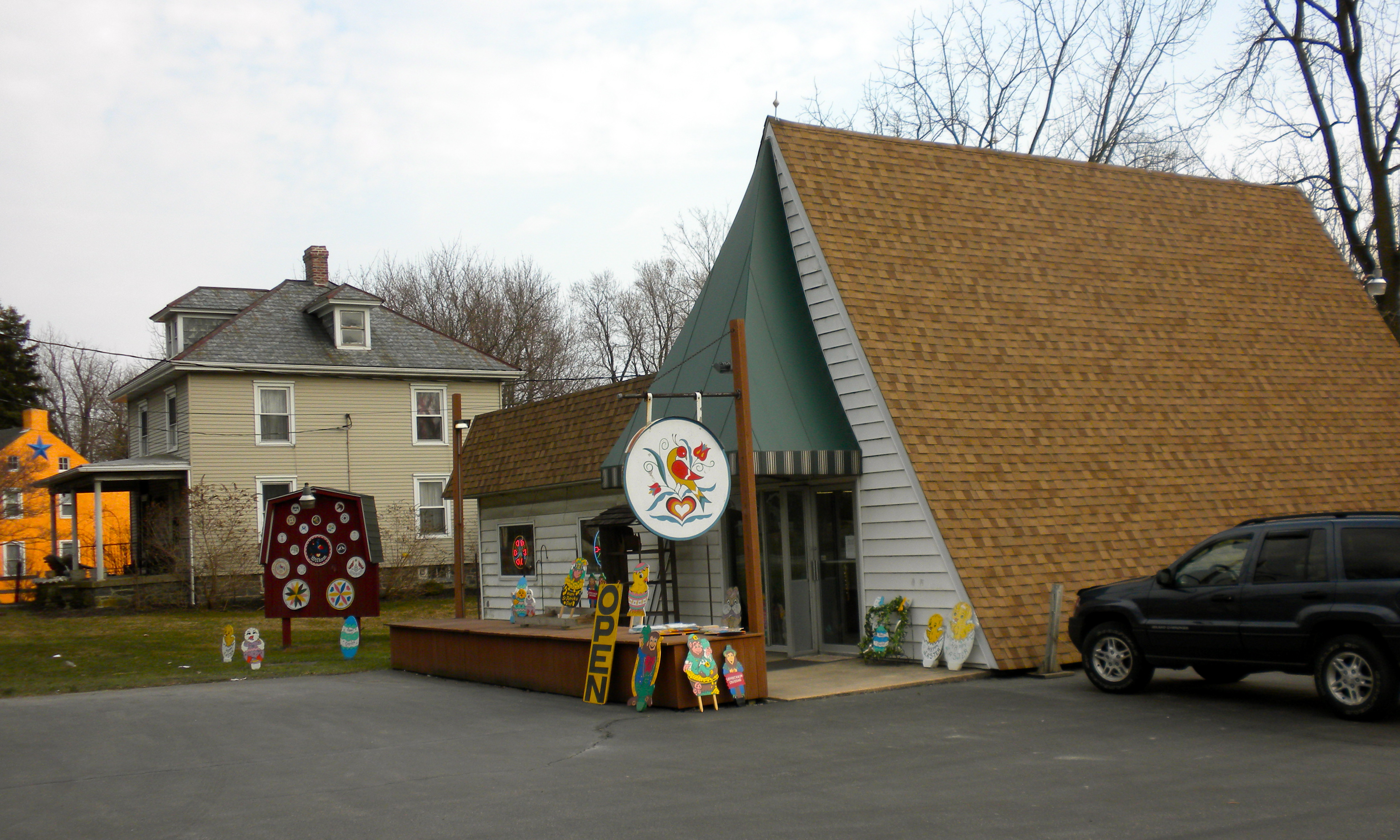
Souvenir shop in Lancaster County selling hex signs

== Controversy over origins ==
There are two opposing schools of belief regarding the derivation of the name. The term hex with occult connotations may derive from the Pennsylvania German word "hex" (German Hexe, Dutch heks), meaning "witch". However, the term "hex sign" was not used until the 20th century, after 1924 when Wallace Nutting's book Pennsylvania Beautiful was published. Nutting, who was not a Pennsylvania native, interviewed farmers about their distinctive barn decoration. Before this time there was no standardized term and many Pennsylvania German farmers simply called the signs as a Blume or Sterne (meaning flowers or stars). However one farmer used the term Hexefoos (meaning 'witch foot') in his description. The term became popular with Pennsylvania Germans themselves during the blossoming tourist trade of southeastern Pennsylvania.

These signs were traditionally adorned with six-pointed stars. There is also the belief that the origin leading to the term "hex sign" is that English settlers mispronounced the German word for six, "sechs", as "hex".

In recent years, hex signs have come to be used by non–Pennsylvania Dutch persons as talismans for folk magic rather than as items of decoration. Some believe that both the Pennsylvania German barn design and hex designs originate with the Alpine Germans. They note that hexes are of pre-Christian Germanic origin; for instance, a circled rosette is called the Sun of the Alps in Padania (the Po Valley). Based on this history, neopagans have taken up the practice of creating hex signs, incorporating other pre-Christian signs and symbols into the hex work. Gandee, in his book Strange Experience, Autobiography of a Hexenmeister, described hex signs as "painted prayers".

Some view the designs as decorative symbols of ethnic identification, possibly originating in reaction to 19th century attempts made by the government to suppress the Pennsylvania German language. Anabaptist sects in the region, such as the Amish and Mennonites, have a negative view of hex signs, and they are rarely, if ever, seen on an Amish or Mennonite household or farm.

== See also ==
- Pentagram
- Pow-wow (folk magic)

== Sources ==
- Gandee, Lee R. (1971). "The Strangest Prayers Are Painted". Strange Experience: The Autobiography of a Hexenmeister. Prentice-Hall. ISBN 978-0-13-850966-8.
- Graves, Thomas E. (1984). The Pennsylvania German Hex Sign: A Study in Folk Process (Unpublished Ph.D. dissertation). Philadelphia, PA: University of Pennsylvania.
- Hoyt, Ivan E.; Hoyt, Dorothy M. (2008). Hex Signs: Tips, Tools, and Techniques for Learning the Craft. Mechanicsburg, PA: Stackpole Books. ISBN 9780811703222.
- La Gorce, John Oliver (July–December 1948). "Artists Look at Pennsylvania". National Geographic Magazine. 94. Washington, D.C.
- Richman, Irwin (2004). ""Pennsylvania Dutch stuff"". The Pennsylvania Dutch Country. Making of America series. Arcadia Publishing. pp. 53–116. ISBN 9780738524580.
- Thorsson, Edred (1998). "Operant Hexology". Northern Magic: Rune Mysteries and Shamanism. Llewellyn Publications. pp. 145, 146. ISBN 1567187099.
- Yoder, Don; Graves, Thomas E. (2000). Hex Signs: Pennsylvania Dutch Barn Symbols and Their Meaning. Mechanicsburg, PA: Stackpole. p. 96. ISBN 0-8117-2799-8.
- Yoder, Hunter M. (2012). Heiden Hexology, Essays and Interviews. Zaubereigarten/The Hex Factory. pp. 7–9. ISBN 9781475051247.
