= The Quest for Kalevala =

1999 Uncle Scrooge comic book story written and drawn by Don Rosa

- Cover for the German publication of the story. Art by Don Rosa.
- Story code: D 99078
- Story: Don Rosa
- Ink: Don Rosa
- Hero: Scrooge McDuck
- Pages: 33
- Layout: 4 rows per page
- Appearances: Scrooge McDuck; Donald Duck; Huey, Dewey and Louie; Gyro Gearloose; Little Helper; Magica De Spell; Väinämöinen (mythological); Louhi (mythological); Tuoni (mythological); Iku-Turso (mythological); Elias Lönnrot (historical, in a flashback)
- First publication: Aku Ankka: Sammon salaisuus ja muita Don Rosan parhaita November 10, 1999

"The Quest for Kalevala" is a 1999 Uncle Scrooge comic book story written and drawn by Don Rosa. The story was first published in the Danish Anders And & Co. #1999-48; the first American publication was in Uncle Scrooge #334, in October 2004.

The Quest for Kalevala is based on the Finnish national epic Kalevala, assembled and partly written by Elias Lönnrot in the 19th century. Rosa's inspiration for the story was a Finnish children's book called Koirien Kalevala ("The Canine Kalevala") by the Finnish cartoonist Mauri Kunnas, who was himself inspired by the original Kalevala.

Part of the story takes place in Helsinki, Finland, depicted in an accurate, realistic way as the city looked in the 1950s, though some buildings pictured weren't built until the 1960s.

== Plot ==
While going through his trunk full of old mementos and souvenirs, Scrooge discovers a page that he remembers having originally torn from one of Lönnrot's notebooks when they met in Scotland in the late 19th century. His three grandnephews consult their Junior Woodchucks Guidebook and find out that the notes on the page are part of Lönnrot's notes for the Kalevala, revealing the location of the remains of the Sampo.

Upon hearing of this mythical machine that can produce grain, salt, and, most particularly, gold out of thin air, Scrooge sets out to find it. The Ducks travel to Helsinki, where the director of the Finnish Literature Society explains Lönnrot's notes to them and the location marked within.

The Ducks travel to the island of Mustasaari indicated in the notes, where they find Väinämöinen's legendary sword. Touching this sword awakens the spirit of Väinämöinen, which uses the body of whoever touched the sword as its locus of connection to the mortal world. He tells them what happened to the Sampo during the Kalevala times. Väinämöinen's magic brings Gyro Gearloose to the island and, imbued with Seppo Ilmarinen's spirit, he reassembles the Sampo.

However, the Sampo doesn't work because it's missing a part that was stolen by Louhi, now residing in the afterlife of Tuonela, the underworld. Scrooge and Donald go to Tuonela to retrieve the missing part. However, after they have left, Louhi becomes aware of the return of her ancient enemy and summons Magica De Spell to help her get the Sampo back.

Sailing back to continental Finland, Väinämöinen and the Ducks are able to fix the Sampo. Soon, the machine starts producing gold from thin air. However, Magica De Spell and Louhi attack their ship. In the ensuing battle, Louhi manages to steal Väinämöinen's famous kantele, which holds such great power that she loses interest in the Sampo. As the start of her new reign, Louhi summons the sea monster Iku-Turso and orders it to wreak havoc on Helsinki. Donald goes after Iku-Turso to stop it, with the monster and Louhi being confounded by the modern city. In the process, Donald gets the kantele back and is able to lure Iku-Turso back into the sea. Gyro Gearloose and Magica de Spell are also magically sent away (but their destinations are comically mixed up, Magica finding herself in Gyro's lab in Duckburg and he emerging from her magic shop on Vesuvius).

With Louhi defeated and his kantele returned, Väinämöinen makes the ship levitate. The Ducks are thrown off the ship, except for Scrooge who clings to the Sampo. Väinämöinen sees a kindred spirit in Scrooge, but asks if he is really ready to follow him beyond the Northern Lights and so forsake his "own Kalevala" (Yukon) where "a lost love still awaits you" (alluding to Scrooge's complicated relationship with Glittering Goldie). Scrooge finds that he cannot do that. Väinämöinen then lets Scrooge fall from the ship and congratulates him on having made the right choice, allowing him to keep the crank of the Sampo as a memento. Scrooge finds himself back on earth together with his nephews.

== Notes ==
- All Kalevala characters speak with the poetic verse Lönnrot used in the original Kalevala.
- In the scene where Iku-Turso climbs on top of the Helsinki Cathedral, the Finnish bum's quote "That's the second biggest frog I ever saw" is a reference to the spy parody show Get Smart. It's also often thought to be a reference to an earlier Don Rosa story with Captain Kentucky, in which the hero of the story has to battle a gigantic frog, but Rosa has denied this.
- The notes the old Finnish man plays on his kantele make up the introduction to Finlandia by Jean Sibelius. When Louhi steals Väinämöinen's kantele and flees off to wreak havoc, she plays the opening notes of Ride of the Valkyries by Richard Wagner.
- In the Finnish hardcover edition, Rosa included an epilogue, where Tuoni (Death) brings Scrooge's hat back from Tuonela. Scrooge asks Tuoni whether it's possible to take his fortune with him when he dies, but after Tuoni asks a price of 50 Finnish markkas (about 8.40 Euro, 10 USD) for the secret, Scrooge asks Donald to kick him out of his office (which Donald does with sufficient strength to separate Tuoni's skull-like head from his body). In the version printed in The Don Rosa Library, Tuoni instead asks for a price of US$5 (about 4.38 Euro, 26.05 Finnish markkas).
- Rosa's famous "D.U.C.K." (Dedicated to Unca Carl from Keno) can be found in the title panel in the hilt of Väinämöinen's sword, on the mane of one of the horses.
- The ermine shown in the panel when the Ducks arrive in Mustasaari (Black Island), wears brown fur. This is wrong, because ermines have white fur during the winter (a pack of ermines appearing in the final page is correctly colored white).
