= Attack of the Hideous Space-Varmints =

- Don Rosa's cover artwork for the story.
- Story code: D 96203
- Alternative title: "Attack of the Hideous Space Monsters"
- Story: Don Rosa
- Ink: Don Rosa
- Hero: Scrooge McDuck
- Pages: 24
- Layout: 4 rows per page
- Appearances: Scrooge McDuck; Donald Duck; Huey, Dewey and Louie
- First publication: Walt Disney's Comics and Stories #614; July, 1997

"Attack of the Hideous Space-Varmints" or "Attack of the Hideous Space Monsters" is a 1997 Donald Duck story by Don Rosa.

The story was first published in the Danish Anders And & Co. #1997-33 through 1997–35; the first American publication was serialized in Walt Disney's Comics and Stories #614-616, in July–September 1997.

== Plot ==
Scrooge McDuck receives a shipment of space junk from his satellite business. The junk turns out to be an artificial meteorite-shaped probe containing an unknown device of alien origin. His curiosity piqued, Scrooge activates the device. This causes the whole Money Bin to shake, so Scrooge, Donald, and the nephews hastily evacuate the building.

Once outside, the ducks find that the whole Money Bin has started moving and takes off into the sky. Not wanting to lose his money, Scrooge goes after it in his secret rocket, taking Donald and the boys with him. The device controlling the Money Bin's flight takes the bin into warp speed, which takes both it and the ducks' rocket to the asteroid belt.

In the asteroid belt, Scrooge finds that a group of four aliens has laid claim on his Money Bin and are converting it into their new house. Scrooge, Donald, and the boys go after them to stop their plans. When the ducks and the aliens meet, it turns out that the aliens are the equivalent of a simple, peaceful farmer family. Scrooge befriends the family's aging grandfather, who has had quite a career in asteroid mining during his younger days.

Together with the alien grandfather, Scrooge has such fun reliving his younger days in the Yukon that he is torn between two choices - go back to Earth with family and friends or stay in space and have the adventure of his life. This dilemma is cut abruptly short when an alien police patrol appears, having come after the unlicensed warp speed device that was the root cause of the whole adventure. The police are decidedly unfriendly to ugly, evil aliens such as the ducks, so the ducks take the warp speed device back into the Money Bin and flee back to Earth.
