= A Matter of Some Gravity =

- Story code: D 96001
- Story: Don Rosa
- Ink: Don Rosa
- Hero: Scrooge McDuck
- Pages: 16
- Layout: 4 rows per page
- Appearances: Scrooge McDuck; Donald Duck; Huey, Dewey, and Louie; Magica De Spell; Emily Quackfaster
- First publication: 1996

"A Matter of Some Gravity" is a 1996 Uncle Scrooge adventure comic written and drawn by Don Rosa, featuring sorceress Magica De Spell. Like some other comic stories by Rosa (Cash Flow and The Universal Solvent), the story is founded with toying with the laws of nature, specifically gravity. Rosa claims that he got the ideas for those comics during a mechanical engineering course in an institute of higher education, which he took before he became a professional cartoonist.

The story was first published in the Danish Anders And & Co. #1996-32; the first American publication was in Walt Disney's Comics and Stories #610, in March 1997.

== Plot ==
The story begins with Donald Duck cleaning Scrooge McDuck's light fixtures, while complaining that he cannot reach them with his ladder, which Scrooge ignores him on. Slipping and falling into Emily Quackfaster's (Scrooge's secretary) chair while she's out, Donald accidentally lets Magica De Spell into Scrooge's office. Using a new wand, Magica changes their personal gravity sideways and makes off with the dime. Miraculously, including the fact that Magica is fleeing in the same direction her victims are "falling", Scrooge and Donald are able to make it outside to Donald's car, eventually running across store walls.

Finally, they succeed in getting to the airport with the help of Donald's nephews. Magica is shocked and furious that they have been able to get there, although Scrooge is unfazed, claiming her spell is not enough. Infuriated, she completely reverses their personal gravity, stranding them on the ceiling. Learning there is no current flight to Italy scheduled, Magica hypnotizes a pilot with a spell to take her away. Huey, Dewey, and Louie help their uncles' using their weight, along with a fire extinguisher, to propel them towards Magica's plane. Scrooge then uses Magica's wand to reverse the gravity of the plane itself, threatening to break an engine and make them fall out of Earth's atmosphere. Finally, they land back on the ground and Scrooge gets his dime back, breaking Magica's wand in the process.

However, Magica uses a half of her wand to reverse Donald's gravity. Luckily, as the spell only lasts 12 hours, Donald is now in the Money Bin, finally getting rid of the cobwebs (although he is now annoyed that he has to use a ladder to sweep the floor).

== Reception ==
The story received a nomination for "Best Short Story" in the Eisner Awards of 1998.
