= Barnstar =

Barn decoration in the United States

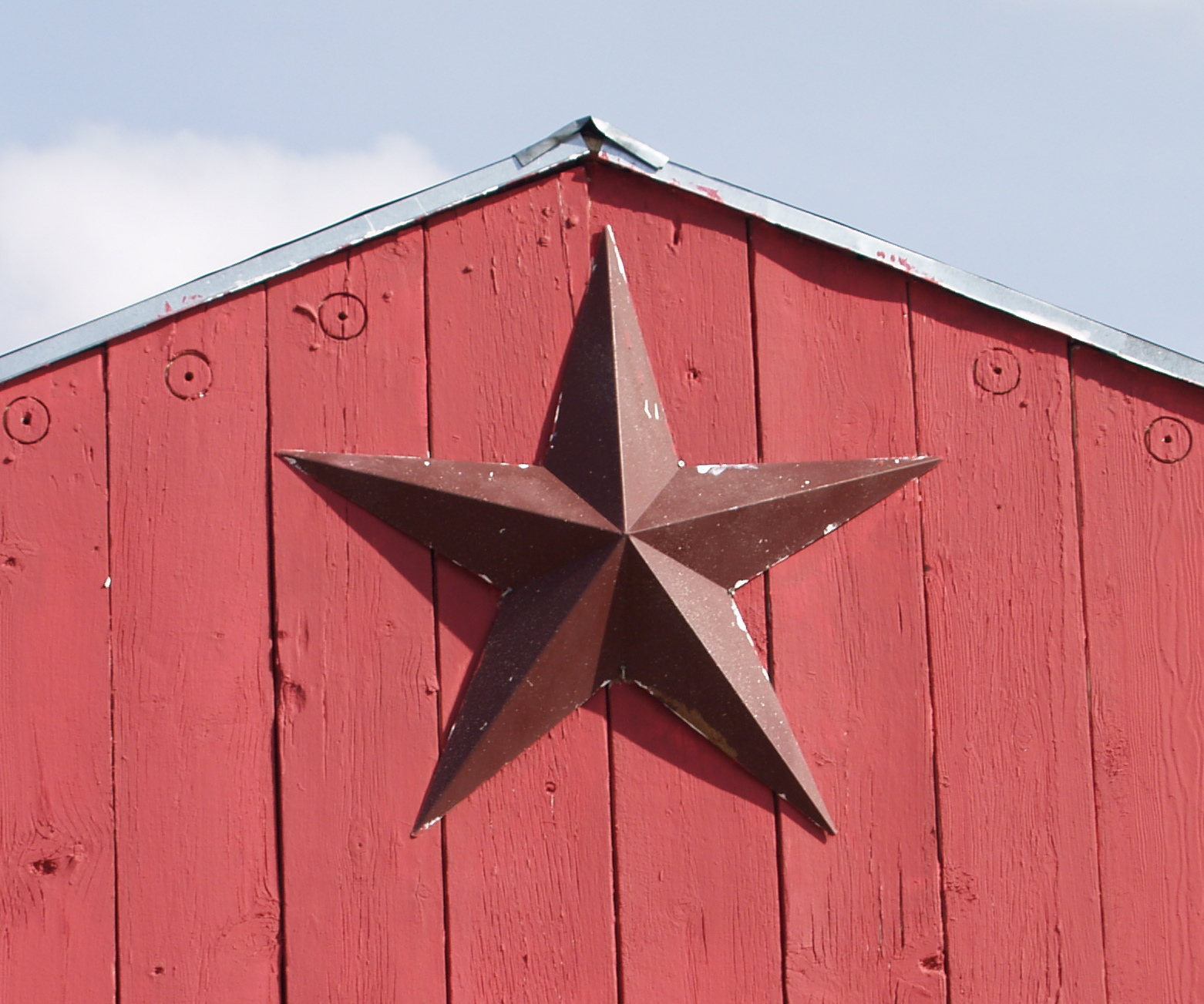
A barnstar

A barnstar (or barn star, primitive star, or Pennsylvania star) is a painted object or image, often in the shape of a five-pointed star but occasionally in a circular "wagon wheel" style, used to decorate a barn in some parts of the United States. They have no structural purpose but may be considered lucky, akin to a horseshoe mounted over a doorway. They are especially common in Pennsylvania and frequently seen in German-American farming communities. They are also found in Canada, particularly in the province of Ontario.

== History ==
Barnstars were meant to represent the mark of the builder but became more frequently used for aesthetic purposes and were added to the building after construction was complete. Enthusiasts have traced a number of wooden barnstars to individual builders in the Pennsylvania area, where numerous examples can still be seen.

Barnstars were used in the United States during the 18th century and as late as 1870 in Pennsylvania, where their popularity increased greatly following the Civil War. Their regular use preceded that time, however, and stars were commonplace on large buildings, particularly factories, in pre-war Richmond, Virginia.

Barnstars remain a popular form of decoration and design, and modern houses are sometimes decorated with simple, metal, five-pointed stars that the makers describe as "barn-stars". They are often deliberately distressed or rusted, alluding to the traditional decoration.

== Other star-shaped plates ==
On older buildings in the Pennsylvania Dutch area of the United States, it is still possible to find barnstar-like building adornments that are painted, rather than wooden or metal, known as hex signs. Strictly speaking, they are defined apart from barnstars and visually bear only passing resemblance, but the two are often confused and their names are even regarded as interchangeable. Some hex signs incorporate star shapes, while others may take the form of a rosette or contain pictures of birds and other animals.

The term barnstar has been applied to star-shaped anchor plates that are used for structural reinforcement, particularly on masonry buildings from the 18th and 19th centuries. These are made of cast iron and serve as the washers for tie rods. The anchor-rod-and-plate assembly serves to brace the masonry wall against tilting or lateral bowing.

Barnstars

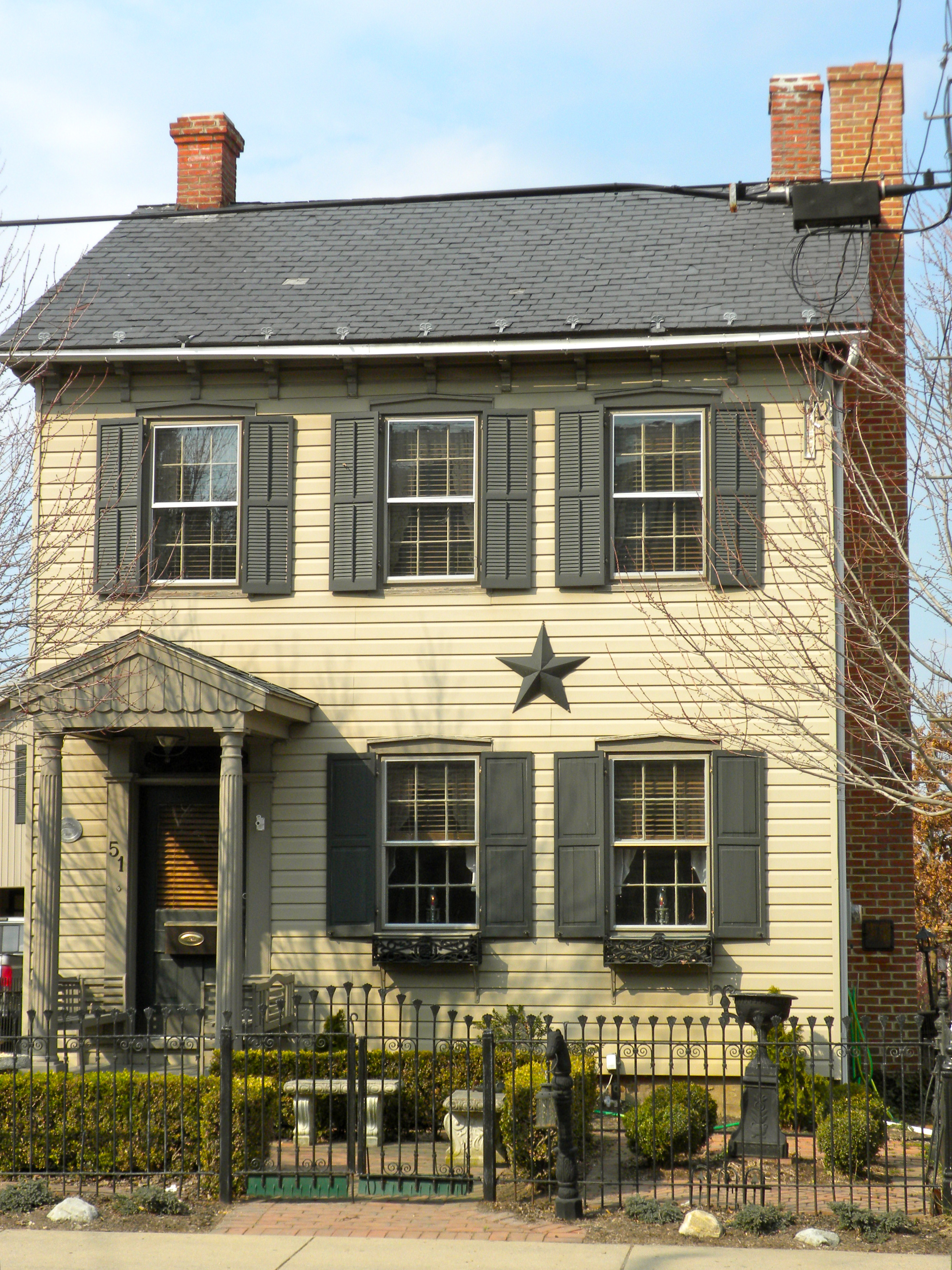
House with a barnstar in Strasburg, Pennsylvania

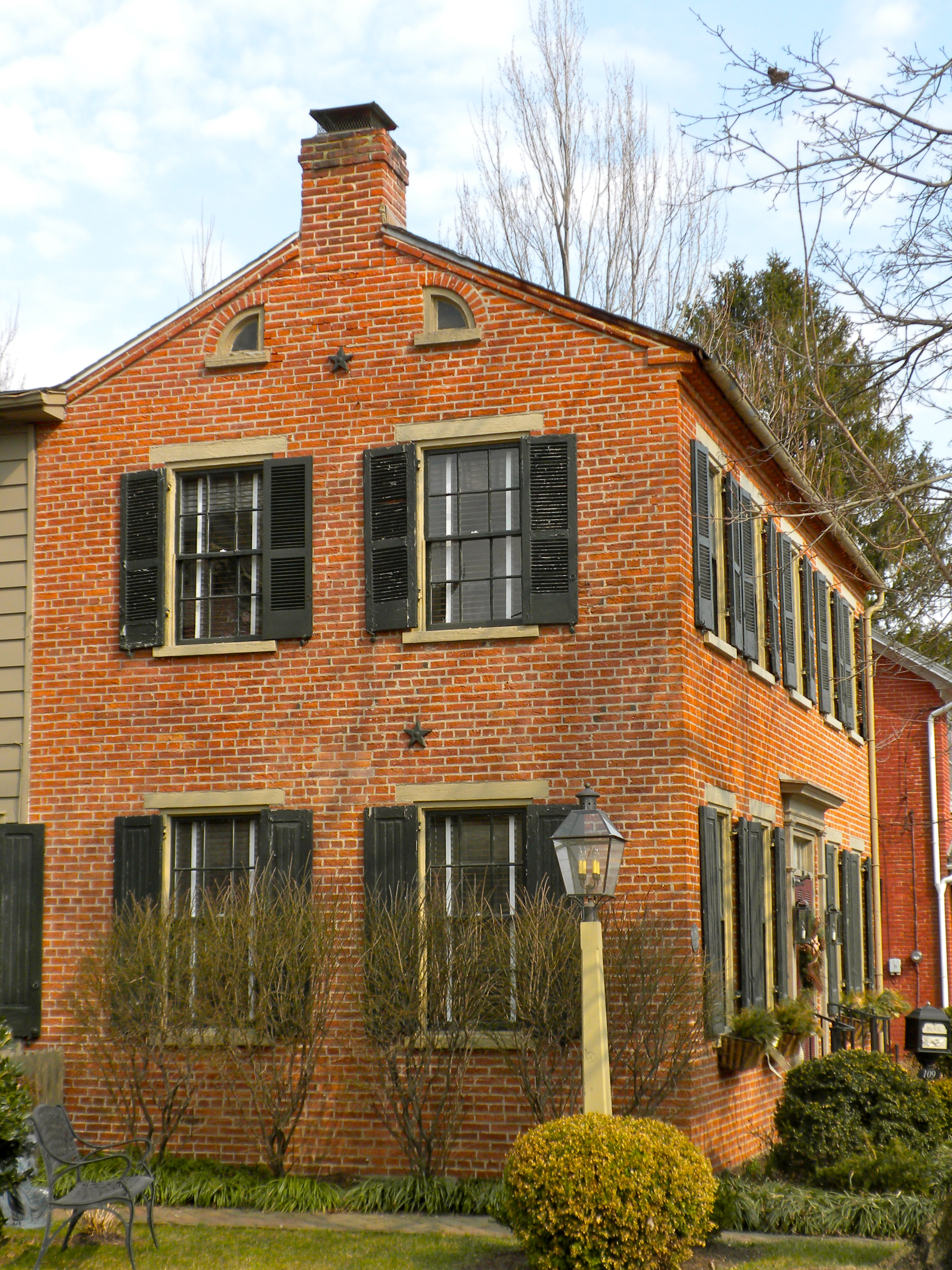
House with star anchor plates

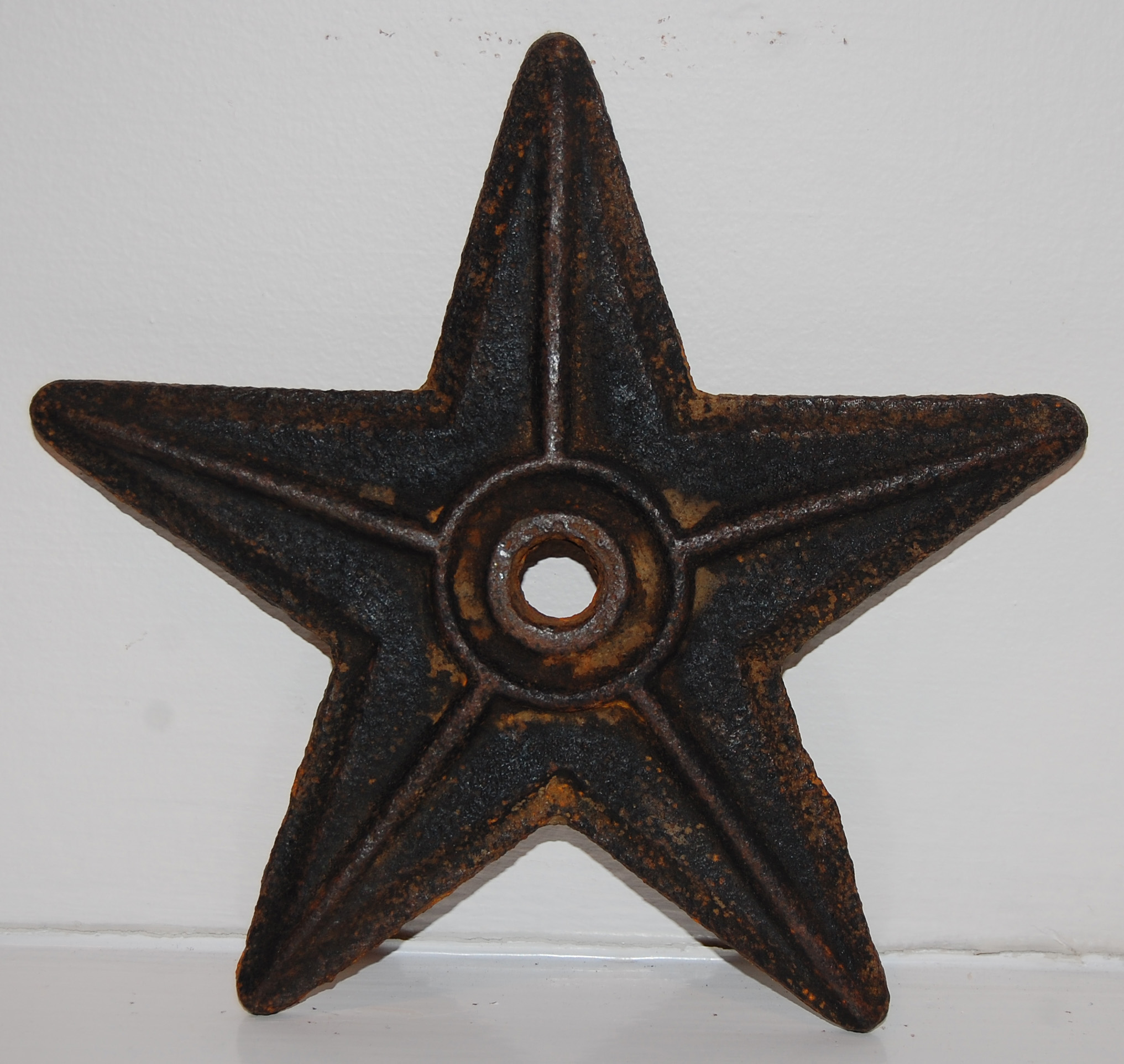
Barnstar anchor plate

== Internet "barnstars" ==
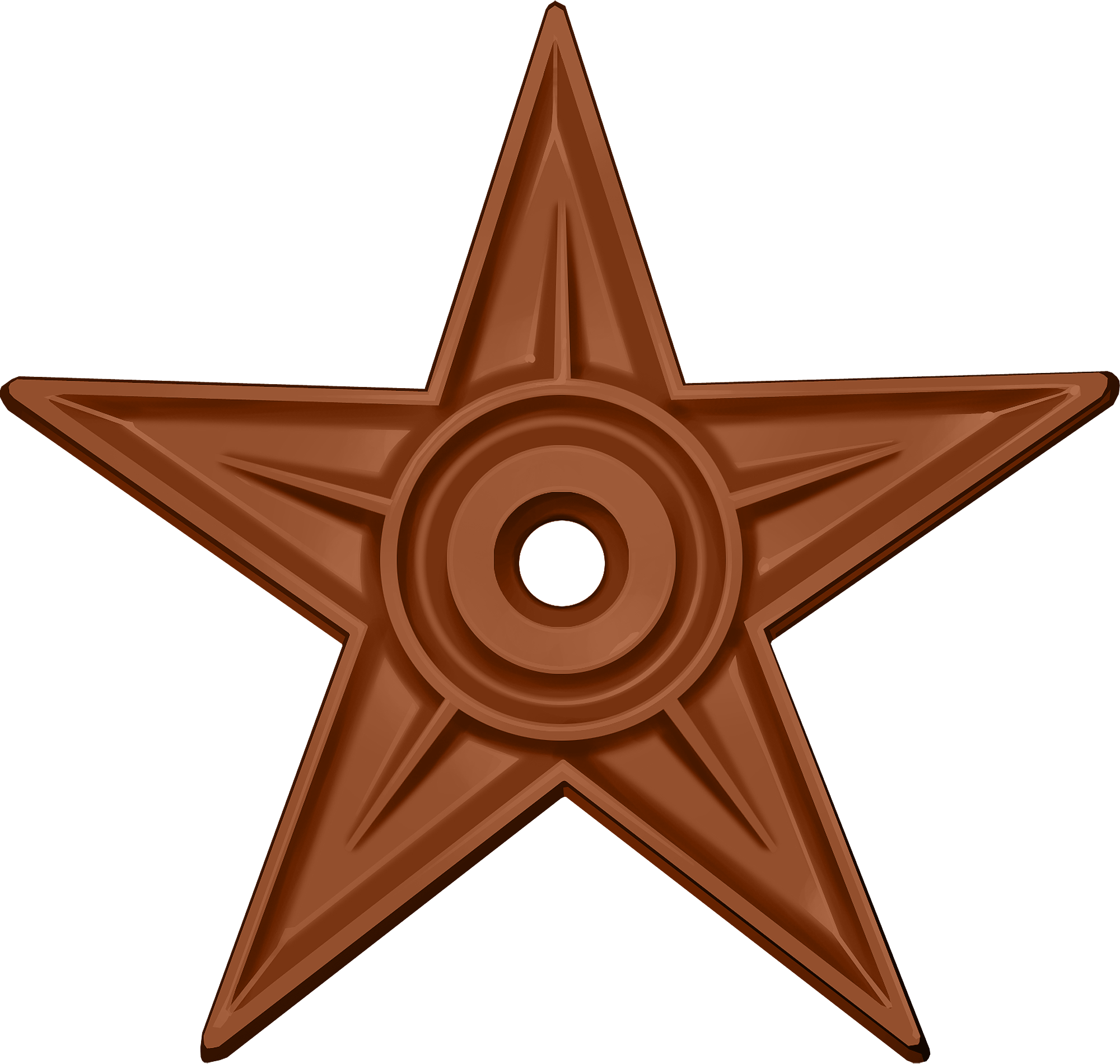
A commonly used "barnstar" image on Wikimedia projects

Some Wiki-based communities give their users an award called a "barnstar" as a continuation of the "barn raising" metaphor. The practice originated on MeatballWiki and was adopted by Wikipedia in 2003. The image that is frequently used for this purpose is actually a stylization of a star-shaped anchor plate and not of a proper barnstar, which is purely decorative.

== See also ==
- Barn quilt
- Hex sign
- Moravian star
- Pentagram
