= The Pertwillaby Papers =

1971-1979 American comic strip

- Author: Don Rosa
- Illustrator: Don Rosa
- Current status/schedule: Concluded
- Launch date: 1971
- End date: 1979
- Genre: Adventure
- Followed by: The Adventures of Captain Kentucky

The Pertwillaby Papers is an adventure comic drawn by Donald Duck artist Don Rosa in the 1970s. The comic is about the adventures of Lancelot "Lance" Pertwillaby and his friends and colleagues around the world.

== History ==
Rosa started drawing the comic in the Kentucky Kernel newspaper in 1971. At the time, it consisted of weekly four- or five-panel episodes. At first, the comic was a political satire, according to the wishes of the newspaper editor, but when the newspaper changed editors, the comic became an adventure series. In 1973, the comic was paused.

In 1976, Rosa continued drawing the comic from episode #128 onwards, for the fanzine Rocket's Blast Comicollector. He changed the comic so that it now consisted of about ten 8- to 12-panel pages per episode. A whole story consisted of five or six episodes. Rocket's Blast Comicollector included episodes #128 through #140, which comprised two whole stories and one which was left unfinished.

Rosa stopped drawing the comic in 1979, because he was not paid for it and had begun to get bored of it. In the early 1980s he drew one more episode (#141) of his unfinished story, but it was not published then.

Except for one story, Rosa re-used the basic storylines of his The Pertwillaby Papers stories in his Disney stories. The stories also include numerous scenes which can be found in his Duck comics.

After his eventful student years, Lancelot Pertwillaby continues his life career as Captain Kentucky.

== Stories ==
- Episodes #1 through #127: Lost in (an Alternative Section of) the Andes – According to Rosa, this story consists of two separate stories, because it is divided so clearly between episodes #1–#65 and #65–#127, the political satire of Lance's admittance into college and his life there, and the treasure hunt to the Andes in the search of the Inca temple of Manco Cápac, that it is more like a two-part story.
  Rosa later remade this story into his first Duck story called The Son of the Sun. Parts were used in Cash Flow and The Last Lord of Eldorado.
- Episodes #128 through #133: Sub-Zero – Lance, together with his friends and enemies, is searching for the sizeable art collection hidden in the North Pole by the Nazis. Part was used in Last Sled to Dawson.
- Episodes #134 through #138: Vortex – Lance and the professor find and capture a black hole, and travel to the centre of the Earth. Rosa later used elements of this story in the Donald Duck story, The Universal Solvent.
- Episodes #139 through #141: Knighttime – Lance is sent to King Arthur's time. This story was left unfinished, but later re-done and completed as The Once and Future Duck. Part was used in The Black Knight.

== Characters ==
- Lancelot "Lance" Pertwillaby is the main character and Rosa's self-portrait. He is a naïve young man who has managed to get into college for free, and doesn't have bad thoughts about anyone, not even Professor Smyte, who repeatedly tries to kill him.
- Feather Fluffnuthin (later renamed Feather Fluff) is Lance's girlfriend, who was at first depicted as a dumb blonde, but later turned out to be a civilized personality who in several respects is smarter than Lance. Feather is present in many of Lance's adventures.
- Viktor Dimitrius Smyte is a professor in Lance's college, who is present in all of Lance's adventures as the main villain. He is a former Nazi scientist and has tried to kill Lance many times, because he fears the boy might uncover his past.
- Schuyler Roatch III is Lance's roommate at the college. He doesn't like Lance, because Pertwillaby's intellect and honesty deposed Schuyler as the most popular student. Schuyler works together with Professor Smyte, but doesn't want to kill Lance, instead he wants to embarrass him and prove that he got into college for free.

The Pertwillaby Papers also includes many supporting characters, such as Lance's best friend and ladies' man Freddie Kegg and Professor Artemis Phoebus, in addition to the notable Martin Bormann. Each main character has a unique, personal speech bubble style.

== Reprints ==
In 1981 Fantagraphics published the Pertwillaby Papers in their two volume series Don Rosa's Comics & Stories.

=== The Don Rosa Archives 1 – The Pertwillaby Papers ===
A reprint of the whole series after the 1970s, including episode #141, was published 2001 in Norway and 2011 in Denmark (in English language). A special edition of the Norwegian book was also made of the books, containing that book and the accompanying edition of Don Rosa's "Captain Kentucky" strips, with Don Rosa's signature and a poster, where Pertwillaby and Captain Kentucky meet each other for the first time. The poster is also signed by Rosa and only 150 copies were made. Both books were also imported to Finland.

=== The Don Rosa Classics ===
In October 2012 the German publisher Dani books released Don Rosa Classics: The Complete Pertwillaby Papers collecting the complete run of the comic in English, ISBN 978-3944077000.
