= Cash Flow (comics) =

- Cover of Uncle Scrooge #224. Art by Don Rosa.
- Story code: AR 106
- Story: Don Rosa
- Ink: Don Rosa
- Hero: Scrooge McDuck
- Pages: 26
- Layout: 4 rows per page
- Appearances: Scrooge McDuck; Donald Duck; Huey, Dewey and Louie; Beagle Boys
- First publication: Uncle Scrooge #224, September 15, 1987

"Cash Flow" is an Uncle Scrooge adventure comic written and drawn by Don Rosa, first published in Uncle Scrooge #224 in December 1987. It was the first of Rosa's stories to feature the Beagle Boys. Like some other comic stories by Don Rosa (such as A Matter of Some Gravity and The Universal Solvent) this story is founded in toying with the physical laws. Rosa says that he got the ideas for these comics from the mechanical engineering courses he took before he became a professional cartoonist.

== Plot ==
To make robbing the Money Bin easier, the Beagle Boys acquire anti-inertia and neutra-friction beam pistols from the foolish cabbage professor (The one who invented the petrifying beam in The Mysterious Stone Ray). Next, they march to the Money Bin while evading all obstacles using the beam pistols, including a barbed-wire fence, dogs, portcullis, automatically triggered machine gun nests, and cannonballs. They advance in that way as far as towards the strongroom.

There, Scrooge snatches the neutra-friction pistol and fires it at his money, making it behave essentially as a liquid. The Beagle Boys are disappointed when they discover that the money masses are too slippery to carry. They tie up the ducks, leave the beam pistols, and go out to create an opening in the vault's wall to allow the money to flow out from the Money Bin. At that time, the ducks exploit the situation, they free themselves from the ropes with the help of the beam pistols. Scrooge hurries to the roof terrace and shoots an anti-inertia beam at the tools the Beagle Boys are using to bust a hole in the wall, which makes their tools useless.

At last the Beagle Boys catch on, and attack simultaneously with many bulldozers. At the same time, the beam gun runs out of power, and the excessive use of the ray guns has weakened the concrete in the walls. The bin cracks like an egg, and the money masses wave over Duckburg and wash down the drain network owned by Scrooge. The ducks leave to rescue the money with Donald Duck's car, which now also is free from inertia and therefore amazingly fast. The money is caught on barges and carried back to the Money bin. Later, Scrooge shoots the Beagle Boys with both beam pistols and then shoves them into prison with a flick of his finger.

Back in the second Money Bin, Scrooge is getting all of his money flowing back inside. Donald reminds him about the deal, where Scrooge promised to give him as many thousand-dollar bills that he can hold if he can protect his money. Scrooge gives them to him, but because the money is still friction-less, the money simply flows out of Donald's arms and back into the vault.
