= Don Rosa =

American comic book writer and illustrator (born 1951)

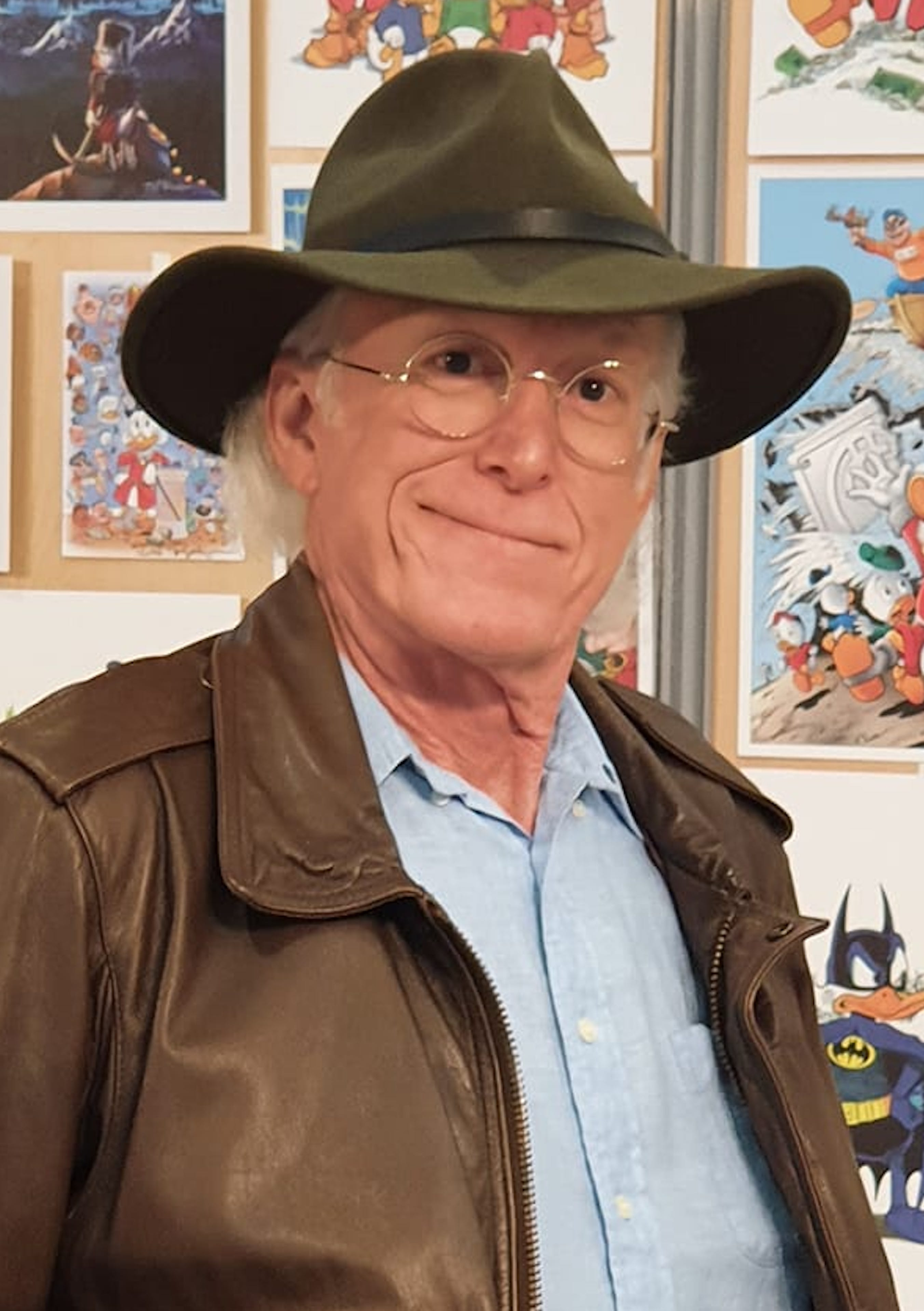
- Rosa in 2022
- Born: Keno Don Hugo Rosa; June 29, 1951 (age 75) Louisville, Kentucky, U.S.
- Area(s): Writer, Penciller, Artist, Inker
- Notable works: "The Son of the Sun" (1987); The Life and Times of Scrooge McDuck (1992–94)
- Awards: Full list
- Spouse: Ann Payne (m. 1980; died 2025)

Keno Don Hugo Rosa (/ˈkiːnoʊ ˈdɒn ˈhjuːɡoʊ ˈroʊzə/), known as Don Rosa (born June 29, 1951), is an American comic book writer and illustrator known for his comics about Scrooge McDuck and other Disney characters. Many of his stories are built on characters and locations created by Carl Barks.

Rosa created about 90 stories between 1987 and 2006, and in 1995 his 12-chapter work The Life and Times of Scrooge McDuck won the Eisner Award for Best Serialized Story.

== Career ==
=== The Pertwillaby Papers and early non-ducks work ===
Rosa's first published comic was an adventure comic strip titled The Pertwillaby Papers created for his college newspaper The Kentucky Kernel in 1971. Rosa graduated from University of Kentucky in 1973 with a bachelor's degree in civil engineering. By the time he graduated, the comic had amassed 127 chapters.

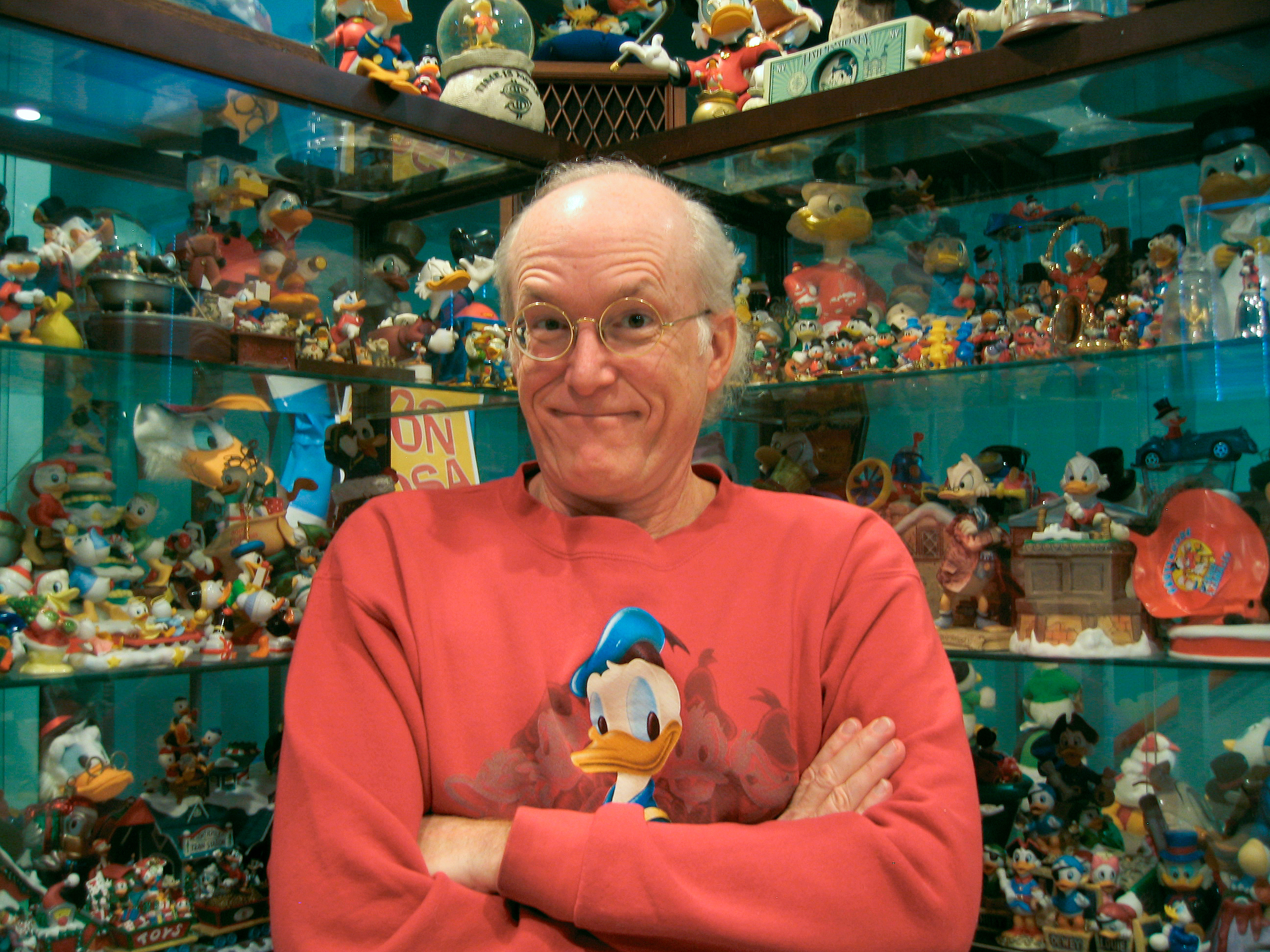
Don Rosa in his home in 2010

While making The Pertwillaby Papers Rosa also contributed art and articles to comic fanzines. One contribution was An Index of Uncle Scrooge Comics. According to his introduction: "Scrooge being my favorite character in comic history and Barks my favorite pure cartoonist, I'll try not to get carried away too much." In 1970, he drew a Donald Duck fancomic titled Return to Duckburg Place, depicting a dark and dystopian vision of the future of Duckburg, and unsuccessfully submitted it to a fanzine for publication.

After attaining his bachelor's degree, Rosa continued to draw comics purely as a hobby, his only income came from working in the Keno Rosa Tile and Terrazzo Company, a company founded by his paternal grandfather.

Rosa authored and illustrated the monthly Information Center column in the fanzine Rocket's Blast Comicollector from 1974 to 1979. This was a question-and-answer feature dealing with readers' queries on all forms of pop entertainment of which Rosa was a student, including comics, TV and movies. He also revived the Pertwillaby Papers in this "RBCC" fanzine as a comic book style story rather than a newspaper comic strip from 1976 to 1978.

Rosa accepted an offer from the editor of the local newspaper to create a weekly comic strip. This led to his creation of the comic strip character Captain Kentucky for the Saturday edition of the local newspaper Louisville Times. Captain Kentucky was the superhero alter ego of Lancelot Pertwillaby. The pay was $25/week and not worth the 12+ hours each week's strip entailed, but Rosa did it as part of his hobby. Publication started on October 6, 1979. The comic strip ended on August 15, 1982, after the publication of 150 episodes. After three years with Captain Kentucky, Don decided that it was not worth the effort. He retired from cartooning and did not draw a single line for the next four years. Years later, as his fame grew, his non-Disney work was published by the Norwegian publisher Gazette Bok in 2001, in the two hard cover "Don Rosa Archives" volumes, The Pertwillaby Papers and The Adventures of Captain Kentucky.

=== Gladstone ===
In 1986, Rosa discovered a Gladstone Comics comic book. This was the first American comic book that contained Disney characters since Western Publishing's discontinuation of their Whitman Comics in the 1970s. Since early childhood, Don Rosa had been fascinated by Carl Barks' stories about Donald Duck and Scrooge McDuck. He immediately called the editor, Byron Erickson, and told him that he was the only American who was born to write and draw one Scrooge McDuck adventure. Erickson agreed to let him send a story, and Don Rosa started drawing his first Duck story, "The Son of the Sun," the very next day.

"The Son of the Sun" was a success and Rosa's very first professional comic story was nominated for a Harvey Award "Best Story of the Year". The plot of the story was the same as his earlier story, Lost in (an alternative section of) the Andes. As Don Rosa explained it, he was just "(...) turning that old Pertwillaby Papers adventure back into the story it originally was in my head, starring Scrooge, Donald, the nephews, and Flintheart Glomgold."

Rosa created a few more comics for Gladstone until 1989. He then stopped working for them because the policies of their licensor, Disney, did not allow for the return of original art for a story to its creators.

After making some stories for the Dutch publisher Oberon, the publishers of an American Disney children's magazine called DuckTales (based on the animated series of the same name) offered Rosa employment. They even offered him much higher page rates than the one he received at Gladstone. Rosa made just one script (Back in Time for a Dime). The publishers never asked him to make more, and due to problems with receiving the payment, he did not care.

=== Egmont ===
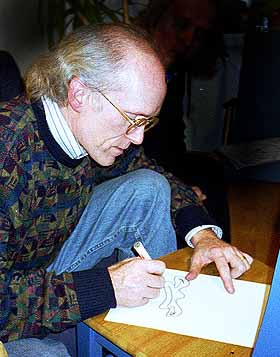
Rosa making a drawing for a fan in Helsinki, Finland, in 1999

After working with the DuckTales magazine, Rosa found out that the Denmark-based International publisher Egmont (at that time called Gutenberghus) was publishing reprints of his stories and wanted more. Rosa joined Egmont in 1990. Two years later, at Rosa's suggestion, Byron Erickson, the former editor at Gladstone, also went to work for Egmont and has been working there ever since as an editor and later as a freelancer.

In 1991 Rosa started creating The Life and Times of Scrooge McDuck, a 12 chapter story about his favorite character. The series was a success, and in 1995 he won an Eisner Award for best continuing series. After the end of the original series, Rosa sometimes produced additional "missing" chapters. Some of the extra chapters were turned down by Egmont, because they were not interested in any more episodes. Fortunately, the French magazine Picsou was eager to publish the stories. From 1999, Rosa started working freelance for Picsou magazine as well. All of these chapters were compiled as The Life and Times of Scrooge McDuck Companion.

=== On strike ===
During early summer 2002, Rosa suddenly laid down work. As an artist, he could not live under the conditions Egmont was offering him but he did not want to give up making Scrooge McDuck comics either. So, his only choice was to go on hiatus and try to come to an agreement with Egmont. His main issues were that he had no control over his works. Rosa had discovered too often that his stories were printed with incorrect pages of art, improper colors, poor lettering, or pixelated computer conversions of the illustrations. Rosa has never, nor has any other artist working on Disney-licensed characters, received royalties for the use or multi-national reprinting of any of his stories worldwide.

Rosa came to an agreement with Egmont in December of the same year, which gave him more control over the stories and the manner in which they were published.

=== Quitting ===
Rosa, who had poor eyesight since childhood, experienced a severe retinal detachment in March 2008, which required emergency eye surgery. However, the surgery was only partially successful, and Rosa had to undergo further surgery in both eyes, making drawing even more challenging. In an interview at the Danish Komiks.dk fair on June 2, 2008, Rosa announced his decision not to continue creating comics due to various reasons such as his eye troubles, low pay, and the use of his stories by international Disney licensees in special hardback or album editions without payment of royalties or permission for the use of his name.

In 2012, Rosa wrote an essay about his retirement for Egmont's 9-volume Don Rosa Collection, which was to be published in Finland, Norway, Germany and Sweden. The essay, posted at career-end.donrosa.de, cites the above reasons, with special emphasis on the "Disney comics system" for paying writers and artists a flat per-page rate, and then allowing publishers around the world to print the stories without payment to the creators.

Rosa is more popular with readers in Europe than in his native United States. According to him, even his next-door neighbors do not know his profession.

== Personal life ==
In 1980, Rosa married Ann Payne (1950–2025). Payne was a middle-school social studies teacher.

=== Character ===
Don Rosa describes himself as an introvert due to being socially isolated as a child. Also, he thinks of himself as a workaholic.

Rosa suffered from depression during the years before he quit. He believes that it was caused by working hard while taking little time for leisure, a result of his self-imposed work regimen due to his enthusiasm for Barks' characters.

=== Hobbies ===
Rosa is a collector of many things, including comic books, TV Guide, National Geographic, and movie magazines, fanzines, books, White Castle memorabilia, pinball machines and movies and more.

Rosa also grows exotic chili plants and tends nearly 30 acres of a private nature preserve with wildflower fields and numerous forest trails. That and taking semi-annual European signing tours to visit his fellow BarksDucks fans, takes up all of his time. He is also working to complete his collections of all American comic books published between 1945 and 1970.

== Work ==
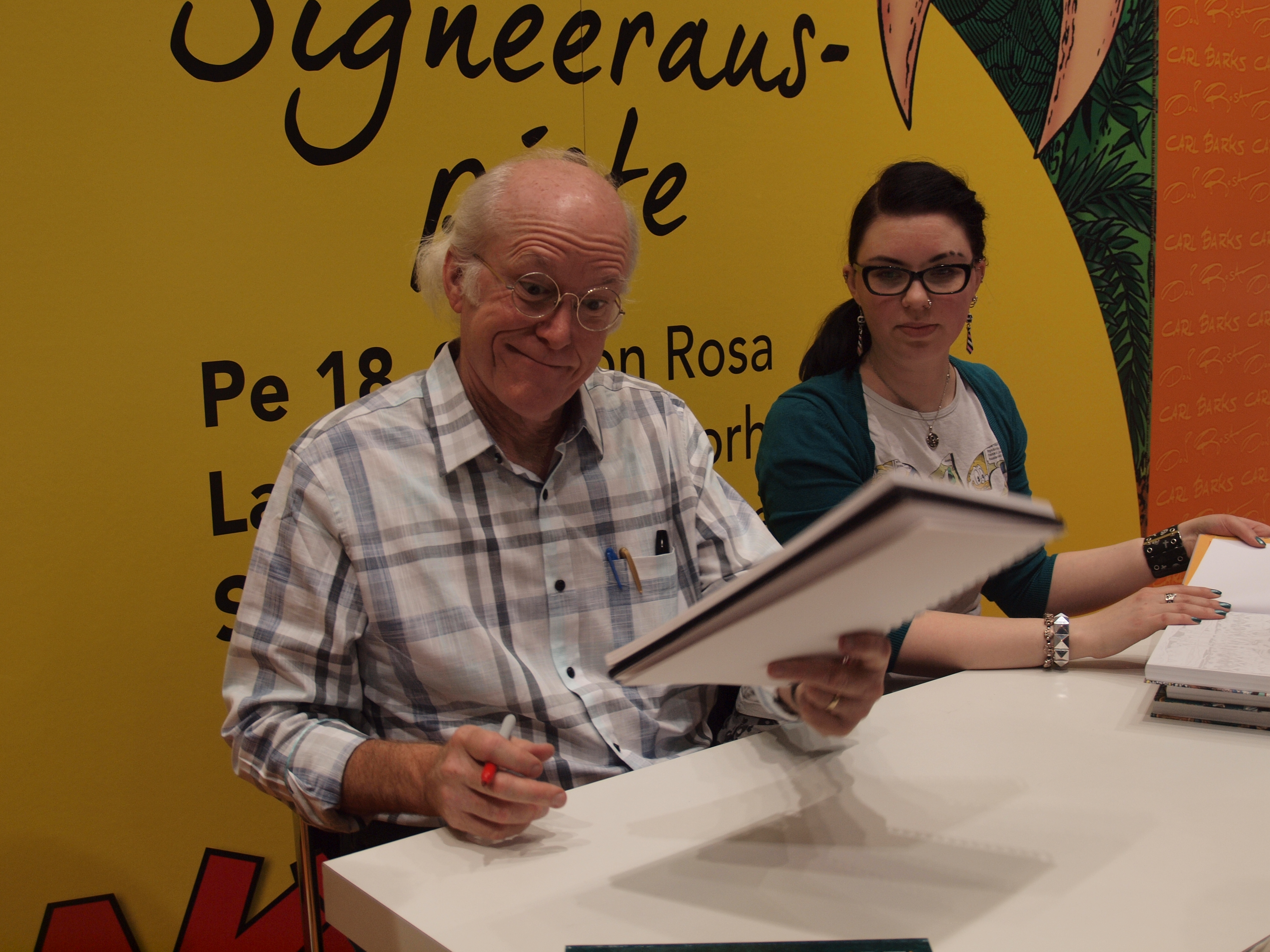
Don Rosa at the Helsinki Book Fair 2014.

In Europe, Rosa is recognized as one of the best Disney comics creators. Carl Barks and Rosa are among the few artists who have their name written on the covers of Disney magazines when their stories are published. Rosa enjoys including subtle references to his favourite movies and comics as well as his own previous work. He normally uses about twelve panels per page, instead of the more common eight.

Rosa has an especially large following in Finland, and in 1999, he created a special 32-page adventure featuring Scrooge McDuck for his Finnish fans called; Sammon Salaisuus (translates to The secret of the Sampo, but it is officially named The Quest for Kalevala in English), based on the Finnish national epic, the Kalevala. The publication of this story created a national sensation in Finland where Donald Duck and the Kalevala are important aspects of culture. It was published in many other countries as well. The cover for the comic book was a spoof of a famous painting by Akseli Gallen-Kallela.

The latest work that Rosa has worked on is a cover for the album Music Inspired by the Life and Times of Scrooge by Tuomas Holopainen from Nightwish who is a fan of Rosa's comics.

=== Drawing style ===
With a Bachelor of Arts degree in civil engineering as his only real drawing education, Rosa has some unusual drawing methods, as he writes: "I suspect nothing I do is done the way anyone else does it."

Because of being self-taught in making comics, Rosa relies mostly on the skills he learned in engineering school, which means using technical pens and templates extensively. He applies templates and other engineering tools to draw what other artists draw freehand. He usually drew just under a page per day, but that depended on the amount of detail he puts in the picture.

Rosa's drawing style is considered much more detailed and "dirtier" than that of most Disney artists, living or dead, and often likened to that of underground artists, and he is frequently compared to Robert Crumb. When Rosa was first told of this similarity, he said that he "drew that bad" long before he discovered underground comics during college. He went on to explain these similarities to underground artists with a similar background of making comics as a hobby:

"I think that both my style and that of Robert Crumb are similar only because we both grew up making comics for our personal enjoyment, without ever taking drawing seriously, and without ever trying to attain a style that would please the average comics publisher. We drew comics for fun!"

=== Carl Barks ===
"I want to take everything Barks wrote and forge it into a workable timeline. My original dream was to become the new Carl Barks. I wanted to write, draw, and letter all my own stories. People tell me that my pencils look just like Barks, but my inks are pure Rosa, and I can't letter properly! So I'll have to settle for being Don Rosa." – Don Rosa in 1987

"Don Rosa has often been called the heir of Carl Barks, especially for the way in which he has carried on the Ducks' Family Saga. But I don't think so: in my opinion Don Rosa [...] is an author who has used Barks' characters to make stories that are completely new, 'Donrosian' rather than 'Barksian', just like Barks can't be considered the heir of Al Taliaferro only because he has worked on the Ducks after him." – Carlo Chendi, Italian Disney comics writer

Rosa's idol when it comes to comics is Carl Barks. Rosa builds almost all his stories on characters and locations that Barks invented. Many of Rosa's stories contain references to some fact pointed out in a Barks story. At the request of publishers in response to reader demands, Rosa has even created sequels of old Barks stories. For example, his Return to Plain Awful is a sequel to Lost in the Andes!, where the Ducks return to the same hidden country. To add more to his admiration and consistency to Barks and Barks' stories, Rosa makes all his ducks' stories set in the 1950s. This is because Barks writes most of the stories about Scrooge, Donald and all people of Duckburg in the 1950s (it also conveniently resolves potential continuity problems, such as Scrooge's age). As explained in text pages in the Life and Times of Scrooge McDuck and its companion volume, Rosa does intense research of time periods to ensure not only that he gets the physical details right, but also to ensure that all characters could have been present.

Barks either created most of the characters used by Rosa or is credited for greatly developing their personalities. Rosa thus feels obliged to make his stories factually consistent. He has spent a lot of time in making lists of facts and anecdotes pointed out in different stories by his mentor. Especially The Life and Times of Scrooge McDuck was based mostly on the earlier works of Barks. Rosa admitted however that a scene of the first chapter was inspired by a story by Tony Strobl.

As most of the characters Rosa uses were created by Barks, and because Rosa considers Scrooge rather than Donald to be the main character of the Duck universe, he does not regard himself as a pure Disney artist, nor the characters really as Disney's. "Rosa prefers to say that the characters he uses are Barks's, Barks having reshaped Donald Duck's personality and creating everything else we know of Duckburg while working as a freelancer in 1942–1967 for an independent licensed publisher (Dell/Western Comics). Barks even claimed to have also created Huey, Dewey, and Louie while working as a writer on Donald Duck animated cartoons in 1937." Because of his idolization of Barks, he repeatedly discourages his fans to use an absolutist way of saying his clearly different drawing style would be better than Barks's, and he found that notion confirmed when Barks himself spoke about Rosa's style in a critical tone though it is uncertain whether those comments were Barks's or those of his temporary "business managers" who filtered his communications.

Unlike his idol Carl Barks, Rosa uses a lot of slapstick and humorously exaggerated facial expressions in his stories. Sequence from Incident at McDuck Tower (Donald and Scrooge #1, 1991, INDUCKS story code D+90345).

"I usually don't like my stories. I mean I try really hard, but I know I don't draw that well. I know people like it because it's got lots of extra details, but art directors know good artwork, and they know mine is not good artwork. Now, people always say, 'You're being too modest, you're being too modest', and I say, 'What?' They just have to ask me the right question. I know it's not good artwork and I don't know if it's well-drawn, but I know it's entertaining." – Don Rosa, Torino Comics Festival, April 2011

"Don Rosa has a style that is a little bit different from the Disney style. I know that there is a great deal of people that like that style, which is extremely detailed. So, there is room in the business for artists like Don Rosa and for others like Van Horn. They have a different style. But if they have a good story and tell it properly, then people are going to like it." – Carl Barks, interview given at Disneyland Paris, July 7, 1994

Beside Rosa's constant effort to remain faithful to the universe Barks created, there is also a number of notable differences between the two artists. The most obvious of these is Rosa's much more detailed drawing style, often with many background gags, which has been credited as being a result of Rosa's love of the Will Elder stories of MAD comics and magazines. While Barks himself discouraged the use of extreme grimacing and gesturing in any other panel for comical or dramatic effect, Rosa's stories are rich with exaggerated facial expressions and physical slapstick. Barks had over 600 Duck stories to his name while Rosa only created 85 until his eye trouble set in, but whereas Barks made many short one and two-pagers centered around a subtle, compact gag, Rosa's oeuvre consists almost exclusively of long adventure stories.

Andrea "Bramo" Bramini identifies the following four differences between Barks's and Rosa's way of storytelling:

- Rosa follows a very strict continuity, while Barks paid very little attention to continuity between stories.
- Rosa's characterization of Scrooge is that of a much more sentimental person for often relishing his memories of past adventures.
- Barks situated his stories in the present day of when he was creating them and had a penchant for satire. Rosa strictly writes stories taking place in an era at least half a century prior to their creation, and mostly abstains from any political or social commentary.
- With his engineering degree, Rosa often goes to great lengths to give scientifically plausible explanations within his stories, whereas Barks never cared much for any detailed scientific rationalizations to his stories.

=== D.U.C.K. ===
Most of Rosa's stories have the letters D.U.C.K. hidden within either the first panel or, if Rosa has created the cover art, within the cover art itself. D.U.C.K. is a backronym for "Dedicated to Unca Carl from Keno" (Carl being Carl Barks and Keno being Rosa's given first name). Due to Disney's refusal to allow artists to sign their work, early Rosa dedications to Barks were deleted as they seemed to be a form of a signature. Later Rosa began hiding the dedication acronym from his editors in various and unlikely places within his drawings.

Rosa has drawn covers for reprints of Carl Barks stories and has included his D.U.C.K. dedication within them as well.

=== Mickey ===
Another curiosity is his Hidden Mickeys. Rosa is only interested in creating stories featuring the Duck family, but he often hides small Mickey Mouse heads or figures in the pictures, sometimes in a humiliating or unwanted situation. An example of this is in the story "The Terror of the Transvaal" where a flat Mickey can be seen under an elephant's foot. Rosa has admitted to neither liking nor disliking Mickey Mouse, but being indifferent to him.

In the story "Attack of the Hideous Space-Varmints", the asteroid with Uncle Scrooge's money bin on it crashes into the Moon along with two missiles, creating a large Mickey Mouse head on the surface. When Huey, Dewey, and Louie tell Donald that the missiles hit the "dark" (far) side of the Moon, Donald is thankful no one is going to see it — "For a minute there, I thought we were going to have some legal problems."

In the second Rosa story featuring The Three Caballeros, Donald Duck is shocked by the sight of a capybara standing on its hind legs, with shrubs, leaves and fruit in front of its body, coincidentally making it look like Mickey Mouse. José Carioca and Panchito Pistoles, never having seen Mickey Mouse, ask Donald what is wrong, but Donald replies he is just tired. Later in the same story, the Caballeros free several animals from a poacher. One panel shows the animals fleeing; Mickey can be seen among them.

In "The Quest for Kalevala", this running gag can be seen on the original, Akseli Gallen-Kallela-inspired cover art. In the original work, Louhi is depicted as bare-chested, but the Disneyfied version has been drawn with a top, of fabric patterned with Mickey Mouse heads.

== Awards ==
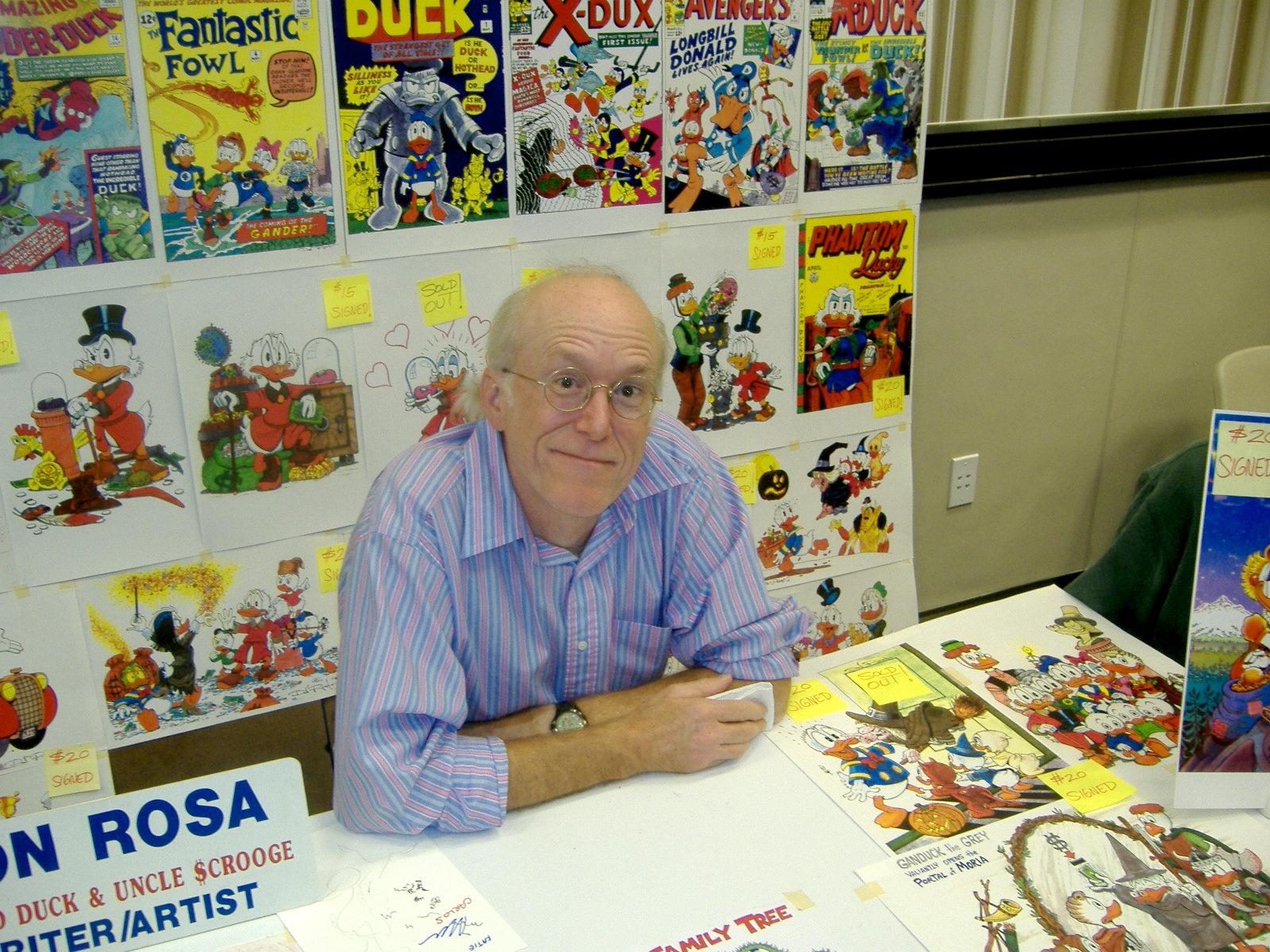
Rosa at Dragon Con, in 2009

His work has won Rosa a great deal of recognition in the industry, including nominations for the Comics' Buyer's Guide Award for Favorite Writer in 1997, 1998, and 1999. Heidi MacDonald of Comics Buyer's Guide also mentioned Rosa's 1994 story "Guardians of the Lost Library" as "possibly the greatest comic book story of all time".

In 1969, while still in college, Rosa won an award as "best political cartoonist in the nation in a college paper". "I'm not really an editorial cartoonist. I'd much rather be doing comedy adventure. But I must have done something right, for at one point The Journal of Higher Education named me one of the five or six best college newspaper cartoonists in the nation."

In 1995, Rosa was awarded the Eisner Award for Best Serialized Story for The Life and Times of Scrooge McDuck. In 1997 he won an Eisner for Best Artist/Writer – Humor category. He was awarded the Inkpot Award in 2014.

Rosa's story "The Black Knight Glorps Again!" was nominated for the 2007 Eisner Award in the category Best Short Story. While "The Prisoner of White Agony Creek", Rosa's latest Duck story to-date, was published in 2006, he was also nominated for the 2007 Harvey Awards in five categories (more than any other creator was that year) for his Uncle Scrooge comics: "Best Writer", "Best Artist", "Best Cartoonist", "Best Cover Artist", and "Special Award for Humor in Comics." In 2013, Rosa received the Bill Finger Award which recognizes excellence in comic book writing for writers who have not received their rightful reward and/or recognition.

International "Best Cartoonist of the Year" awards include:

- Germany: International Grand Prize 2005 (Frankfurt Book Fair).
- Denmark: ORLA Award (DR Television Network).
- Sweden:
  - Svenska Serieakademins (Swedish Comics Academy).
  - Seriefrämjandets Unghunden (Swedish Comics Association).
- Norway: Sproing Award (Norsk Tegneserieforum / Norwegian Comics Forum).
- Italy:
  - Yambo Award (Lucca Comics Festival).
  - 2005 Premio U Giancu's Prize (U Giancu & Rapallo Comics Festival).
- Spain: Haxtur Award (Gijon Comics Festival).

== Biographies ==
Rosa talks about how he began drawing at Copenhagen Comics, 2025

In 1997 the Italian publishing house Editrice ComicArt published a lavish volume about Rosa's biography and work related to the Disney characters. It was titled Don Rosa e il Rinascimento Disneyano ("Don Rosa and the Disneyean Renaissance") and written by famous Disney and Rosa scholars, Alberto Becattini, Leonardo Gori and Francesco Stajano. This work not only discusses all of Rosa's creative life up to 1997, but it also gives a comprehensive biography, lists up to that date his Disney work and presents an extensive interview with Rosa.

In 2009, Danish director Sebastian S. Cordes shot a 75-minute documentary called The Life and Times of Don Rosa, consisting of exclusive interviews with Rosa himself on his farm near Louisville, Kentucky. According to the project's Facebook group, the English-language DVD was released in Denmark on April 16, 2011.

In 2011, Italian Disney fan forum papersera.net published Don Rosa: A Little Something Special (edited by Italian Rosa fan Paolo Castagno), a large folio format, bilingual (Italian and English) book about Rosa's life and work, containing interviews with Rosa and articles by many Italian and European Disney artists, Disney scholars, and established art critics commenting on Rosa's work and career, also including many exclusive, rare Rosa drawings and illustrations. The book was originally made as a gift by papersera.net for Rosa himself upon the occasion of Rosa's April 2011 visit to Turin, Italy.

In 2017 the book, I Still Get Chills!, featuring text by German journalist Alex Jakubowski and photographs by Lois Lammerhuber, was published by Edition Lammerhuber in honour of Rosa's 66th birthday and the 70th anniversary of the first appearance of Scrooge McDuck.

A feature documentary about Don Rosa and Scrooge McDuck by French director Morgann Gicquel titled The Scrooge Mystery was released in December 2017 and was released on DVD and Blu-ray in 2018.

== Comic collections ==
=== United States ===
- The Don Rosa Classics — The Pertwillaby Papers
- The Don Rosa Classics — The Adventures of Captain Kentucky
- The Don Rosa Classics — The Early (So-Called) Art of Don Rosa
- The Don Rosa Library of Uncle Scrooge Adventures in Color Vols. 1–8
- The Life and Times of Scrooge McDuck
- The Life and Times of Scrooge McDuck Companion
- The Barks/Rosa Collection Vols. 1–3
- Walt Disney Treasury: Donald Duck Vols. 1–2
- Uncle Scrooge and Donald Duck: The Don Rosa Library Vols. 1–10
- Don Rosa's The Life and Times of Scrooge McDuck: Artist's Edition Vols. 1–2
- The Complete Life and Times of Scrooge McDuck Vols. 1–2

=== Other countries ===
Apart from the Don Rosa Collection in Germany and Don Rosas Samlade/Samlede Verk and Don Rosan kootut in the Nordic nations, the following collections only contain Rosa's work for Disney.

Country	Collection	Year	Remarks
Brazil	— Tio Patinhas e Pato Donald – Biblioteca Don Rosa 1-10	2017–2020	
Denmark	— Hall of Fame: Don Rosa – bog 1–10 — Don Rosas Samlede Værker 1–9	2004–2009; 2014–2015	Including non-Disney comics
Finland	— Don Rosan Parhaita — Don Rosan kootut 1–9	1995–2010; 2011–2013	Including non-Disney comics
France	— La jeunesse de Picsou 1-2/Les trésors de Picsou 3–7 — Intégrale Don Rosa 1–7	2004–2008; 2012–2016	
Germany	— Onkel Dagobert von Don Rosa 0–32 — Hall of Fame: Don Rosa 1–8 — Don Rosa Collection 1–9 — Don Rosa Library 1–10	1994–2006; 2004–2011; 2011–2013; 2020–2022	Incomplete; Including non-Disney comics
Greece	— Βιβλιοθήκη Κόμιξ vol 1-6	2008–2012	Not including The Life and Times of Scrooge McDuck and The Life and Times of Scrooge McDuck Companion collections and the story A Little Something Special
Indonesia	— Komik Petualangan Paman Gober Karya Don Rosa 1–8	2011	Incomplete
Italy	— The Don Rosa Library - Zio Paperone & Paperino — Don Rosa Library De Luxe	2017–2019; 2019-2022	Both reprints of the Fantagraphics library, the first one is composed of 20 economic paperback volumes, the second one is composed of 10 hardback volumes
Netherlands	— Oom Dagobert 53–74 — Het levensverhaal / De reisavonturen van Dagobert Duck	1996–2005; 2013–2019	Incomplete (only upper collection)
Norway	— Hall of Fame: Don Rosa – bok 1–10 — Don Rosa Samlede Verk 1–9	2004–2010; 2011–2013	Including non-Disney comics
Poland	— Komiksy z Kaczogrodu: Życie i czasy Sknerusa McKwacza — Życie i czasy Sknerusa McKwacza — Wujek Sknerus i Kaczor Donald 1-10	2000; 2017; 2019-2022	
Russia	— Дядюшка Скрудж и Дональд Дак - Библиотека Дона Росы	2017–2019	
Sweden	— Hall of Fame: Don Rosa – bok 1–10 — Don Rosas samlade verk 1–9 — Don Rosa-biblioteket 1–10	2004–2009; 2011–2013; 2020–	Including non-Disney comics

== See also ==
- List of Disney comics by Don Rosa
- Donaldism
- Donald Duck universe
- Clan McDuck
- List of people from the Louisville metropolitan area
