= Guardians of the Lost Library =

1993 Junior Woodchucks comic book story by Don Rosa

- Original cover of "Guardians of the Lost Library". Art by Don Rosa
- Story: Don Rosa
- Ink: Don Rosa
- Hero: The Junior Woodchucks
- Pages: 28
- Layout: 4 rows per page
- Appearances: The Junior Woodchucks; Scrooge McDuck; General Snozzie; Donald Duck; Grand Mogul
- First publication: Uncle Scrooge Adventures #27; July, 1994

"Guardians of the Lost Library" is a 1993 comic book story made by Don Rosa for The Walt Disney Company, mentioned by Comics Buyer's Guide as "possibly the greatest comic book story of all time". Although afraid at the time of its creation of cramming too many historical details into the story, Rosa himself mentions in Uncle Scrooge #383 (November, 2008) that in fan mail he receives to this day, "Guardians of the Lost Library" to his own surprise is often referred to as "'the best Rosa story' or 'the best Duck story' or even 'the best comic book story' (?!!) that fans say they've ever read."

In this story Scrooge McDuck, Huey, Dewey and Louie, and General Snozzie search for the Lost Library of Alexandria. This story was Don Rosa's first use of General Snozzie, the Junior Woodchucks bloodhound.

The story was first published in the Danish Anders And & Co. #1993-42; the first American publication was in Uncle Scrooge Adventures #27, in July 1994.

== Background ==
Rosa created "Guardians of the Lost Library" at the request of Scandinavia-based, European Disney publisher Egmont in reference to the fact that Norway had officially declared 1993 to be "The Year of The Book" in order to promote reading (as the story was published in Norway and Denmark in 1993, one year prior to its first edition in the original English). Rosa figured that he would honor the written word best by sending the Ducks on an epic quest for the Library of Alexandria, where he:

"could show the evolution of books from papyrus scrolls through parchment tomes and the first Gutenberg volumes on up to the present day. [...] In the process, it was easy to show how books have recorded and even inspired the advancements of science and art through the ages [...]. And what could be better than for the key to tracing the Library around the world be that most famous mythical book of all - the Junior Woodchuck Guidebook?!"

== Plot ==
Donald Duck and his nephews go to the new Woodchuck Museum to see the exhibit on artifacts from the first Junior Woodchucks. The nephews are particularly enthusiastic about an old, worn, massive volume that is the oldest known copy of the Junior Woodchucks Guidebook.

Scrooge McDuck is also there to get a copy of the Guidebook, which he knows contains an enormous wealth of information. However, the scoutmaster refuses, on the regulation that McDuck is too old to join the organization, and only members are allowed to read its guidebook. Also the scoutmaster suspects, correctly, that Scrooge would use the information mainly to enrich himself, as he has recently done by acquiring the entire log books of the 16th century Spanish fleet to find lost treasures. Scrooge tells the nephews that he would like to find the Library of Alexandria for the same purpose. The head of The Junior Woodchucks organization agrees to sponsor Scrooge's trip in the name of science as well as lend out General Snozzie, the Woodchucks bloodhound. Scrooge and the nephews set out to find the lost library, leaving behind Donald totally oblivious to the events as he sits constantly glued to the TV, currently holding the occupation of Scrooge's Money Bin guard.

They set out to Egypt, where they find an underground chamber with a million bronze tubes containing the original scrolls of the Library of Alexandria. Unfortunately, it turns out that the scrolls have long crumbled to dust. Cleopatra had however founded a special organization, "The Guardians of the Great Library", to protect the unique book collection. Still in operation centuries later, the Guardians had extensive parchment copies made of the contents of the library, which were shipped to Byzantium, Greece around 400 AD, to become known as the Library of Constantinople.

In Istanbul, modern-day Turkey, these "100,000 parchment scrolls" ("perhaps they left out the plays and poetry") once were "the light of the Dark Ages for 800 years" and had "the books from the great libraries of Islam" added to them over time. However, the entire collection finally perished in a fire. Yet the contents survived, since for centuries the Orthodox monks had copied them into the modern technology of 10,000 manuscripts (with each hand-written book holding 10 original scrolls). This Byzantine Library of manuscripts was however stolen in 1204 in the Sack of Constantinople during the Fourth Crusade, with crusader knights bringing the books to Venice.

In Venice, these books were kept in an abbey whose library henceforth "sparked the Renaissance", inspired "Leonardo and Michelangelo", and motivated Marco Polo and his father to journey to the Orient, paying back the library by adding the Great Books from Kublai Khan's Empire of Cathay to it upon Marco's return. The Venice Library was lost in 1485 during the collapse of the abbey's bell tower, but following the invention of movable type printing by Johannes Gutenberg in 1439, the rotting books had been saved in their entirety by making their first typeset copy "of about 1,000 volumes", with each typeset book containing 10 manuscripts.

Inspired by Phoenician accounts dating 600 BCE of rich new lands beyond the Western ocean in the books, Lorenzo de Medici sent a bookdealer named Cristobal Colon in 1484 to buy these 1,000 volumes, but Colon never turned the books over to the Medici family. When Scrooge and the nephews find out that the English name of this bookdealer-turned sailor happens to be Christopher Columbus and that Columbus's private library is in Seville, Spain, Scrooge is pacing out the door, "already halfway across France".

In the Biblioteca Colombina, they are forced to decipher Columbus' private notes hand-written in a secret, unknown code by means of the Woodchuck Guidebook, to find out Columbus had the library moved to Santo Domingo in 1498, far from the reach of the Medici and the Spanish King, but Ferdinand II of Aragon soon found out and had Columbus put into chains.

Scrooge and the nephews hurry back to Duckburg (where they encounter Donald still in front of the TV, making condescending remarks about their passion for "some dusty old library books") to search Scrooge's above-mentioned Spanish logs to find out whether the library had ever been removed from the island. Apparently, Francisco Pizarro had it moved to his new capital, modern-day Lima, Peru in 1535, where beginning in 1551, the scholars at San Marcos University added "all the knowledge of the Mayans, Aztecs, Incas, and Olmecs". When the Spanish tried to send the library home to Spain in 1579, the ships were captured by Sir Francis Drake. As the battle had damaged his own ship, Drake was forced to go ashore on the coast of Nova Albion, founding Fort Drake Borough which later became Duckburg, for the sole purpose of burying the library below the fort, on Killmotor Hill where Scrooge built his Money Bin in 1902 (see Fort Duckburg).

Hurrying into old caves and bricked gangways Scrooge never explored before below the Bin, they find a large crypt full of old books. On closer inspection, only the covers are left, since the vellum pages turn out to have been eaten by rats. Scrooge is furious because the library seems to have perished once and for all.

However, in the middle of the room stands a metal case, with the emblem of the Guardians of the Lost Library our heroes first saw in Egypt: an Ibis symbolizing Thoth, the Egyptian deity of wisdom and writing. An inscription on a metal plate by the last survivor of Drakeborough tells how he, on Drake's orders, had the library condensed into one single volume with every information no other surviving book in the world included. As the Lost Library's last guardian, he had this one book sealed into this rat-proof metal box. Scrooge is triumphant that the unique essence of the library seems to have survived after all, but upon opening the box he is deeply frustrated to find it empty.

The nephews stitch the remaining puzzle together: the British didn't find the library when they reoccupied Drakeborough, but Cornelius Coot, the founder of the City of Duckburg, found it during the late 18th century, and left the book to his son Clinton Coot, the founder of the Junior Woodchucks. The very volume that was on display in the Woodchuck Museum at the beginning of the story, it was used as the framework for the Junior Woodchuck's Guidebook, the only one book in the world Scrooge cannot buy. This not only explains why the Guidebook facilitated them to follow the trail of the Lost Library all over the world with its enormous knowledge base, but also the fact the Junior Woodchuck's logo, based on the letters J and two Ws, looks uncannily like the inverted Ibis emblem of the Guardians of the Lost Library.

Later on, Scrooge comments on how depressed he is about not getting the books he has traveled all over the globe for, until the boys remind him that he would have had to turn the library over to Alexandria. Scrooge gets excited about how much money he saved on the fine he would have had to pay otherwise for 1,000,000 library scrolls each overdue for 2,000 years, and Donald complains about the noise drowning out the TV, muttering "Cripes! They're still going on about their stupid library! As if messing with books was as interesting as watching TV! Hah! That'll be the day!"

== Historical accuracy ==
The story contains at least one potential historical error: It apparently claims that Alexander the Great intended Alexandria to be the capital of his empire. Actually, he built it to be the capital of Egypt but not of the entire empire. Babylon was the capital of Alexander's empire, even though Alexandria became the capital of the diadochic Ptolemaic Kingdom under Alexander's immediate successor Ptolemy I Soter.

The exact quote found in "Guardians of the Lost Library", "The city was founded by Alexander the Great in the fourth century B. C. to be the capital of his empire!" is a bit ambiguous, meaning either that it was Alexander's direct personal intention or that it was about to happen independently of whatever Alexander had intended.

== Disney and in-universe references ==
=== Disney reference ===
Scrooge makes a reference to Mickey Mouse not being published anymore. That was true during the time this story was first published but it was mainly used as an inside joke.

=== Duckburg genealogy ===
The names Fulton Gearloose and Clinton Coot were first used in this story but it was not revealed that they were the fathers of Gyro Gearloose and Grandma Duck, respectively.

=== Other stories by Don Rosa ===
"Guardians of the Lost Library" was later referenced in Part 10: The Invader of Fort Duckburg (1994), of Don Rosa's The Life and Times of Scrooge McDuck where in 1902 the first three Junior Woodchucks are expelled from their former headquarter, the ruins of Fort Duckburg recently bought by Scrooge. As the boyscouts walk down Killmotor Hill, along with some JWC pennants they carry a large, old volume with the Iris Emblem of the Guardians of the Lost Library with them. One of the Junior Woodchucks says "Someday we've just got to make pocket-size copies of this monster!"

As the condensed book passed on by the last survivor of Drakeborough and found by Clinton Coot is the framework for the first edition of the Junior Woodchucks Guidebook, in Rosa's later story The Lost Charts of Columbus (1995), the Junior Woodchucks intend to raise funds for excavations at the site of Cleopatra's hidden library in Egypt before it was brought to Byzantium. So they organize a raffle and Gladstone Gander wins a fishing trip to Canada, where he recovers the Golden Helmet from Barks's eponymous story, allowing Azure Blue to resume his plans of owning North America. Above-mentioned ancient Phoenician accounts of the Americas having inspired Lorenzo de Medici and Christopher Columbus in "Guardians of the Lost Library" are revisited in this story as well.

== Publication history ==
Cover to Uncle $crooge #383, November 2008, "Guardians of the Lost Library" – original cover art by Don Rosa

"Guardians of the Lost Library" was first published in Uncle Scrooge Adventures #27, July, 1994. Compared to European prints, this original English-language edition was of a poor quality where on a number of pages the CMYK printing plates had been misaligned resulting in more than obvious color fringing.

The story was eventually re-published at a higher printing quality in Gemstone's 60 Years of Uncle $crooge celebratory edition Uncle Scrooge #383, November, 2008 (which turned out to be Gemstone's ultimate Disney comic publication, as Boom! Kids was about to take over publishing Disney's classic characters starting September, 2009). Again, original art by Rosa was used for the cover, however the artwork used for the 2008 reprint had been initially made by Rosa not specifically as cover art but as part of a series of collectibles related to his stories that had been originally published by French Disney magazine Picsou Magazine in 2004. While the 2008 reprint featured a superior printing quality and the 2008 cover was shaded as usual with North American Disney comics, with the reprinted story itself Gemstone replaced Gladstone Publishing's 1994 finer-graded colorization featuring many soft gradients with Egmont's European solid-hue color scheme.
