= Dick Kinney =

American screenwriter (1916–85)

Richard Timothy Kinney (December 15, 1916 – March 24, 1985) was an American animator and comic book writer. His comic book work was mostly in Disney comics, writing stories featuring Donald Duck and Scrooge McDuck. He was the writer who, along with artist Al Hubbard, created Fethry Duck and Hard Haid Moe. Kinney is the younger brother of fellow Disney animator Jack Kinney.

Earlier, as an animation writer, Kinney was part of the story crew on various Disney, Walter Lantz Productions, UPA, Paramount Cartoon Studios and Jack Kinney Productions/King Features Syndicate theatrical and TV cartoons. The Lantz cartoon Niagara Fools, featuring Woody Woodpecker, represented perhaps Kinney's most fondly-remembered original storyline. Later, Kinney would remake the story for comics with Fethry Duck in, essentially, the Woody role.

== Legacy ==
Rotten Tomatoes presents him as follows "While some animators from the golden age of Hollywood studio cartoons have gained renown, few story men have been hailed for their achievements. Dick Kinney is a significant figure in this unsung field. He is best known for his work at the Walt Disney Studio with his brother, animation director Jack Kinney, on the highly regarded series of Goofy sports cartoons made during the 1940s."
