= The Lost Charts of Columbus =

The Lost Charts of Columbus, Norwegian edition cover. Art by Don Rosa.

"The Lost Charts of Columbus" is a 1995 Donald Duck comic by Don Rosa, a sequel to Carl Barks' 1952 story The Golden Helmet.

The story was first published in the Danish Anders And & Co. #1995-42; the first American publication was in Donald Duck Adventures #43, in April 1997.

== Plot ==
The Junior Woodchucks organized a raffle in order to raise funds to further research on the original Junior Woodchucks Guidebook, based on findings made by an expedition sponsored by Scrooge McDuck in Guardians of the Lost Library and offered a trip as first prize. Donald Duck doesn't understand why they bother to organize a raffle in Duckburg, since Gladstone Gander always wins. He's then told that the winner for this one must be there to get the prize, thus inspiring him on how to keep Gladstone from winning.

Acting quickly, Donald tricks Gladstone into a knot-making machine. While he was out, the Junior Woodchucks R.A.F.F.L.E.R. draws a ticket and picks Donald Duck as the winner. Since he wasn't there because he was busy trying to keep Gladstone away, Donald is disqualified and another raffle ticket had to be picked. Soon, Gladstone becomes the new winner. At this point, Donald arrives and doesn't know his name had been previously picked. Gladstone escapes from the machine on time to get the prize and asks where's he going for the trip. He's disappointed as it was a fishing trip to Canada. Donald commented about how unfair it is. One of his nephews tried to tell him about Donald being previously picked, but another one said "he's better not knowing".

Gladstone, wanting to know why he won such a prize, invites Donald to go with him. Donald's nephews asked him to accept, since this trip is to where they're going to study the chart, located in the original Junior Woodchucks Guidebook. There, a fisherman feels sorry for Gladstone not getting any fish, but he replies by saying he's learned there's another purpose for the trip: recovering valuable objects from the sea. One of them turns out to be the Golden Helmet. The fisherman said he had spent a lot of time and money trying to get it. He's surprised that Gladstone got it just by seer luck. The fisherman tells them the history behind this helmet. Donald asks how he knows about it and the fisherman reveals himself to be Azure Blue.

Donald then tells Gladstone a very summarized version of their original adventure, and asks him to throw the helmet back at sea. Blue suggests Gladstone throw something else in (i.e. Donald). Meanwhile, the nephews discover the lost charts of Christopher Columbus and maps of other claims to North America. Afterwards, Donald asks them to find one older than Olaf's. Back in Duckburg, our heroes see Gladstone leaving a press conference and ask him if he was claiming ownership of North America. Gladstone says he doesn't want the responsibility of being a landlord and that he isn't a descendant of Olaf the Blue. Azure is announcing his claim when Donald and his nephews tell the press about an older claim made by an abbot, Saint Brendan, which nullifies Olaf's plan.

Unfortunately, this causes a lot of people to search for evidence of this claim in order to own North America. The artifact which proves this claim was later found by Lawyer Sharky, who, since the abbot took a vow of chastity, instead of trying to prove to be related to him restored his congregation and claimed ownership of North America in its name. His victory, just like Azure's, was also short-lived as the nephews find an even older claim made by a Chinese explorer named Hui-Shen.

At this point, Azure Blue decides to give the Golden Helmet to our heroes, as it's no longer useful for his plans of world domination by controlling America. The quest for ownership of North America leads our heroes to the ruins of Teotihuacan, where they find a big old teak wheel proving this claim. Sharky finds it and our heroes (mainly Donald) have a lot out trouble keeping him from destroying the wheel. When Sharky finally gets the wheel, Azure shows up trying to get the clam and tell Sharky it's too late to destroy the wheel since many witnesses have already seen it. Sharky says he found a way to use the wheel to make them both emperors of North America, and brings out their contract Sharky recovered after learning Blue recovered the Golden Helmet.

After the villains leave, the nephews recall that Columbus believed there are other maps that were never copied. As such, they suspect that the Guardians of the Lost Library may have held a chart made in leather and return to Alexandria to find out. There, they learn about an even older claim supposedly made by an ancient civilization (which they theorize to be the Phoenicians). Meanwhile, in a Brutopian hotel, Blue and Sharky are waiting until they have letters from enough descendants of the Chinese explorer to be allowed to rule America in their names. Upon learning from the newspapers about our heroes' discovery, which led them back to the Library of Alexandria (see Guardians of the Lost Library for details), Blue and Sharky go to a desert land where, on the remains of an old Native American ship, our heroes have found a stone tablet containing a claim that predates, and thus nullifies, their other ones.

After retrieving the tablet from our heroes, the villains throw away the wheel (now useless) and decide to use the tablet to rule North America for themselves instead of for the descendants of the Chinese explorer. During the press conference at their hotel, a mysterious reporter asks our villains if they now consider the other claims null and void. Sharky says yes, as they were misled by false information. For their finale, Azure and Sharky summon a university professor to translate the Punic script on the tablet. The professor looks at the tablet and says the language is not Punic at all. The reporter opens his trench coat and reveals himself to be Donald and his nephews (standing on Donald's shoulders), translating the language as Native American, meaning the tablet is, likewise, native to the Americas and cannot be used to stake a claim. Since Blue and Sharkey have now disavowed their earlier claims, they have nothing left. Eventually, both are arrested for failing to pay the enormous bills they incurred for the Brutopian hotel's services, and the several ads taken out in China to contact the Chinese explorer's descendants.

In the epilogue, Donald and his nephews look at the tablet upside-down and learn it's actually a claim to Europe, made by Native American explorers who sailed east and discovered "a new world" - meaning that, by Europe's own Charlemagne Laws, the Native Americans own Europe. Donald and his nephews comment about how it will finally make the U.N. revoke the Code of Discovery law. In the corner of the last panel, a portrait of Columbus is shown wrinkling his face in disgust.
