= List of Donald Duck universe characters =

The following Disney cartoon and comics characters in the Donald Duck universe typically appear with Donald Duck and Scrooge McDuck, but are not related to them. For relatives of Donald and Scrooge, see Duck family (Disney) or Clan McDuck. For characters exclusive to the DuckTales franchise, see List of DuckTales characters.

== Main characters ==
- Donald Duck
- Daisy Duck
- Huey, Dewey, and Louie
- Scrooge McDuck
- Ludwig Von Drake

== Relatives ==
- Duck family (Disney)
- Clan McDuck

== Duck characters ==
Ducks are the most common type of named characters in the Donald Duck universe. Like Donald, they appear as white American Pekin ducks. This section contains a list of characters with the surname "Duck" who are not related to Donald. Disney illustrator Don Rosa has said that "Duck" is a common name in Duckburg (just as "Smith" or "Jones" are common in the real-life United States) and does not necessarily identify a blood relation of Donald.

=== Donna Duck ===
Donna Duck is the first love interest of Donald Duck. She was later replaced by Daisy Duck. According to some sources, Daisy was introduced in 1937 as Donna Duck, yet there is conflicting evidence as to whether Donna was an early version of Daisy or a separate character entirely. However, the fact that The Walt Disney Company released a collector's pin (See #703 on Pinpics.com) in 1999 which states, "Daisy Duck debuts as Donna Duck 1937," solidifies the fact that Daisy Duck and Donna Duck were, in fact, one and the same.

Donna made her sole animated appearance in the short film Don Donald (1937), directed by Ben Sharpsteen. It was the first installment of the Donald Duck film series and was also the first time Donald was shown with a love interest. In the story, Donald travels to Mexico to court a duck who is largely a female version of himself. She is portrayed with the same feisty temperament and impatience and was even voiced by Donald's voice actor Clarence Nash. At the end of the story she spitefully abandons Donald in the desert after his car breaks down.

Some sources consider Don Donald, Daisy's debut. These include The Encyclopedia of Animated Disney Shorts, and the Big Cartoon DataBase. In addition to this, Don Donald is included on the Disney-produced DVD "Best Pals: Donald and Daisy." Donna's identification as an early Daisy is aided by the fact that other Disney characters, such as Goofy, were also introduced under different names (Dippy Dawg), appearances, and mannerisms. "Donna" in Italian is also the equivalent of "Don," a title Donald takes in the film's title.

However, in 1951 the character of Donna was retconned in a newspaper comic strip where she appeared as a separate character from Daisy, and as an unwitting rival for Donald's affections.

=== Gladstone Gander ===
Gladstone Gander is Donald's lucky cousin who is always flirting with Daisy Duck. Gladstone first appeared in "Wintertime Wager" in Walt Disney's Comics and Stories #88 (Jan 1948), written and drawn by Carl Barks.

=== April, May, and June ===
April, May, and June (their surname is unknown) are the triplet nieces of Daisy Duck. They were created by Carl Barks and were first used in the story "Flip Decision", published in Walt Disney's Comics and Stories #149 (Feb 1953). According to their debut story, they live in Duckburg with their parents, though they do not appear in the comic. Their mother is a sister of Daisy. When they appear at family gatherings their parents are never present and they usually accompany Daisy.

In some stories, mostly Dutch, they live along with their aunt, but in other comics, such as the comics by Barks, they are only visiting Daisy. The triplets act as Donald's nephews' (Huey, Dewey, and Louie Duck) female counterparts, occasional rivals, occasional friends, and occasional dates. They are members of the organization The Junior Chickadees, who serve as The Junior Woodchucks' female counterparts. Unusually for children of their age, the girls routinely wear high-heeled shoes.

Like the nephews, April, May & June usually wear the colors red, blue and green, but unlike them, a color assignment has never been established. The girls also frequently wear yellow, purple and orange. However, one might consider "blue" to be April's color since that was the color she wore when she appeared solo in "Dell Giant" #35. It is also unknown which nephew is paired with which niece when they double date with their Uncle Donald and Aunt Daisy.

In 1998, the editors of the Dutch Donald Duck weekly magazine decided the three girls should be modernized, and they got permission from the Disney Company to do so. Dutch Duck comic artist Mau Heymans designed a new hairdo and new wardrobe for April, May and June. The three now have distinct appearances and do not have the "girly" occupations that they had when Barks created them. In some Danish Egmont-produced stories, the new hairdo has been copied by other artists.

April, May, and June were not seen in animation until they were given a special cameo appearance in the House of Mouse episode "Ladies' Night". They would later appear as regular cast members in the 2018 animated series Legend of the Three Caballeros (all three voiced by Jessica DiCicco).

The 1987 television series DuckTales, the character Webby Vanderquack resembles April, May, and June in appearance. This would be referenced in the series finale of the 2017 DuckTales series "The Last Adventure!", in which the real name of its version of Webby (voiced by Kate Micucci) is revealed to be April, while the series versions of May and June (voiced by Riki Lindhome and Noël Wells respectively) are clones of Webby, who is in turn a clone of Scrooge McDuck.

April, May, and June returned to American comics in Walt Disney's Comics and Stories #698. The story had them retelling "Little Red Riding Hood" with the girls as Red and the Beagle Boys as the wolf.

=== Flintheart Glomgold ===
Flintheart Glomgold is Scrooge's archenemy and the second richest duck in the world. The character was created by Carl Barks in the 1956 story "The Second-Richest Duck".

=== Fethry Duck ===
Fethry Duck is the son of Lulubelle Loon and Eider Duck (a son of Grandma Duck) and is the beatnik cousin of Donald Duck. He was created for the Disney Studio Program by Dick Kinney and Al Hubbard and was first used in the story "The Health Nut", published on August 2, 1964.

Fethry has a rather unorthodox way of viewing and reacting to the world around him, as does his backwoods brother, Abner Duck (from WDC&S #267). In 1982, the Brazilian Disney market created a young nephew for Fethry named Dugan Duck who tends to be quite a handful. Like Goofy (Super Goof) and Donald (Superduck), since the early 1970s Fethry has occasionally donned superhero garb and called himself the Red Bat (not related to the villain of the same name whom Mickey Mouse faced in his heroic guise as "Plastic Mickey"). Occasionally Gloria, Fethry's girlfriend (created by Gerson Luiz Borlotti Texeira), would team-up with the Red Bat as another costumed crime-fighter called the Purple Butterfly (Borboleta Púrpura). Even Fethry's nephew, Dugan, has donned a costume and called himself Red Bat Junior. Fethry often appears in Uncle Scrooge and Donald Duck tales. In his earliest adventures he supposedly lived in another state (possibly New York or California, and had to visit via airplane or train. However, since 1964 he has resided in an old house definitely in Duckburg. He is also closely associated with the hillbilly Hard Haid Moe who dislikes Fethry very much (though Fethry does not seem to understand this), and with Donald's pet cat, Tabby.

=== Goldie O'Gilt ===
Goldie O'Gilt, a.k.a. Glittering Goldie, is Scrooge's secret sweetheart. Originally created by Carl Barks as a character in the story Back to the Klondike (Uncle Scrooge #2, March 1953), Goldie's origins are as a music hall singer in Dawson City. In a flashback sequence, Scrooge catches Goldie in an attempt to rob him of his recent gold poke, and she is forced to repay the debt by helping him work at his claim at White Agony Creek. Some 50 years later, they meet again and it is revealed that Goldie is now poor and living alone at Scrooge's former claim in Yukon.

Barks only used the character once, but Goldie and her relationship with Scrooge was later picked up and expanded by other creators. One of these was Don Rosa who used her in several stories, including The Life and Times of Scrooge McDuck and Last Sled to Dawson, where it is implied that Scrooge and Goldie fell in love with each other, but never revealed their feelings of affection to the other one, and eventually drifted apart as Scrooge traveled across the world and became a trillionaire, while Goldie remained in Dawson.

Carl Barks drew inspiration for Glittering Goldie's character from Kathleen Rockwell ("Klondike Kate" Rockwell).

Goldie is the owner of a wild bear called Blackjack trained by her to attack "prowlers", word used by Goldie herself in "Back to the Klondike".

Goldie is eventually used in Italian or Danish comic stories, but some of those ones show situations that may conflict with others previously showed in "Back to the Klondike". Some examples are her comic appearances in "Arriva Paperetta Yè-Yè" by Romano Scarpa, where she appears as a resident in a nursing home and as a grandmother of Dickie Duck, a girl who has recently completed her secondary education, and in a Danish story called "The Old Lady", where Donald ignores who is Scrooge's former love of Klondike when his uncle asks him to pick Goldie up at the train station, since she is coming for a visit. But Donald and his nephews knew Goldie personally in "Back to the Klondike". Curiously, Goldie appears taller than Scrooge in another Danish story, "After The Ball".

Goldie appears in the original DuckTales animated series, where her appearance is largely based on her comics origins. She has also been reimagined for the DuckTales reboot as a thieving adventurer that Scrooge has fought against and partnered with time and time again since they first met in Dawson. She also develops a brief mentorship with Louie Duck and reconciles with Scrooge by the end of the series.

=== Gloria ===
Gloria is the girlfriend of Fethry Duck, created by Brazilian comic artists in the early 1970s, when Fethry was starting to get very popular in Brazil. In her first story, "Paz, Amor E Glória" (Zé Carioca #1099, Dec 1972), she was a hippie girl. But her look and behavior were radically revamped in later stories and her hippie side was quite softened. She still looks like a hippie, but she acts more like an eccentric and a bit neurotic urban girl. For example, she appears using a vintage hair dryer, wearing high heels or practicing jogging in some stories.

Along with her boyfriend Fethry, Gloria was used in various Brazilian parodies of famous stories, especially during the 1980s. In the early 1980s she gained an alter ego called Purple Butterfly, as shown in "Nasce Uma Heroína... Borboleta Púrpura". Gloria's alter ego and Fethry's one, Red Bat, were shown working as a superhero duo in some stories, despite their mutual rivalry, and she proved to be a competent ally. Besides, Gloria was shown as a close friend of Daisy Duck in some stories, and in 1993 a Brazilian comic subseries called O Clube da Aventura showed Daisy, Minnie Mouse, Clarabelle Cow, Clara Cluck and Gloria as a group of adventurers.

Although Gloria may be considered as Fethry's greatest love, she was not his first one, since he was in love with another girl called Rita Gansa before knowing Gloria, but then Fethry decided to dump Rita for no apparent reason. Gloria and Rita met each other in the story "Quando A Glória I-Rita". Gloria, in turn, first fell in love with Fethry's alter ego, Red Bat, before becoming Fethry's girlfriend indeed, as shown in "Morcego Vermelho Conquista A Glória". Fethry has eventually appeared showing romantic interest in other girls, while Gloria has not had a full appearance in comics for many years. Nevertheless, she can be seen in a painting adorning a wall in Fethry's house in a Danish story called "Surprise, Surprise!" from 2014.

Gloria's mother is an Italian descendant called Pascoalina, who is the owner of a pizzeria in Duckburg, as shown in the Brazilian story "Genro À Bolonhesa". Mamma (Italian word for mommy) Pascoalina is portrayed as a sturdy woman with strong personality who does not approve her dear daughter's boyfriend, Fethry.

=== Granny De Spell ===
Granny De Spell, whose real name may be Caraldina De Spell, is the greatest witch in the world. She is the grandmother of Magica De Spell, and taught Magica sorcery when she was a child. By the 1960s, however, she had retired to a lonely and cobwebby old castle, where she spent most of her time sitting in a rocking chair, knitting. But her mind (and curses) are still sharp as flints, and she casts a usually-disapproving eye at her granddaughter's frequent attempts to get Scrooge McDuck's Dime, though she can also be persuaded to help her descendant once in a while. She and Magica love each other dearly, but Granny tends to get on Magica's nerves in her attempt to fix her up with clumsy magician Rosolio, for whom Magica really could not care less.

The character was created by George Davie and Jim Fletcher, and her first appearance was in the May 1966 comic story "A Lesson from Granny". Starting with the 1995 story "Magica De Spell and the Great Rock of Power-Plus", Giorgio Cavazzano introduced a redesigned, more active Granny De Spell, now sporting long blond hair, who has made several subsequent appearances.

Granny De Spell's first name has not been used in English publication. However, her Italian name gives it as Caraldina, which considering the fact that the character is, in-universe, Italian, is a perfectly plausible suggestion. Further strengthening it is the fact that she bears similar first names in the German (Karoline) and French (Caroline) versions.

Granny De Spell's precise age is also unknown, but she states in her debut that she was already the queen of sorcery before Madam Mim was even born, making her at least over 1500 years old.

=== Gotrocks ===
Gotrocks is a not very well-known rival of Scrooge McDuck. He was used for the first time in the May 1966 story "The Luck of Pali" by Bob Gregory and Tony Strobl, where he and Scrooge both take a part in a museum contest to know who has the most unusual valuable object. Gotrocks is an unpleasant old man with black and thick eyebrows, whose eyes are quite often narrowed, as suggesting that he owns a foxy personality. He has long and white hair on the right and left sides of his head and is always holding a crutch. Gotrocks was also used by the prolific Brazilian comic writer Ivan Saidenberg in four comic stories.

Another very different character also called Gotrocks appears in "The Goat With the Long Silky Hair" as a rival of Scrooge too.

=== Brigitta MacBridge ===
Brigitta MacBridge, is a supporting character created in Italy by Romano Scarpa, first appearing in "The Last Balaboo" (Topolino #243, July 1960). While she first appeared in 1960, her relationship with Scrooge McDuck is said to have started in 1930. The relationship did not start well. Scrooge, who at the time had already been isolated from his family, when hearing of her feelings about him reacted quite cynically. He bought her an expensive fur coat and in exchange asked her to never bother him again. This did not work. Brigitta truly loves Scrooge, and for decades she has tried every method to get him to return her love. This includes stalking him, which greatly infuriates Scrooge. To impress him she has established her own business and at times acts as his rival. She has proven to be cunning and skilful and seems to have a very strong will. Sometimes she has Jubal Pomp helping her. Dickie Duck (Goldie's Granddaughter) occasionally appears as her employee.

Right from the beginning, Scarpa and his successors have left enough hints that Scrooge is interested in her, but does not enjoy her obsession with him. Although he pretends to be emotionless — a typical character trait — he is not. When she gets in trouble, he is there to help her, and he has at times protected her from danger. Whenever another man expresses an interest in her, Scrooge seems not to be above jealousy. In the story "The Next Best Thing" by writer Lars Jensen and artist José Maria Manrique, Scrooge manipulates his rival Flintheart Glomgold into dating her, so he can feel free at last, but then he discovers Flintheart is heartlessly using her and rescues her. Though Scrooge has had chances to end their strange relationship, when she is truly frustrated with his behavior, he has instead chosen to pass them by and even apologizes to her at times.

On another note, Brigitta acts as Scrooge's personal nurse whenever he is sick and has nursed him back to health on many occasions. She is among Scrooge's most trusted allies and she volunteers to help whenever he asks for it. Scrooge's relatives are quite friendly with Brigitta and seem to have accepted her as an unofficial member of the family; she is even present in family meetings. Brigitta has also helped them against the Beagle Boys and Magica De Spell at times. John D. Rockerduck is said to find his rival's relationship amusing and is himself friendly with Brigitta, including John already pretended to be in love with her to make Scrooge jealous. And it really worked for Brigitta, but then Scrooge discovered her pact with John, who was interested in keeping Scrooge busy in a possible marriage with Brigitta. These events were shown in the story "Zio Paperone e l'amore a seconda vista" ("Uncle Scrooge and Love at Second Sight").

In the story Brother From Another Earth! (1995), written by Rudy Salvagnini and drawn by Giorgio Cavazzano, a parallel-universe Scrooge is bankrupt and married to Brigitta, whose shopaholic ways are contributing to his money problems. When the parallel-universe Scrooge fools the Earth A Scrooge into trading places, the Earth A Scrooge works to set things right by retiring his debts and seeking money-making opportunities. He also put Brigitta on a strict budget and says she should do her own cooking, as she was once a restaurateur. After Scrooge solves the money problems of his parallel-universe counterpart, he returns to his own world but realizes he may be missing out on marriage, so he starts a relationship with the Brigitta from his world.

Despite the fact that Brigitta MacBridge and Glittering Goldie love the same man, Scrooge McDuck, these two quite different ladies have never been in conflict because of his affection in the rare comic stories where they both appear. But in the story "The Miner's Granddaughter" by Romano Scarpa, Brigitta feels really sad when she sees Scrooge and Glittering together for a brief moment, but then Glittering comforts her and says that she assumes Brigitta loves Scrooge's stingness more than himself and Brigitta thanks for Glittering's "kind" words and calls her "my friend". There are only other six Italian stories — "Zio Paperone Pigmalione" ("Uncle Scrooge Benefactor") by writer Caterina Mognato and artist Sandro Dossi, "Zio Paperone e Le Grandi Conquiste" ("Uncle Scrooge and The Big Achievement") by writer Gianfranco Cordara and artist Andrea Ferraris, "Paperina di Rivondosa" ("Daisy of Rivondosa") by Silvia Ziche, "San Valentino a Paperopoli — Doretta vs Brigitta?" ("Valentine's Day in Duckburg — Goldie vs Brigitta?") by writer Giorgio Fontana and artist Marco Mazzarello, "Zio Paperone e il nuovo canto di Natale" ("Uncle Scrooge and the new Christmas Carol") by writer Marco Bosco and artist Silvia Ziche and "Piccole grandi papere" ("Small big ducks") by writer Marco Bosco and artist Silvia Ziche — where they both appear, but they are not shown talking to each other in the first three stories, including they do not even meet face to face in any panel of the stories "Zio Paperone Pigmalione" and "Zio Paperone e Le Grandi Conquiste".

In German and Dutch, she is named Gitta (sometimes Brigitta) Gans (Gans = Goose). In newer Dutch comics her name is changed to Brigitta MacBridge.

=== John D. Rockerduck ===
John D. Rockerduck is a wealthy oil magnate, and one of Scrooge McDuck's main business rivals. Rockerduck was created by Carl Barks, who used him in one story: "Boat Buster", first published in Walt Disney's Comics and Stories #255 (Dec 1961).

=== Magica De Spell ===
Magica De Spell is an evil sorceress who is always trying to steal Scrooge's Number One Dime in order to make an amulet that will give her the Midas Touch. The character was created by Carl Barks in the December 1961 story "The Midas Touch".

=== Miss Quackfaster ===
Emily Quackfaster or Florence Quackfaster is the secretary of Scrooge McDuck. She was originally hired by Scrooge's sisters Hortense McDuck and Matilda McDuck. At first Scrooge did not like the idea of having someone on his payroll but he got used to her very quickly. In fact, some stories have revealed that Scrooge has come to depend on Miss Quackfaster. Even though Scrooge is a shrewd businessman and can easily smell profit, running basic organizational jobs in his own office is beyond his capability.

Miss Quackfaster first appeared in Uncle Scrooge #36 (Dec 1961) in the story The Midas Touch (the same story that introduced Magica De Spell), and her last name Quackfaster was first used in Uncle Scrooge #39 (Sept 1962) in A Spicy Tale. Both stories were created by Carl Barks. Miss Quackfaster is almost always referred to by her surname. In one story by Don Rosa, The Empire-Builder from Calisota (1994), her first name was said to be Emily. However, in Geoffrey Blum's Uncle Scrooge comic World Wide Witch (2001, published in the US in Uncle Scrooge #320), her first name is given as Florence instead (her full name is seen on the door to her office). Later stories by other authors have occasionally used the name Emily again. She was also known as Miss Typefast in some stories and on the 1987 show DuckTales she was called Mrs. Featherby. In the 2017 DuckTales series she is once again known by the name of Emily Quackfaster and is the somewhat unhinged keeper of Scrooge's private archives.

=== Hustler Duck ===
Hustler Duck is an obscure character created by Dick Kinney and Al Hubbard that works as a marketing man. He first appeared in "The Good Earth", first published in Almanacco Topolino #94 (Oct 1964). The American cartoonists who most frequently used this character were Jim Fletcher and Vivie Risto, although Hubbard is credited for co-creating him. Hustler is funnily annoying and he wears big round glasses, like John Rockerduck. He is always ready to sell his services in different professional areas to Uncle Scrooge McDuck in most of his oldest stories. After almost ten years without being used in comic stories, Hustler appeared in two Brazilian ones firstly published in 1975. His last appearance was in a Brazilian story from 1991.

In the comic story "A Star is Born", Hustler calls an aunt of him, but the name of this aunt is not revealed.

=== Katie Mallard ===
Katie "Hashknife Kate" Mallard is an old friend of Scrooge who first appeared in "Mystery of the Ghost Town Railroad" by Carl Barks (Uncle Scrooge #56, March 1965). Katie is portrayed as a kind and brave woman. She uses some humor in the story too. For example, when everybody around her is tense because of mysterious thefts, she offers pancakes with a smile on her face saying that at least her pancakes cannot be stolen. According to the story, Scrooge and Katie meet each other in the city of Goldopolis after sixty two years. Katie's granddaughter, the cowgirl Ducky Bird, appears in the beginning of this one, meeting Donald, his nephews and Scrooge by chance. Scrooge is desperate when he meets Ducky, since he thinks it will be impossible to find a certificate for one thousand shares in the Goldopolis and Boom City Railroad that he had intentionally hidden in the now desolate city of Goldopolis to avoid that they were stolen by the McViper Clan. He had previously discovered that those shares suddenly became highly valuable. Then he at last discovers that Ducky is the granddaughter of his old friend "Hashnife Kate", who tells him about how dangerous is to stay in the city lately.

On their next appearance in the story, Katie and Ducky think Scrooge and his nephews are in trouble with robbers, after they heard some shooting coming from the old hotel where Scrooge decided to spend the night. Soon Katie and Ducky discover that Donald and the triplets are dealing with ghosts inside the hotel.

Katie Mallard also has a cameo appearance in the second-to-last episode of "The Life and Times of Scrooge McDuck" by Don Rosa, where she is younger.

=== Dickie Duck ===
Dickie Duck (Italian: Paperetta Yè-Yè) was created by Romano Scarpa. She first appeared in "Arriva Paperetta Yè-Yè" ("The Miner's Granddaughter", published in Topolino #577 (Dec 1966). She was introduced as Goldie O'Gilt's granddaughter. In the story "Paperetta e la leggenda del luna park" by Romano Scarpa she calls Huey, Dewey, and Louie cuginetti (small/young cousins) (in the third panel of the first page) and then cugini (cousins) (in the fourth panel of the second page), showing she has developed a close relationship with the McDuck/Duck family. Dickie does not have an official family name in Italy, being "Yè-Yè" a reference to Yé-yé, a style of pop music of the early 1960s, which she uses with her original name, "Paperetta", as if to show her love for pop music. She has become popular in Italy, Denmark, Brazil and some other countries, while she is almost unknown in the USA and others. Dickie clearly seems to be older than Huey, Dewey, and Louie. According to Scarpa, she completed her secondary education at a boarding school (Goldie says to Scrooge in the original Italian, "Ehm, come sai, ho una nipotina che è cresciuta in collegio! Ora ne esce...", which can be loosely translated as "Er, you know, I have a granddaughter who has grown in a boarding school! Now she's leaving..."), so she is possibly around 18 years old. In recent comics, she is often depicted as attending a university.

Goldie and Dickie's connection as grandmother and granddaughter is loose, but has been referenced in multiple stories since then. The first one was in the Italian story "Arriva Paperetta Yè-Yè" (published in the US as "The Miner's Granddaughter" in IDW's Uncle Scrooge #18), which introduced Dickie in this particular universe. In this story, Goldie drops Dickie off because she cannot take care of her anymore, so she asks Scrooge McDuck to do it for her. Dickie usually lives in her own house or a college dorm with a roommate.

Sometimes Dickie has worked as a reporter for Brigitta McBridge or for Scrooge's little known brother Gideon McDuck.

In Brazil, her name is Pata Lee, (a reference to the singer Rita Lee) she appeared in her own series with her teen friends the short owl Netunia, the tall crane Olimpia, the handsome pelican Parceiro, and Foliao, which is actually the name given to the old cartoon character Aracuan Bird, in a series of stories titled Os Adolescentes (translated loosely from Portuguese to The Teenagers) as a bonus story in Ze Carioca (a comic book starring José Carioca). Netunia, Olimpia and Parceiro were specially created to be part of Dickie's gang by Brazilian Disney Studios, which belongs to Grupo Abril. That was the first (and probably only) time that a teen gang was introduced in the "Duckverse" (a nickname commonly used to refer to the Disney Ducks Universe). Dickie and her four close friends possibly are studying journalism at some university of Duckburg, because of her clear connection to the reporter career, which was shown in various comic stories. Donald and his nephews never appeared in those stories with Dickie's teen gang.

Dickie Duck's first American appearance was in the Gemstone run of Donald Duck Adventures, in the story "Return to TNT", in a cameo.

Just like Moby Duck, Dickie is one of the few secondary characters who was cast as a small figurine in two different Italian collections by De Agostini.

=== 0.0. Duck and Mata Harrier ===
0.0. Duck and Mata Harrier are a secret-agent duo. They were created by Dick Kinney and Al Hubbard for the Disney Studio Program, a unit that produced Disney comics for foreign publication. Their first story was "The Case of the Purloined Pearls" published in 1966. 0.0. Duck's name is a play on "007" (a.k.a. "James Bond") while Mata Harrier's one is an obvious play on "Mata Hari". They appeared for the first time in the story "The Case of the Purloined Pearls", where they fought against agents of the evil organization "BLONK". Then the agents of this organization became the traditional rivals of 0.0. Duck and Mata Harrier in their subsequent stories, most of them created by Brazilian cartoonists. 0.0. Duck owns a small dog ironically called Wolf. The latest comic appearance of 0.0. Duck, Mata Harrier, Wolf and agents of BLONK was in the 20th adventure of the comic subseries Tamers of Nonhuman Threats, called "Things that Go Blonk". Even 0.0. & Mata's subchief, created by Brazilian comic artists in 1975, appears in this one.

=== Belle Duck ===
Belle Duck is a plus-sized, tall and elegant duck lady. She appeared for the first time in "Belle Corners the Coin Collection" with drawings by the cartoonist Al Hubbard, first published in Topolino #591 (March 1967). In this story, Scrooge meets Belle again 40 years after their last meeting. He tells to his grandnephews Huey, Dewey, and Louie before her arrival at his house that she was the most charming girl of her town, being daughter of a tycoon who lived in a mansion. But later Belle reveals that now a riverboat called The Gilded Lily is everything that she can own, since she spent all her inheritance money. Scrooge cannot hide his surprise at seeing his old crush's look after all those years when they finally meet each other in the story. Tony Strobl was the American cartoonist who most frequently drew this character, despite Hubbard was the cartoonist who first drew her. Belle is an independent, self-assured, generous and warm-hearted woman, and Huey, Dewey, and Louie Duck adore her. She also has a joyful personality and she loves to give parties on her riverboat by using Scrooge's money. Borrowing money from Scrooge is generally the first thing that Belle thinks of when she intends to repair The Gilded Lily or to buy a new piece of machinery for it. She often shows a daring behavior towards Scrooge, like in "The Return of Belle Duck" by Strobl, where Scrooge asks her about what they will talk about and she answers, "About your money... and how I'm going to spend it!".

In "Go West, Young Duck" by Dick Kinney and Tony Strobl, Belle tells the story of a European ancestor of her called Christina Duck who tried to find America in 1492.

After many years without a comic appearance, the last one had been in a Brazilian story from 1982, Belle appeared again in "Riverboat Rovers" by Lars Jensen and José Ramon Bernardo, first published in 2007. Thus far, Belle Duck's latest appearance was in a Danish story written by Lars Jensen and drawn by Andrea Ferraris first published in 2015.

=== Grand Mogul ===
The Grand Mogul is an anthropomorphic tall duck with a big chest who appears in stories of the Junior Woodchucks. He first appeared in "Rescue of the Grand Mogul" by Vic Lockman and Tony Strobl (Huey Dewie and Louie Junior Woodchucks #2, Aug 1967). In various comic stories, the Grand Mogul was shown with a big belly instead of a big chest. He is often portrayed as a self-confident, demanding and rigid leader, but not rarely he has clumsy attitudes. The name Grand Mogul is actually rarely mentioned in the Junior Woodchucks comic stories, since their leader's official name traditionally changes from one story to another (e.g. Great J.A.W.B.O.N.E., Great C.O.O.L.H.E.A.D., Great I.R.O.N.H.E.A.R.T., Great T.O.P. B.R.A.S.S. — these abbreviations are always spelled out in a text box when they are first mentioned, but their expansions are usually quite contrived), but it was stipulated as the generic one when someone wants to refer in English language to the leader of this group of scouting boys created by Carl Barks. His real name never was revealed. Before the story "Whale of a Good Deed", firstly published in Huey, Dewey, and Louie/Junior Woodchucks #7, the Junior Woodchucks' leader was generally shown as some Carl Barks's dognose (a human face with dog snout). But even in later stories with the Junior Woodchucks a character with dognose look eventually appears as their leader. The comic story "Rescue of the Grand Mogul" possibly was the first one where the name Grand Mogul was used to refer to the leader of the Junior Woodchucks, but it was written by Vic Lockman, not by Barks, and its title refers to the rescue of a dognose leader.

Since 1992 the cartoonist Daan Jippes, a fan and follower of Carl Barks, has used the Grand Mogul in many old comic stories written by Barks. He has redrawn those ones.

A new Grand Mogul was introduced in Italy in the 1990s, whose nickname is Mogul Bertie. His real name is said to be Bertie McGoose. He is a goose guy with blonde hair, being quite more easy-going than the original Mogul. And his chest is not as big as the Grand Mogul's one. He has a crush on the leader of the Italian version of the Chickadees, Clarissa (original Italian name), a human-like girl. Mogul Bertie became a major character in the Italian comic book series Giovani Marmotte (Italian name for the Junior Woodchucks). But other characters also became popular among Italian comic readers with this comic book series, especially Alvin, a scared chicken kid, and Lardello (original Italian name), a gluttonous pig kid. Alvin is actually a revamped version of an old character from foreign market stories, who has only one story published in America, "The Spirit of Chief Firebird", where he is called Willie.

=== Roberta ===
Roberta is an anthropomorphic female duck who appeared for the first time in "Uncle Scrooge and the Witches in Action" ("Zio Paperone e le streghe in azione") from Topolino #812 (June 1971), written by Rodolfo Cimino and drawn by Giorgio Cavazzano. She is a witch friend of Magica De Spell and has been used in various Italian stories, becoming a relatively popular character. In her first comic appearance, Roberta is described as a technological witch, but she does not hesitate to use ancient wizardry knowledge to help Magica to steal Scrooge's Number One Dime. Despite being a duck, Roberta possesses a very different beak comparing to the usual ones in this particular universe. Her beak is longer and pointier. Roberta originally has big, frizzy blonde hair and blue eyes.

After having three comic book appearances during the 1970s, Roberta started being used again during the 1990s in comic stories mostly written by her co-creator Rodolfo Cimino. Her last comic book appearance thus far was in a story from 2008, where she appears with her original look.

=== Reginella ===
Reginella is an anthropomorphic female duck created in Italian Disney comics by writer Rodolfo Cimino and artist Giorgio Cavazzano, first appearing in "The Kingdom Under the Sea" ("Paperino e l'avventura sottomarina"), from Topolino #873 (Aug 1972). She is a queen who governs an undersea kingdom inhabited by duck-like aliens forced to live in our planet after losing their spaceship in a disaster. She became one of Donald Duck's greatest loves. In her first comic appearance, she knows Donald after he is captured by one of her subjects while he was practicing the underwater fishing to fulfill her own order, since she is irresistibly attracted by his look and intends to make him her king. However, she is advised by her counselor to let him go, after Donald commits an act of cowardice. Donald's romance with Reginella ended up becoming a trilogy, whose first two "chapters" were respectively published in 1972 and 1974. The last one was published only in 1987. After the end of this trilogy, Reginella appeared in two comic stories published during the 1990s. She also had a cameo appearance in a commemorative story to celebrate the 60th anniversary of the Italian comic book series Topolino. She also appears in a long comic story by Silvia Ziche.

=== O.K. Quack ===
O.K. Quack is an alien duck who appears in some Italian comics created by Carlo Chendi and drawn by Giorgio Cavazzano.

His first appearance was in "Topolino" #1353 (Nov 1981) in the story "Paperino e il turista spaziale" (published in the US as "The Tourist at the End of the Universe" in IDW's Uncle Scrooge #30). He is an alien who came from space, and more precisely from the planet Duck, with his spaceship shaped as a coin and that can be shrunk to the size of a dime and reads O.K. Quack's fingerprints as a means of activating its size mechanism. He also appeared in some other stories such as "Zio Paperone e il satellite bomba" (published in the US as "Scare of the Sky Satellite!" in IDW's Uncle Scrooge #33) from "Topolino" #1354, "E quando Paperino prende una decisione..." ("And when Donald takes a decision...") from "Topolino" #1373; "Zio Paperone e la moneta disco volante" ("Uncle Scrooge and the flying saucer coin"); "Zio Paperone e la piramide capovolta" ("Uncle Scrooge and the upside-down pyramid").

In all of these stories O.K. Quack is looking for his spaceship that has been lost and is circulating as a dime somewhere in Duckburg. O.K. Quack soon reveals his strange abilities such as being able to communicate mentally with seemingly inanimate objects (usually convincing locks to "unlock themselves", but he particularly likes talking to flowers) and telekinesis (moving things with the power of his mind, even buildings as big as Scrooge's money bin). He does not understand the concept or use of money (in this way he seems to have been inspired by Bill Walsh and Floyd Gottfredson's Eega Beewa). Franco Fossati once defined him as "...a perfect character who with his innocence criticizes the absurdity of our society. Going on with time he will adequate to our times and to our every-day way of living and we'll forget that he came from space." Uncle Scrooge, Donald Duck and the Nephews know that O.K. Quack is a space alien and are actively trying to help him find his ship. They first met him in the money bin where he entered talking to Scrooge's locks and was looking at Scrooge's coins thinking that they were all spaceships. Thus he does not require any cover story and can freely act in his strange ways (at least in front of them). He sometimes lives in the Money Bin, and sometimes in a rented room in a small hotel in Duckburg where he met Humphrey Gokart, a sorry private detective whose services O.K. has contracted to also help locate his spaceship.

As for his initials "O.K." there has been no real explanation and it is assumed that they basically mean the same as the American expression meaning "alright!"

Other friendly aliens like O.K. Quack have appeared in Italian stories and have also become friends of members of the Duck Family, such as Little Gum, who is able to make different shapes with chewing gums, and Etci, who came from a planet where everybody likes to invent facts and developed allergy to lies. His name is the Italian onomatopoeia for a sneeze.

=== Humphrey Gokart ===
Humphrey Gokart (original Italian name: Umperio Bogarto) is a private detective. He was created by Italian cartoonists Carlo Chendi and Giorgio Cavazzano in 1982 to be used as a supporting character in two stories with O.K. Quack. Ironically, Gokart became more popular than O.K. He is named after the actor Humphrey Bogart. Gokart's office is straight from a typical 1920s-era American detective novel. He is running severely late on payment of his rent. Gokart wears a trench coat, a fedora and gum-soled shoes.

As a detective, Gokart is rather clumsy and incompetent. Despite this, Scrooge McDuck often relies on his services, because he is by far the cheapest detective in Duckburg. Gokart started his career as a hotel detective, with the job of looking for clients who left without paying. After moving on to bigger cases, Gokart has started cooperating with Fethry Duck.

=== Pandy Pap ===
Pandy Pap is an Italian Disney character who appeared in three comic stories drawn by the cartoonist Giorgio Cavazzano during the 1990s; her first story was "Zio Paperone e la fabbrica d'aria" (Topolino #1783, Jan 1990). She is a radical ecologist who became friends with Huey, Dewey, and Louie and the Junior Woodchucks. Pandy has straight blonde hair and wears hot pink short overalls.

=== Howard Rockerduck ===
Howard Rockerduck, invented by Don Rosa, is an American businessman and the father of Scrooge's rival John D. Rockerduck. He first appeared in "The Raider of the Copper Hill", published in Anders And & Co. #1993-02 (Jan 1993). Howard Rockerduck, implied to be much older than Scrooge, was already a millionaire by the time Scrooge was earning his fortune. Unlike his son, who is not above resorting to cheating and even criminal behavior to compete with Scrooge, Howard Rockerduck is an honest and honorable businessman.

Howard Rockerduck has made only two major appearances in the comics. His first appearance was when Scrooge was earning his fortune in the American Old West. Howard, who was traveling with his wife and infant son John on a stagecoach to Butte, Montana, spotted Scrooge digging for gold beside the road. Impressed with Scrooge's efforts, Howard stayed to help Scrooge out while his wife and son continued to Butte without him.

Howard Rockerduck later appeared in Scrooge's old hometown Glasgow in Scotland, when Magica De Spell used time travel to steal Scrooge's Number One Dime while he was still a small boy. In this timeline, Howard was only a background character and did not even meet Scrooge. He was traveling on a holiday in Europe, flaunting his riches and trying to flirt with the local ladies, who were not very receptive to this behavior. After an encounter with Magica, who Howard first thought was a normal Scottish lady, but who later even caused Howard's stagecoach to crash in her mad pursuit of Scrooge's famous dime, Howard decided he had had enough of the temper of the Scottish ladies and bought a ticket on a ship back to the United States.

=== Princess Oona ===
Princess Oona is a character created by Stefan Printz-Påhlson and his wife Unn Printz-Påhlson in the story "Princess Oona" (Anders And & Co. #1995-47, Nov 1995). During a trip to the Stone Age in Gyro Gearloose's time machine Gyro and Donald Duck first meet the incredibly strong cave-duck Oona. On the journey back to the future she stows away in the time machine, and has remained in Duckburg ever since.

All of the early Princess Oona stories—and a significant percentage of modern ones—were illustrated by the Chilean artist Victor Arriagades Rios, better known by his artist name Vicar.

After having written the first couple of stories about Princess Oona, Stefan Printz-Påhlson asked the rest of the Egmont crew to do stories with the super cave girl. So far about 25 have been created, teaming Princess Oona with such well-known Disney characters as Scrooge McDuck, Daisy Duck, Gladstone Gander, the Beagle Boys and Huey, Dewey, and Louie. Oona claims to be attracted to Donald and she is always trying to get his attention, but in the story "Love and War" by Lars Jensen and Vicar she falls for Gladstone.

The adventures of Princess Oona have appeared in Disney publications in many countries including Norway, Denmark, Sweden, Estonia, Finland, Germany, France, Italy, the Netherlands, Hungary, Brazil, Iceland and Russia. She has not appeared in any animation, though she is similar to the DuckTales character Bubba the Caveduck.

=== Evronians ===
The Evronians are a race of extraterrestrial ducks who appear in PKNA comics, first created in 1996. They are antagonists of Donald's superhero alter ego the "Duck Avenger" (Italian: Paperinik). Individual Evronian characters are listed in the main article.

=== Boomer Buff ===
Boomer Buff (original italian name: Bum Bum Ghigno) is a character created by Corrado Mastantuono in 1997. Boomer Buff is a rotund man who dresses in overalls and a red chequered shirt. He also has protruding front teeth, similar to Goofy, and thick black eyebrows.

Boomer Buff is a general layabout with no permanent profession. He is frequently seen in various short-timed jobs, but his laziness and clumsiness prevent him from holding them for long. In his first appearance he was an antagonist to Donald Duck and Gyro Gearloose, but has since become their friend.

=== Velma Vanderduck ===
Velma Vanderduck is a rich Dutch woman who competes with Scrooge. Her first appearance was in "Two-Bit Tycoons", in Anders And & Co. #1999-38 (Sept 1999). She is a redhead with green eyes. Velma has a personal secretary, Jackson Jackdaw, an anthropomorphic jackdaw. Thus far, Velma has already appeared in six stories written by Lars Jensen. The last one was published in 2016.

=== Fantomallard ===
Fantomallard (Italian: Fantomius), occasionally translated as Phantom Duck, was a notorious masked gentleman thief during the 1920s. Fantomallard was the alter ego of Lord John Lamont Quackett, an aristocratic playboy who liked to play jibes at other aristocrats. By donning a special suit and a bright blue mask covering his entire face, Lord Quackett turned into Fantomallard, a gentleman thief who robbed richer aristocrats of money or other valuables he thought they had got by unjust means, and then dealt out his loot to help the poor.

Decades later, Donald Duck accidentally discovered Lord Quackett's secret hideout and decided to become the Duck Avenger (Italian: Paperinik). In the first stories, the Duck Avenger was a vindicator who continued his predecessor's work, but later stories turned him to more of a superhero character, fighting crime for altruistic instead of egoistic reasons.

Some stories take place in Fantomallard's time in the 1920s, featuring the original Fantomallard instead of the modern Duck Avenger. These stories are easily identifiable by using less saturated colours, evoking the feel of classic 1920s-era films.

=== Dolly Paprika ===
Dolly Paprika was Fantomallard's female partner-in-crime during the 1920s. Dolly Paprika was the alter ego of Dolly Duck (Italian: Dolly Papera), Lord Quackett's girlfriend. When masked, Dolly Paprika wore a red outfit masking her entire body. She supported her boyfriend on his nearly every adventure and often took advantage of her seemingly harmless appearance to fool her adversaries.

== Other bird characters ==
=== Clara Cluck ===
Clara Cluck debuted in the 1934 Mickey Mouse cartoon Orphan's Benefit. She is an operatic chicken who is a good friend of Mickey Mouse.

It is possible that Clara Cluck played the title role in The Wise Little Hen (June 9, 1934), as both characters were voiced by the same person, Florence Gill, and there is more than just a passing physical resemblance. However, by the time she made her big debut in the original version of Orphan's Benefit, she had changed into an oversized operatic diva; a role that she would continue in until the end. Clara's singing is meant to be a caricature of the Bel Canto style of Opera singing popular at the time of her appearance. Some of her arias are clearly modeled on those of Tosca. Her last major appearance was as one of the musicians in Symphony Hour. Curiously, although she is seen in the rehearsal scenes at the beginning, she is not seen in the performance scenes at the end.

Despite Clara's absence from most other Disney media, Clara has remained a major supporting character in the Disney Comic universe. She is usually seen with the rest of the "classic" Disney cast. In most adaptations, she is seen speaking properly rather than her usual clucks from her appearance in Disney cartoons. She is usually portrayed as one of Daisy's best friends, not to say her best friend, in American, Italian, Danish, Dutch and Brazilian comic stories.

Clara Cluck has appeared in the Disney parks as a meetable character. She has also been seen in shows and parades.

=== José Carioca ===
José Carioca is a green, Brazilian parrot who first appears in the Disney film Saludos Amigos (1942) alongside Donald Duck. He returned in the 1944 film The Three Caballeros along with Donald and a Mexican rooster named Panchito Pistoles. José is from Rio de Janeiro, Brazil (thus the name "Carioca", which is a term used for a person born in Rio de Janeiro).

=== Panchito Pistoles ===
Panchito Pistoles is a red, Mexican rooster who was created as the third titular caballero (along with Donald Duck and José Carioca) for the 1944 film The Three Caballeros. Later he appeared in several Disney comics, including a year-long run in the Silly Symphony Sunday comic strip (1944-1945), as well as Don Rosa's comic book stories The Three Caballeros Ride Again (2000) and The Magnificent Seven (Minus 4) Caballeros (2005).

=== Gyro Gearloose ===
Gyro Gearloose is a tall, anthropomorphic chicken who is a scientist and inventor. He first appeared in the Carl Barks comic "Gladstone's Terrible Secret" (Walt Disney's Comics and Stories #140, May 1952), and was the regular lead character in 4-page backup stories in Barks' issues of Uncle Scrooge, starting with issue #13 (March 1956) and continuing through #41 (March 1963).

=== Mad Ducktor ===
The Mad Ducktor is a tall, anthropomorphic chicken similar to Gyro Gearloose. He is a mad scientist who is the arch-enemy of Gyro Gearloose. The Mad Ducktor is a product of the evil side of Gyro's mind, which manifested in a physical form. Thus he is familiar with how Gyro's mind works, which he uses to his advantage.

The Mad Ducktor looks similar to Gyro Gearloose, but has a slightly more obese build, and his face is often twisted into a maniacal expression. He sometimes uses his similar appearance to masquerade as Gyro Gearloose. He has no specific ultimate motive to his crimes, other than to create havoc and ruin Gyro's reputation.

The Mad Ducktor's most prominent weakness is his fondness for muffins. Whenever he finds muffins, he abandons his current plans to get to eat them as soon as possible. This has been used to trap and arrest him.

=== Rockhead Rooster ===
Rockhead Rooster is a character who first appeared in a 1959 Daisy's Diary story, "The Double Date" by Carl Barks. He later became a recurring minor character, making various other printed appearances in recent years. He is Clara Cluck's pen pal, and when he comes to Duckburg, Clara and Daisy decide to have a double date, Clara taking Rockhead and Daisy taking Donald. Donald and Rockhead get along so well that they do not pay enough attention to their girlfriends, as he agrees with Donald on everything.

=== Jubal Pomp ===
Jubal Pomp (Filo Sganga) is a fat, chicken-faced businessman created by Romano Scarpa in 1961. His main ambition is to become as rich as Scrooge McDuck but his attempts at gaining wealth tend to be disastrous. When he tries to compete with Scrooge, he markets eccentric products (firefly-powered mood lights, for instance) that meet with varied success at best. When he tries to convince Scrooge to become partners in some project, the result is Jubal being kicked out of Scrooge's office.

Jubal sometimes helps Brigitta MacBridge try to get back at Scrooge by setting up businesses to rival his. On these occasions Jubal is more successful.

He first appeared in "Zio Paperone e il ratto di Brigitta" (published in the US as "The Secret of Success" in Uncle Scrooge #338), Topolino #272 (February 12, 1961). He appears as an upstart businessman who happens to overhear Scrooge mentioning his "Secret of Prosperity". Convinced that the contents of the Secret would open his path to true wealth, he sought to blackmail Scrooge. He abducted Brigitta McBridge, Scrooge's stalker/love interest and asked the contents of the Secret as ransom. Scrooge was at first reluctant if he should rescue her or take the opportunity to be free of her obsessive pursuit. However he finally decided on retrieving his lady and managed to locate Jubal's hiding place and launch a successful rescue operation. He also took the opportunity to explain that his "Secret of Prosperity" were the virtues which led him to wealth, not some kind of shortcut.

Jubal is bright and creative but his money making schemes are at times both clumsy and impractical. On his own he is more of a nuisance than an actual threat. However Brigitta has decided that one way to impress Scrooge is prove her own worth as a businesswoman. Pulling her resources with Jubal, the duo have been able to launch a number of locally successful business operations in Duckburg. Providing true competition to Scrooge and often breaking his hold on a certain market. It helps that Brigitta appears to be equally resourceful to Scrooge in launching out new operations and surpasses him in the marketing and advertisement process. With her as a partner, Jubal enjoys much more success. There are a few stories that hint to him seeing Brigitta as more than a business partner and friend but they are not really romantically involved.

=== Emil Eagle ===
Emil Eagle first appeared in Uncle Scrooge #63 (May 1966) as a rival inventor for Gyro Gearloose, in the story "The Evil Inventor" by Vic Lockman. Later on, he was adopted into the Mickey Mouse universe as an enemy for Mickey Mouse and his friends, in particular Super Goof.

Emil has caused a lot of trouble for Mickey Mouse, Super Goof, Donald Duck, Scrooge McDuck, Gyro Gearloose, and other characters on various occasions. Sometimes he has teamed up with Black Pete, the Beagle Boys, Mad Madam Mim, or other bad guys in the Mickey Mouse universe or the Duck universe. There are two stories where John D. Rockerduck hires Emil to take advantage of his inventive genius. "Zio Paperone e la sfida robotica (Uncle Scrooge and the Robotic Challenge) and "Dog Eat Dog".

Emil is particularly popular among Brazilian comic readers. In addition, he appeared as a small figurine in two different Italian collections with Disney characters made by De Agostini.

Emil Eagle was a Boss in the videogame The Duckforce Rises in 2015.

=== Zantaf ===
Zantaf is an Italian character created by the comic writer Carlo Chendi and the cartoonist Luciano Bottaro. He debuted in the Italian story "Paperino missione Zantaf" (known in English as "Tycoonraker! or From Zantaf with Lumps!"), first published in Almanacco Topolino #142 (Oct 1968). In the story, Donald Duck is working for Scrooge McDuck's secret agency (called P.I.A. in Italian language).

Zantaf is a mad scientist who wants to conquer the world by using stolen fortunes from rich men like Scrooge McDuck, and for this purpose he uses his scientific genius to build robots programmed to help him. Like Dr. No (from a James Bond film), Zantaf owns his own secret island. Since 2004 Zantaf has also appeared in some Danish stories.

=== Garvey Gull ===
Garvey Gull is a young, anthropomorphic seagull who is a mischievous, homeless orphan friend of Huey, Dewey, and Louie. Donald does not think much of him. The character was created by writer Paul Halas and artist Daniel Branca, and debuted in the 2002 story "Junior Chuckwoods", first published in Eastern Europe. A big part of the stories where he has an important role were drawn by the Argentinian cartoonist Wanda Gattino, Branca's compatriot. Garvey's arch-enemy is Mr. Phelps, a rat-faced railway security guard who views Garvey as an outlaw and wants to drive him off the railway where he works.

In Europe, Garvey's (British) English name is Sonny Seagull. Garvey is his name in American comics.

=== Baron Thieving ===
Baron Thieving (Finnish name: Bär Lingonsylt) is an anthropomorphic pelican. He was designed and invented as the result of the Finnish Aku Ankka magazine's "design a villain" competition. He debuted in the story "The Baron Cordially Invites You", which was first printed in Aku Ankka #2016-48 (Nov 2016), and returned two years later in "The Return of the Baron", which appeared in Aku Ankka #2018-36 (Sept 2018). The first story was reprinted in Germany in 2018, and besides that, the Baron has never appeared in print outside of Finland.

Baron Thieving is an aristocratic baron who likes to lead a flamboyant playboy lifestyle and throw lavish parties. However, his wealth is long since gone, so he has to resort to crime to fund his lifestyle, and he steals money and other valuable items in secret.

Thieving is modelled after the classic "gentleman thief" character. He is also often accompanied by his pet dachshund Rollie.

== Dog characters ==
Characters resembling dogs are generally used in Disney comics as stand-ins for humans. They appear to be the most common race in Duckburg, although they most often appear as unnamed extras. Many historical figures who appear in Donald Duck comic stories as characters (see below) are also portrayed as dogs.

=== Albert Quackmore ===
Albert Quackmore (Battista in Italian; Baptist in Indian English and German) is Scrooge's butler in Italian, and more recently Egmont Disney comics. Quackmore is tall and has a long dog-nose, but humanlike ears. His hair is generally shown as being brown and curly. He is loyal and dedicated to his boss, Scrooge, and not rarely he is in trouble because of all this loyalty and dedication, creating invariably funny situations.

Quackmore's first official comic appearance was in the 1967 story "Zio Paperone e l'angolare di sicurezza" written by Rodolfo Cimino and illustrated by Massimo De Vita. Quackmore has become one of the most frequently recurring characters in Scrooge's Italian stories and he is quite popular among Italian comic readers.

=== Azure Blue ===
Azure Blue is a character who first appeared as an evil miser in the Barks story "The Golden Helmet" in Four Color #408 (July 1952). In that story, he was revealed to be a descendant of Olaf the Blue (Viking discoverer of America according to that story) and he wanted to find a Golden Helmet so he can be king of North America and make everyone on the continent his slaves, but Donald Duck and his nephews Huey, Dewey, and Louie would not let that happen. Azure was assisted by Lawyer Sharky. He also appeared in the 1995 Don Rosa story "The Lost Charts of Columbus", pulling a similar scam.

Azure also made a cameo appearance in Rosa's 1989 story "Return to Plain Awful" when he sees off the disguised Scrooge McDuck and Donald Duck and his three nephews at the Duckburg Airport, as well as the 1987 story "Nobody's Business", when Donald and the nephews had to find a more valuable treasure than the Golden Helmet.

Azure's kinship to Olaf is questionable, since his lawyer, instead of showing evidence of it, asked for evidence in contrary from whoever doubted Azure to be descendant of Olaf. When Donald and the nephews found what Blue and Sharky believed to be evidence that a Phoenician prince named Hanno and his kin are the real owners of North America, Azure renamed himself Azure Hanno Blue. It can make people think Blue to be a surname Azure gave himself in order to claim to descend from Olaf in the very first place.

=== Akers McCovet ===
Akers McCovet is a slimy crook specializing in fraudulently getting his oily hands on real estate, who appeared in the 1989 Don Rosa story "His Majesty, McDuck". When Scrooge McDuck, abusing a legal loophole, declared Killmotor Hill and his Money Bin an independent nation, McCovet realized that Scrooge's fortune was no longer protected by American laws, and the police would not intervene; the very land he could seize from Scrooge, since the old duck had not even bothered to write laws of his own. Therefore, McCovet hired the Beagle Boys as a miniature army and took over McDuckland. However, the Beagle Boys were eventually defeated by Huey, Dewey and Louie; without his minions, Akers was defenseless, and after a quick sword fight with Scrooge, he was forced to give up the crown and thrown out of McDuckland. He was meant to appear in The Lost Charts of Columbus, but was cut from the story.

=== Arpin Lusène ===
Arpin Lusène, nicknamed Le Chevalier Noir (The Black Knight), is a French gentleman, and a notorious thief with, naturally, a cheesy French accent which other characters have hard time understanding at times, often leading to wordplay. Apparently, Lusène even writes in his accent, spelling English words phonetically as he would pronounce them. According to Don Rosa, Lusène's cheesy French accent is an homage to Peter Sellers's portrayal of the character Jacques Clouseau in the Pink Panther films.

Lusène's home has been said to be a castle in Portofino on the Italian Riviera, although he has also been described as coming from the French Riviera.

He is a sticky fingered thief. On some occasions he is even seen stealing people's clothes while the victims are wearing them. His life's goal is to steal Scrooge McDuck's money, or make it disappear to make people think he stole it. His motive for this is to be remembered as the greatest thief ever to exist, rather than to make a profit out of it, as he has plenty of money already.

Lusène strictly refuses to appear in any photographs, claiming he has never been photographed. He likes to use his extreme dexterity to avoid being photographed. He once removed the filament from the lightbulb of a camera's flash, without breaking the bulb glass.

Usually on his appearances, Lusène wears an armor of a knight, almost completely covered in Gyro Gearloose's invention, a universal solvent which has the ability of absorbing all kinds of matter, excluding diamonds. Only Lusène's hands, feet, and the handle of his sword are not coated with the universal solvent, and even this only so that he will not accidentally dissolve the floor he walks on or his own sword.

Lusène has appeared in several stories, the first one being The Black Knight in 1998. This story was mainly the introduction to the character as well as a sequel to the story The Universal Solvent. As the main plot, Arpin comes to Duckburg in order to rob the Money Bin. His first attempt fails, however he steals the universal solvent and uses it to make his special armor to make another, successful attack on the Bin. Scrooge, with the help of Donald, Huey, Dewey, and Louie, manage to stop him. Lusène's next appearance was in the story Attaaaaaack in which Scrooge stops his new plot to raid the Money Bin thanks to an invention of Gyro's. His third appearance was in Rosa's The Black Knight GLORPS Again which is a direct sequel to events in The Black Knight and Arpin restores his suit in it. So far the only use of him by creators other than Don Rosa (such as Marco Rota) has been on covers.

Arpin is the only present day character that Don Rosa has created for the Duck Universe that has made more than one appearance.

His name comes from a spoonerism of Arsène Lupin, a fictional character from novels by Maurice Leblanc. The switcheroo spelling is ironic, partly because Leblanc himself once changed the spelling of the name of a character (who was "visiting", in a way, from the works of another author) from "Sherlock Holmes" to "Herlock Sholmes", in response to legal objections from Sherlock Holmes author Arthur Conan Doyle. In the Swedish translation, his name is "Armand Lutin", a play on "Arsène Lupin".

=== Beagle Boys ===
The Beagle Boys are a gang of criminals who are dedicated to an eternal, unsuccessful string of attempts to break into Scrooge's money bin and loot his fortune. Created by Carl Barks, the gang first appeared in the story "Terror of the Beagle Boys" (Walt Disney's Comics and Stories #134, November 1951), although in this story they only appear in the last frame and have no lines. The first story to feature the Beagle Boys in a major role is "Only a Poor Old Man" (Uncle Scrooge #1, March 1952), which serves as a template for virtually all future Beagle Boys appearances, and establishes them as a serious threat to Scrooge's fortune. One of the main figures in Scrooge's rogues gallery, the Beagle Boys have appeared in hundreds of stories created around the world, and even led their own comic book from 1964 to 1979.

==== Beagle Brats ====
The Beagle Brats are the nephews of the Beagle Boys, who first appeared in the 1965 story "That Motherly Feeling". They are a handful even for their equally-immoral parents, who often shift their guardianships to said main trio — who, in turn, have no idea how to deal with them. The Brats seem to have a rivalry against the Junior Woodchucks, each seeing the others as their polar opposite.

Though the triplets 1, 2 and 3 are usually the ones referred to as the Beagle Brats, there is evidence that any children of Beagle Boys who follow the family traditions at an early age can be referred to as Beagle Brats.

The Beagle Brats appear in the DuckTales episode "Take Me Out of the Ball Game", voiced by Brian Cummings, Chuck McCann, and Terry McGovern.

==== Blackheart Beagle ====
Blackheart Beagle, also known as Grandpa Beagle, is the grandfather, founder, and sometimes leader of the Beagle Boys. His first appearance was in the 1957 Carl Barks story "The Fantastic River Race" as Blackheart Beagle, and then showed up in the 1958 Barks story "The Money Well" as Grandpa Beagle.

Blackheart Beagle started his career of misdeeds and dishonestly as a pirate captain on the Mississippi; his beloved boat was known as the River Witch. He had a history of ransoming and plundering merchandise boat on the large river, and served as the archenemy of Pothole McDuck. However, when Pothole's young nephew Scrooge joined forces with his uncle, Blackheart and his sons (whom he used as his crew) had met their match and were finally arrested after having succeeded in blowing up Scrooge's own boat, the Dilly Dollar. Swearing revenge on the Scottish duck, Blackheart served his sentence and moved to Calisota with his sons and his wife, ruling the place by fear and making a decent loot out of what he could steal from the local hillbillies. Bad luck was apparently after him, as the place where Scrooge McDuck, now one of the World's largest fortunes (ans soon to be the largest), happened to be precisely the unknown corner of Calisota that Blackheart had elected as his territory. He was arrested again, and when he was released, the rural area he loved to terrorized had turned, thanks to Scrooge's financial impulse, into a San Francisco-esque metropolis in which he did not really belong anymore.

Blackheart Beagle was a Boss in the videogame The Duckforce Rises in 2015.

==== Penny Beagle ====
Penny Beagle is a young dognose girl and the daughter of the Beagle Boys' numerous cousins. She first appeared in 2005, in the Sergio Badino story "Arriva Penny". Unlike a majority of Beagle Boys, Penny is scrupulously honest and law-abiding (although she still wears a mask because of the family traditions), and she often visits her Duckburg uncles to try and redeem them.

==== Granny Beagle ====
Granny Beagle is the grandmother of the Beagle Boys. She closely resembles, and is often mistaken for Auntie Beagle, who is the aunt of the Beagle Boys. While the two are both featured mostly in comics, they are two separate characters. Granny first appeared in 1967 in a one-page gag in The Beagle Boys #5; her first full story was the 1969 story "The Flight of the Bumbleduck".

Granny has been featured in numerous comics, and acts as the leader of the Beagle Boys at times. She is usually the one to come up with schemes, whether for a great heist or a jailbreak.

==== Great Grandpappy Beagle ====
Great Grandpappy Beagle, also known as Great Great Grandpappy Beagle or Grandpappy Beagle, is the great grandfather of the Beagle Boys who only appears in the 1975 comic story "Scrooge For A Day", and was mentioned later in the same year in "The Deep Sea Deed". He has the prison number “1”, is greatly trusted by later generations of Beagles, which is perhaps somewhat foolish of them, as, being a Beagle, Great-Grandpappy is as shifty as they come. Prone to telling stories about the clan's past, he once told the Duckburg trio about their ancestor Beegul's ownership of all the water in the world.

He makes his animated debut in the 2017 DuckTales series episode, "Last Christmas!" (voiced by Eric Bauza), ordering his great-grandchildren to steal all presents during Christmas party.

=== Captain Ramrod ===
Captain Ramrod is a strong, broad-shouldered, square-jawed woman who used to work as an army engineer. When she retired, she became a troop leader for the Chickadees Patrol, putting her background knowledge (and intimidating discipline) to good use. Ramrod shares most of the Chickadees' strong rivalry with the Junior Woodchucks, and, while she is too honorable to truly cheat, she is not above striking when the Woodchucks are down, such as challenging them at a woodcraft contest just when their woodcraft counsellor was unavailable.

=== Chisel McSue ===
Chisel McSue is an enemy of Scrooge McDuck. Scrooge almost lost his fortune because he could not produce a single heirloom. He also accused Scrooge of not being a true Scot. Scrooge and his nephews managed to defeat him after staging a mock Battle of Culloden.

In the DuckTales episode Down and Out in Duckburg, a character named Fritter O'Way with the same background took over Scrooge's fortune until Scrooge recovered the cargo sunk with Seafoam McDuck's ship, the Golden Goose.

His ancestor, Swindle McSue, is the guy who sabotaged Seafoam McDuck's boat in 1776. Because of that incident Scrooge almost lost his fortune.

=== Doe Boys ===
The Doe Boys are a pair of crooks created by Dick Kinney and Al Hubbard. They appeared for the first time in a story featuring 0.0. Duck & Mata Harrier, "Picnic". Most of the American stories where they took park were drawn by Tony Strobl, who revamped the original look of this duo, developed by Hubbard. They had a more human-like look and Strobl made them look like Carl Barks's dognoses (human faces with dog snouts). Besides, one of them became quite shorter than the original character. Strobl used the Doe Boys in various comic stories for the market outside of the US during the 1970s whose events invariably also involved Donald Duck, his cousin Fethry and Uncle Scrooge McDuck. Donald and Fethry are generally working as reporters for Scrooge McDuck's newspaper, the Duckburg Chronicle, in those stories. Daisy Duck eventually also meets the Doe Boys, sometimes working also as a reporter for Scrooge's newspaper, sometimes working as a policewoman. Brazilian comic artists also produced various stories where the Doe Boys appear.

The Doe Boys were used in two comic stories written by Lars Jensen and drawn by the Spanish cartoonist José Maria Manrique during the 2000s. More two stories with them written by Jensen were published in 2014.

=== Neighbor Jones ===
Neighbor J. Jones is Donald Duck's next door neighbor. He is portrayed as being as short-tempered as Donald, and more truculent. The yard between their respective homes often becomes a battlefield. The usual setting would be some argument or fight which would result in a huge mess for both Jones and Donald. Donald once even thought taking a vacation on a cruise ship would get him thousands of miles away from Jones and other problems, only to realize Jones bought a ticket on the same cruise by coincidence. The captain of the ship, however, is quick to extinguish bickering by threatening to throw both in the brig, and later on Donald and Neighbor Jones actually have to work together when they are stranded at sea.

The character first appeared in Walt Disney's Comics and Stories #34 (in July 1943). There and in later issues, he tended to appear in stories featuring Donald Duck. Neighbor Jones was the first of many recurring characters that Carl Barks created. Jones has since appeared in hundreds of additional stories, with writers Paul Halas (UK) and Jan Kruse (Netherlands) among the most frequent to use the character. The character has made more appearances in American comics.

Although Neighbor Jones is largely an adversary, he will be pleasant with Donald on occasion, such as Donald offering Jones money to clear his yard during a snowstorm after seeing how efficiently Jones had shoveled his own driveway. Jones does the job, and courteously announces he is finished after Donald presents payment.

In various Italian stories Jones is replaced by a similar character named Anacleto Mitraglia, who is taller and narrower than Jones, but with a similar personality and practically the same rivalry with Donald. Jones is actually rarely used in Italian stories. Mitraglia evolved from one of several names given to the real Jones in early Barks stories.

In one Barks story ("Outfoxed Fox" in Uncle Scrooge #6, 1954), Jones was given the full name Jughead Jones. However, this caused a copyright conflict with Archie Comics (one character has the same name) and the name was quickly discontinued.

He makes his animated debut in the 2017 DuckTales series episode, "Whatever Happened to Donald Duck?!" (voiced by James Adomian), as Donald's anger management counselor, whom Donald's nephew Dewey Duck and the boy's friend Webby Vanderquack run into while chasing down a mystery to solve.

=== Stella Curfew ===
Stella Curfew (Finnish: Jaana Kapula) is a police officer who appears in the Grandma Duck stories where the latter solves mysteries. The character was invented by Kari Korhonen and was the first Donald Duck character invented in Finland.

=== Scottie McTerrier ===
Scottie McTerrier was appointed caretaker of the McDuck Castle by Scrooge McDuck in 1902. He died in 1948. Sometime after Scottie died, Matilda McDuck took over the castle.

His name was first mentioned in The Old Castle's Secret by Carl Barks, but his true first appearance was in The Life and Times of Scrooge McDuck, Part 9: The Billionaire of Dismal Downs, by Don Rosa.

=== Jeeves ===
Jeeves (Italian: Lusky) is John D. Rockerduck's secretary. The character was created in Italy in the 1970s. Rockerduck depends greatly on him, much in the same way as Scrooge McDuck depends on his butler Albert Quackmore. Unlike Scrooge, Rockerduck has rarely been shown to have any family, so when Rockerduck goes on an adventure, Jeeves fills the role of a supporting adventurer, which would be served by Donald Duck in Scrooge's case.

Jeeves is usually drawn to appear slightly younger than Quackmore, with short black hair. Like Quackmore, Jeeves takes great pride in being a dedicated helper of his boss, but he will sometimes resort to criminal activity if pressed to by his master. Rockerduck and Jeeves have worn different disguises to trick Scrooge in some Italian stories. Jeeves has been shown confiding with Quackmore, without the consent or knowledge of either of their respective bosses.

In earlier Italian stories, Jeeves' appearance varied depending on the story, in some cases resembling Quackmore in body shape.

Jeeves made has first animated appearance in the 2017 DuckTales series episode, "The Outlaw Scrooge McDuck!", voiced by Keith Ferguson and reimagined as Rockerduck's muscular enforcer. He later reappears as an agent of F.O.W.L., having been artificially reconstructed as "Frankenjeeves" to act as Rockerduck's caretaker while he is in suspended animation.

=== Maurice Mattressface ===
Maurice Mattressface first appeared in the story The Fabulous Philosopher's Stone (Uncle Scrooge #10, 1955). In that story he confiscated the stone from Scrooge McDuck because he was afraid that he might use it to wreck the Gold Market. In The Crown of the Crusader Kings (2001) by Don Rosa, he was shown as working for Mr. Molay as an employee of The International Money Council. In The Old Castle's Other Secret or A Letter From Home (2004), he betrays his boss after finding out that he wants to use the treasure of Castle McDuck for evil purposes.

=== McViper Clan ===
The McViper Clan first appeared in Uncle Scrooge #56 in The Mystery of the Ghosttown Railroad. In that story they try to scare Scrooge McDuck and his nephews with ravens dressed as ghosts, in order to steal the deeds to the local railroad. When a defense contractor wishes to acquire the railroad track for rocket testing, this causes a significant increase in the railroad's shares, meaning a tremendous windfall for Scrooge and a few other residents of the Western town of Goldopolis, who were the only investors. The McViper gang attempted to steal the deeds in order to prevent sale of the railroad track, and that modern changes in Goldopolis would mean the end of the memories of them as outlaws. Actually only one of them appeared in that story and his name was Copperhead McViper, and stated he was the last McViper due to the rest of the gang having died of old age. Another McViper by the name of Snake McViper appeared in The Cattle King in Uncle Scrooge #69 where he tried to antagonize Scrooge and his nephews. Surprisingly Snake is a pignose and not a dogface like Copperhead. Don Rosa used The McViper Clan in The Life and Times of Scrooge Part 3 where two of them who go by the names Snake Eyes and Haggis infiltrate Murdo Mackenzie and his posse while they plan to rustle Murdo's prize bull Vindicator but Scrooge outwits them. This is supposedly the first encounter that Scrooge has had with The McViper Clan. Either Snake Eyes or Haggis is the father of Copperhead but it is unknown which one. In Part 11 Copperhead and two of his brothers try to steal some papers from Scrooge but they do not succeed.

The name McViper is a pun on the word viper, a type of venomous snake.

All of The McVipers' names have references to snakes, except for Haggis, which is a Scottish dish.

Snake is obviously not related to the rest of The McViper Clan. He just has the same last name as the rest of them, since he happens to be a pig and the rest of them are dogs. It may be possible the brothers accepted him into their gang and allowed him to use "McViper" in order to show his gang membership.

It is unknown whether or not The McViper Clan appeared in any stories other than the aforementioned stories written by Carl Barks and Don Rosa.

=== Mr. Molay ===
Mr. Molay is a comics character who first appeared in the story The Crown of the Crusader Kings in Uncle Scrooge #339. In that story he is known to be the head of The International Money Council. He and his associate Maurice Mattressface confiscate a crown from Scrooge McDuck and his nephews. He also appears in the story titled The Old Castle's Other Secret or A Letter From Home, in which he and Maurice plan to steal the treasure from Scrooge's old ancestral castle and using Scrooge's sister Matilda to get it. Later in that story Maurice betrayed Mr. Molay.

Mr. Molay has only appeared in these two stories. He is named after Jacques de Molay, last Grand Master of the Knights Templar.

=== Whiskerville Clan ===
The Whiskerville Clan first appeared in Uncle Scrooge #29 in "Hound of the Whiskervilles" by Carl Barks, where Scrooge McDuck and his nephews find out that the Whiskervilles have been using their hound costume to frighten The Clan McDuck for centuries. The hound ruse caused the McDuck family to vacate the castle in 1675, giving the Whiskervilles opportunity to search for hidden treasure. At the end of that story Scrooge and the last member of the Whiskerville family eventually become friends.

The Whiskervilles returned in The Life and Times of Scrooge McDuck Parts 1, 5, and 9, where they continued to antagonize The McDucks. In Part 1, they run Scrooge and his father off by using the hound costume, but Scrooge gets back at them by impersonating the Ghost of Sir Quackly McDuck. In Part 5, they try to steal a bank draft from Scrooge so they can legally buy Castle McDuck to tear it down, but Scrooge stops them with supernatural help from the ghosts of his ancestors. In Part 9, only one Whiskerville appears, but he does not cause too much trouble in that story. He appears as a sheep owner while Scrooge competes in a Scottish games sheep shearing contest. After that the Whiskervilles do not make any more appearances in the Scrooge McDuck story line.

== Human characters ==
These characters are not anthropomorphic animals but actual (or former) humans.

=== Bombie the Zombie ===
Bombie the Zombie first appeared in the story "Voodoo Hoodoo" in Four Color #238 (1949). In that story, Bombie gives a voodoo doll to Donald Duck, thinking that Donald is Scrooge McDuck. Bombie was sent by a witch doctor named Foola Zoola to get revenge on Scrooge for destroying his village many years ago. Huey, Dewey, and Louie befriended the zombie and helped him get back to Africa while Donald tried to find a cure for the Voodoo Curse, eventually succeeding. Though he had been sent after Scrooge, Bombie never came in direct contact with Scrooge during this story.

In Don Rosa's The Life and Times of Scrooge McDuck, Part 11, it was revealed that Bombie had been stalking Scrooge for decades prior to "Voodoo Hoodoo". In order to force Foola Zoola to sell him some valuable rubber plantation land, Scrooge hired a gang of thugs and destroyed Zoola's village. Scrooge then disguised himself and tricked Zoola long enough to close the deal by making Zoola think the land would be safe with him. Zoola realized the trick, and set Bombie on Scrooge. After the first time Bombie found him, Scrooge turned back to his normal look, keeping Bombie from recognizing him and explaining why Bombie would later mistake Donald for Scrooge (in "Voodoo Hoodoo"). Although this saved Scrooge from the curse, Bombie continued to pursue Scrooge thanks to Zoola's magic. Bombie followed Scrooge to the North Pole, an iceberg near the RMS Titanic, and finally to the isle of Ripan Taro. Cornered by the zombie, Scrooge agreed to give a local sorcerer the valuable candy-stripped ruby in exchange for a spell to trap Bombie on Ripan Taro for 30 years. Scrooge took the deal, assuming that the curse would wear off by the time Bombie could leave the island. Except for a few cameos, Bombie did not make any further appearances in The Life and Times of Scrooge McDuck, but later returned in a dream where Scrooge had a flashback of the Titanic scene.

Bombie made his animation debut in the DuckTales episode "The Richest Duck in the World", voiced by Fred Tatasciore. This version of Bombie's pursuit of Scrooge is the result of a general curse that afflicts whoever is the richest person in the world at any given time. Though he could not defeat it, Scrooge managed to trap Bombie on a deserted island and sealed him away within an enchanted bin. However, when Scrooge's great-nephew Louie Duck gets his hands on his great-uncle's fortune as the result of a previous episode and uses the money for frivolous means, he inadvertently cuts the "magical security" budget funding the trap, releasing Bombie. After going on an unstoppable rampage, Bombie is only stopped when Louie and Scrooge show humility and learn that wealth cannot solve all of one's problems; giving the monster a shoe-shine before he departs from Duckburg and dispels the curse. This version of Bombie also appears in the DuckTales comic "Under The Cover of Can'tarctica!", where McDuck and Beakley confront him during their time as spies.

=== Hard Haid Moe ===
Hard Haid Moe is a hillbilly and unlike most other characters in the Donald Duck universe indubitably a human being. Moe was created by Dick Kinney and Al Hubbard. His first appearance was in the story It's music (1964). In the 1960s and 1970s, he was used in various comic stories, usually as a supporting character for Fethry Duck, Donald Duck and Scrooge McDuck. Fethry is actually one of very few townspeople ever befriended by Moe, but their relation is not exactly friendly. Most of those stories were drawn by Tony Strobl. However, Moe would eventually disappear from North American and European stories, but became popular in Brazil, where he even had his own title (Urtigão) from 1987 to 1994. In Italy, where he is called Dinamite Bla, his appearances has become more frequent since the 2000s (decade) and he has even gained a small Italian figurine from a special collection with various Disney characters simply called Disney Collection, made by De Agostini.

Hard Haid Moe lives somewhere on Calisota's countryside with his rather flabby dog, Houn' Dawg. Moe is often seen carrying a shotgun. Brazilian cartoonists created a permanent female character for Moe's stories, a funny maid called Firmina (original Brazilian name), who is reluctantly hired by Moe in the story "Uma Intrusa Especiar" (free translation: "An Unusual Newcomer"), and because of her strong and daring personality she is often arguing with Moe, who in turn has a very hard temperament. She became a kind of non-official girlfriend of Moe, including she almost married him.

In the Brazilian story A Mana do Urtigão (free translation: "Moes sister") written by Renato Canini and illustrared y Verci de Mello), a sister of Moe named Terta makes her appearance, who defines herself as an "intellectual" and ill adapts to the lifestyle of the mountaineer.

Amy Lou is the name of Moe's niece who appeared in the comic story "Marriage Mountain-style" by Dick Kinney and Al Hubbard. In this story she wants to find a husband, and Donald and Fethry become involuntarially her suitors.

In Italian stories, Moe has a neighbor and rival named Truz, a dogface character who wears a tuxedo and a crooked top hat.

In Dinamite Bla in: Una questione di famiglia e melanzane published in Topolino #2905 ( August 2011), written by Roberto Gagnor and illustrated by Andrea Freccero, several relatives are presented, such as Dynamite Smack (cousin) and Spingarda (aunt).

Topolino #2782 of 2009 published a genealogical tree of the ancestors of Hard Haid Moe is proposed.

=== Witch Hazel ===
Witch Hazel as seen in Trick or Treat, her debut appearance

Witch Hazel is a fictional character appearing in productions of The Walt Disney Company. She first appeared in the Donald Duck cartoon Trick or Treat in 1952, voiced by June Foray, where she helps Huey, Dewey, and Louie get candy from Donald. She also appeared in the Carl Barks's comic book adaptation and two sequels to that story, "Too Late for Christmas" in Donald Duck Adventures (Gladstone Series) #30 in December 1994 and "The Poorest Duck in Duckburg" in Donald Duck Adventures (Gladstone Series) #35 in October 1995.

Witch Hazel has a broom named Beelzebub, which acts as both her servant and her mode of transport. In Disney comics she appeared as working with other Disney witches such as Magica De Spell and Mad Madam Mim.

Witch Hazel has also appeared in various Italian Disney comics, where she is called Nocciola (Italian for "hazelnut"; full name Nocciola Vildibranda Crapomena), notably those by Luciano Bottaro.

Her name, a pun on the name of the North American shrub and the herbal medicine derived from it, witch hazel, has been commonly used for the names of cartoon witches; Warner Bros., MGM, Famous Studios, and the Little Lulu comic book also had characters named "Witch Hazel", and Rembrandt Films had one named "Hazel Witch". Animator Chuck Jones, of his own admission, got the idea of Looney Tunes' Witch Hazel from the Disney short, creating a different character but again using June Foray for the voice.

The Disney Witch Hazel had a very different appearance from her Looney Tunes counterpart. She is short, has a hairy, warty chin and a large red nose with green eyes. She wears a long blonde wig (although occasionally it is grey), dresses in archetypal black witches clothes, and her hat is very tall. She is also far more benevolent than the Looney Tunes version.

In the United States, the Disney Witch Hazel never became as popular as Magica De Spell or Mad Madam Mim. But, in Italian Disney comics, she has been for a long time an oft-used and well-liked character. Usually, her stories show her interactions not with the Duck Clan (Italian stories pairing Witch Hazel with Donald Duck include Il dottor Paperus, parody of Goethe's Faust in the 1950s, its distant sequel Paperino e il seguito della storia, published in 1999, and Paperin Furioso, a parody of Orlando Furioso published in 1966), but with Goofy. This is due to her irritation at Goofy's staunch refusal to believe in magic or witches of any sort, believing instead that real magic is the same as regular trick magic, and that those claiming to be magicians (including Hazel) are crazy. This leads to several amusing adventures where Hazel uses every spell in the book to try to convince Goofy of the existence of "real" magic, despite continued failure.

Despite being originally a good character, she appears to be the first boss in the North American version of the NES game Mickey Mousecapade (replacing Cheshire Cat from the original Japanese version).

Witch Hazel appeared as a guest in the television series House of Mouse. She also appears among the audience in the direct-to-video film Mickey's House of Villains (where the characters also watch the short Trick or Treat during the film's plot).

Witch Hazel appears in the stop-motion television special Mickey and Friends Trick or Treats, where on Halloween night she transforms Mickey, Minnie, Donald, Daisy and Goofy into the costumes they are wearing.

In one 1965 story ("The Dime From Uncle" from The Beagle Boys #2), she was known as Wanda Witch.

=== J. Audubon Woodlore ===
J. Audubon Woodlore is the park ranger of Brownstone National Park (a play on Yellowstone National Park), one of the features of which is a geyser named "Old Fateful" (a play on Old Faithful). He was originally voiced by Bill Thompson. Woodlore's name is an inside joke-reference to John James Audubon, the famous 19th Century ornithologist/naturalist/painter. He is currently voiced by Corey Burton and Jeff Bennett.

He first appeared in two 1954 Donald Duck cartoons Grin and Bear It and Grand Canyonscope. (It is revealed in the latter that Woodlore was a postal worker prior to his Ranger days.) One year later, in Beezy Bear, he repeatedly admonishes Humphrey the Bear "You bathe too much!", not realising that the bear is really just hiding in the pond from the bees whose honey he was trying to steal.

Woodlore prides himself on running a tight ship and is frequently oblivious to those (particularly Donald) who are humiliated and/or insulted by his constant scoldings and criticisms. Despite his somewhat authoritarian attitude, he cares about the bears as if they were his children...although he once bamboozled them into cleaning up the park for him (so that he could nap in a hammock) by singing the jazzy ditty "In the Bag". When Woodlore's lazy motive became apparent, Humphrey irritably dropped him into a trashcan.

Most of the bears are respectful of Woodlore, except Humphrey the Bear, whom the Ranger often lectures.

The Ranger also made an appearance in Down and Out With Donald Duck (also known as A Duckumentary), a mockumentary about Donald Duck's infamous temper, where he is out of uniform, now working in an employment agency where Donald seeks a job.

Woodlore's name appeared on the entrance sign at Disneyland's Bear Country land, as the resident park ranger and can also be heard doing the safety spiel for Grizzly River Run at Disney California Adventure after a 2019 refurbishment.

Woodlore appears as a guest in the television series House of Mouse. Woodlore had a cameo in the film Ralph Breaks the Internet in the OhMyDisney.com webpage. He also appears in the special episode "The Wonderful Autumn of Mickey Mouse" from The Wonderful World of Mickey Mouse. Woodlore also has a cameo appearance in the short film Once Upon a Studio.

== Pig characters ==
=== Herbert ===
Herbert is a not especially bright pig friend of Huey, Dewey, and Louie Duck. He first appeared in Walt Disney's Comics and Stories #43 in the Donald Duck story entitled "Three Dirty Little Ducks".

He then appeared in a few other Barks stories, including "The Fifty Dollar Dime" in Walt Disney's Comics and Stories #50. He has recently made appearances in Disney comics produced in the Netherlands.

=== Porker Hogg ===
Porker Hogg is a rival of Angus Pothole McDuck. He hired the original Beagle Boys to destroy McDuck's boat but then they double crossed him. Porker's nephew Horseshoe Hogg challenged Scrooge McDuck to finish the race their uncles started in 1870, but in the imaginary part of Ducktales, he was a thug who worked for the Beagle Boys.

=== Argus McSwine ===
Argus McSwine is an enemy of Scrooge McDuck and Donald Duck. He appears in many stories, both by Carl Barks and others. Sometimes he has the Beagle Boys working for him. His first appearance was in Forbidden Valley by Carl Barks, published in Donald Duck #54.

McSwine has appeared in many Egmont-produced Disney stories in which he antagonizes Donald more than he does Scrooge. Argus is a lot like Neighbor Jones in this function—except that he does not live next door to Donald, and is often a crook or con man (whereas Jones is generally on the side of law and order). Often portrayed as rich, McSwine sometimes competes with Scrooge for some type of prize in much the way that Flintheart Glomgold or John D. Rockerduck also do.

Argus is in fact one of the most evil villains in the Scrooge stories, having openly shot at the ducks and threatened them with harm in a manner that the Beagle Boys rarely do.

From the 1950s to the 1980s, McSwine had no consistent name and was known only as "the pig villain", going by a number of one-time aliases including John the Con and Porkman De Lardo.

The last name McSwine comes from Carl Barks' Donald the Milkman. In 1990, then-editor Bob Foster published that story for the first time in the US. At the same time, the decision was taken that McSwine should be the character's "real" name, with the first name Argus being added at the same time. Thus the pig villain has remained Argus McSwine in many other stories through 2010, with only the occasional alias used in more modern times (Lardo J. Porkington in Lars Jensen's The Nest Egg).

=== Peter Pig ===
Peter Pig is a fictional pig in Disney short films and comics of the 1930s. He was introduced in The Wise Little Hen (1934), in which he was the lazy and greedy friend of his much more famous fellow first-appearance character, Donald Duck. Peter Pig's second Disney film appearance was in The Band Concert (1935), in which Peter played tuba and other similar pig called Paddy Pig played the trumpet. Peter's third and last appearance in a short film was in The Riveter (1940), as the riveter who is fired by Pete at the beginning of the story. Peter later made a cameo in a Toontown scene of Who Framed Roger Rabbit during "Smile, Darn Ya, Smile".

The brief film career was followed by a just as brief comics career. Federico Pedrocchi, the Italian who created the first long Donald Duck comics in the magazine Donald Duck and Other Adventures (Paperino e altre avventure), used Peter Pig as Donald's sidekick in three stories: Special Correspondent (1938), Paperino fra i pellirosse (1939) and Paperino chiromante (1939).

In the Garden area of Disney Castle in Kingdom Hearts II, there is a topiary sculpture of Peter Pig.

Peter Pig also appears on one of the first artworks for the video game Epic Mickey.

=== Pig Mayor ===
The Pig Mayor is an anthropomorphic pig whose name was actually created especially to refer to the character in Carl Barks's stories who governs the fictional city of Duckburg. Barks never worried about naming this mayor, including using dogfaces with different looks to be shown as mayors of Duckburg in early comic stories, and he never named them, too. Despite all the irrelevance that Barks used to give to this creation, the Pig Mayor became an essential character in this particular universe, being largely used in Italian and Danish comic stories. He is also a recurring character in Brazilian and Dutch ones. In Italy, the look of the Pig Mayor has changed a bit through the years and some cartoonists have drawn him with brown hair. He has been used in various Italian stories where Scrooge McDuck and John D. Rockerduck both are involved in some competition.

=== Soapy Slick ===
Soapy Slick is the crooked saloon operator and profiteer in the Scrooge McDuck comic series, modeled after Jefferson Randolph "Soapy" Smith of Skagway, Alaska. He is one of the oldest of Scrooge McDuck's enemies. He was introduced by Carl Barks in "North of the Yukon" (Uncle Scrooge #59, September 1965).

Don Rosa's The Life and Times of Scrooge McDuck Chapter 8: The King of the Klondike documents Scrooge's Alaskan prospecting days . In 1896, Scrooge secures a loan from Soapy. Soapy, being a saloon owner on land and water (he owns a gambling boat), has plenty of money to lend. Of course, at a more than suitable interest rate (it was 10% at the turn of the 20th century). Soapy then swindles Scrooge — the pocket of land Scrooge wants to pan on has already been identified as having no gold — and Soapy goes ahead and gives him the loan anyway. Soapy adds another 0 to the 10 and makes the interest on the loan 100% and then tries to collect on the loan in Uncle Scrooge #59. Luckily, Scrooge manages to produce the loan-paid receipt.

Eventually, Scrooge goes to the Yukon and strikes gold in Uncle Scrooge #292. However, he is kidnapped by Soapy, who binds Scrooge to the smokestack of the casino boat with chains and taunts Scrooge by making fun of Scrooge's dead mother. Scrooge becomes enraged and tears the smokestack down by pulling on the chains, sinking Soapy's casino boat.

== Other anthropomorphic characters ==
=== Tachyon Farflung ===
Tachyon Farflung is a monkey-like alien whose first appearance was in the Danish comic story "The Terror From Outer Space", where he becomes a relatively important foe of Scrooge McDuck. Tachyon is shown as a notorious intergalactic thief who hid himself on the planet Melbar, described as crime capital of the universe. He discovers Scrooge's fortune by using an interstellar spyscope. Then Tachyon comes to Earth on his spaceship determined to steal Scrooge's Money Bin. Like Princess Oona, Tachyon Farflung is a comic character developed through a partnership between the Swedish couple Stefan and Unn Printz-Påhlson and the Chilean cartoonist Vicar. Tachyon's original skin color is green, but some countries showed him with light creamy skin. This character appeared in more than five comic stories.

=== Woimly Filcher ===
Woimly Filcher is an anthropomorphic male cat created by William Van Horn who is similar to another Disney character, Pete. He appeared for the first time in the Danish story "Deck Us All!", where he is shown as a close friend of Jones. Nevertheless, this fellowship was not explored in any of Woimly's later stories. Woimly is always smoking a cigar like the original Pete used to do. He became a relatively important rival to Donald Duck. Woimly likes to provoke Donald by showing unbearable arrogance when they are in some contest against each other.

=== Pete ===
Pete is a large, menacing anthropomorphic black cat who appears in several Donald Duck short films rivaling Donald, a recurring role in them being that of a Sergeant in Donald's platoon in short films in which Donald is a private in the army. In DuckTales he appears embodying several different characters. He is usually more closely associated with the Mickey Mouse universe where he has remained a central figure since Steamboat Willie.

=== Lawyer Sharky ===
Sylvester J. Sharky appears to be an anthropomorphic rat, with a huge droop-snoot nose upon which a pair of pince-nez spectacles are perched.

In The Golden Helmet (1952), the first story in which he appears, he provides legal advice to Azure Blue, who claims to be owner of North America, because he is a descendant of Olaf the Blue, a Viking explorer who discovered America in 901 AD. Whenever Sharky was asked to prove his client (Blue or whoever he was working for) to descend from Olaf, he replies asking the questioner to prove he is not.

Sharky often speaks in fake legal Latin, like "Hocus, locus, jocus", which means "To the landlord belong the doorknobs".

Lawyer Sharky seldom has a large role, but he is often seen in cameo appearances.

In The Lost Charts of Columbus, believing a Phoenician prince named Hanno to have made a claim to North America before anybody else, he helped Azure Blue, now Azure "Hanno" Blue, to "prove" his kinship to Hanno.

In The Poorest Duck in Duckburg he helps Scrooge McDuck cancel Halloween by spending his money on all the Halloween stuff in Duckburg.

=== Red Eye and his brother ===
Red Eye and his brother are two ratfaced thugs who were introduced as pirates in Donald Duck Finds Pirate Gold (October, 1942). They typically serve as henchmen under Black Pete or other villains with more dominant personalities.

== Animals ==
This section contains animal characters who act like animals, unlike the majority of characters in this article, who are highly anthropomorphized animals that act like humans.

=== Aracuan Bird ===
The Aracuan Bird, also called the Clown of the Jungle, first appeared in the feature film The Three Caballeros (1944); though, despite his apparent on-screen popularity, strangely he did not appear in the comic book adaptation of that film. The Aracuan Bird is depicted as a mischievous and psychopathic screwball whose sole intentions are to annoy Donald Duck through a limitless variety of fourth wall breaking maneuvers and psychological warfare, similar in personality to Daffy Duck. The Aracuan appears again in Clown of the Jungle (1947), and then once more in the "Blame it on the Samba" segment from the film Melody Time (1948) where he attempts to cheer up the "blue" (literally) Donald Duck and José Carioca. Like Panchito Pistoles and José Carioca, the Aracuan Bird is primarily known only from these three films in the US.

However, he has found some success in comics from Brazil where he is known as Folião. More recently the Aracuan Bird has appeared in Mickey Mouse Works and House of Mouse, and is a regular cast member in Legend of the Three Caballeros as "Ari the Caretaker". He causes hilarious practical jokes and dons various disguises (including posing as Donald Duck). Often Donald is shown trying to take a photo of the bird, with it evading his efforts. In Norway & Sweden the cartoon Clown of the Jungle is shown as part of the From All of Us to All of You, a Disney Christmas special shown on television every Christmas Eve at 3 pm, although the Swedish censorship edits out the part where Donald attacks the Aracuan with a machine gun.

=== Billy Goat ===
Billy Goat is one of the various farm animals that are treated as pets by Grandma Duck, but he certainly is the most known one. Billy is always ready to hit intruders with his horns. He was used by Carl Barks in ten stories of the comic series "Grandma Duck's Farm Friends".

=== Bolivar ===
Bolivar is a non-anthropomorphic St. Bernard dog belonging to Donald Duck. He first appeared in the Mickey Mouse cartoon Alpine Climbers where he rescued Pluto from freezing in the snow, the two later found by Mickey and Donald to be drunk on Bolivar's own brandy. He also appeared in the Silly Symphonies cartoon More Kittens under the name "Tolivar".

Later on he appeared in the newspaper comic strips as Donald's dog. Ever since 1938, Bolivar has been a prominent member of the Duck family. He has even been used by Carl Barks as a companion for Huey, Dewey and Louie, and appears now and then in recent stories (the artist Daniel Branca had Bolivar as one of his favorite characters).

In some comic strips Bolivar had a son named Behemoth, who disappeared without a trace later on.

Bolivar has also been called Bornworthy and Bernie, as his name is rather controversial for being a Disney character (see Simón Bolívar). Nevertheless, from 1992 onward the original name Bolivar has almost always been used in the United States.

He is thought to have been created by Al Taliaferro.

=== Bootle Beetle ===
Bootle Beetle is a "bootle beetle" who appears in cartoon shorts as an old man telling his grandson flashback stories of his youth and Donald Duck serves as his nemesis. He first appeared in Bootle Beetle (1947) dodging Donald's attempts to catch him for his bug collection. In his next short Sea Salts (1949), he is a long time friend of Donald, both of them marooned on an island. His next appearance is in The Greener Yard (1949), in which he is tempted to have a go at Donald's vegetables. In his final appearance in Morris the Midget Moose (1950), he narrates the story of the same name. Another "bootle beetle" named Herman appears in the Disneyland anthology series version of Mickey and the Beanstalk narrated by his friend Ludwig von Drake.

=== Chip 'n' Dale ===
Chip and Dale are two anthropomorphic chipmunks who appear in several Donald Duck short films. In other cartoons they are antagonists against Pluto, and on very rare occasions Mickey Mouse.

=== General Snozzie ===
General Snozzie is the official bloodhound for the Junior Woodchucks of Duckburg. He has the ability to sniff out a substance on command. He sometimes joins Huey, Dewey, and Louie, Donald Duck, and Scrooge McDuck on their adventures.

He first appeared in Walt Disney's Comics and Stories #213 in the story Dodging Miss Daisy by Carl Barks, where he helped Daisy Duck and the boys track down Donald. In the story W.H.A.D.A.L.O.T.T.A.J.A.R.G.O.N. by Don Rosa, General Snozzie was just a puppy; back then he was called Major Snozzie. General Snozzie was not the only mascot of The Junior Woodchucks. Bolivar was a Junior Woodchucks mascot at one point, and Pluto also was a Junior Woodchucks mascot in some stories.

=== Hortense ===
Hortense was Scrooge McDuck's horse during his adventures in his youth. The mare was originally named Widowmaker, belonging to Murdo McKenzie. When Scrooge wanted to enlist as a cowboy in McKenzie's payroll, McKenzie offered him the job if he could successfully manage to ride his most violent-tempered horse. Scrooge would have fallen off the horse like everyone else before him, but his belt was accidentally caught in the saddle knob, keeping him in the saddle while the horse did her utmost to throw him off. Impressed by Scrooge's performance, McKenzie enlisted him as a cowboy and gave him the horse Widowmaker as a gift. Impressed by the horse's temper, Scrooge renamed her Hortense after his little sister, claiming both had equally bad tempers (much to his sister's chagrin). Tamed by Scrooge, Hortense later expressed impressive skills in galloping very fast, keeping her calm in dire situations and even controlling other animals.

=== Houn' Dawg ===
Houn' Dawg is Hard Haid Moe's very loyal but very lazy dog.

=== Humphrey the Bear ===
Humphrey is a bear who appears in several Donald Duck short films. Humphrey was the first boss in the Game Boy Color version of Donald Duck: Goin' Quackers, in home console versions of game Humphrey himself is the chaser in a Duckie Mountain's level and replaced by Bernadette the Chicken as the boss, however, a different brown bear replaces him in Duckie Mountain 3 as the chaser of the game Donald Duck Advance.

=== Louie the Mountain Lion ===
Louie is a buffoonish and sometimes grumpy mountain lion who is an occasional enemy of Donald and Goofy. His cartoons often see him chasing after either Donald Duck or Goofy. He rivals Donald in Lion Around (1950), Hook, Lion and Sinker (1950), and Grand Canyonscope (1954).

=== Ottoperotto ===
Ottoperotto is the Beagle Boys' pet dog. Unlike Pluto, Ottoperotto has a criminal mindset.

=== Poochie ===
Poochie is Fethry Duck's dog, who has an over-friendly personality. He appeared in some 1970s stories drawn by Tony Strobl. Some Brazilian cartoonists also used Fethry's little-known pet.

=== Porpy ===
Porpy is Moby Duck's nice and smart porpoise.

=== Ratface ===
Ratface is Magica De Spell's raven. He is different from the raven named Poe in DuckTales, who is Magica's brother.

=== Ratty ===
Ratty was the Beagle Boys' pet cat. He first appears in "Sentimental Journey" by Tony Strobl, in which the Beagle Boys try to shoot at him through a door, thinking that they were being raided. This, however, causes significant damage to their hideout. Most of his later appearances were drawn by Jack Manning, appearing in twelve comics in the "Beagle Boys" series.

Other instances of him include two comics by Peter Alvarado; "Ratty's Birthday Party" and "The Guardian Sword", one Italian comic, written by Ivan Saidenberg; "O Gato Gatuno" ("Cat Thief"), and one "Uncle Scrooge" series comic, drawn by Kay Wright; "The Stuffed Mattress", of which is his last appearance.

=== Spike the Bee ===
Spike, also called as Buzz-Buzz or Barrington, is a small aggressive bee who is frequently an enemy of Donald and Pluto. In many of his appearances he is on a quest to gather food. He appears in Window Cleaners (1940), Home Defense (1943), Pluto's Blue Note (1947), Inferior Decorator (1948), Bubble Bee (1949), Honey Harvester (1949), Slide, Donald, Slide (1949), Bee at the Beach (1950), Bee on Guard (1951) and Let's Stick Together (1952).

He later reappears in the Mickey Mouse Clubhouse episodes "Goofy's Bird", "Minnie's Bee Story" and "Mickey's Little Parade", the Mickey Mouse episodes "Bee Inspired" and "New Shoes", and the Legend of the Three Caballeros episode "Mount Rushmore (or Less)".

Spike also has a cameo appearance in the short film Once Upon a Studio (2023). In 2026 he was included in the video game Disney Magic Kingdoms as a playble character to unlock for a limited time.

=== Smorgasbord ===
Smorgasbord, also known as Smorgie the Bad, is an ogre. Described by his owner Witch Hazel as her "pet ogre", Smorgasbord is a large monster who can be summoned thanks to a special witch's brew by his mistress. He is a tall and hairy humanoid figure with a dog nose, horns, an eye on each side of the head and six arms in total; he can stretch those arms almost infinitely; his skin may be either orange or lime green.

Though he is quite beastly, Smorgasbord is nonetheless sentient (as demonstrated by the fact that he wears clothes, primitive jewelry and, most notably, a bowler hat) and can actually talk, though he rarely does. Smorgasbord is invulnerable to most mundane attacks, but the explosion of a stick of dynamite is nonetheless too much for him to handle; when faced with one, he will disappear and will only be back if one summons him all over again.

He was summoned on Halloween in 1952 by Witch Hazel to scare Donald Duck into giving away candy to trick-or-treaters Huey, Dewey and Louie Duck.

Smorgasbord first appeared in November 1952 in Carl Barks's comic-book version of Trick or Treat, although he was only featured in cut pages that were not restored to the story until 1978.

=== Tabby ===
Tabby is Donald's cat and he appeared for the first time in the story "The Health Nut" by Dick Kinney and Al Hubbard, where Fethry Duck also made his first appearance in comics. Tabby dislikes Fethry basically because he is full of crazy ideas that usually put Donald and him in trouble. This relation between Fethry and Tabby was quite explored in American and Brazilian comic stories starring Donald and Fethry. Tabby really likes his owner, Donald, but this does not refrain him from trying to catch a fish who lives in Donald's fishbowl. Like Poochie (Fethry Duck's dog) and Houn' Dawg (Hard Haid Moe's dog), Tabby is a pet whose thoughts are generally shown by comic writers, which is not the case of Bolivar (Donald Duck's dog), for example.

=== Yellow Beak ===
Yellow Beak is a green parrot with a wooden leg, wearing a red jacket and bandanna, a blue cape and a pirate hat. He was originally going to appear in the short film Morgan's Ghost which was set to feature Mickey Mouse, Donald, Goofy and Pete, but was cancelled. The first appearance of him goes back in the 01-page story Donald Duck Finds Pirate Gold (WDC #9) that was first published in October 1942, where he meets Donald, Huey, Dewey and Louie and they wind up searching for the lost treasure of Henry Morgan. He makes an appearance in the DuckTales reboot in the episode "The First Adventure!", as a deceased pirate who was the owner of the Papyrus of Binding.

=== Jenny the Burro ===
Jenny the Burro is a small female burro who first appeared in the short film Mickey's Polo Team (1936), being Donald Duck's polo mount. She reappeared in the short film Don Donald (1937), where Donald rides her to Donna Duck's house; when Donna rejects Donald, Jenny laughs at him, driving Donald to replace Jenny with a car. Jenny's last animated appearances were in the 1942 shorts The Village Smithy, where Donald tries to put a horseshoe on her without success, and Donald's Gold Mine, pulling Donald's cart through the mine.

A virtually identical, but explicitly male burro character named Basil featured as a steed and pet for Donald in the comics beginning in 1938. He has appeared in occasional new stories into modern times.

== Robots ==
=== Little Helper ===
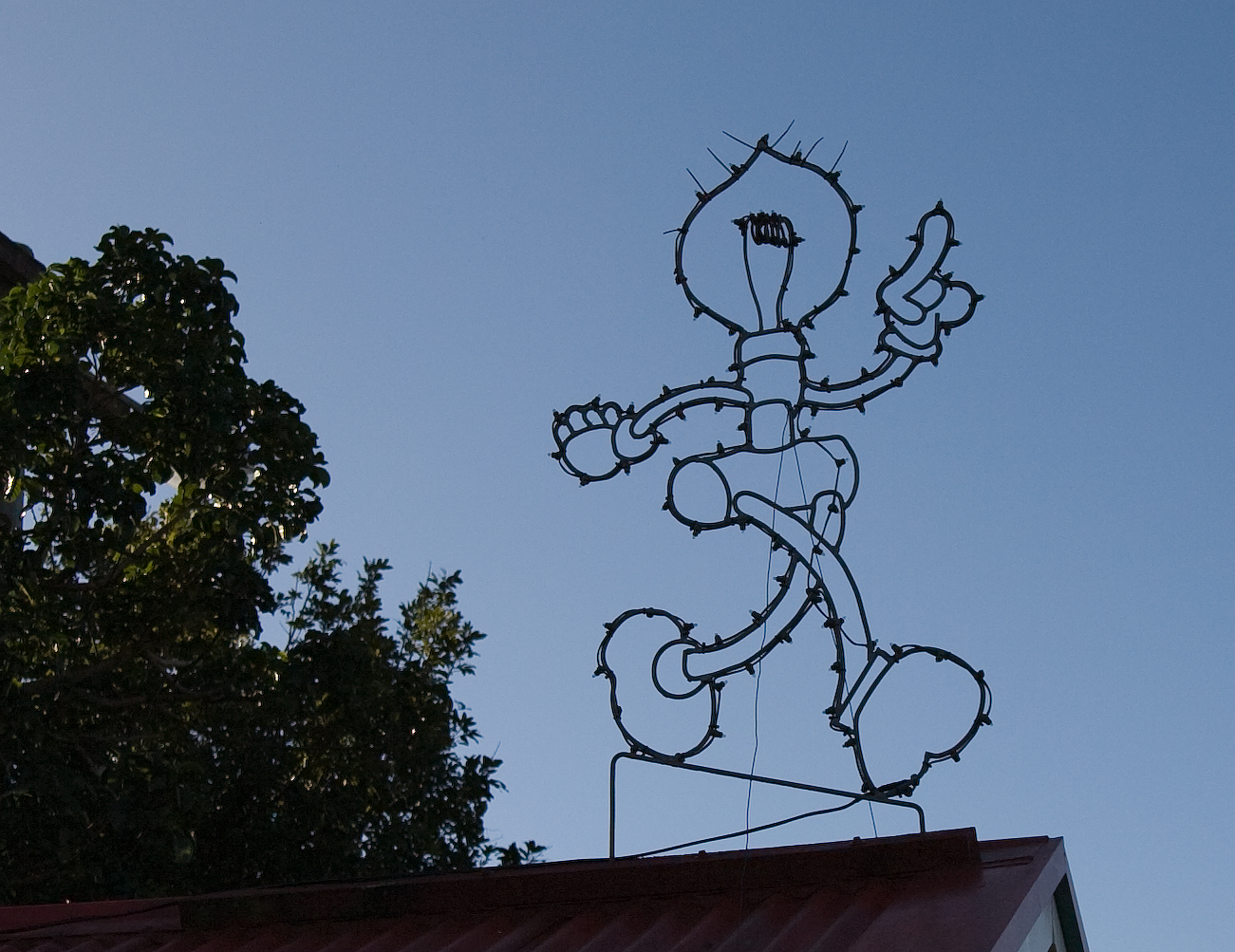
The companion of Gyro Gearloose

Little Helper, or simply Helper, debuted in the story "The Cat Box" in Uncle Scrooge #15 (September 1956), created by Carl Barks. Helper is a small, humanoid robot (about 20 cm tall), constructed from pieces of metal and a lightbulb, which serves as his head. He acts as the assistant to the inventor Gyro Gearloose. In the Donald Duck comics, he is often shown as an inventor himself, sometimes copying Gyro's inventions.

Little Helper never speaks, but occasionally uses thought bubbles. He is capable of buzzing, which he mostly uses to attract Gyro's attention. It is not clear whether Gyro can actually understand Helper's buzzing or whether he just acknowledges that Helper has something to show for him. Little Helper enjoys chasing mice and helping Gyro clean up the unusual consequences of his inventions.

Helper's origin is given in Don Rosa' story Gyro's First Invention (2002, first American publication in Uncle Scrooge #324, December 2003), created to celebrate Gyro's 50th anniversary. In this flashback story, Gyro accidentally passed on some of his intelligence to Donald Duck's desk lamp. Gyro added small metal arms and legs to the lamp, so that it could move about as a small robot. Little Helper lived up to his name, helping his creator with his inventions.

In many of Barks' original scripts and notes, he is sometimes named Little Bulbhead ("Bulby" for short), a name that was never given in the comics. In the Italian comics, his name is Edi, in reference to Thomas Edison.

Little Helper appears alongside Gyro in the animated series DuckTales. He is called Little Bulb in the series, a name seemingly adapted from Barks' notes, which is compatible with the Brazilian name for the character — Lampadinha — informal diminutive of Lâmpada (lamp), in Portuguese. Also in Dutch, he is called "Lampje" (little lamp) and Filament in French. He also appears by the same name in the reboot series, in which he is depicted as a fairly hostile robot with a tendency towards violence.

An unrelated robot with the same name and purpose appears in the Disney Jr. show Mickey Mouse Clubhouse+.

== Historical figures ==
In several Don Rosa stories, Scrooge McDuck encountered historical people. The most notable of these encounters was with U.S. president Theodore Roosevelt. Roosevelt and Scrooge would meet each other at least three times: in the Dakotas in 1883, in Duckburg in 1902, and in Panama in 1906. Rosa is famous for his historical accuracy: he checks historical records to make sure that the figures he writes about could have plausibly taken part in those adventures. (This also extends to scientific accuracy for the most part.) Other historical people who met Scrooge:

- Elias Lönnrot, in Glasgow in 1877.
- Jesse James, several times in the late 19th century.
- Murdo McKenzie, in Montana from 1882 to 1884.
- Sultan Mangkunagara V of Djokja, in Batavia in 1883.

(Which was actually an error since the ruler of Djokja at the time was Sultan Hamengkubuwono VII. The error was derived from the mistake on Don Rosa's source, an 1890s traveling story titled On The Subject of Java)

- Sultan Pakubuwana IX of Solo, in Batavia in 1883.
- Marcus Daly, in Butte, Montana in 1884.
- Jakob Waltz in Pizen Bluff in 1890.
- Geronimo, in Arizona in 1890.
- Buffalo Bill, in Arizona in 1890.
- Annie Oakley, in Arizona in 1890.
- P. T. Barnum, in Arizona in 1890.
- The Dalton Brothers, in Arizona in 1890.
- Adolf Erik Nordenskiöld, at the Chicago Universal Exposition in 1892 (or 1893).
- Wyatt Earp, in Skagway in 1896 and one year later in White Agony Creek.
- Bat Masterson, in White Agony Creek in 1897.
- Judge Roy Bean, in White Agony Creek in 1897.
- Butch Cassidy, in White Agony Creek in 1897.
- The Sundance Kid, in White Agony Creek in 1897.
- Sam Steele, in Dawson City in 1898.
- Jack London, in Dawson City in 1898.
- Edith Roosevelt, in Panama in 1906.
- John F. Stevens, in Panama in 1906.
- Robert Peary, close to the North Pole in 1909.
- Matthew Henson, near the North Pole in 1909.
- Nicholas II of Russia, in the Winter Palace in 1910.
- John Jacob Astor IV, on the RMS Titanic in 1912
- Sitting Bull, he was called "Standing Bull" until he lost a fight against Scrooge.

Furthermore, Don Rosa often hides images of himself, his friends or Carl Barks in his stories.

== See also ==
- Mickey Mouse universe
- List of DuckTales characters
- List of Darkwing Duck characters
