= Gyro Gearloose =

Disney comics character

- Donald Duck character
- First appearance: "Gladstone's Terrible Secret" in Walt Disney's Comics and Stories #140 (May 1952)
- Created by: Carl Barks
- Voiced by: Will Ryan (Sport Goofy in Soccermania); Hal Smith (DuckTales); Frank Welker (Donald Duck: Goin' Quackers); Chris Edgerly (DuckTales: Remastered); Jim Rash (DuckTales reboot)
- Aliases: Dr. Gearloose, Professor Gearloose
- Species: Chicken
- Gender: Male
- Significant other: Matilda (girlfriend)
- Relatives: Fulton Gearloose (father); Sonia Pardalto (mother); Ratchet Gearloose (grandfather); Martha Bird (grandmother); Copernico Gearloose (great-grandfather); Anastasia Anatryn (great-grandmother); Cartesio Gearloose (great-granduncle); Newton Gearloose (nephew)

Gyro Gearloose (/ˈdʒaɪroʊ ˈɡɪərluːs/ JY-roh GHEER-looss) is a cartoon character created in 1952 by Carl Barks for Disney comics. An anthropomorphic chicken, he is part of the Donald Duck universe, appearing in comic book stories as a friend of Donald Duck, Scrooge McDuck, and anyone who is associated with them. He was also featured in the animated series DuckTales. Gyro first appeared in the Carl Barks comic "Gladstone's Terrible Secret" (Walt Disney's Comics and Stories #140, May 1952), and was the regular lead character in 4-page backup stories in Barks' issues of Uncle Scrooge, starting with issue #13 (March 1956) and continuing through #41 (March 1963).

== Biography ==
Gyro is Duckburg's ingenious inventor, even though his inventions sometimes do not work the way he wants them to. His outrageous productivity is presented as a factor in the quality of his inventions. Because Gyro is always coming up with new ideas, the fact that his inventions often lack an important feature will often cause trouble for both Scrooge and Donald, who are known to have frequently bought his inventions. He is known for being good-natured towards others. Gyro is often assisted by his Little Helper (or just "Helper"), who is a small anthropomorphic robot with a light bulb for a head. Besides Little Helper, he also has a "thinking cap", a hat shaped like a combination of a rooftop and a nest, with three black birds living inside it. Wearing this thinking cap helps Gyro figure out particularly difficult problems, but it only works if the birds are currently nesting in the cap. Some stories have involved the birds leaving Gyro's thinking cap, resulting in the cap becoming ineffective.

Some of Gyro's relatives include his father Fulton Gearloose, his grandfather Ratchet Gearloose, and Newton Gearloose, his nephew. Occasionally there have been stories about Gyro's girlfriend Matilda. In some stories, Gyro's primary rival is Emil Eagle, although he is also antagonized by the Beagle Boys and Magica De Spell. With his inventions, he is also a very important ally of Donald Duck's alter ego, Paperinik, in the Italian Disney comics. Consistent with the two "G's" in his name, he had bins on his shelves containing odds and ends, which he labeled "Gewgaws", "Gimcracks", "Gadgets", and "Gizmos".

== Appearances in other media ==
Gyro made his first animated appearance in a 1980s full-length movie, the Sport Goofy in Soccermania television special, with only one line of dialogue, voiced by Will Ryan: "Scrooge parting with a million dollars?" In the subsequent 1987 animated series DuckTales, Gyro became a regular character, with Hal Smith supplying his voice while Barry Gordon records it in several episodes. Among Gyro's noteworthy inventions in the series was the creation of the GizmoDuck suit, intended to be worn by a security guard for Scrooge McDuck's Money Bin. Although Gyro's shop and house are on the south side of Duckburg, he was born on the north side; a sign marks his birthplace and mentions one of his inventions: topless hats.

In high school, young Gyro was a baseball pitcher with his "madball" pitch — actually only a straight-ball pitch. When Gyro is forced to pitch for the Northside, pitting an "unhittable" baseball against another of his inventions, an "unmissable" baseball bat made for the Southside team, the result is total chaos.

Gyro is a classic example of an eccentric genius. Once he persuaded the citizens of Duckburg to rebuild their metropolis into a climate-controlled "City of the Future". Unfortunately for Gyro, his idea worked too well. Donald Duck worked only 1 hour a day and spent 23 hours sleeping, which left him more grouchy than normal, while Uncle Scrooge's robot made him so much money that it filled up his money bin to the point where he could not even burrow into it. The final straw came when Gyro's Robot Helper makes a robot to replace Gyro as an inventor. Realizing Duckburg is not ready for the future, Gyro returns the city back to its old self.

Contrary to his entry in Don Markstein's Toonopedia, Gyro never appeared on House of Mouse. Gyro, in his usual role as an inventor, is replaced with Ludwig Von Drake in House of Mouse and many other cartoons.

In the Toontown universe, Gyro created a robot that, when Scrooge accidentally wired it incorrectly, made the Cogs, the main antagonists of the game. They were grim businessmen-like robots who could not take a joke. So, to take care of the infestation, the Toons (the main protagonists of the game) destroyed them with gags such as squirting seltzer water and throwing pies at them.

A reimagined Gyro appears in the 2017 reboot of DuckTales (voiced by Jim Rash), in which he maintains a lab below Scrooge's Money Bin. This Gyro merges characteristics of his harsher, early comic book self with those of his original DuckTales counterpart along with adlibbing by Rash; the result being an eccentric who struggles with social graces and has a short temper, yet still retains a good nature and makes efforts to stop his inventions from harming people. He also has a track record of inventions gaining sentience and becoming evil, though he argues that some of them are merely misunderstood (a trait that the show creators have also attributed to Gyro himself). In his debut episode, "The Great Dime Chase!", he unveils Little Bulb (this show's version of Little Helper), who goes out of control under Louie's supervision (though Gyro manages to fix the problem by replacing his invention's head with a lower-watt bulb). He later begins brainstorming the creation of the Gizmoduck suit under the codename "Project Blatherskite". In season one's subsequent episodes, he took on Fenton Crackshell-Cabrera as an intern, clashed with Scrooge's rival Mark Beaks, and forced Donald Duck to swallow a voice modulator. In the season 2 premiere, he uses a modified shrink ray invention to communicate with a microscopic civilizations in the McDuck household, only to be taken hostage when he attempted to become their god-king. Later in season 2, his oxy-chew gum (used by Della and Donald Duck to survive on the moon), Time Teaser (used by Flintheart Glomgold in a scheme against Scrooge McDuck), and Time Tub (used by Gyro himself to travel back to the Old West and by Louie as part of a get-rich-quick scheme) make appearances. In the season 2 finale, he developed a clone spray that he used on himself and produced a small army of Little Bulbs with walkie-talkie functions. In season three, Gyro's past is explored further. Decades prior to the series, he worked as an optimistic young intern under roboticist, Dr. Akita. Gyro built a child-like defense drone named 2-BO and treated him like a real boy, but Akita tampered with his programming before using him to terrorize the city of Tokyolk. Having lost his creation, Gyro became embittered and repressed his memories of the android. When Huey brought 2-BO, now B.O.Y.D., to him to be fixed, Gyro was forced to return to Tokyolk and confront his past as well as Akita. Once he learned what happened and defeated his former mentor, Gyro reconciled with B.O.Y.D.

== Gearloose family members ==
=== Ratchet Gearloose ===
Ratchet Gearloose is Gyro's paternal grandfather, created by Carl Barks. He knew Scrooge McDuck: he first met him during his Mississippi riverboat days. They later met on the island of Krakatoa. Nothing was known about Ratchet since then but it is assumed that he wound up in Duckburg since his son Fulton Gearloose is one of the first three Junior Woodchucks.

=== Fulton Gearloose ===
Fulton Gearloose is the son of Ratchet Gearloose and the father of Gyro Gearloose. Created by Don Rosa, he was first mentioned in Guardians of The Library in Uncle Scrooge Adventures #27 as the inventor of The Junior Woodchucks Merit Badge, as well as the first person it was awarded to (for inventing it). He first appeared in person in The Life and Times of Scrooge McDuck Part 10 as a young child and one of the first three Junior Woodchucks. He appears as an elderly man in the story Gyro's First Invention.

=== Newton Gearloose ===
Newton Gearloose is Gyro's nephew. He first appeared in 1960 in the Gyro Gearloose story titled 'Ting-A-Ling Trouble', written by Vic Lockman and drawn by Phil DeLara, in Walt Disney's Comics and Stories #308. Newton was a fan of his uncle's work and wanted to be an inventor like him when he grew up. Newton is also a Junior Woodchuck, as well as a friend of Huey, Dewey, and Louie. Newton went by the nickname "Giggy". After the early 1970s, Newton ceased appearing in new North American Disney comics. He continued to be used in some Brazilian and Danish-produced Disney comics into the 1990s, while he still appears in Dutch and Italian-produced comics. There was a similar character in the DuckTales episode "Superdoo". Like Newton, he was also in the Junior Woodchucks. Though his name is never spoken, he does bear a physical resemblance to Newton Gearloose.

=== Other relatives ===
Italian Disney comics, which have not been translated into English, and the Gearloose family tree drawn by Marco Gervasio, have introduced other members of Gyro's family, such as his mother Sonia, his grandmother Martha Bird, his great-grandfather Copernico and great-great-uncle Cartesio.

== Names ==
Outside the English-speaking world, Gyro Gearloose has the following names:

- Arabic world: عبقرينو Abqarino
- Argentina: Pardal, Giro Sintornillos ("Turn Screwdrivers")
- Brazil and Portugal: Prof. Pardal ("Professor Sparrow")
- Bulgaria: Жиро Конструиро ("Gyro Construct"). In comics - Хари Хлопдъск ("Harry Barmy").
- Latin America: Giro Sintornillos ("Giro Screwless"), also known as Ciro Peraloca in certain regions.
- China: 吉罗 Jíluó
- Croatia: Izumitelj ("Inventor") Mudrić
- Czech: Šikula ("a skillful person")
- Denmark: Georg Gearløs
- Estonia: Leidur Leo ("Inventor Leo")
- Finland: Pelle Peloton ("Pelle Fearless")
- France: Géo Trouvetou(t), Gyro Sanfrein ("Geo finds-everything", "Gyro Without-brakes")
- Germany: Daniel Düsentrieb ("Daniel Jet Propulsion")
- Greece: Κύρος Γρανάζης ("Cyrus Gear")
- Hungary: Szaki Dani/Lökhajtay Dániel
- Iceland: Georg Gírlausi
- Indonesia: Lang Ling Lung
- Italy: Archimede Pitagorico (Archimedes Pythagorean)
- Japan: ジャイロ・ギアルース ("Jairo Giarūsu")
- Korea: 자이로 기어루스 ("Jailo Gieoluseu")
- Latvia: Bruno Bezbremze ("Bruno Without Brake")
- Lithuania: Sriegas Bevaržtis ("Thread Screwless")
- Mexico: Ciro Peraloca ("Ciro Punching Ball"/"Ciro Crazy Pear")
- Norway: Petter Smart (additionally the name Goggen Skrueløs, i.e. "Georgie Screwless", was briefly used in early Norwegian translations)
- Netherlands: Willie Wortel ("Will Square Root" / "Will Carrot")
- Peru: Ciro Peraloca
- Poland: Diodak ("Diode Chicken")
- Russia: Винт Разболтайло ("Screw Worked-loose")
- Serbia: Прока Проналазач
- Slovakia: Gyro Vynálezca
- Slovenia: Professor Umnik ("Professor Smart")
- Spain: Ungenio Tarconi (Pun with "Eugenio", a common name, and "A Genius")
- Sweden: Oppfinnar-Jocke ("Inventor-Jocke")
- Turkey: Sivrizekâ
- Uzbekistan: Ixtirochi Vint ("Screw Worked-loose")
- Ukraine: Гвинт Недокрут ("Screw Under-twisted")
- Vietnam: Giáo sư - tiến sĩ Gyro Gearloose
