= The Golden Helmet =

- Original comic book cover by Carl Barks
- Story code: W OS 408-02
- Story: Carl Barks
- Ink: Carl Barks
- Date: July 1952
- Pages: 32
- Layout: 4 rows per page
- Appearances: Donald Duck; Huey, Dewey and Louie

"The Golden Helmet" is a 32-page Disney comics adventure story written, drawn, and lettered by Carl Barks. The story was first published in Four Color #408 (July 1952) with a cover by Barks. In the story, Donald Duck and his nephews hunt for a Viking helmet that gives the possessor legal claim to North America.

== Plot ==
Donald is working as a guard at the Duckburg Museum, but finds his duties unsatisfying. The relics of the glorious past in the halls of the museum are all but forgotten, as the crowds are more interested in the butterfly, lace, and tatting collections. Donald laments his luck for being stuck there, while he thirsts for an adventure like the Vikings.

Donald's wish is soon answered when he becomes involved in a relic hunt of great importance. According to an old Viking saga and a map discovered in the museum, Olaf the Blue, a Viking explorer, had reached the coast of North America in the early 10th century and had claimed this land as his property — a claim that was indeed valid according to an international treaty drafted in 792 during the reign of Charlemagne. Accompanied by an attorney named Sharky, Azure Blue, a man who claims to be Olaf's distant descendant, sets out to find the evidence that his ancestor left behind as proof of his claim — a Golden Helmet, whose possessor will be the owner of North America.

The museum's director enlists Donald and his nephews in a rival attempt to find the helmet first. Its location is estimated to be somewhere on the coast of Labrador, Canada. During their search, both rival expeditions lose all modern equipment, and by the time they find the helmet they must try to reach Labrador's coast traveling like the Vikings did. This is the least of their problems as the helmet changes hands between Azure Blue, the museum's director, Donald, and Lawyer Sharky.

The helmet, an object of power, has the same effect on each of its successive owners: A cold glitter in their eyes betrays awakening greed and ambitions, as they become more ruthless, each of them in turn revealing the dreams of a would-be tyrant. Donald goes so far as to suggest charging for oxygen, with people wearing meters on their chests to keep track of how much they breathe. The idealistic museum director isn't interested in personal wealth, but changing North American culture and education to his own ideals, to the "benefit" of society.

Finally, Donald's nephews manage to throw the helmet into the sea and end the madness, but not before Louie gets the same glitter in his eyes. Back at the museum after the adventure, Donald is again working as a guard, after all he decides to get acquainted with contemporary times and interest himself of the current exhibits that appeal to the masses.

== Writing ==
In a 1972 interview, Barks recalled, "The work date on the story, November of 1951, indicates that it was done at a time when my fortunes were at a very low ebb. I had just given everything I owned to my alcoholic wife in exchange for my freedom. Broke and in debt and facing years of stiff alimony at the age of 50 I chose to keep working, and I can recall one day when all the bad news struck me and I should have been heading for a bar, and instead I sat there like a zombie with a pad of paper and jotted down gags and plots and situations that seemed to pour into me from somewhere. 'The Golden Helmet' must have been one of those situations." He also said that the story idea itself was inspired by the coastal scenes in Hal Foster's comic strip Prince Valiant.

== Analysis ==
Usually considered as one of Barks' strongest stories, its strength lies in its characterization, as each of the characters exhibits the darkest sides of his personality. The "heroes" prove to be no better than the "villains" when the opportunity arises and the only solution seems to be the loss of the helmet. The helmet has a similar effect on those who possess it to J. R. R. Tolkien's One Ring or Der Ring des Nibelungen, where the reason also lies in one's mind rather than any magical curse. Barks' successors have added a number of sequels. It seems to have inspired a further exploration of the Ducks' motivation and the darker sides of their psyches in subsequent stories.

Rich Kreiner writes, "'The Golden Helmet' is a veritable symphony of the themes and elements that fired Carl Barks' imagination throughout his career. As a rip-roaring adventure, it's a quest for an object of great value and power involving a race over treacherous territory to an exotic, unforgiving locale." Kreiner also praises "the dynamic rhythm sustained throughout the epic. Each scene is fully fleshed out, every break neatly timed. Tension never slackens as the discrete parts of the lively tale are kept in smooth working order. It is high praise to say a comic book story has no throwaway panels, but this yarn illustrates that concept. Every picture tells a story."

== Relevance to Danish culture ==
In January 2006, the Danish Ministry of Culture published a canon of works significant to Danish culture. This story — the only item in the children's category of the canon not of Danish origin — was included on the list of children's culture items, alongside LEGO building blocks.

== Sequels ==
In 1989, two Danish teenagers, Jesper Lund Madsen and Theis Christiansen won a competition in the Danish Anders And (Donald Duck) magazine, with a comic produced completely by themselves, "På gensyn med den gyldne hjelm" (The Golden Helmet Revisited). The comic was produced as a bonus magazine for the October 16, 1989 issue of the magazine. Madsen later went on to work professionally for the magazine.

In 1995, Don Rosa wrote a sequel to "The Golden Helmet", called "The Lost Charts of Columbus".

Azure Blue also appears in a cameo in Rosa's story "Return to Plain Awful", as one of several villainous characters trying to follow Scrooge McDuck to the Andes to search for square eggs.

Another sequel was written and drawn in 2002 by Massimo De Vita, called "Topolino e l'imperatore d'America" (Mickey Mouse and the Emperor of America). This is notable for being one of the rare Italian Duck/Mouse crossovers as well as one of the few cases of De Vita drawing Duck universe characters after 1996. It was also not published on Topolino but in a specifically Barks-themed release, which was also released in Germany.

== See also ==
- List of Disney comics by Carl Barks
