= List of Uncle Scrooge comics =

This is a complete list of issues in the Uncle Scrooge series of comic books, grouped by publisher and sorted in chronological order after the date of publication.

== List ==
=== Dell Comics (1952–1962) ===
Issue	Date	Stories (Writing / Art)	Notes
1	March 1952	"Only a Poor Old Man" (Barks / Barks)	Published as Four Color #386
2	March 1953	"Back to the Klondike" (Barks / Barks)	Published as Four Color #456
3	September 1953	"The Horseradish Story" (Barks / Barks)	Published as Four Color #495
4	December 1953	"The Menehune Mystery" (Barks / Barks)	
5	March 1954	"The Secret of Atlantis (Barks / Barks)	
6	June 1954	"Tralla La" (Barks / Barks)	
7	September 1954	"The Seven Cities of Cibola" (Barks / Barks)	
8	December 1954	"The Mysterious Stone Ray" (Barks / Barks)	
9	March 1955	"The Lemming with the Locket" (Barks / Barks)	
10	June 1955	"The Fabulous Philosopher's Stone (Barks / Barks)	
11	September 1955	"The Great Steamboat Race" (Barks / Barks) "Riches, Riches, Everywhere!" (Barks / Barks)	
12	December 1955	"The Golden Fleecing" (Barks / Barks)	
13	March 1956	"Land Beneath the Ground!" (Barks / Barks)	
14	June 1956	"The Lost Crown of Genghis Khan!" (Barks / Barks)	
15	September 1956	"The Second-Richest Duck" (Barks / Barks)	
16	December 1956	"Back To Long Ago!" (Barks / Barks)	
17	March 1957	"A Cold Bargain" (Barks / Barks)	
18	June 1957	"Land of the Pygmy Indians" (Barks / Barks)	
19	September 1957	"The Mines of King Solomon" (Barks / Barks)	
20	December 1957	"City of Golden Roofs" (Barks / Barks)	
21	March 1958	"The Money Well" (Barks / Barks)	
22	June 1958	"The Golden River" (Barks / Barks)	
23	September 1958	"The Strange Shipwrecks" (Barks, George / Barks)	
24	December 1958	"The Twenty-four Carat Moon" (Barks / Barks)	
25	March 1959	"The Flying Dutchman" (Barks / Barks)	
26	June 1959	"The Prize of Pizarro" (Barks / Barks)	
27	September 1959	"The Money Champ" (Barks / Barks)	
28	December 1959	"The Paul Bunyan Machine" (Barks / Barks)	
29	March 1960	"Island in the Sky" (Barks / Barks)	
30	June 1960	"Pipeline to Danger" (Barks / Barks)	
31	September 1960	"All At Sea" (Barks / Barks)	
32	December 1960	"That's No Fable!" (Barks / Barks)	
33	March 1961	"Billions in the Hole" (Barks / Barks)	
34	June 1961	"Mythtic Mystery" (Barks / Barks)	
35	September 1961	"The Golden Nugget Boat" (Barks / Barks)	
36	December 1961	"The Midas Touch" (Barks / Barks)	
37	March 1962	"Cave of Ali Baba" (Barks / Barks)	
38	June 1962	"The Unsafe Safe" (Barks / Barks)	
39	September 1962	"A Spicy Tale" (Barks / Barks)	

=== Gold Key Comics (1963–1980) ===
Issue	Date	Stories (Writing / Art)	Notes
40	January 1963	"Oddball Odyssey" (Barks / Barks)	
41	March 1963	"The Status Seeker" (Barks / Barks)	
42	May 1963	"The Case of the Sticky Money" (Barks / Barks)	
43	July 1963	"For Old Dime's Sake" (Barks / Barks)	
44	August 1963	"Crown of the Mayas" (Barks / Barks)	
45	October 1963	"Isle of Golden Geese" (Barks / Barks)	
46	December 1963	"Lost Beneath the Sea" (Barks / Barks)	
47	February 1964	"The Thrifty Spendthrift" (Barks / Barks)	
48	March 1964	"The Many Faces of Magica de Spell" (Barks / Barks)	
49	May 1964	"The Loony Lunar Gold Rush" (Barks / Barks)	
50	July 1964	"Rug Riders in the Sky" (Barks / Barks)	
51	August 1964	"How Green was my Lettuce" (Barks / Barks)	
52	September 1964	"The Great Wig Mystery" (Barks / Barks)	
53	October 1964	"Interplanetary Postman" (Barks / Barks)	
54	December 1964	"The Billion Dollar Safari" (Barks / Barks)	
55	February 1965	"McDuck of Arabia" (Barks / Barks)	
56	March 1965	"Mystery of the Ghost Town Railroad" (Barks / Barks)	
57	May 1965	"The Swamp of No Return" (Barks / Barks)	
58	July 1965	"The Giant Robot Robbers" (Barks / Barks)	
59	September 1965	"North of the Yukon" (Barks / Barks)	
60	November 1965	"The Phantom of Notre Duck" (Barks / Barks)	
61	January 1966	"So Far and No Safari" (Barks / Barks)	
62	March 1966	"The Queen of the Wild Dog Pack" (Barks / Barks)	
63	May 1966	"House of Haunts" (Barks / Barks)	
64	July 1966	"Treasure of Marco Polo" (Barks / Barks)	
65	September 1966	"Micro-Ducks from Outer Space" (Barks / Barks)	
66	November 1966	"The Heedless Horseman" (Barks / Barks)	
67	January 1967	"The Fabulous Philosopher's Stone" (Barks / Barks)	Reprinted from #10
68	March 1967	"Hall of the Mermaid Queen" (Barks / Barks)	
69	May 1967	"The Cattle King" (Barks / Barks)	
70	July 1967	"The Doom Diamond" (Barks / Barks)	
71	October 1967	"King Scrooge the First" (Barks / Strobl, Steere)	
72	December 1967	"The Great Steamboat Race" (Barks / Barks)	Reprinted from #11
73	February 1968	"Bongo on the Congo" (Barks / Barks)	Reprinted from #33
74	April 1968	"The Dragon's Amulet" (Lockman / Strobl, Steere)	
75	June 1968	"The Battle of Marathon" (Lockman / Strobl, Steere)	
76	August 1968	"Bye-Bye, Money Bin" (Lockman / Strobl, Steere)	
77	October 1968	"The Jillion-Dollar Diamond" (Lockman / Strobl, Steere)	
78	December 1968	"I. O. U. ... But Who?" (Lockman / Strobl, Steere) "The Fickle Fortune-Finder" (Lockman / Strobl, Steere)	
79	February 1969	"The Strange Case of the Watched Duck" (Lockman / Strobl, Steere)	
80	April 1969	"Rikki Tikki Uprising" (Fallberg / Strobl, Steere)	
81	June 1969	"Moon-Struck" (Lockman / Strobl, Steere)	
82	August 1969	"Mythtic Mystery" (Barks / Barks)	Reprinted from #34
83	October 1969	"The Monster and the Money Tree" (Lockman / Strobl, Steere)	
84	December 1969	"The Lost Crown of Genghis Khan!" (Barks / Barks)	Reprinted from #14
85	February 1970	"The Great Wig Mystery" (Barks / Barks)	Reprinted from #52
86	April 1970	"The Golden Nugget Boat" (Barks / Barks)	Reprinted from #35
87	June 1970	"The Flying Dutchman" (Barks / Barks)	Reprinted from #25
88	August 1970	"The Unsafe Safe" (Barks / Barks)	Reprinted from #38
89	October 1970	"The Second-Richest Duck" (Barks / Barks)	Reprinted from #15
90	December 1970	"Cave of Ali Baba" (Barks / Barks)	Reprinted from #37
91	February 1971	"Riches, Riches, Everywhere!" (Barks / Barks)	Reprinted from #11
92	April 1971	"The Magic Ink" (Barks / Barks) "Two-Way Luck" (Barks / Barks)	Reprinted from #24; Reprinted from #31
93	June 1971	"The Midas Touch" (Barks / Barks)	Reprinted from #36
94	August 1971	"Interplanetary Postman" (Barks / Barks)	Reprinted from #53
95	October 1971	"How Green was my Lettuce" (Barks / Barks)	Reprinted from #51
96	December 1971	"The Thrifty Spendthrift" (Barks / Barks)	Reprinted from #47
97	February 1972	"That's No Fable!" (Barks / Barks)	Reprinted from #32
98	April 1972	"The Status Seeker" (Barks / Barks)	Reprinted from #41
99	June 1972	"The Case of the Sticky Money" (Barks / Barks)	Reprinted from #42
100	August 1972	"Pipeline to Danger" (Barks / Barks)	Reprinted from #30
101	September 1972	"Wispy Willie" (Barks / Barks) "Old Demon Tooth" (Barks / Barks)	Reprinted from Walt Disney's Comics and Stories #159; Reprinted from Walt Disney's Comics and Stories #157
102	November 1972	"A Spicy Tale" (Barks / Barks)	Reprinted from #39
103	February 1973	"Back To Long Ago!" (Barks / Barks)	Reprinted from #16
104	April 1973	"The Lemming with the Locket" (Barks / Barks)	Reprinted from #9
105	June 1973	"The Horseradish Story" (Barks / Barks)	Reprinted from #3
106	August 1973	"Tralla La" (Barks / Barks)	Reprinted from #6
107	September 1973	"The Money Well" (Barks / Barks)	Reprinted from #21
108	October 1973	"The Mines of King Solomon" (Barks / Barks)	Reprinted from #19
109	December 1973	"Land Beneath the Ground!" (Barks / Barks)	Reprinted from #13
110	February 1974	"The Golden River" (Barks / Barks)	Reprinted from #22
111	April 1974	"The Mysterious Unfinished Invention" (Barks / Barks)	Reprinted from #8
112	June 1974	"Land of the Pygmy Indians" (Barks / Barks)	Reprinted from #18
113	August 1974	"Crown of the Mayas" (Barks / Barks)	Reprinted from #44
114	September 1974	"The Phantom of Notre Duck" (Barks / Barks)	Reprinted from #60
115	October 1974	"The Giant Robot Robbers" (Barks / Barks)	Reprinted from #58
116	December 1974	"Rug Riders in the Sky" (Barks / Barks)	Reprinted from #50
117	February 1975	"The Loony Lunar Gold Rush" (Barks / Barks)	Reprinted from #49
118	April 1975	"The Billion Dollar Safari" (Barks / Barks)	Reprinted from #54
119	June 1975	"The Strange Shipwrecks" (Barks, George / Barks)	Reprinted from #23
120	July 1975	"Billions in the Hole" (Barks / Barks)	Reprinted from #33
121	August 1975	"McDuck of Arabia" (Barks / Barks)	Reprinted from #55
122	September 1975	"Mystery of the Ghost Town Railroad" (Barks / Barks)	Reprinted from #56
123	October 1975	"The Swamp of No Return" (Barks / Barks)	Reprinted from #57
124	December 1975	"North of the Yukon" (Barks / Barks)	Reprinted from #59
125	January 1976	"Hall of the Mermaid Queen" (Barks / Barks)	Reprinted from #68
126	March 1976	"The Cattle King" (Barks / Barks)	Reprinted from #69
127	April 1976	"So Far and No Safari" (Barks / Barks)	Reprinted from #61
128	May 1976	"The Queen of the Wild Dog Pack" (Barks / Barks)	Reprinted from #62
129	June 1976	"House of Haunts" (Barks / Barks)	Reprinted from #63
130	July 1976	"Micro-Ducks from Outer Space" (Barks / Barks)	Reprinted from #65
131	August 1976	"The Heedless Horseman" (Barks / Barks)	Reprinted from #66
132	September 1976	"The Fabulous Philosopher's Stone (Barks / Barks)	Reprinted from #10
133	October 1976	"The Doom Diamond" (Barks / Barks)	Reprinted from #70
134	November 1976	"Treasure of Marco Polo" (Barks / Barks)	Reprinted from #64
135	December 1976	"The Twenty-four Carat Moon" (Barks / Barks)	Reprinted from #24
136	January 1977	"Deep Down Doings" (Barks / Barks)	Reprinted from #37
137	February 1977	"All At Sea" (Barks / Barks)	Reprinted from #31
138	March 1977	"The Many Faces of Magica de Spell" (Barks / Barks)	Reprinted from #48
139	April 1977	"Isle of Golden Geese" (Barks / Barks)	Reprinted from #45
140	May 1977	"For Old Dime's Sake" (Barks / Barks)	Reprinted from #43
141	June 1977	"The Case of the Sticky Money" (Barks / Barks)	Reprinted from #42
142	July 1977	"Back to the Klondike" (Barks / Barks)	Reprinted from #2
143	August 1977	"Island in the Sky" (Barks / Barks)	Reprinted from #29
144	September 1977	"The Paul Bunyan Machine" (Barks / Barks)	Reprinted from #28
145	October 1977	"King Scrooge the First" (Barks / Strobl, Steere)	Reprinted from #71
146	November 1977	"Pipeline to Danger" (Barks / Barks)	Reprinted from #30
147	December 1977	"Mythtic Mystery" (Barks / Barks)	Reprinted from #34
148	January 1978	"Riches, Riches, Everywhere!" (Barks / Barks)	Reprinted from #11
149	February 1978	"Lost Beneath the Sea" (Barks / Barks)	Reprinted from #46
150	March 1978	"The Money Champ" (Barks / Barks)	Reprinted from #27
151	April 1978	"The Flying Dutchman" (Barks / Barks)	Reprinted from #25
152	May 1978	"The Great Wig Mystery" (Barks / Barks)	Reprinted from #52
153	June 1978	"A Case of Too Many Sea Monsters" (Fallberg / Strobl, Liggera)	Reprinted from #49
154	July 1978	"Interplanetary Postman" (Barks / Barks)	Reprinted from #53
155	August 1978	"The Great Steamboat Race" (Barks / Barks)	Reprinted from #11
156	September 1978	"The Unsafe Safe" (Barks / Barks)	Reprinted from #38
157	October 1978	"The Costly Cat" (Lockman / Strobl) "Two-Way Luck" (Barks / Barks)	Reprinted from #53; Reprinted from #31
158	November 1978	"The Jillion-Dollar Diamond" (Lockman / Strobl, Steere)	Reprinted from #77
159	December 1978	"The Golden Nugget Boat" (Barks / Barks)	Reprinted from #35
160	January 1979	"The Second-Richest Duck" (Barks / Barks)	Reprinted from #15
161	February 1979	"The Lost Crown of Genghis Khan!" (Barks / Barks)	Reprinted from #14
162	March 1979	"Moon-Struck" (Lockman / Strobl, Steere)	Reprinted from #81
163	April 1979	"Rikki Tikki Uprising" (Fallberg / Strobl, Steere)	Reprinted from #80
164	May 1979	"The Monster and the Money Tree" (Lockman / Strobl, Steere)	Reprinted from #83
165	June 1979	"Heirloom Watch" (Barks / Barks) "Hound of the Whiskervilles" (Barks / Barks)	Reprinted from #10; Reprinted from #29
166	July 1979	"The Dragon's Amulet" (Lockman / Strobl, Steere)	Reprinted from #74
167	August 1979	"Bye-Bye, Money Bin" (Lockman / Strobl, Steere)	Reprinted from #76
168	September 1979	"The Strange Case of the Watched Duck" (Lockman / Strobl, Steere)	Reprinted from #79
169	October 1979	"The Battle of Marathon" (Lockman / Strobl, Steere)	Reprinted from #75
170	November 1979	"I. O. U. ... But Who?" (Lockman / Strobl, Steere) "The Fickle Fortune-Finder" (Lockman / Strobl, Steere)	Reprinted from #78
171	December 1979	"Riches, Riches, Everywhere!" (Barks / Barks)	Reprinted from #11
172	January 1980	"The Round Money Bin" (Barks / Barks)	Reprinted from #3
173	February 1980	"How Green was my Lettuce" (Barks / Barks)	Reprinted from #51

=== Whitman Publishing (1980–1984) ===
Issue	Date	Stories (Writing / Art)	Notes
174	March 1980	"The Status Seeker" (Barks / Barks)	Reprinted from #41
175	April 1980	"Wispy Willie" (Barks / Barks) "Old Demon Tooth" (Barks / Barks)	Reprinted from #101
176	May 1980	"A Spicy Tale" (Barks / Barks)	Reprinted from #39
177	June 1980	"Back To Long Ago!" (Barks / Barks)	Reprinted from #16
178	July 1980	"The Hypno-Plot" (Manning / Manning)	
179	September 1980	"The Lemming with the Locket" (Barks / Barks)	Reprinted from #9
180	November 1980	"Antique Antics" (Manning / Manning)	
181	December 1980	"The Horseradish Story" (Barks / Barks)	Reprinted from #3
182	January 1981	"Money and Magic" (Gregory / Gregory)	
183	February 1981	"Tralla La" (Barks / Barks)	Reprinted from #6
184	March 1981	"The Phantom of Notre Duck" (Barks / Barks)	Reprinted from #60
185	June 1981	"The Giant Robot Robbers" (Barks / Barks)	Reprinted from #58
186	July 1981	"The Convention" (Manning / Manning)	
187	August 1981	"Rug Riders in the Sky" (Barks / Barks)	Reprinted from #50
188	September 1981	"The Treasure Trek" (Wright / Wright)	
189	October 1981	"The Secret of Atlantis" (Barks / Barks)	Reprinted from #5
190	November 1981	"The Menehune Mystery" (Barks / Barks)	Reprinted from #4
191	December 1981	"Antique Antics" (Manning / Manning)	Reprinted from #180
192	January 1982	"The Cock-a-Doodle-Doo Mystery" (Alvarado / Alvarado)	
193	February 1982	"The Search for Spacifica" (Alvarado / Alvarado)	
194	February 1982	"The Inner-Earth Adventure" (Alvarado / Alvarado)	
195	March 1982	"Only A Poor Old Man" (Barks / Barks)	Reprinted from #1
196	April 1982	"Land Beneath the Ground!" (Barks / Barks)	Reprinted from #13
197	May 1982	"Playing It Safe" (Manning / Manning)	
198	January 1983	"The Mini-Bin Vacation" (Alvarado / Alvarado) "The Wreck of the Merry Lark" (Manning / Manning)	
199	February 1983	"Jillions in Jeopardy" (Manning / Manning) "Return of the Bin-Buster" (Manning / Manning)	
200	March 1983	"Marooned in Space" (Manning / Manning) "Isle of Ill Will" (Manning / Manning) "Convention Blues" (Manning / Manning)	
201	March 1983	"The Inside-Out Job" (Manning / Manning) "The Rich Whiffs" (Manning / Manning) "The Crystal Ball Mystery" (Manning / Manning)	
202	April 1983	"Trip to Tootum-Too" (Manning / Manning)	
203	April 1983	"The Golden Fleecing" (Barks / Barks)	Reprinted from #12
204	May 1983	"The Magnetic Curse" (Manning / Manning) "The Double Diamond" (Manning / Manning)	
205	May 1983	"The Space Game" (Manning / Manning) "In the Soup" (Alvarado / Alvarado) "Clipper Ship Caper" (Manning / Manning)	
206	January 1984	"Wreck of the Queen Bee" (Manning / Manning) "The Atom-Mover" (Manning / Manning)	
207	February 1984	"The Midas Touch" (Barks / Barks)	Reprinted from #36
208	March 1984	"Land of the Pygmy Indians" (Barks / Barks)	Reprinted from #18
209	April 1984	"The Money Well" (Barks / Barks)	Reprinted from #21

=== Gladstone Publishing (1986–1990) ===
Issue	Date	Stories (Writing / Art)	Notes
210	July 1986	"Terror of the Beagle Boys" (Barks / Barks)	Reprinted from Walt Disney's Comics and Stories #134
211	August 1986	"The Prize of Pizarro" (Barks / Barks, Clark, Feduniewicz)	Reprinted from #26
212	September 1986	"The Sunken Chest" (Katz, Sutter / Branca, Clark, Feduniewicz) "The Big Bin on Killmotor Hill" (Barks / Barks)	
213	October 1986	"City of Golden Roofs" (Barks / Barks)	Reprinted from #20
214	November 1986	"A Sticky Situation" (Lundgren, Anderson / Branca, Clark, Mausert) "The Tuckered Tiger" (Barks / Barks)	Reprinted from #9
215	December 1986	"A Cold Bargain" (Barks / Barks)	Reprinted from #17
216	January 1987	"Go Slowly Sands of Time" (Barks / Anderson, Vicar) "Spending Money" (Barks / Barks)	
217	February 1987	"The Seven Cities of Cibola" (Barks / Barks)	Reprinted from #7
218	March 1987	"Foul Play!" (Geradts / Verhagen) "Flour Follies" (Barks / Barks)	
219	April 1987	"The Son of the Sun" (Rosa / Rosa, Clark, McCormick)	
220	May 1987	"Nobody's Business" (Rosa / Rosa) "In Kakimaw Country" (Barks / Barks)	
221	June 1987	"The Green Attack" (Wejp-Olsen, Kenner / Branca, Spicer, McCormick)	
222	July 1987	"The Mysterious Stone Ray" (Barks / Barks)	Reprinted from #8
223	August 1987	"Fun? What's That?" (Barks / Barks)	
224	September 1987	"Cash Flow" (Rosa / Rosa)	
225	November 1987	"Many Happy Returns" (Bostock-Smith, Anderson / Vicar)	
226	February 1988	"Statuesque Spendthrifts" (Barks / Barks)	
227	April 1988	"As You Hike It" (Kruse / Phielix)	
228	May 1988	"Chugwagon Derby" (Barks / Barks) "The Generosity Ray" (Geradts / Verhagen)	Reprinted from #34
229	June 1988	"Double-Struck Duck" (Renard, Lilley / Vicar)	
230	July 1988	"Break-In Breakdown" (Kenner / Vicar)	
231	August 1988	"Too Safe Safe" (Barks / Barks)	
232	September 1988	"The Tenderfoot Trap" (Barks / Barks)	
233	November 1988	"Outfoxed Fox" (Barks / Barks) "Brainy Days" (Marschall, Sutter / Vicar)	Reprinted from #6
234	February 1989	"The Money Stairs" (Barks / Barks)	Reprinted from #101
235	April 1989	"The Curse of Nostrildamus" (Rosa / Rosa) "Itching to Know" (Trench, Anderson / Vicar)	
236	May 1989	"Boat Buster" (Barks / Barks) "It's a Dog's Life" (Renard, Anderson / Branca)	
237	June 1989	"Riches, Riches, Everywhere!" (Barks / Barks) "For Barter or Worse" (Renard, Bartholomew / Branca)	Reprinted from #11
238	July 1989	"Ducking the Press" (van den Bosch / Fonts) "Trouble Indemnity" (Barks / Barks)	
239	August 1989	"The Aberdeen Flash" (Wejp-Olsen, Anderson / Vicar) "The Floating Island" (Barks / Barks)	
240	September 1989	"Some Heir Over the Rainbow" (Barks / Barks) "A Raise by Any Other Name" (Vis / Fonts)	
241	November 1989	"The McDuck Foundation" (Scarpa / Scarpa) "How Green was my Lettuce" (Barks / Barks)	Reprinted from #51
242	January 1990	"The Last Balaboo" (Scarpa / Scarpa, Cimino) "The Loony Lunar Gold Rush" (Barks / Barks)	Reprinted from #49

=== Disney Comics (1990–1993) ===
Issue	Date	Stories (Writing / Art)	Notes
243	June 1990	"Pie In the Sky" (Riling / Van Horn) "The Carpocanth" (Halas, Sutter / Vicar)	
244	July 1990	"The Adventurers Club Award!" (Halas, Avenell / Vicar)	
245	August 1990	"The Phantom Lighthouse" (Langhans / Quartieri, Bat)	
246	September 1990	"Blossom and Jetsam" (Angus / Vicar)	
247	October 1990	"The Diamond Mines of Vladistinki" (Halas, Anderson / Vicar) "A Hard Day's Knight" (Katz, Anderson / Perez)	
248	November 1990	"Captain Doubloon's Parrot" (Galton, Avenell / Vicar)	
249	December 1990	"The Puffer" (Halas, Angus / Branca)	
250	January 1991	"The Lemming with the Locket" (Barks / Barks) "King Salomon's Mines" (Kenner / Vicar)	Reprinted from #9
251	February 1991	"Christmas In Duckburg" (Gregory / Barks)	
252	March 1991	"No Room for Human Error" (Lustig / Van Horn)	
253	April 1991	"The Fabulous Philosopher's Stone" (Barks / Barks)	Reprinted from #10
254	May 1991	"The Filling Station" (Renard, Avenell / Vicar)	
255	June 1991	"The Flying Dutchman" (Barks / Barks)	Reprinted from #25
256	July 1991	"The Status Seeker" (Barks / Barks)	Reprinted from #41
257	August 1991	"Coffee, Louie or Me?" (MacGillivray / Quartieri, Valenti, Barbero, Bat)	
258	September 1991	"The Swamp of No Return" (Barks / Barks)	Reprinted from #57
259	October 1991	"The Only Way to Go" (Halas, Bartholomew / Vicar) "A Day in the Life of Uncle Scrooge" (Sharland, Printz-Påhlson / Vicar)	
260	November 1991	"The Waves Above, The Gold Below" (Le Bars, Anderson / Fonts)	
261	December 1991	"Return to Xanadu" (part 1) (Rosa / Rosa)	
262	January 1992	"Return to Xanadu" (part 2) (Rosa / Rosa)	
263	February 1992	"Treasure under Glass" (Rosa / Rosa)	
264	March 1992	"Snobs' Club" (Renard, Avenell / Branca) "Better Safe Than Sorry" (Clack, Sutter / Branca) "The Wooden Bagpipes" (Antrobus, Cosser / Branca)	Reprinted from #240
265	April 1992	"Ten-Cent Valentine" (Barks / Barks) "The Criminal Club Eviction" (Antrobus, Printz-Påhlson / Vicar)	
266	May 1992	"The Money Ocean" (part 1) (Rota / Rota)	
267	June 1992	"The Money Ocean" (part 2) (Rota / Rota) "The Sceptre of Doom" (Enoksen, Printz-Påhlson / Vicar)	
268	July 1992	"Island in the Sky" (Barks / Barks) "Incident at McDuck Tower" (Rosa / Rosa)	Reprinted from #29
269	August 1992	"Plunkett's Emporium" (Halas, Sutter / Vicar) "The Flowers" (Antrobus, Sutter / Vicar)	
270	September 1992	"The 10 Cent Marathon" (Halas, Angus / Vicar) "The Hex" (Hansen / Jaime Diaz Studio)	
271	October 1992	"The Secret of the Stone" (Bühler, Angus / Hernandez)	
272	November 1992	"Canute the Brute's Battle Axe" (Fogedby, Bergström, Anderson / Vicar)	
273	December 1992	"House of Haunts" (Barks / Barks)	Reprinted from #63
274	January 1993	"Hall of the Mermaid Queen" (Barks / Barks, Chele)	Reprinted from #68
275	February 1993	"Christmas Cheers" (Barks / Barks) "Double Masquerade" (Barks, Craig / Barks)	
276	March 1993	"The Island at the Edge of Time" (Rosa / Rosa) "Smoke Writer in the Sky" (Barks / Barks)	
277	April 1993	"The Great Steamboat Race" (Barks / Barks)	Reprinted from #11
278	May 1993	"North of the Yukon" (Barks / Barks)	Reprinted from #59
279	June 1993	"Back To Long Ago!" (Barks / Barks)	Reprinted from #16
280	July 1993	"The Strange Shipwrecks" (Barks, George / Barks)	Reprinted from #23

=== Gladstone Publishing (1993–1998) ===
Issue	Date	Stories (Writing / Art)	Notes
281	June 1993	"Some Heir Over the Rainbow" (Barks / Barks) "A Matter Of Security" (Sharland, Anderson / Vicar)	Reprinted from #240
282	August 1993	"The Trouble With Dimes" (Barks / Barks) "Trouble Vision" (Bernstrup, Kenner / Vicar)	
283	October 1993	"Foxy Relations" (Barks / Barks)	
284	December 1993	"Turkey with All the Schemings" (Barks / Barks) "Who Needs People" (Kane, Martin / Branca)	
285	February 1994	"The Last of the Clan McDuck" (Rosa / Rosa) "Hidden Valley!" (Wejp-Olsen, Anderson / Vicar)	Chapter 1 of The Life and Times of Scrooge McDuck
286	April 1994	"The Master of the Mississippi" (Rosa / Rosa)	Chapter 2 of The Life and Times of Scrooge McDuck
287	June 1994	"The Buckaroo of the Badlands" (Rosa / Rosa) "Duckmade Disaster" (Barks / Jippes)	Chapter 3 of The Life and Times of Scrooge McDuck
288	August 1994	"Raider of the Copper Hill" (Rosa / Rosa) "The Fickle Fortune-finder" (Lockman / Strobl, Steere)	Chapter 4 of The Life and Times of Scrooge McDuck; Reprinted from #78
289	October 1994	"The New Laird of Castle McDuck" (Rosa / Rosa) "I. O. U. ... But Who?" (Lockman / Strobl, Steere)	Chapter 5 of The Life and Times of Scrooge McDuck; Reprinted from #78
290	December 1994	"The Terror of the Transvaal" (Rosa / Rosa) "Bye-Bye, Money Bin" (Lockman / Strobl, Steere)	Chapter 6 of The Life and Times of Scrooge McDuck; Reprinted from #76
291	February 1995	"Dreamtime Duck of the Never-Never" (Rosa / Rosa) "A Case of Too Much Money" (Kenner, Collins / Vicar, Klinger, Vincent)	Chapter 7 of The Life and Times of Scrooge McDuck
292	April 1995	"King of the Klondike" (Rosa / Rosa)	Chapter 8 of The Life and Times of Scrooge McDuck
293	June 1995	"The Billionaire of Dismal Downs" (Rosa / Rosa) "Gold of the '49ers" (Barks / Jippes)	Chapter 9 of The Life and Times of Scrooge McDuck
294	August 1995	"The Invader of Fort Duckburg" (Rosa / Rosa) "E.A.T." (Bakker, Anderson / Branca)	Chapter 10 of The Life and Times of Scrooge McDuck
295	October 1995	"The Empire-Builder from Calisota" (Rosa / Rosa)	Chapter 11 of The Life and Times of Scrooge McDuck
296	December 1995	"The Richest Duck in the World" (Rosa / Rosa)	Chapter 12 of The Life and Times of Scrooge McDuck
297	February 1996	"Of Ducks, Dimes and Destinies" (Rosa / Rosa, Daigle-Leach) "No Dime for Stardom" (Renard, Avenell / Branca, Winkler)	Chapter 0 of The Life and Times of Scrooge McDuck
298	April 1996	"The Pauper's Glass" (Van Horn / Van Horn)	
299	June 1996	"Too Safe Safe" (Barks / Barks)	Reprinted from #231
300	August 1996	"The Sunken Yacht" (Barks / Barks) "Coin of the Realm" (Van Horn / Van Horn) "Go Slowly Sands of Time" (Barks, Anderson / Vicar) "Nobody's Business" (Rosa / Rosa)	Reprinted from #216; Reprinted from #220
301	October 1996	"Statuesque Spendthrifts" (Barks / Barks) "The Moving Money Bin" (Langhans / Vicar)	Reprinted from #226
302	December 1996	"Monkey Business" (Barks / Barks)	
303	February 1997	"Rocks to Riches" (Barks / Barks) "The Case of the Gold Bars" (Lockman / Strobl, Royer)	
304	April 1997	"Mr. Private Eye" (Barks / Barks, Grossman) "A Day in the Life of Scrooge" (Sharland, Printz-Påhlson / Vicar, Rockwell) "Super Beagles" (Lockman / Strobl, Steere, Hinton)	Reprinted from #259
305	May 1997	"Flour Follies" (Barks / Barks) "A Matter of Factory" (Gregory, Barks / Barks)	Reprinted from #218
306	July 1997	"The Vigilante of Pizen Bluff" (Rosa / Rosa)	Chapter 6B of The Life and Times of Scrooge McDuck
307	September 1997	"The Plane Truth" (Renard, Claxton / Peinado) "Temper, Temper" (Transgaard / Canos)	
308	November 1997	"Winifred's Revenge" (Kruse / Heymans)	
309	January 1998	"W.H.A.D.A.L.O.T.T.A.J.A.R.G.O.N." (Rosa / Rosa) "Money to Burn" (Kane, Martin / Vicar) "Deep Sea Trouble" (Hedman / Vicar) "King of Fools" (Lewis, Anderson / Fonts)	
310	April 1998	"The Sign of the Triple Distelfink" (Rosa / Rosa) "The Spider Yarn" (Halas, Claxton / Bresco) "A Sticky Story" (Hedman / Peinado) "Back To Long Ago!" (Barks / Barks)	Reprinted from #16
311	May 1998	"The Last Lord of Eldorado" (Rosa / Rosa) "The Black Widow" (Renard, Sutter / Fonts) "Outfoxed Fox" (Barks / Barks)	Reprinted from #6
312	June 1998	"The Hands of Zeus" (Kruse / Heymans, Comicup Studio) "Cold Duck" (McGreal / Fonts) "Bolivar, the Beagle Catcher" (Sharland, Bartholomew / Branca)	
313	July 1998	"Trapped in Castle Rollingstein" (Kruse / Verhagen) "The Fantastic River Race" (Barks / Barks)	
314	August 1998	"The Black Knight" (Rosa / Rosa) "The Midas Touch" (Barks / Barks)	Reprinted from #36
315	September 1998	"The Flying Scot" (part 1) (Scarpa / Scarpa, Gatto) "Sagmore Springs Hotel" (Barks / Barks) "The Bungee Jumpers" (McGreal / Vicar)	
316	October 1998	"The Flying Scot" (part 2) (Scarpa / Scarpa, Gatto) "The Runaway Train" (Barks / Barks) "Celluloid Saps" (Kane, Martin / Fonts) "A Curious Cure" (Lewis, Claxton / Hernandez)	
317	November 1998	"Memories" (Lustig / Vicar) "The Code of Duckburg" (Barks / Barks) "The Icy Touch" (Gilbert / Van Horn) "Pawns of the Loup Garou" (Barks / Strobl, Liggera)	
318	December 1998	"The Cowboy Captain of the Cutty Sark" (Rosa / Rosa) "Secrets" (Van Horn / Van Horn)	Chapter 3B of The Life and Times of Scrooge McDuck

=== Gemstone Publishing (2003–2008) ===
Issue	Date	Stories (Writing / Art)	Notes
319	June 2003	"The Dutchman's Secret" (Rosa / Rosa, Clark, Rockwell) "Terror of the Beagle Boys" (Barks / Barks, Daigle-Leach) "Family of Fore" (Lustig / Vicar, Schubert, Miller)	Reprinted from #210
320	July 2003	"Fools of the Trade" (Van Horn / Van Horn, Leach) "The Big Break-In" (Fallberg / Scarpa, Zemolin, Schubert, Rockwell) "World Wide Witch" (Blum / Branca, Babcock, Daigle-Leach)	
321	August 2003	"Attaaack!" (Rosa / Rosa, Clark, Rockwell) "Smellbound" (Transgaard / Lopez, Babcock, Grossman) "Dime and Dime Again" (part 1) (Barks, Blum / Mota, Rockwell)	
322	September 2003	"The Utter Limits" (Leach / Van Horn, Leach, Daigle-Leach) "Dime and Dime Again" (part 2) (Barks, Blum / Mota, Rockwell) "One Million Chase" (Scarpa / Scarpa, Del Conte, Lee, Grossman)	
323	October 2003	"The Coin" (Rosa / Rosa, Clark, Rockwell) "Billions in the Hole" (Barks / Barks, Rockwell) "Travails" (Van Horn / Van Horn, Daigle-Leach)	Reprinted from #33
324	November 2003	"Gyro's First Invention" (Rosa / Rosa, Clark, Daigle-Leach) "The Round Money Bin" (Barks / Barks, Rockwell) "The Ghost of Coot Bridge" (Zeeman / Barreira, Comicup Studio, Lee, Rockwell) "A Dime for Your Thoughts" (Van Horn / Van Horn, Rockwell)	Reprinted from #172
325	December 2003	"The Beagle Boys vs. The Money Bin" (Rosa / Rosa, Shane, Clark) "The Lodgers" (Hedman / Vicar, Schubert, Rockwell) "Back to the Klondike" (Barks / Barks, Daigle-Leach)	Reprinted from #2
326	January 2004	"Old Jack's Island" (Rota / Rota) "An Entangling Encounter" (Transgaard / Estéban) "The Whistling Ghost" (Van Horn / Van Horn)	
327	February 2004	"The Golden Throne Legend" (Rota / Rota) "The Inventing Invention" (Martin / Vicar) "Gold Foolery" (Jensen, Spencer / Vicar)	
328	March 2004	"Forget It!" (Rosa / Rosa, Clark, Rockwell) "A Crushing Cruise" (Transgaard / Fonts, Leach, Javins) "The Bedeviled Dime" (Van Horn / Van Horn, Daigle-Leach)	
329	April 2004	"The Dream of a Lifetime" (Rosa / Rosa) "Considerably Richer" (Halas / Vicar)	
330	May 2004	"Flying High" (Van Horn / Van Horn) "Nuts After Nuts" (Transgaard / Gattino) "The Titanic Ants!" (Barks / Barks)	
331	June 2004	"His Majesty, McDuck" (Rosa / Rosa) "Wailing Whalers" (Barks / Jippes)	
332	July 2004	"The Sharpie of the Culebra Cut" (Rosa / Rosa) "Mobile Millions" (Transgaard / Hernandez)	Chapter 10B of The Life and Times of Scrooge McDuck
333	August 2004	"The Polar Princess" (Transgaard / Wattino) "Billions to Sneeze At" (Barks / Barks) "King of the Apes" (Jonker, Hoogma / Barreira, Comicup Studio) "One With the Wind" (Scarpa / Scarpa, Del Conte)	Reprinted from #246
334	September 2004	"The Quest for Kalevala" (Rosa / Rosa) "The Lost Peg Leg Mine" (Barks / Barks) "Salesman Extraordinaire" (Hedman / Manrique)	
335	October 2004	"The Son of the Sun" (Rosa / Rosa) "The Old, Old Fishing Hole" (Gilbert / Peinado, Perea) "Rodent's Ransom" (Barks / Jippes)	Reprinted from #219
336	November 2004	"A Christmas for Shacktown" (Barks / Barks) "The Egyptian Prince's Secret" (Rota / Rota) "Christmas Magic" (Hedman / Vicar)	
337	December 2004	"Can I Bring Anything?" (Korhonen / Korhonen) "Trash Or Treasure" (Rosa / Rosa) "Action Island" (Hedman / Fonts)	
338	January 2005	"The Horseradish Story" (Barks / Barks) "The Secret of Success" (Scarpa / Scarpa, Cimino)	Reprinted from #105
339	February 2005	"The Crown of the Crusader Kings" (Rosa / Rosa) "In Quest Of The Green Hope" (Branca, Gattino / Branca, Torreiro, Gerstein) "The Great Wig Mystery" (Barks / Barks)	Reprinted from #52
340	March 2005	"The Heedless Horseman" (Barks / Barks) "Golden Illusion" (Transgaard / Vicar) "Jumbled Ducks" (McGreal / Vicar)	Reprinted from #66
341	April 2005	"The Magic Hourglass" (Barks / Barks) "Around the World in Eighty Daze" (Kinney / Scarpa, Cavazzano)	
342	May 2005	"The Old Castle's Other Secret or A Letter From Home" (Rosa / Rosa) "Raven Mad" (Barks / Barks)	
343	June 2005	"A Knight To Remember" (McGreal / Massaroli) "Security" (LaBan / Scarpa, Michieli) "Being Donald Duck" (Solstrand / Núñez)	
344	July 2005	"Fishpond Frenzy" (Halas, Rota / Rota) "All You Need Is Love" (LaBan / Scarpa, Michieli) "The Cattle King" (Barks / Barks)	Reprinted from #69
345	August 2005	"King Scrooge The First" (Barks / Strobl, Steere, Rockwell) "X-Treme Scrooge" (LaBan / Peinado, Perea, Schubert, Grossman) "Feed For Greed" (Transgaard / Manrique, Lee, Grossman)	Reprinted from #71
346	September 2005	"The Funny Carrots" (Scarpa / Scarpa, Michieli, Schubert, Kraiger) "One Thin Dime" (McGreal / Massaroli, Barbero, Schubert, Grossman) "The Way The Cookie Crumbles" (McGreal / Vicar, Babcock, Pratt)	
347	October 2005	"Escape From Forbidden Valley" (Rosa / Rosa, Babcock, Rockwell) "Don Quiduck de la Mancha" (Jonker / Heymans, Dillon, Letterman) "The Scrooge Museum" (Gilbert / Vicar, Schubert, Pratt)	
348	November 2005	"The Hunt for White December" (Katz, Avenell / Branca, Babcock, Grossman) "The Christmas That Almost Wasn't" (Gilbert / Vicar, Lee, Rockwell) "The Duckburg Ice Festival" (Gilbert / Vicar, Schubert, Grossman)	
349	December 2005	"The Doom Diamond" (Barks / Barks, Hinton) "Smarter Than The Toughies" (Jensen / Branca, Lee, Pratt)	Reprinted from #70
350	January 2006	"Last Sled To Dawson" (Rosa / Rosa, Clark, Daigle-Leach) "Date With A Munchkin" (Korhonen / Vicar, Schubert, Javins) "What Goes Around" (Jensen, Rota / Rota, Babcock, Javins)	
351	February 2006	"Anti-dollarosis" (Scarpa / Scarpa, Babcock, Javins) "White Gold" (Hansegård / Vicar, Lee, Grossman)	
352	March 2006	"Isle of Golden Geese" (Barks / Barks, Daigle-Leach) "The Great Egg Hunt!" (Hubbard / Babcock, Javins) "The Bunny Song" (Transgaard / Vicar, Schubert, Kraiger)	Reprinted from #45
353	April 2006	"The Great Paint Robbery" (Pujol / Aguilar, Montero, Manzano, Núñez, Schubert) "Tutu Traumatic" (Hamill / Vicar, Lee, Grossman)	
354	May 2006	"The Black Knight Glorps Again!" (Rosa / Rosa, Babcock, Rockwell) "No Thanks for the Memories" (Korhonen / Massaroli, Lee, Grossman) "Passport To Lisbon" (Pujol / Pujol, Schubert, Pratt)	
355	June 2006	"The Mysterious Stone Ray" (Barks / Barks, Daigle-Leach) "Bottled Battlers" (Barks / Jippes, Babcock, Daigle-Leach) "Something From Nothing" (Kołodziejczak / Vicar, Lee, Rockwell)	Reprinted from #8
356	July 2006	"Hall of the Mermaid Queen" (Barks / Barks) "It Must Be Magic" (LaBan / Martinez) "Everything's Coming Up Rubies" (Halas / Lopez)	Reprinted from #68
357	August 2006	"Return to Xanadu" (Rosa / Rosa, Klein, Daigle-Leach) "Comet Get It!" (Korhonen / Hernandez, Lee, Pratt)	Reprinted from #261 and #262
358	September 2006	"House of Haunts" (Barks / Barks, Daigle-Leach) "Let Sleeping Bones Lie" (Barks / Jippes, Babcock, Grossman) "The Terror of Outer Space" (Printz-Påhlson / Vicar, Lee, Pratt)	Reprinted from #63
359	October 2006	"The Incredible Shrinking Tightwad" (Rosa / Rosa, Clark, Rockwell) "Old Folks at Home" (McGreal / Massaroli, Klein, Javins) "The Keeper of Babylon Gardens" (Jensen / Scarpa, Michieli, Myerly, Kraiger)	
360	November 2006	"Being Good For Goodness Sake" (Chendi / Scarpa, Cimino, Klein, Rockwell) "Return Of The Terror" (Printz-Påhlson / Vicar, Schubert, Pratt) "Operation Vesuvius" (Printz-Påhlson / Branca, Babcock, Javins)	
361	December 2006	"Oddball Odyssey" (Barks / Barks, Rockwell) "Filthy Rich" (Lustig / Fonts, Babcock, Pratt) "A Trailblazing Tale" (Transgaard / Wattino, Klein, Daigle-leach)	Reprinted from #40
362	January 2007	"Return to Plain Awful" (Rosa / Rosa, Clark, Daigle-Leach) "Red Roses And Blueberry Pie" (McGreal / Peinado, Perea, Schubert, Pratt) "The Dollar Stalactite" (Scarpa / Scarpa, Del Conte, Babcock, Grossman)	
363	February 2007	"Night of the Saracen" (Rota / Rota, Schubert, Pratt) "A Dime in Time" (Smeby / Vicar, Lee, Javins) "Designed to Sell" (Transgaard / Lopez, Klein, Rockwell)	
364	March 2007	"The Case of the Sticky Money" (Barks / Barks, Rockwell) "Scrambled Eggs" (McGreal / Peinado, Perea, Babcock, Rockwell) "The Nest Egg" (Jensen / Peinado, Perea, Lee)	Reprinted from #42
365	April 2007	"Treasure Under Glass" (Rosa / Rosa, Davidson, Palomino) "It's Joust Love" (Börner, Milton / Milton, Babcock, Pratt) "Law and Disorder" (Korhonen / Branca, Gattino, Kolberg)	Reprinted from #263
366	May 2007	"Guilty as Charged" (Halas / Martinez, Seitler) "Body Swap" (Jensen / Massaroli, Barbero, Gerstein) "Write Thinking" (Gilbert / Vicar, Clark)	
367	June 2007	"The Golden River" (Barks / Barks, Rockwell) "Boxing Donald" (Hedman / Vicar, Gerstein) "Heads You Win... Tails You Bruise!" (Jensen / Vicar, Gerstein)	Reprinted from #22
368	July 2007	"Cloned Again, Unnaturally!" (Petrucha / Fecchi, Seitler) "The Other Gyro Gearloose" (Gilbert / Massaroli, Kolberg)	
369	August 2007	"Healers of the Andes!" (Barten, Hoogma, Jonker, Polman / Heymans, Seitler) "The Saga of the Debit and Credit Ledger" (Strobl / Strobl, Gerstein) "Sub-Sub-Zero" (Branca, Gattino / Branca, Gattino, Seitler)	
370	September 2007	"Brother From Another Earth!" (Salvagnini / Cavazzano, Gerstein) "The Spirit of Fear" (Jonker / Gulien, Seitler) "The Synthezoid From the Deepest Void!" (Jensen, Spencer / Vicar, Gerstein)	
371	October 2007	"How Green was my Lettuce" (Barks / Barks, Rockwell) "The Gloves Of King Midas" (Jensen / Hernandez, Gerstein) "The Electronic Hissyfitter" (Faccini / Faccini, Leach) "Higher Than Mount Everest" (Oost / Heymans, Leenheer, Kolberg)	Reprinted from #51
372	November 2007	"Christmas on Bear Mountain" (Barks / Barks, Rockwell) "The Treasury of Croesus" (Rosa / Rosa, Schubert, Rockwell)	
373	December 2007	"Last Hero of Banania" (Cimino / Scarpa, Cavazzano, Gerstein) "Slightings" (Jensen, Spencer / Vicar, Seitler) "Way Out of Africa" (Korhonen / Peinado, Perea, Gerstein)	
374	January 2008	"A Gal For Gladstone" (McGreal / Fecchi, Kolberg) "Rainbow Raiders" (Jensen / Pelaez, Gerstein) "Easy Circumstances" (Van Horn / Van Horn)	
375	February 2008	"The Twenty-four Carat Moon" (Barks / Barks, Daigle-Leach) "Curses" (LaBan / Pelaez, Clark) "The Hard-Shelled Sage of Duckburg" (Hansegård / Peinado, Perea, Seitler) "The Laurels of Julius Pecunius" (Kruse / Heymans / Gerstein)	Reprinted from #24
376	March 2008	"The Easter Eggs-Port" (Cimino / Scarpa, Cavazzano, Gerstein) "The Richest Tycoon in the World" (McGreal / Peinado, Perea, Kolberg) "Happy Birthday, Flintheart Glomgold" (Jensen / Vicar, Seitler)	
377	April 2008	"Power Play On Killmotor Hill" (Barks, Blum / Fecchi, Clark) "Scent Of A Sorceress" (Blum / Mota, Kolberg) "Wag The Dog" (Blum / Branca, Seitler) "Race for the Golden Apples" (Barks, Blum / Jippes, Gerstein)	
378	May 2008	"Taking the Plunge" (Barosso / Scarpa, Cimino, Kolberg) "Boat Buster" (Barks / Barks, Vincent) "The Legend of the Spanish Fort" (Rota / Rota, Clark)	Reprinted from #236
379	June 2008	"The Phantom of Notre Duck" (Barks / Barks, Daigle-Leach) "Wreckered Time" (Transgaard / Pelaez, Clark) "A Soft Job For a Hard Head" (Lustig / Estéban, Kolberg)	Reprinted from #60
380	July 2008	"The Island at the Edge of Time" (Rosa / Rosa, Clark) "The Legendary Crown of Queen Kazabra" (Hedman / Peinado, Perea, Seitler) "The Treasure of Alexander the Great" (Zeeman / Bernado, Clark)	Reprinted from #276
381	August 2008	"Breakfast of Champions" (Concina / Molinari, Gerstein) "Spending Money" (Barks / Barks, Daigle-Leach) "Homeward Hound" (Korhonen / Núñez, Seitler)	Reprinted from #216
382	September 2008	"The Money Champ" (Barks / Barks, De Lellis) "Scrooge's Workshop" (Hansegård / Massaroli, Gerstein) "The Madness of King Scrooge!" (Hansegård / Vicar, Clark)	Reprinted from #27
383	October 2008	"Guardians of the Lost Library" (Rosa / Rosa, Taylor) "Gloom of the Unknown Author" (Straatman / Heymans, Clark, Seitler) "Senior Woodchuck" (Korhonen / Korhonen, Rodriguez, Kolberg)	

=== Boom! Kids (2009–2011) ===
Issue	Date	Stories (Writing / Art)	Notes
384	October 2009	"The Ghostly Carriage" (Hedman / Gattino, Terriquez) "Salt and Gold" (part 1) (Hedman / Gattino, Terriquez)	
385	November 2009	"Salt and Gold" (part 2) (Hedman / Gattino, Macasocol, Terriquez) "Ancestor's Diamonds" (Hedman / Mota, Macosocol, Terriquez)	
386	December 2009	"Weapons of the Vikings" (Hedman / Gattino, Macosocol, Terriquez) "The Gold Hunt" (part 1) (Hedman / Gattino, Macasocol, Terriquez)	
387	January 2010	"The Gold Hunt" (part 2) (Hedman / Gattino, Macasocol, Terriquez) "The Fateful Hour" (Hedman / Gattino, Macasocol, Terriquez)	
388	February 2010	"Around the World in 80 Bucks" (part 1) (Staff di IF / Paroline, Terriquez, Francesc Bargadà Studio)	
389	March 2010	"Around the World in 80 Bucks" (part 2) (Staff di IF / Paroline, Terriquez, Francesc Bargadà Studio)	
390	April 2010	"Around the World in 80 Bucks" (part 3) (Staff di IF / Paroline, Terriquez, Francesc Bargadà Studio)	
391	May 2010	"Around the World in 80 Bucks" (part 4) (Staff di IF / Paroline, Terriquez, Francesc Bargadà Studio)	
392	June 2010	"Like a Hurricane Part 1: The Everlasting Coal" (Halas, Anderson / Mateu, Macasocol, Terriquez) "The Littlest Gizmoduck" (Weber, Willson / Santillo, Macasocol, Terriquez)	Part of the DuckTales franchise
393	July 2010	"Like a Hurricane Part 2: The Pyramid of Prak-Ti-Kal" (le Bornec / Carreras, Macasocol, Terriquez, Comicup Studio) "A Switch in Time" (Murray / Quartieri, Gattino, Bat, Macasocol, Terriquez)	Part of the DuckTales franchise
394	August 2010	"Like a Hurricane Part 3: The Curse of Flabbergé" (part 1) (Maine / Blasi, Macasocol, Comicup Studio)	Part of the DuckTales franchise
395	September 2010	"Like a Hurricane Part 4: The Curse of Flabbergé" (part 2) (Maine / Blasi, Macasocol, Comicup Studio)	Part of the DuckTales franchise
396	October 2010	"Lovelorn Launchpad" (Halas, Sutter / Lopez, Arthur, Jourdan) "Double Indemnity" (Langhans / Lopez, Arthur, Jordan)	Part of the DuckTales franchise
397	November 2010	"The Last Auction Hero" (Halas, Angus / Lopez, Arthur, Jourdan) "Big Blimp In Little Trouble" (Transgaard / Lopez, Arthur, Jourdan)	Part of the DuckTales franchise
398	December 2010	"The Belt of Time" (Neto / Neto) "Christmas Cheers" (Barks / Barks / Daigle-Leach)	Part of the DuckTales franchise Reprinted from #275
399	January 2011	"The Arcadian Urn" (Halas, Anderson / Lopez, Arthur, Jourdan)	Part of the DuckTales franchise
400	February 2011	"The Man Who Drew Ducks" (Salvagnini / Cavazzano, Zemolin, Gerstein) "Obsession" (Erickson / Jippes, Gerstein)	
401	March 2011	"The Universal Solvent" (Rosa / Rosa / Gerstein)	
402	April 2011	"The Fabulous Philosopher's Stone" (Barks / Barks)	Reprinted from #10
403	May 2011	"The Pelican Thief" (Scarpa / Cavazzano, Gerstein)	
404	June 2011	"The Fifty Money Bins Caper" (Gazzarri / Scarpa, Cavazzano, Gerstein)	

=== IDW Publishing (2015–2020) ===
Issue	Date	Stories (Writing / Art)	Notes
1 (405)	April 2015	Gigabeagle: King of the Robot Robbers (Cimino / Scarpa, Cavazzano, Long); Stinker, Tailor, Scrooge and Sly (Scarpa, Boschi / Scarpa, Del Conte, Long)	
2 (406)	May 2015	Shiver Me Timbers! (Kruse / Heymans, Long); Meteor Rights (Jonker, Hoogma / Aguilar, Long, Comicup Studio)	
3 (407)	June 2015	The Duckburg 100 (Scarpa / Scarpa, Cimino, Long)	
4 (408)	July 2015	The Grand Canyon Conquest! (part 1) (Pujol / Pujol, Parramón, Espí, Long, Verlag); Belle Corners The Coin Collection (Hubbard / Long)	
5 (409)	August 2015	The Grand Canyon Conquest! (part 2) (Pujol / Pujol, Parramón, Espí, Seitler, Verlag); The Inventors' Picnic (Milton / Milton, Seitler)	
6 (410)	September 2015	The Bigger Operator (Pezzin / Rota, Seitler)	
7 (411)	October 2015	Mummy Fearest (Scarpa / Scarpa, Zemolin, Seitler)	
8 (412)	November 2015	The Peril of Pandora's Box (Buitink / Heymans, Seitler, Comicup Studio); The Dashingest Dudebro (Geradts / Heymans, Collé, Seitler)	
9 (413)	December 2015	Another Christmas on Bear Mountain (Faraci / Cavazzano, Zemolin, Seitler)	
10 (414)	January 2016	The Eternal Knot (Barosso / Scarpa, Cimino, Leach)	
11 (415)	February 2016	Scrooge's Ark Lark (Pezzin / Carpi, Seitler); Bad Things Come in Threes (Jensen / Peinado, Perea, Seitler)	
12 (416)	March 2016	Ten Little Millionaires (McGreal / Cavazzano, Seitler)	
13 (417)	April 2016	Scrooge's Last Adventure (part 1) (Artibani / Perina, Seitler)	
14 (418)	May 2016	Scrooge's Last Adventure (part 2) (Artibani / Perina, Seitler)	
15 (419)	June 2016	Scrooge's Last Adventure (part 3) (Artibani / Perina, Seitler)	
16 (420)	July 2016	Scrooge's Last Adventure (part 4) (Artibani / Perina, Seitler, Gerstein)	
17 (421)	August 2016	Scrooge vs. Scrooge! (Solstrand / Midthun, Seitler); Gyro's Manager (Barks, Lustig / Jippes, Seitler); The Biggest Fleet in the World! (Kinney / Hubbard, Seitler)	
18 (422)	September 2016	The Miner's Granddaughter (Scarpa / Scarpa, Cavazzano, Seitler)	
19 (423)	October 2016	Himalayan Hideout (Hansegård / Peinado, Seitler); When Magica Won (Solstrand / Van Horn, Seitler)	
20 (424)	November 2016	Tyrant of the Tides (Artibani / Mastantuono, Seitler, Rosengarten, Andolfo)	
21 (425)	December 2016	The Substitute Santa of Strathbungo (Nærum, Løkling / Midthun, Post); The Roundabout Rally (Kinney / Strobl, Steere, Post)	
22 (426)	January 2017	The Golden Birds (Boschi, Scarpa / Boschi, Scarpa, Del Conte, Seitler)	
23 (427)	February 2017	The Third Nile (part 1) (Corteggiani / Cavazzano, Seitler)	
24 (428)	March 2017	The Third Nile (part 2) (Corteggiani / Cavazzano, Seitler)	
25 (429)	April 2017	The Hansa Hazard! (Nærum, Løkling / Midthun, Seitler)	
26 (430)	May 2017	The Villainous Vase Case! (Gazzarri / Cavazzano, Seitler)	
27 (431)	June 2017	The Bodacious Butterfly Trail (part 1) (Scarpa / Scarpa, Cimino, Seitler)	
28 (432)	July 2017	The Bodacious Butterfly Trail (part 2) (Scarpa / Scarpa, Cimino, Seitler)	
29 (433)	August 2017	The Great Cackle Caper (Rota / Rota, Seitler); The Terrible Thinking Cap Tussle (Lockman / Strobl, Steere, Seitler)	
30 (434)	September 2017	The Tourist at the End of the Universe (Chendi / Cavazzano, Seitler)	
31 (435)	October 2017	Sins of the Sorcery Summit (Kruse / Gulien, Seitler); Belle, Book and Bungle (Jensen / Van Horn, Seitler)	
32 (436)	November 2017	Whom the Gods Would Destroy! (Erickson / Fecchi, Seitler)	
33 (437)	December 2017	Scare of the Sky Satellite (Chendi / Cavazzano, Seitler)	
34 (438)	January 2018	The Wonderful Wishing Crown! (Stabile / Perina, Seitler)	
35 (439)	February 2018	A Tale of Two Biddies (Fontana / Mazzarello, Seitler)	
36 (440)	March 2018	Treasure Above the Clouds (Fallberg / Rota, Seitler); Peril of the Black Forest (Barks / Jippes, Seitler)	
37 (441)	April 2018	Money Is the Root of Upheaval! (Siegel / Scarpa, Seitler)	
38 (442)	May 2018	Mismatched Mentors (McGreal / Cavazzano, Seitler)	
39 (443)	June 2018	The Colossal Coin Calamity (Sio / Intini, Seitler)	
40 (444)	July 2018	The Case of the Circulating Saucer (Chendi / Cavazzano, Seitler); So Dear to His Heart (Åstrup / Gattino, Seitler)	
41 (445)	January 2019	The Time Vortex (Panaro / De Lorenzi, Long)	
42 (446)	February 2019	The World of Ideas (Marinato / Cavazzano, Long)	
43 (447)	March 2019	The Helpful Hammock (Stabile / Guerrini, Long)	
44 (448)	April 2019	The Crowded Newsroom (Savini / Tosolini, Long)	
45 (449)	May 2019	The Captain's Sequoia (Artibani / Perina, Long)	
46 (450)	June 2019	The Cursed Cell Phone (Gentina / Intini, Long)	
47 (451)	July 2019	Under Siege! (Part 1) (Stabile / Zemelo, Franzo, Long)	
48 (452)	August 2019	Under Siege! (Part 2) (Stabile / Zemelo, Franzo, Osorio)	
49 (453)	September 2019	Under Siege! (Part 3) (Stabile / Zemelo, Franzo, Osorio)	
50 (454)	October 2019	Under Siege! (Part 4) (Stabile / Zemelo, Franzo, Osorio)	
51 (455)	November 2019	My Fifth Million (Vitaliano / Di Lorenzi, Osorio)	
52 (456)	December 2019	My Sixth Million (Vitaliano / Mazzarello, Osorio)	
53 (457)	January 2020	My Seventh Million (Vitaliano / Dalla Santa, Osorio)	
54 (458)	February 2020	My Eighth Million (Vitaliano / Pastrovicchio, Osorio)	
55 (459)	March 2020	The New Adventures of the McDuck Dynasty: Chapter One: The Precious Plot (Sisti / Sciarrone, Osorio)	
56 (460)	April 2020	The New Adventures of the McDuck Dynasty: Chapter Two: The Secret of Oceanium (Sisti / Sciarrone, Osorio)	

=== Fantagraphics (2025-) ===
Issue	Date	Stories (Writing / Art)	Notes
1 (461)	October 2025	Flintheart Glomgold's Sinister Secret! (Part 1) (Artibani / Perina, Baresh)	
2 (462)	November 2025	Flintheart Glomgold's Sinister Secret! (Part 2) (Artibani / Perina, Baresh)	
3 (463)	December 2025	Flintheart Glomgold's Sinister Secret! (Part 3) (Artibani / Perina, Baresh)	
4 (464)	January 2026	The McDuck Journals: The Klondike Years (Korhonen, Baresh / Horak)	
5 (465)	February 2026	First Aiders of Dawson (Panaro / Vetro, Baresh / Horak); Klondike Calculations (Nærum / Midthun, Baresh / Horak)	
6 (466)	March 2026	By Moonlight's Blight (Stabile / Guerrini, Baresh / Horak)	
7 (467)	April 2026	The McDuck Journals: The Duckburg Years (Korhonen, Baresh / Horak)	

Released Jun 17, 2020 due to shutdowns from the COVID-19 pandemic in the United States.
