= Junior Woodchucks =

Disney comics characters

The Junior Woodchucks of the World emblem. It is based on the acronym of the organization's name and an upside down version of an image of Thoth, the Egyptian God of Knowledge, that was used by the Guardians of the Library of Alexandria.

The Junior Woodchucks of the World is a fictional scouting organization appearing in Disney comics and the DuckTales animated television franchise, most notably in adventures featuring Disney characters Huey, Dewey, and Louie as members.

The Junior Woodchucks were created by Carl Barks in 1951, in the story "Operation St. Bernard" (Walt Disney's Comics and Stories #125). Later stories introduced a similar organization for girls, the Littlest Chickadees, to which Daisy Duck's nieces, April, May and June, belong. The hallmark of the Junior Woodchucks is their spirited dedication to environmental protection, animal welfare and international peace, as well as the preservation of knowledge and the furtherance of science & technology. They are also known for their exalted titles & ranks (Huey, Dewey, and Louie being promoted to become Ten-Star Generals in the 1951 story of the same name) and the awarding of buckets of badges, along with strict ideals as to their certain decorum. In this way Barks poked gentle but pointed satire at some aspects of the Boy Scouts of America.

Members always carry with them a copy of the Junior Woodchucks' Guidebook, a fictional guidebook filled with detailed and pertinent information about whatever country or situation the Woodchucks find themselves, ranging from the basic to the incredibly obscure. Its depth of coverage is remarkable, considering that it is a small paperback book. Narratively, the book is a device that allows the story's writer to insert any information or exposition that's needed to move the story forward.

Most of the early Junior Woodchucks stories appeared in Walt Disney's Comics and Stories, with some notable appearances in Uncle Scrooge. In 1966, they got their own title, Huey, Dewey, and Louie and the Junior Woodchucks, published by Gold Key Comics for 62 issues, and then continued by Whitman Comics for another 20 issues until 1983. The stories which Carl Barks wrote for this comic book, among the last comic book stories he scripted, were drawn by Kay Wright, John Carey and Tony Strobl. More recently Daan Jippes has been commissioned by Egmont to redraw these stories emulating Barks' style and drawing inspiration from the sketches of Barks' storyboard-like scripts.

The non-Disney strip Big Nate also features a scouting organisation with the same name, to which eponymous Nate Wright and his friends Francis Pope and Teddy Ortiz belong, which was later changed to the Timber Scouts.

== History ==
The Junior Woodchucks first appeared in Barks' 10-page Donald Duck story "Operation St Bernard" (WDC&S #125, February 1951). While the Woodchucks ultimately became a familiar and beloved element in the Duck universe, Barks' original intention was satirical. Thomas Andrae says, "Throughout the story, Barks satirizes the Woodchucks' elitism, obsession with rank, and paramilitary discipline. Major is the lowest rank in the Woodchucks, and every trooper has a lofty title and wears quarts of medals... Parodying the mystique of military language, Barks makes a running gag of converting Woodchuck titles into unintelligible acronyms."

The Junior Woodchucks stories tended to "civilize" the nephews, who were usually seen as mischievous and immature in the 1940s. In the second Woodchucks story, "Ten-Star Generals" (WDC&S #132, Sept 1951), the boys are very serious about passing their scout tests in the proper Woodchuck way, refusing to be tempted by Donald's encouragement to take shortcuts. Just a month later, they would be playing hooky from school. In a 1975 interview, Barks explained that he appreciated the mutability of the characters: "I began making them into sort of smart little guys once in a while, and very clumsy little guys at other times, and always, I aimed at surprise in each story so that nobody could pick up a comic book and say, 'Well, the nephews are going to behave thus and so.' They wouldn't know until they read the story just what those little guys were going to be up to in a particular sequence."

The Junior Woodchucks' Book of Knowledge was first mentioned in "The Secret of Atlantis" (Uncle Scrooge #5, March–May 1954). In the next issue's story, "Tralla La", the book made its first appearance as The Junior Woodchuck's Guidebook (Uncle Scrooge #6, June 1954). Historian Michael Barrier claims that the use of the Guidebook had a negative influence on the nephews' characterization, saying, "The Guidebook soon became something like a crutch. Faced with a dilemma, the nephews were more likely to rely on the Guidebook, seemingly a compendium of all human knowledge, than on their wits."

Barks introduced a female version of the Woodchucks — the Chickadees, featuring Daisy's nieces April, May and June — in "The Chickadee Challenge" (WDC&S #181, Oct 1955), headed by the stern Mrs. Ramrod. The Junior Woodchucks' official hound, often called General Snozzie, was added to the cast in "Dodging Miss Daisy" (WDC&S #213, June 1958).

The Junior Woodchucks had a backup feature for five years in Mickey Mouse, from issue #106 to 128 (April 1966 - Feb 1971), written by John Carey and drawn by Tony Strobl.

Gold Key Comics published a Huey, Dewey & Louie Junior Woodchucks comic starting in August 1966. The comic began as an annual, featuring stories by Strobl and writer Vic Lockman. In 1969, Barks — who had retired three years earlier — was prevailed upon to write some scripts in storyboard form for the comic, which became a quarterly. Under Barks, the stories came to focus on environmental themes. Other stories in the series were drawn by Jerry Siegel (co-creator of Superman) and Bob Gregory. The series ended with issue #81 in 1984.

In 1992, the Barks stories for the Junior Woodchucks title were redrawn by Dutch Disney comics artist Daan Jippes for Donald Duck Weekblad.

In 1993, Don Rosa published a memorable story about the history of the Junior Woodchucks Guidebook called "Guardians of the Lost Library", which was first published in the US in Uncle Scrooge Adventures #27 (July 1994).

== Junior Woodchucks' Guidebook ==
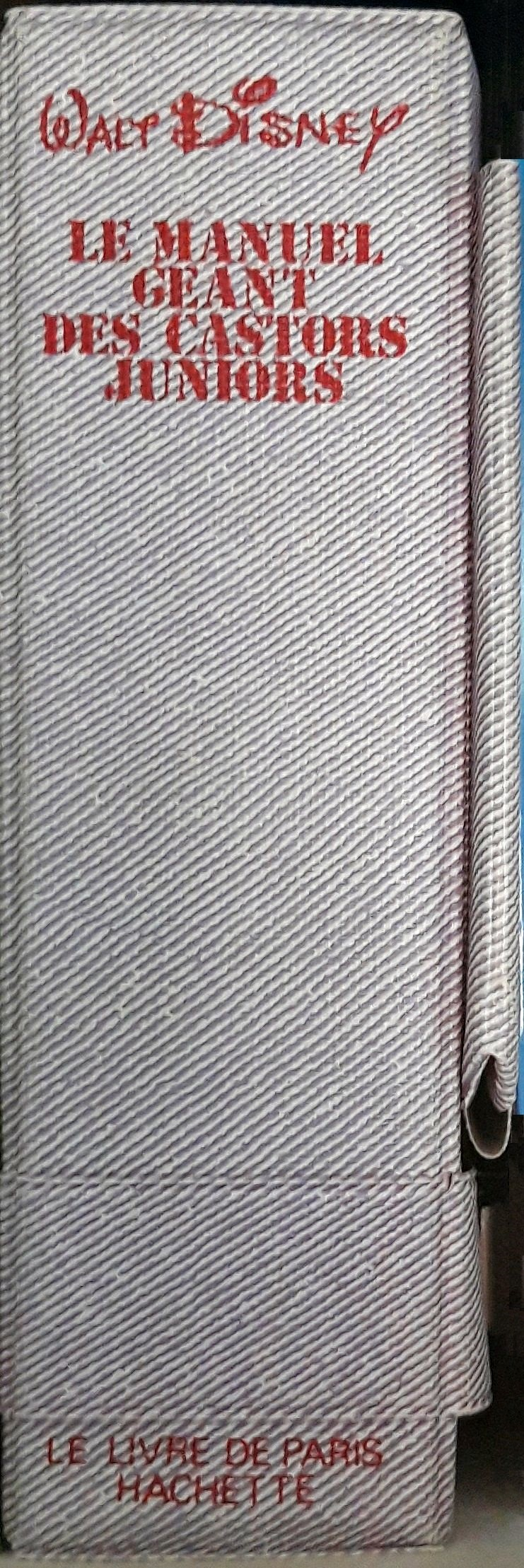
A 1976 French collection of Junior Woodchucks stories, published under the title of the Guidebook

The Junior Woodchucks' Guidebook and Reservoir of Inexhaustible Knowledge, or the Junior Woodchucks' Guidebook for short, appears to contain information and advice on every possible subject. Huey, Dewey, and Louie frequently consult a volume of the set to get themselves and their uncles Donald Duck and Scrooge McDuck out of dangerous situations (see deus ex machina). It was first mentioned in The Secret of Atlantis by Carl Barks in 1954, then called the Junior Woodchucks' Book of Knowledge. Its history was later discussed in Guardians of the Lost Library by Don Rosa in 1993.

According to cartoonist Don Rosa, this book was written by the Guardians of the lost Library of Alexandria, compiling the essence of knowledge that was unique to the Library. It was later found by Cornelius Coot who gave the book to his son Clinton Coot who, in turn, was inspired to form the Junior Woodchucks as a continuation of the Guardians of the Library. One story by Dutch writer Ruud Straatman says that the Guidebook is updated by an unknown author.

The Woodchuck book seems almost magical in its breadth of information; it almost never fails to provide the required information and yet is small enough to fit into a Junior Woodchuck's backpack. In particular, the Guidebook contains information on lost treasure, a complete survival guide, extensive historical and technical information and phrase books for various more or less common languages (like a minimal lizard phrase book), and many more. However, it does not contain information that a Junior Woodchuck is already supposed to know, such as the location of Cape of Good Hope, nor does it contain information on allegedly non-existent things. (In one episode of DuckTales, the three nephews faced a dragon and when they consulted the Guidebook, the entry on dragons read that, since dragons did not exist, there was no reason to include information on them; however, in the story on which that episode was based, the guidebook did have an entry on dragons. And, in a story which appeared in Uncle Scrooge entitled "The Golden Fleecing", the ducklings looked up the question how to put a dragon to sleep and found the answer, "Pull the wool over his eyes." On the other hand, the Guidebook does have information on Martian technology, despite the fact that in the DuckTales universe Martians had not been discovered when the book was printed. It is missing only one fact: the ranking order of the original Knights Templar, plus one discovered in an ancient Xanadu manuscript. In short, it is a minimal encyclopedia (although the subset of articles is extraordinarily well-chosen), available exclusively to Junior Woodchucks.

Information is readily available by searching the extensive index; the key skill of a Junior Woodchuck is retrieving information quickly from the Woodchuck book in the midst of a dangerous situation, such as a grizzly bear attack, an earthquake, falling out of an airplane sans parachute, or being swallowed alive by a crocodile. However, in Carl Barks' story "So Far and No Safari" (1966), it took the ducklings so long to look up a lifesaving question, it was almost too late. Scrooge subsequently offered to buy the Junior Woodchucks a better index for the Guidebook.

Just as the Junior Woodchucks are based on the Boy Scouts of America, their Guidebook is inspired by the Boy Scout Handbook. The real Handbook (at least in the 1950s) was the same size as the Guidebook and was believed by all Scouts to contain all necessary information. In this respect, the almost limitless and sometimes esoteric knowledge the Guidebook offers is a gently satirical comment on the "Scout Bible", as the original Scouting for Boys by Baden-Powell was sometimes known, the book giving advice on a vast range of subjects, including "Smoking", "How the Empire Must Be Held", "Courtesy to Women", and "How to Revive a Suicide".

That guide was the inspiration for the "Junior Woodchucks' Guidebook" (Il Manuale delle Giovani Marmotte), a series of several Disney books with tips, advice, general culture, and curious facts about nature and life, released in Italy by Mondadori in seven volumes between 1969 and 1974, and later translated into several languages.

== Fictional organization history ==
History of the Junior Woodchucks from "W.H.A.D.A.L.O.T.T.A.J.A.R.G.O.N." by Don Rosa (1997). (Edited image)

In the story "W.H.A.D.A.L.O.T.T.A.J.A.R.G.O.N." by Don Rosa the history of the Junior Woodchucks of the World begins with the Woodchuck Militia, a defensive army unit that was formed by Cornelius Coot in the early 19th century to protect Fort Duckburg from Native American warriors and other threats in the area. Clinton Coot, the son of Cornelius Coot, was the founder of the Junior Woodchucks as a Scouting organization for the children and teenagers around Duckburg at the time to uphold the ideals of performing good deeds, protection of the wilderness, rescuing of the innocent, meek & helpless, and the preservation of knowledge. The organization eventually grew larger to include all nations around the world. The first Junior Woodchucks were Grand Marshal Osborne and Exalted Overseer Taliaferro (a reference to Ted Osborn and Al Taliaferro) and Fulton Gearloose, the father of Gyro Gearloose.

In stories by other writers, other characters, such as Woodrow C. Woodchuck, Pioneer O'Duck, Cyrus P. Woodchuck, Daniel Boondock and Wadly Owlhoot have been named as being the founder of the Junior Woodchucks.

The Junior Woodchucks is a para-militaristic organization with its leadership being much more similar to that of army officers than to real-life Scoutmasters. The scouting groups are organized into troops which include titles such as Trooper, Lieutenant-General, Field Marshal and Ten-Star General. Alongside self-reliance, trust and honor are important to the Junior Woodchucks, as its members never lie, as for instance when Huey, Dewey and Louie promised the inhabitants of the sunken city of Atlantis to always keep their city's location secret from the outside world.

As the title of the Junior Woodchucks of the World suggest, it is an international organization and has troops across the globe, including Arabia (which consist of Desert Patrol nr. 646), Brazil (which consist of the Rio de Janeiro troops) and the Duckburg troops of the United States.

=== Leadership ===
The I.T.S.A.A.D.C.O.T.F.O.I.K., from Carl Barks' "The Chickadee Challenge" (1955)

The adult leadership of the Junior Woodchucks consists of troop commanders (called Grand Moguls in European comics) whom often has vibrantly acronymized titles which demonstrates their ranking position and professional field. They have also been called Generals in a few stories by Carl Barks. The troop commanders' uniforms are militaristic in design. They are often white or brown in color with richly decorated gold embroideries; with their headgear often being a woodchuck cap or other types of military headwear. They are also often wearing a lanyard, filled with a large number of elaborately meritorious medals, badges & ribbons which makes them look very dignified and grandiose, and in some cases exceedingly pompous. Only Junior Woodchucks can later become troop commanders.

Again, according to Don Rosa's story W.H.A.D.A.L.O.T.T.A.J.A.R.G.O.N. the Junior Woodchucks of the World is governed by the Supreme Council; which is probably part of the World Office of the Junior Woodchucks, the organization's top office. The council consists of nine high-ranking members whom collectively is called the B.I.G.S.H.O.T.S. (bureaucratic and imposing gathering of supreme high officials of the topmost strata) with the H.E.A.D.H.O.N.C.H.O. (highest executive administrator of divisional headquarters and organizer of nearly complete hierarchical overkill) as the head of the council. The Supreme Council is located in the Junior Woodchucks' World Headquarters in the City of Duckburg.

However, other high ranking titles of uncertain position in leadership has been used within the organization in stories by Carl Barks and others. Some of these include Commander-in-Chief and Exalted Grand Marshal.

A few other acronymized titles within the Junior Woodchucks' leadership include:

- (1955) G.U.C.O.T.R.O.I.S. (great, unopposable commandant of the realm of inextinguishale sagacity) and I.T.S.A.A.D.C.O.T.F.O.I.K. (international twelve-star admiral and deputy custodian of the fountain of inexhaustible knowledge), a very high ranking title which also seem to have some authority over the Littlest Chickadees patrol in the story The Chickadee Challenge (Walt Disney's Comics and Stories #181) written and drawn by Carl Barks, by declaring the bridge-building challenge between the two organisations as a tie; suggesting that the Littlest Chickadees is somehow part of or associated with the Junior Woodchuck of the World in some way.
- (1959) O.O.O.T.Q.F.U.E. (omnipotent overseer of the quest for unsurpassable excellence)
- (1964) O.G.U.F.O.O.L. (omnipotent giver of unimpeachably full-bodied observations on omniscient logic) and M.A.S.L.L.B.P.C.M. (admirable sachem of the long limousine and benevolent payer of the clubhouse mortgage)
- (1970) B.O.W.W.O.W. (be-strewer of well-padded wisdom, omniscience and whatever)
- (1970) H.I.S.S. and P.O.A.H.M. (hardheaded intuitive sagacity spreader and possessor of all his marbles)
- (1970) T.O.P.B.R.A.S.S. (thunderbolt of omniscient perspicacity and boss ramrod of abounding succor spreaders)
- (1971) J.A.W.B.O.N.E. (judicious, abstruse, wise bestower of neolithic edification) This title is held by the duckbill character Philodemus Gentlefogg of Duckburg Burrow Number 22, seen in The Junior Woodchucks story Let Sleeping Bones Lie (Uncle Scrooge #358).
- (1971) R.I.N.G.T.A.I.L.E.D. S.N.O.R.T.E.R. (radiant, illustrious, notable, glittering, topflight analytical instructor in logistical engineering dynamics and sharpeyed, nitpicking, overseer, recorder, tabulator and excuse rejecter)
- (1971) C.O.O.L.H.E.A.D. (calmer of outbreaks, outcries, lamentations, hassles, expostulations, animosity and disquietude)
- (1971) S.A.P.P.Y. P.A.P.P.Y. (stern advocator of peanut-picking yardmasterism and peerless abecedarian producer of praiseworthy youth)
- (1971) D.E.M.I.J.O.H.N. (dynamic earth-shacking molder of immaculate junk obliterators here and now)
- (1971) B.R.A.S.S. G.A.S.S.E.R. (brain rattling assigner of stupendous sweatouts and giver of awesome scathing scoldings and expurgatory roustings)
- (1971) O.D.D. B.A.L.L.E.R. (observer of devious doings and bestower of accolades and limitless laurels upon entitled recipients)
- (1971) T.A.I.L.C.R.A.N.K.E.R. (tempestuous assailer of indolent lackadaisicalness and case-hardened requiser of absolute nose-dipping, kowtowing, ear-cocking regimentationalism)
- (1972) I.R.O.N.H.E.A.R.T. (intrepid router of overblown nocturnal hobgoblins and exposer of addlepated rumormorgering taletellers)
- (1972) J.O.Y. K.I.L.L.E.R. (jaw-breaking order-yeller and intoner of leather-lunged lecturing, excoriating and rank-rattling)
- (1972) B.E.L.L.E.R.I.N.G. B.U.L.L.N.E.C.K. (bellicose expecter of limitless lionization, esteem, reverence and indefatigable, never-dying gung-ho as well as bedeviller of unskillful, lunkheaded lallygaggers, and nemesis of extemporizing campground know-nothings)
- (1972) H.I.S.T.O.R.Y.N.U.T. (hypercritical inquiring seeker into tales of old and rumors of yore, as well as noser-outer of unprovable tommyrot)
- (1972) G.U.F.F. S.P.O.U.T.E.R. (gentle, unflappable, friendly fellow and serene, peaceful, orderly, utterly tranquil example of reasonableness)
- (1972) T.U.B.B.A. B.L.U.B.B.E.R. (towering, unperturable, bell-whether of brobdingnagian adventures and belchfiring larruper of unsavory beachrats, buccaneers and ecology ravagers)
- (1972) H.O.T.S.H.O.O.T.E.R. (hawkeyed ogler of twigs, sprigs, herbs, oaks, truffles, thickets, eeelgrass and ragweeds)
- (1972) S.O.A.P. F.R.E.A.K. (stern overseer of aquatic peccadillos and fastidious rectifier of ecological abuse and knaveries)
- (1973) W.A.F.E.R. W.A.V.E.R. (whip-cracking achiever of frightfully efficient regimentation and wrathful arm-twisting vocalizer of expostulatory rake-downs)
- (1973) M.O.N.K.E.Y.S. U.N.C.L.E. (multifabolous overseer of noteworthy knot-tying, eagle-spying, yodel-crying and sock-drying as well as understander of nature and converser with lions and elks)
- (1973) S.L.A.C.K.E.R. W.H.A.C.K.E.R. (stentorian, law-spouting, adjudicating cracker of knobs and expounder of rules as well as watchdog, herdmaster, admiral, commodore, king, emperor and rip-roarer)
- (1973) S.M.O.G. D.O.G. (sufferocious measurer observer and gatherer od deleterious oxigen gunkups)
- (1973) T.R.O.O.P.E.R. P.O.O.P.E.R. (tempestuous requester of overblown obedience, perfection, enthusiasm and reliability as well as propounder of outrageously ostentatious programs, enterprises and razzledazzles)
- (1974) C.O.D.F.A.T.H.E.R. (ceremonialized oratorical discourser of fishes, alfalfa, toadstools, human, earwigs and/or rodents)

On few occasions Donald Duck has taken on the role as a troop commander (although in Don Rosa's story "W.H.A.D.A.L.O.T.T.A.J.A.R.G.O.N.", Donald is revealed to never having been allowed to join the Junior Woodchucks on account of his "hot temper"), or by Launchpad McQuack in the DuckTales TV series. In a large number of stories, including the last ones written by Carl Barks, the Duckburg troop commander is a tall duck, who is either the same character in every story with many different titles depending on the situation or separate characters. In some Italian stories the troop commander of the Duckburg troop is a tall, brave, strong, healthy and wise (but scared of flight) goose whose name is Bertie McGoose.

=== Troops ===
Huey, Dewey and Louie as Ten Star Generals, from Carl Barks' story "Ten-Star Generals" (1951)

To become a full member of the Junior Woodchucks and be assigned to a local troop one must first enlist as cadets, who wears woodchuck caps, and pass the initiation test that proves one's intelligence and resourcefulness. After one has passed this test and become a full member, the headgear of the uniform consist of a backtail woodchuck cap and for higher-ranking members; the Exalted Hightail woodchuck cap. Within the troops there is also leadership titles inspired by the army, in which Major seems to be the lowest rank followed by higher ranking titles like Ten-Star General; which is one grade below Exalted Hightail. Don Rosa has written that One-Hundred-Star General is the highest title in the Junior Woodchucks; after which promotees can proceed to earn titles above the highest ranks. Recipients can issue orders to lower ranking members. To earn titles and get promotions in rank, one will have to pass tests or missions of which there is a vast number and in various fields. These include outdoors and survival skills, science and environmental protection etc. With these promotions, Junior Woodchucks will receive a large number of elaborately honorific medals, badges & ribbons in the specific field that one has mastered. All the different troops also has its own lodge as a base of operation and for gatherings. The most prestigious troop to belong to was the Duckburg Troop No. 1, as it was the first to be created during the time of Clinton Coot and it only admitted high-ranking members from other local troops.

The best known members of the Duckburg Troop Nr. 1 consist of:

- Ten-Star Generals/ Exalted Hightails, Commandants of the Hightails' Hall of Heroes, Chevaliers of the Honor Guard (etc.) Huey, Dewey and Louie Duck
- Field Marshal Fox
- Trooper Hogg, a character together with Field Marshal Fox most often appears in Carl Barks' later Junior Woodchucks stories and also in the modern stories by later writers and artists.
- Lieutenant-General Holsworthy Hog, appears in Gladstone's Usual Very Good Year (Walt Disney's Comics and Stories #136), by Carl Barks.

=== General Snozzie ===
General Snozzie is the Official Hound of the Junior Woodchucks and was created by Carl Barks in his story Dodging Miss Daisy from 1958. General Snozzie is a bloodhound occasionally deployed by the Junior Woodchucks during tests or missions and he has many skills but his main attribute and discipline is his extraordinary, and at times incomprehensibly, good scent tracking. He also has a number of acronymized titles which include:Ph.D., B.Sc., Ed.D. and D.O.G. (doctor of odd-ball gimmickry) and G.C.O.T.O.O.M. (grand commander of the order of mercury)(1961), S.L.O.B. (simple, lowdown, ordinary boobhound), S.S.S.S. and S.O.S.S. (supremely sagacious spoor sniffer and saver of stranded souls)(1962), K.I.N.G. (knightly, intrepid, natatorial guardian) working for points to earn a B.T.H.H.M. (bucket to hold his medals) and G.P.O.O.T.K.H. (great peerless overseer of the kitchen help)(1963).

== The Littlest Chickadees ==
The Littlest Chickadees, sometimes also called the Chickadee Patrols, are female counterparts to the Junior Woodchucks. The Chickadees first appeared in "The Chickadee Challenge," a Carl Barks Donald Duck story in Walt Disney's Comics and Stories #161 (1954). The Chickadees' Duckburg patrol is led by a brawny woman named Captain Ramrod. Daisy Duck's nieces April, May, and June are members of the Chickadees. The Chickadees are named after the chickadee, a species of small bird; the phrase "littlest chickadee" also suggests "my little chickadee", a term of endearment classically used by W. C. Fields.

The Chickadee Patrols are based to some extent on the Girl Scouts of the USA and the Campfire Girls. In the spirit of friendly rivalry, the Duckburg Troops of the Littlest Chickadees and Junior Woodchucks once held a bridge-building competition, which ended in a tie.

Carl Barks wrote a poem which mentions the rivalry between the two groups:

The world is full of clans and cults
Abuzz as angry bees
And Junior Woodchucks snapping jeers
At Littlest Chickadees

== The Little Booneheads ==
The Little Booneheads is another Scouting organization alongside the Junior Woodchucks, first mentioned in Ten-Stars Generals (Walt Disney's Comics and Stories #132, 1951) by Carl Barks. They are however often depicted to be much less self-sufficient, and at times even negligent, in their outdoors and survival skills in contrast to the high standards of the Junior Woodchucks. In the Little Booneheads first appearance, it was revealed that Donald Duck was a former member, and thanks to the organization's inferior training, Donald is often getting into trouble for practicing them again. Alongside being a pun of the term "bonehead", the Little Booneheads is also a reference to the pioneer and explorer Daniel Boone; as Donald proclaims: "We had heads like Daniel Boone!".

== List of comics ==
- Walt Disney's Comics & Stories (1940) (Dell)
- Walt Disney's Christmas Parade (1949) (Dell)
- Donald Duck (1952) (Dell)
- Mickey Mouse (1952) (Dell)
- Uncle Scrooge (1953) (Dell)
- Beagle Boys (1964) (Gold Key)
- Huey, Dewey and Louie: Junior Woodchucks (1966) (Gold Key)
- Chip 'n' Dale (1967) (Gold Key)
- Walt Disney Comics Digest (1968) (Gold Key)
- Walt Disney Daisy and Donald (1973) (Gold Key)
- Donald Duck Adventures (1987, 1990) (Gladstone and Disney Only)
- Uncle Scrooge Adventures (1987) (Gladstone)
- Disney's DuckTales (1988) (Gladstone)
- Disney's DuckTales (1990) (Disney)
- Walt Disney's Autumn Adventures (1990) (Disney)
- Disney's Colossal Comics Collection (1991) (Disney)
- Walt Disney's Junior Woodchucks (1991) (Disney)
- Disney's Darkwing Duck (1991) (Disney)
- Uncle Scrooge: The Hunt For The Old Number One (2010) (Boom! Studios)
- Disney's DuckTales: Rightful Owners (2011) (Boom! Studios)

== In animation ==
=== Early prototype ===
Huey, Dewey and Louie first appeared as scouts in the 1938 animated short, Good Scouts, written by Carl Barks. Here, the first prototype of a scouting uniform for the boys was designed, based on early Boy Scout uniforms. The uniforms from this time resembled National Park Service uniforms, with park ranger style hats, as seen in the film. The film did not show the trio wearing coonskin caps, a style that became popular with boys in the 1950s, nor mention a scouting organization that they belonged to. Donald acts like a wilderness know-it-all, yet keeps goofing up, as in numerous Woodchuck stories. The uniforms were introduced to the Donald Duck comic strip by Al Taliaferro and Bob Karp from model sheets while the film's production was wrapping up. Thus, the first appearance of the boys in scout uniforms was introduced in the comics three months before the animated release.

=== DuckTales ===
The Junior Woodchucks and their guidebook were a frequent plot element in the original DuckTales animated series.

In the 2017 DuckTales reboot, Huey is the only nephew who is a member of the Junior Woodchucks. Though it sometimes feeds into his vices of overplanning and hunger for approval, he is an enthusiastic scout. he has earned multiple merit badges and keeps his copy of the guidebook under his cap, adding new entries to it as he encounters various supernatural entities or artifacts. Launchpad McQuack also serves as a Junior Woodchuck scoutmaster. Other Junior Woodchucks include Violet Sabrewing, Doofus Drake, and B.O.Y.D., while former Woodchucks include Fethry Duck, Della Duck, and Donald Duck, though Donald was kicked out because he has a "bad attitude towards nature". In season three, it is revealed that this iteration of the Junior Woodchucks was founded by renowned adventurer Isabella Finch and her grandson Bradford Buzzard, founder and director of F.O.W.L., was the first Woodchuck.

== International versions ==
- Czech: Mladí svišti - similarly to the Italian version below, "svišť" refers to marmots rather than woodchucks.
- Danish: Grønspætterne
- Dutch: Jonge woudlopers - literally "young woodwalkers"
- Estonian: Noorpiilurid
- Finnish: Sudenpennut - "Wolfcubs"
- French : Castors Juniors - junior beavers
- German: Fähnlein Fieselschweif
- Greek: Οι Μικροί Εξερευνητές
- Icelandic: Grænjaxlarnir
- Indonesian: Pramuka Siaga
- Italian: Giovani Marmotte - this translates literally as "young marmots": marmots are a ground-living, burrowing rodent, similar to a groundhog, and famous for whistling
- Norwegian: Hakkespettene - literally "Woodpeckers"
- Polish: Młodzi Skauci - literally "young scouts", referring to the Scouting movement
- Portuguese: Escoteiros-Mirins (Brazil), Escuteiros-Mirins (Portugal)
- Russian: Юные Сурки
- Spanish: Cortapalos or Jóvenes Castores
- Slovenian: Mladi taborniki - literally "young scouts", referring to the national (secular) Scouting movement taborniki.
- Swedish: Gröngölingspatrullen
- Hungarian: Ifjú Mormoták
- Lithuanian: Jaunieji Švilpikai

== Cultural impact ==
In the 1970s Bob Rozakis called his fellow young fans turned DC Comics editorial employees Junior Woodchucks and they referred to themselves as such in the pages of the pro-zine The Amazing World of DC Comics which they co-edited.

Comedian Jeff Foxworthy once claimed, in his TV show, to have been a member of the Junior Woodchucks in his childhood.

In Season 9, Episode 12 of original Night Court, titled, "A Shave and a Haircut" (at timestamp 8:40-8:50), Mel Torme accepts a "Junior Woodchuck of the Year Award" from two young boys in scouting gear. When he says goodbye to them he refers to them as "Two, with it, chuck-a-duck ducks." Which might be a further hint at the Woodchuck's Donald Duck origin.

In some episodes of the comic strip Big Nate, Nate Wright and his middle-school friends are members of the Junior Woodchucks.

In the 2012 Former Fat Boys song "Snakes on a Plane 2: Sharks on a Rollercoaster", the lyric "Junior Woodchuck for life" is present and can be heard at the 1:54 second mark (3:00 mark if listening to the version with the intro included).

== See also ==
- Huey, Dewey, and Louie
- Donald Duck universe
- Disney comics
