= The Last Lord of Eldorado =

- German cover art. Art by Don Rosa.
- Story code: D 96066
- Story: Don Rosa
- Ink: Don Rosa
- Hero: Scrooge McDuck
- Pages: 30
- Layout: 4 rows per page
- Appearances: Scrooge McDuck; Donald Duck; Huey, Dewey, and Louie; Flintheart Glomgold
- First publication: 1998

"The Last Lord of Eldorado" is a 1998 Donald Duck comic story by Don Rosa.

The story was first published in the Danish Anders And & Co. #1998–06; the first American publication was in Uncle Scrooge #311, in July 1998.

== Plot ==
The story continues directly from Rosa's earlier story "Treasure under Glass". Recently having found a map of all sunken treasure ships in the 17th century, Scrooge McDuck, Donald Duck, and his nephews are retrieving treasures from them. From a sunken ship named Dukatenesel, Donald obtains a golden plaque commemorating the founding of an Augsburgian Welser consortium in New Granada on February 21, 1539. This intrigues Scrooge, so he, Donald, and the boys head off to Germany to find out more.

In Germany, the Ducks head to Nuremberg, where they meet with the banking company that currently owns the remains of the bank founded in New Granada around 1539. As Scrooge buys the remains of the bank at a price of $1,000, the director of the banking company explains that the Welser bank still has a branch office somewhere in Latin America, but its exact location has been lost. As the Ducks leave, the director telephones the company's owner, Flintheart Glomgold. Eager to find out what Scrooge is up to, Glomgold catches the first plane from South Africa to Germany and arrives in Nuremberg to spy on the ducks.

All that remains of the Welser bank is a safe deposit box containing the bank's documents. The adventurers study the documents, finding out that the bank was founded by Gonzalo Jiménez de Quesada, Nicolaus Federmann, and Sebastián de Belalcázar, who had met each other at the Cundinamarca Plateau Plateau in Omagua and made a contract with each other. When Huey, Dewey, and Louie tell Scrooge that Omagua is also known as Eldorado, Scrooge becomes interested in finding this lost place. The boys' Junior Woodchucks Guidebook tells them that the documents confirming the ownership of Eldorado were given to a monastery in Bogotá, Colombia, so the Ducks decide that they should head there next. Unknown to them, Glomgold has been spying on them all this time, disguised as a waitress, so he decides to follow them to Bogotá.

When the Ducks reach the monastery on the Cundinamarca Plateau, the abbess tells them that their archives are off-limits to outsiders, due to the theft of the golden plaque in 1580 which was perpetrated by the monastery's founder, and the nuns haven't trusted outsiders ever since. Scrooge hands the abbess the very golden plaque he holds and she graciously grants the Ducks permission to visit the archives.

In the archives, the Ducks find the original contract signed by de Quesáda, Federmann, and de Belalcázar, but Glomgold, disguised as a nun, immediately steals it before running off. Donald recognizes Glomgold and runs after him. Glomgold runs across an old bridge over a deep chasm, and once he has reached the other side, he cuts the bridge off, leaving Donald stranded in the middle. Fortunately, Donald is soon rescued and the contract is now in Scrooge's hands, so the Ducks have time to study it in peace and are able to find the lost location of Eldorado.

The Ducks rent a bulldozer and load it onto a truck similar to the one featured in The Wages of Fear, which they drive in search of Eldorado. They meet a tour guide, but when they ask him for help, he claims that Eldorado is just a fairy tale, so the Ducks head off in search of Eldorado on their own. Glomgold follows them and, to sabotage their journey, drops a large boulder behind their truck, which starts to roll, so Donald has to drive incredibly fast to escape it. Finally they arrive at Lake Teusacá, where the plaque they found at the start of the story claimed Eldorado was located. Their truck snaps in half, but the bulldozer is intact, so Scrooge digs the ground and drains the entire lake but finds nothing but stinky mud. Glomgold catches up with the Ducks, disguised as a Colombian native, and asks Scrooge to sell the bank back to its original owner, but Scrooge easily sees through the disguise. They still find nothing after digging the mud, but Huey, Dewey, and Louie figure out that the treasure must be hidden somewhere else, so they head out to search for it. Eventually, they stumble on a large boulder with the imprint of the golden plaque they found at the start of the adventure, and deduce that the densely grown forest in the valley beneath it must once have been a lake, but Jiménez de Quesáda drained the lake and grew a forest instead to hide the location of the treasure. Unfortunately, Glomgold has also stumbled on the treasure. He ties up the boys to prevent them from reaching Scrooge with the news.

In the meantime, Scrooge's digging has caused the rock faces surrounding the lake to become dangerously unstable. Oblivious to this, Scrooge and Glomgold argue about the ownership of the bank, so Donald has to find his missing nephews alone. He releases them from their bonds and together they head back to the lake bottom, where they rescue Scrooge and Glomgold (still in the middle of arguing) from an impending collapse. Scrooge sells the bank back to Glomgold at the last moment before the rock face collapses, revealing untold riches hidden beneath the bottom of the forest the boys had found. Glomgold thinks he has won all these riches for himself, but Scrooge tells him that he only sold him back the bank - the riches are a deposit belonging to an account holder, namely Scrooge himself, and as Glomgold's bank hasn't paid any interest to the account in 469 years, Glomgold basically owes Scrooge everything he owns and will ever earn in his lifetime.

However, Scrooge's joy is cut short when two Colombian tax inspectors arrive, and inform him that since the bank never paid any taxes to the Colombian state since the death of Quesáda in 1579, it and all its deposits were surrendered to the state in 1637, over 300 years ago, so neither Scrooge nor Glomgold has any claim to any of the riches.

Scrooge takes the loss philosophically, since he is allowed to keep the deed as a souvenir, plus the memory of the moment when Glomgold thought he owed Scrooge all the money in the world. Finally Scrooge tricks a Colombian tourist guide into selling Glomgold a map to the lost treasure of the Inca, which they had already found in Rosa's earlier story The Son of the Sun, driving Glomgold mad, to Scrooge's amusement.

== See also ==
- El Dorado
- "The Gilded Man"
