= The Menehune Mystery =

1953-1954 Disney comic

- Story code: W US 4-02
- Story: Carl Barks
- Ink: Carl Barks
- Date: December 1953-February 1954
- Hero: Uncle Scrooge
- Pages: 32
- Layout: 4 rows per page
- Appearances: Donald Duck; Huey, Dewey and Louie; Beagle Boys
- First publication: Uncle Scrooge #4

"The Menehune Mystery" is a 32-page Disney comics story written and drawn by Carl Barks, and lettered by his wife Garé Barks. Mrs. Barks had grown up in Hawaii and suggested elements of the story to her husband. "Menehune" was first published in Uncle Scrooge #4 (December 1953-February 1954). Characters in the story include Donald Duck, his nephews Huey, Dewey, and Louie, the Beagle Boys, and Uncle Scrooge. The story has been reprinted many times.

== Plot ==
Uncle Scrooge is concerned about the safety and security of his fortune. He has reduced his fortune to $1,000,000 bills and has the bills canned like spinach. Scrooge wants to ship the load to a remote island near Hawaii, but the Beagle Boys take over the ship and force Scrooge, Donald, and the nephews to do the dirty work on the voyage. Once in Hawaii, the Ducks are helped by the Menehunes, and the Beagle Boys are captured by the United States Navy.

== See also ==
- List of Disney comics by Carl Barks
