= The Fabulous Philosopher's Stone =

- Story code: W US 10-02
- Story: Carl Barks
- Ink: Carl Barks
- Date: October 28, 1954
- Hero: Scrooge McDuck
- Pages: 24
- Layout: 4 rows per page
- Appearances: Scrooge McDuck; Donald Duck; Huey, Dewey and Louie; Monsieur Mattressface (debut)
- First publication: Uncle Scrooge #10; June 1955

"The Fabulous Philosopher's Stone" is an Uncle Scrooge comics story written and drawn by Carl Barks in October 1954. The story was first published in Uncle Scrooge #10 (June 1955).

== Plot ==
Scrooge McDuck takes Donald Duck and his three grandnephews on an expedition to find the Philosopher's Stone, a mythical artifact that would turn common metals into gold. The stone is eventually found, and works. But it has some rather unpleasant side effects.

Scrooge is eventually forced to give up the stone and gives it to Monsieur Mattressface of the International Money Council.

== Changes made in reprints ==
In this story, Scrooge refers to the year 1110 as "845 years ago". When the story was reprinted in Uncle Scrooge #253 (April 1991), the reference was changed to "881 years ago".

== Sequels ==
The International Money Council and Monsieur Mattressface later appeared in The Crown of the Crusader Kings (2001) and The Old Castle's Other Secret (2004) by Don Rosa.

== See also ==
- List of Disney comics by Carl Barks
