= Tralla La =

1953 comic book story

- Cover of Uncle Scrooge #6, June 1954.
- Story code: W US 6-02
- Story: Carl Barks
- Ink: Carl Barks
- Date: October 29, 1953
- Hero: Scrooge McDuck
- Pages: 22
- Layout: 4 rows per page
- Appearances: Scrooge McDuck; Donald Duck; Huey, Dewey, and Louie
- First publication: June 1954

"Tralla La" is a Scrooge McDuck comic book story by Carl Barks. The story was first published in Uncle Scrooge #6 (June, 1954). In the story, Scrooge searches for a utopia in which money plays no role.

== Plot ==
"Tralla La" begins with Uncle Scrooge having a hard day at his office, and it doesn't get better when he attempts to walk along the street to relax; everyone he meets wants some of his money. The stress of this way of life gets to him and he suffers a nervous breakdown. Though he improves, he can't stand to see or hear about money, as he now associates it with all the troubles that got him to this point. In order to heal, he searches for a place where money has no influence. Tralla La may be such a place, where a peaceful society without a monetary system is rumored to exist.

Scrooge and his nephews, who are there to support his healing, finally locate the mythical place in a deep valley high in the Himalayas and arrive by parachute. There, they get acquainted with a more peaceful existence than to which they were accustomed.

However, as Scrooge seems to be healing, he doesn't realize he brought his troubles with him. He brought bottles of his medication along. The bottle caps he discards are considered rare treasures in Tralla La and become the basis of a new monetary system. The inhabitants of Tralla La become obsessed with these new treasures. To solve the issue, Scrooge has planes drop one billion bottle caps, but this becomes too many, and the inhabitants become angry, as their fields are now covered with caps. The Ducks must flee, as they apparently cannot find peace even in an Earthly paradise.

== Production ==
In a 1981 interview, Barks said, "The nerve medicine [in Tralla La] was a running gag to help pull parts of the story together. I had learned about running gags before I ever worked at Disney. It was a kind of thread or connecting link in stories, such as Wodehouse's stories, and in the movies: Chaplin and Laurel and Hardy had running gags. I liked those movies more than romantic ones or shoot-'em-up westerns. The running gags were a necessary part of the stories, like a period at the end of a sentence."

== Analysis ==
A number of previous stories by Barks presented Scrooge's way of life as rather stressful, but this is the first story where this seems to be getting on his nerves. This is certainly not the last, but subsequent stories rarely focus on it.

Scrooge's effort this time is not to gain treasure, but find some peace and regain his health. However, as so often presented in Barks tales, in trying to escape his problems he only manages to carry them with him. Tralla La's (based on Shangri-La) inhabitants prove to share the human characteristic of greed, while Barks is allowed some bitter commentary on human nature and the impact of "inventing" money.

The theme of never finding peace no matter how hard the characters try is a running theme in Barks' tales, but here it takes center place. It is considered among Barks' most memorable because of its view of humanity, paradise, and the vulnerability of his characters.

This story features the first appearance of that inexhaustible font of knowledge, The Junior Woodchucks' Guidebook.

The story was later adapted into an episode of DuckTales.

Don Rosa wrote a sequel to the story, Return To Xanadu, in which Tralla La is revealed to be the valley of Xanadu. Return to Xanadu was first published in the United States in Uncle Scrooge #261-262 (October–November 1991) and reprinted in #357 (September, 2006).

== See also ==
- List of Disney comics by Carl Barks
