= W.H.A.D.A.L.O.T.T.A.J.A.R.G.O.N. =

1997 Donald Duck story by Don Rosa

- Story code: D 97052
- Story: Don Rosa
- Ink: Don Rosa
- Hero: Huey, Dewey and Louie
- Pages: 16
- Layout: 4 rows per page
- Appearances: Huey, Dewey and Louie; Donald Duck; Scrooge McDuck; The Junior Woodchucks; The Junior Woodchuck's Official Hound; Grandma Duck
- First publication: 10 October 1997

"W.H.A.D.A.L.O.T.T.A.J.A.R.G.O.N." is a 1997 Donald Duck story by Don Rosa. This story was originally made to celebrate the 60th anniversary of Huey, Dewey and Louie's first appearance in a newspaper comic strip drawn by Al Taliaferro.

The story's title can be read as whada lotta jargon (what a lot of jargon), but is also an acronym that stands for When Huey And Dewey And Louie Originally Thought To Adopt Junior-Woodchuck Attitudes, Regulations, and Grandiose Organizational Nomenclature.

The story was first published in the Danish Anders And & Co. #1997-42; the first American publication was in Uncle Scrooge #309, in May 1998.

== Plot ==
The story explains how Donald's three nephews originally joined the Junior Woodchucks. Years ago, when the boys were still very small, they were up to so much mischief that Donald finally got fed up with it and decided that something must be done. By chance, he ran across a scout group of the Junior Woodchucks, and this inspired him to send his nephews to join the organization.

At the annual grand jamboree of the Junior Woodchucks, the boys discovered that their own great-grandmother is the daughter of the organization's founder. Thus interested, the boys wanted to join the Junior Woodchucks immediately. The chiefs originally didn't want to accept them, but when they learned they were the great-great-grandchildren of their original founder, they accepted them immediately. They never had descendants of their founder before, even though Huey, Dewey, and Louie weren't the first ones to try. Donald had also tried to join them, but was rejected because of his bad temper.

As novices in the Junior Woodchucks, the boys' first task was to find the remains of the Fort Duckburg, which was demolished to make room for Scrooge McDuck's Money Bin. The trail led the boys, accompanied by Major Snozzie, to a wood pulp factory owned by Scrooge, where the logs from the fortress were about to be made into pulp. But when the worker responsible for the pulp making learned of the logs' origin, as a former Junior Woodchuck himself, he immediately stopped the machines to avoid destroying the historical remains.

The story ends with the boys being promoted to full members of the Junior Woodchucks and Donald being awarded an honorary medal.
