= Treasure under Glass =

1991 Donald Duck comic book story by Don Rosa

- Story: Don Rosa
- Ink: Don Rosa
- Hero: Scrooge McDuck
- Pages: 30
- Layout: 4 rows per page
- Appearances: Scrooge McDuck; Donald Duck; Huey, Dewey, and Louie
- First publication: 1991

"Treasure under Glass" is a 1991 Uncle Scrooge comic story by Don Rosa.

The story was first published in the Danish Anders And Ekstra #1991-02; the first American publication was in Uncle Scrooge #263, in February 1992.

== Plot ==
Scrooge and his nephews are on a schooner in the Florida Keys, scouting for sunken treasure ships. During their conversation, Donald is surprised to hear from Scrooge that the Spanish Empire also mounted treasure-hunting expeditions (as Scrooge wryly says: "You don't suppose that when a ship packed with gold sank, they just forgot about it?"). In those days, the wrecks were easy to find in the relatively shallow waters of the Keys — since they had not yet been covered by ocean subsidence or algae, nor had their hulls decomposed — but the Spaniards were unable to retrieve any of the treasure, for lack of diving equipment. The Spaniards made detailed maps of the wreck sites, but these were all lost in 1655 (during the Caribbean phase of the Anglo-Spanish War).

Unfortunately for the Ducks, two pirates have been watching them and decide to eliminate the competition. While scouting the sea bottom, Donald, Huey, Dewey, and Louie are menaced by sharks attracted by meat chunks dropped by the pirates, and duck under a shelf of rock that turns out to be the lip of an Imperial-era diving bell. When they bring the bell up, Scrooge recognizes the name engraved on the side: Candelaria, the flagship of Francisco Núñez Melián's salvage fleet. The Ducks decide to use the diving bell to allow them to get past the sharks.

The bell leads them to the wreck, where they find a wall-mounted map with all the treasure sites clearly marked. Unfortunately, the map is covered with algae and so fragile that trying to clear the map away would cause it to crumble. For the same reason, the chart cannot be removed from the wreck intact.

Donald comes up with an unusually (for him) ingenious idea: Scrooge commissions the making of an enormous glass dome from glass blowers in Key West, large enough to cover the entire wreck. The dome is lowered into the sea by helicopter, upended over the wreck, staked to the sea floor, and slowly pumped full of air to remove the water. Now that the map is dry, Donald and his nephews are able to brush the moss away, and photograph the entire map in detail.

However, the two pirates return and board the schooner, tie up Scrooge, lower themselves to the wreck in the diving bell, and relieve the ducks of the camera at gunpoint. While this has been going on, the stakes holding the dome in place have been pulling free, and eventually the dome rockets out of the ocean. The rush of water into the vented dome destroys the Candelaria, and forces Donald and his nephews to swim to the surface without their diving gear.

They free Scrooge from the schooner, but he starts berating Donald for the loss of the map data. Then they hear shouts for help coming from a "hole in the ocean", and motor their way to the dome, which is floating open-end up. Trapped at the bottom of the dome are the pirates, who accidentally motored their getaway skiff into it.

The pirates are arrested, and the camera is returned to Scrooge, containing information that will lead them to millions in sunken treasure. Donald demands that he deserves something extra for his innovative idea and the danger he and his nephews faced. Scrooge, examining photos from the camera taken earlier in the week, agrees that Donald deserves something extra and tells Donald to hold out his hand. Huey sees the picture — Donald sticking out his tongue at Scrooge behind his back — as Scrooge lashes Donald's palm with his cane, leaving an angry red mark.

The story line is continued in Rosa's subsequent story The Last Lord of Eldorado.

== See also ==
- "Treasure under Glass" served as the title story to Fantagraphics Uncle Scrooge and Donald Duck: The Don Rosa Library Vol. 3
