= The Golden River (comics) =

Comic book series

- Story code: W US 22-02
- Story: Carl Barks
- Ink: Carl Barks
- Date: November 21, 1957
- Hero: Uncle Scrooge
- Pages: 26
- Layout: 3 rows per page
- Appearances: Uncle Scrooge; Donald Duck; Huey, Dewey and Louie
- First publication: Uncle Scrooge #22

"The Golden River" is a Disney comics story written and drawn by Carl Barks in 1957 and first published in 1958, in Uncle Scrooge #22 (Dell Comics, June 1958). It is somewhat based on the fairy tale The King of the Golden River, by John Ruskin.

== Plot ==
the first page of "The Golden River"

Scrooge McDuck is on the verge of a nervous breakdown due to the dry climate causing the banknotes in his Money Bin to shrink, resulting in the overall money level inside the bin decreasing. This makes him feel poorer and he begins to act more and more like a miser.

At this point, Donald Duck and his nephews arrive and ask him for a donation to help fund a club for children. Scrooge throws them away to the streets (through a concealed scaffold), and rebuts further attempts from Donald to get the donation by exposing Scrooge as a tightwad. However, when his three nephews learn from Scrooge's staff the real reason of his bad mood, they try to solve his problem by suggesting to him to blow hot air into the money pile. Scrooge gladly accepts the suggestion and states that he will give them the donation if their plan works out. Unfortunately, too much air is blown, causing the Money Bin to crack open. Scrooge collapses after hearing about the repair expenses (and an untimely comment about the promised donation) and is forced by his doctor to go on vacations.

Next, the ducks find themselves in a remote cabin in a valley, close to a small waterfall, where Scrooge is supposed to relax under the watch of his nephews. One of the ducklings starts reading to him The King of the Golden River, which Scrooge scorns as an alienating fairy tale, stating that only hard work brings fortune (one of his main beliefs), not fantastic beings. As an example, he tells them that when he was young, he used to collect firewood so he could sell it to rich people at exorbitant prices. Suddenly, the nearby waterfall seems to have turned into a gold flow (like in the fairy tale). However, when the ducks reach it, they realize it's just plain water. Scrooge again turns grumpy and returns to the cabin, whilst the ducks decide to investigate further.

Donald and his nephews climb to the top of the waterfall where they find a hot spring by the shore, which issues not only hot water but also gold powder into the stream, which caused the "golden waterfall" effect. As they cannot claim the gold for themselves (as the whole area is owned by Scrooge), they instead learn how to control it and decide to use this artifice to obtain a donation from Scrooge.

Using a hollow log as a megaphone to amplify their voices, they convince Scrooge that a magic gnome controls the golden flow, and that Scrooge must be generous to the needy in order to deserve the gold. Scrooge, completely convinced, starts looking for strangers to be generous with, only finding a disguised Donald asking for the sum equivalent to the promised donation. Several funny situations follow, including a flow of frogs down the waterfall into a hopeful Scrooge holding a pan, when the ducks are unable to open the gold flow into the stream.

While the ducks realize they might have rendered the hot spring useless by their attempts to control it and lose their hope to swindle Scrooge, he quietly reflects that his attempts on generosity were not sincere but a "bribe" to the gnome in order to obtain profit from the golden river. He then sees one of the ducklings catching firewood (just like he used to do as a child), and touched by this scene he runs to him and states to the stunned duck family that he will build the club himself, instead of just donating a small sum. At this moment, to the surprise of all (but Scrooge) the waterfall starts to pour gold again. As the nephews race into it with pans, trying to explain Scrooge about the physics of the phenomenon, he calmly states that he believes (opposite to his former cynic and logic behavior) the gold stream to be controlled by the Gnome King, who will keep it flowing as long as he is generous to children.

== See also ==
- List of Disney comics by Carl Barks
