= National Park Service uniforms =

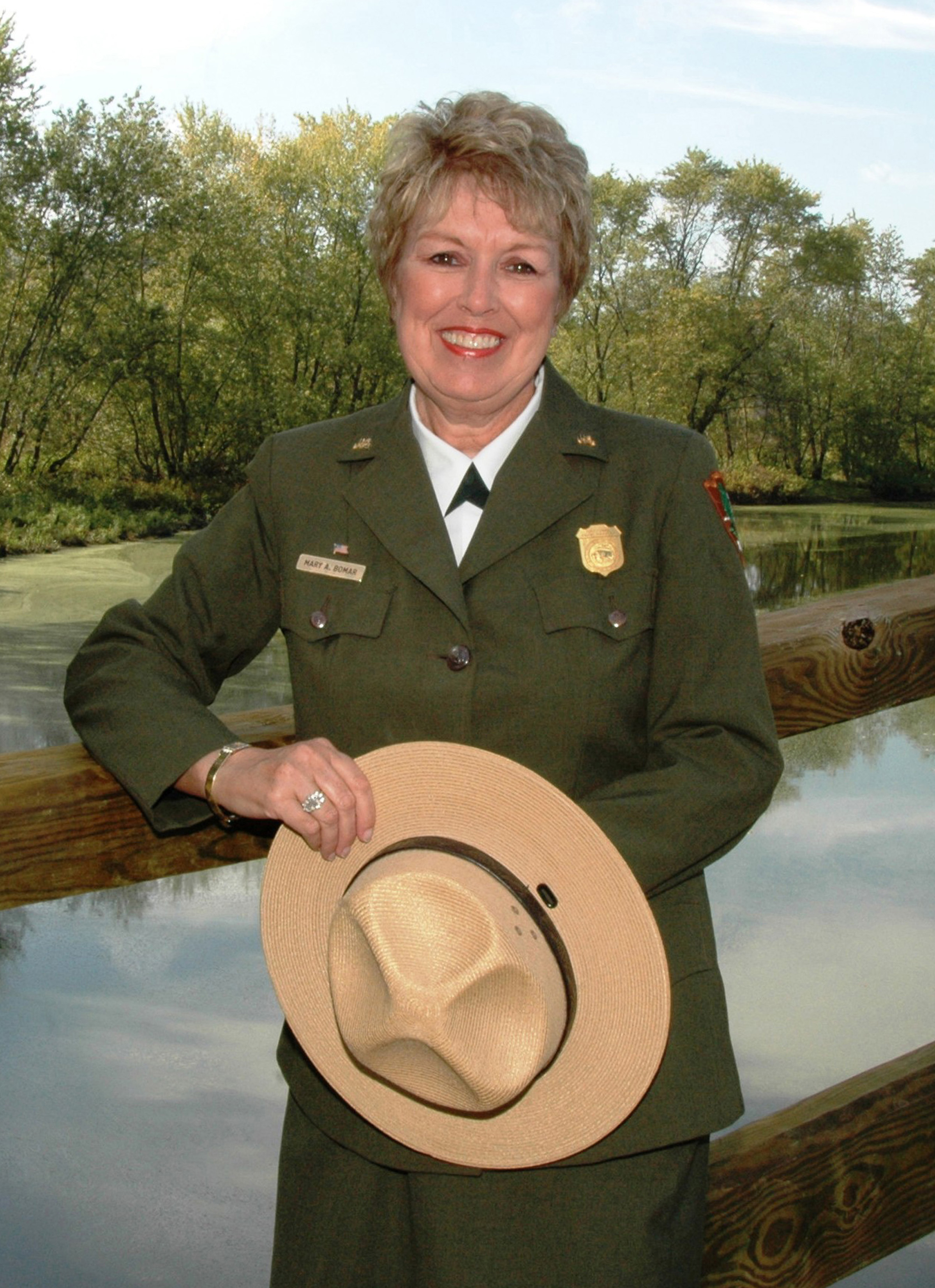

The United States National Park Service, often referred to as the USNPS or NPS, is run by the United States Department of Interior and is charged with protecting, preserving, and interpreting the nation's national parks. While the first national park, Yellowstone, was created in 1872, the National Park Service has only existed since 1916. There was no unifying dress for park officials until the United States Army Cavalry took over the protection of the parks in 1886. For nearly a century since it was officially established, the USNPS underwent several major uniform changes, although several items, such as the distinctive campaign hat, are carry-overs from the early days. Eventually, the uniform became the gray shirt and green trousers that can be seen on NPS Rangers today.

== Early dress: 1872 to 1886 ==
During the early years of national parks (1870s and 1880s), before there was such an organization as the United States National Park Service, there was no specific unifying dress code for employees. The man credited with being the first park ranger, Harry Yount, wore clothing typical of the late 19th century outdoorsmen. Civilian shirts and wide brimmed hats were mixed and matched with a U.S. Army coat, knee boots, and a variety of buckskin items and animal hide trousers. The employees who came after him followed suit, combining old Army uniforms with civilian clothes, making it hard to distinguish who was a guardian and who was not.

== Military occupation: 1886 to 1916 ==
On August 18, 1886, the U.S. Army Cavalry arrived in the new park system. Sent in to discourage poachers, defend the forests and stop rampant stagecoach robbery, the Cavalry was easily recognizable by their uniforms, unlike the early "game keepers". The cavalrymen wore riding boots, jodhpurs, and short waist-length tunics of olive drab, which had flat collars. The most distinctive feature was the soldier's "campaign hat", a stiff, wide-brimmed hat of straw or felt with a medium-sized, cylindrical crown that came to a rounded peak. In modern times, this hat has been popularized by the U.S. Forest Service's Smokey Bear, and NPS employees in the 21st century still wear the distinctive campaign hat (or "flat hat" as rangers call it) when in Class A uniform, a direct link back to the 19th century.

The military also hired civilian scouts, identified by their badges. These circular nickel badges were printed with "Yellowstone Park Scout" around a five pointed star, strongly resembling the stereotypical western Sheriff's badges. Clothing for these employees probably stayed at the wearer's discretion until 1907, when the Forest Service began having its rangers purchase official dress. The NPS decided to adopt a similar style, and after several years of internal arguments (several parks had already established uniforms, and quite a few people thought uniforms should be voluntary), rangers across the nation were kitted out in identical clothes. By 1911, the Department of the Interior finalized the outfit that would mark employees as park rangers. The flat hat, or campaign hat, was kept by designers, and the breeches and puttees that were worn resembled those of the cavalry officers that still occupied the parks. The biggest difference between the rangers' and the cavalry officers' uniforms was the tunic; the ranger's tunic of 1911 was basically a Norfolk jacket worn without a belt. It had a high collar, no epaulets, only two pockets (as opposed to the traditional four), and did not fit to the wearers form, as the coat had a more rectangular shape to it. The settled color was to be olive drab, since the Forest Service uniform had already used dark green. By 1912, the style was changed and it continued to change regularly for the next several decades.

The 1912 uniform was the officially-approved start of the olive drab color, previous uniforms had been the same shade of green that the Forest Service wore. It also marked the start of a separate summer and winter uniform, which was much needed by rangers in the colder parks. The riding breeches, puttees and boots were kept, but the hat was changed to the Alpine style, and the coat was altered from the Norfolk style. It became slightly more fitted, pockets were put back on, and the collar, while still high, turned down. Rangers also wore vests under their coats. The buttons which accompanied this uniform were inscribed with the words "National Park Service" at the top, even though the organization would not use this name for another four years. The badge now used by the park rangers (possibly in use since 1905, when the Forest Service split away from the Department of the Interior) was a tin or nickel-plated two inch circle. In the center was stamped an eagle surrounded by a decorative rope edge. There were still internal disagreements as to the style and some rangers refused to wear uniforms at all, reasoning that plain clothes were far more effective when dealing with lawbreakers.

In 1914, the Department added shirts to the list of items becoming "uniform" for all officials. Coats once again had four pockets, although many rangers still wore old style uniforms, having paid for the clothes themselves. At this point in time, there were two main types of uniforms, each named after the person who designed the differing details: the West coast rangers generally wore what was called the Daniels uniform, while the East coast rangers dressed in the older Eisner uniform, which was the style started in 1912. The uniform selection would remain the decision of individual parks for another several years; this included civilian clothes in Yellowstone, and military uniforms in Yosemite, until it became illegal in 1916 for anyone outside of the military to wear those particular uniforms.

The same hat style is worn by Royal Canadian Mounted Police and many state troopers, and even Smokey Bear. Most distinctive aspect of the NPS uniform is its gray and green color, introduced with the Uniform Regulations of 1920. Little has changed since then. Rangers now wear shoes, trousers, and skirts instead of boots and breeches.

== Sources ==
- Badges and Insignia. A Publication of the National Park Service History Collection, Harpers Ferry Center, Harpers Ferry, WV 1991. Uniform history, specifically badges and insignia, from 1894 to 1991; number 1 in the "National Park Service Uniforms" series.
- Badges and Uniform Ornamentation of the National Park Service by R. Bryce Workman
- Workman, R. Bryce (February 1994). National Park Service Uniforms: In Search of an Identity, 1872-1920. DIANE Publishing. ISBN 978-0-7881-8791-9.
- Ironing Out the Wrinkles. A Publication of the National Park Service History Collection, Office of Library, Archives and Graphics Research, Harpers Ferry Center, Harpers Ferry, WV 1995. Uniform history from 1920 to 1932; number 3 in the "National Park Service Uniforms" series.
- Breeches, Blouses, and Skirts. A Publication of the National Park Service History Collection, Office of Library, Archives and Graphics Research, Harpers Ferry Center, Harpers Ferry, WV 1998. Uniform history for women's uniforms, from 1918 to 1991; number 4 in the "National Park Service Uniforms" series.
- The Developing Years. A Publication of the National Park Service History Collection, Office of Library, Archives and Graphics Research, Harpers Ferry Center, Harpers Ferry, WV 1998. Uniform history from 1932 to 1970; number 5 in the "National Park Service Uniforms" series.
