= The Golden Fleecing =

Scrooge McDuck story with Harpies

- Story code: W US 12-02
- Story: Carl Barks
- Ink: Carl Barks
- Date: June 2, 1955
- Hero: Scrooge McDuck
- Pages: 31
- Layout: 3 rows per page
- Appearances: Scrooge McDuck; Donald Duck; Huey, Dewey and Louie
- First publication: Uncle Scrooge #12

"The Golden Fleecing" is a Scrooge McDuck comic book story from 1955, written and drawn by Carl Barks. It's about Scrooge who wants the Golden Fleece to make a jacket.

== Plot ==
Seeing a catalog in men's fashion, Scrooge reflects that a man of his wealth should wear better quality clothes than what he often wears, or as he said "an old broadcloth I found at a rummage sale in Scotland in 1902". Scrooge feels that he should wear a coat of gold and provides gold bars. However, his tailor warns that the coat would be crinkly, as it would be the same as converting bauxite to tinfoil. The tailor says there is no feasible way to make a gold coat unless somehow the Golden Fleece exists. Scrooge decides to give up, realizing that not even his money can buy everything, until he meets a man called Ali Eikral who is from the country of Seikral. Donald Duck, who has never heard of Seikral, is suspicious of the Eikral's intentions, so he asks his grandnephews to look up the name Seikral in the Junior Woodchucks Guidebook. It mentions Jason and the Argonauts. The nephews figure out that "Seikral" is "Larkies" spelled backwards and Larkies are creatures who are half women, half birds and that the true name of their country is Colchis, where Medea fled when her relationship with Jason failed, taking the Golden Fleece with her and putting it a labyrinth of halls to be guarded by a "Sleepless Dragon".

Donald and the nephews are about to warn Scrooge that he is walking into a trap set by Larkies. Donald is also suspicious, and warns Scrooge as well when Scrooge is aboard a boat paying the disguised man five gold bars for his passage to Colchis. Just then, the "Eikrals" throw the gold bars overboard and reveal themselves as Larkies, capturing both Scrooge and Donald as Huey, Dewey, and Louie come to the rescue too late. However, the nephews see the Larkies' discarded gold bars in shallow water, then retrieve them to plan a rescue mission by buying their own weapons and hiring the services of a helicopter pilot to fly them to Colchis. The reason for the Larkies' kidnapping was that their queen has died, and they were on a mission to abduct the world's richest man (believing he is also the best gourmand) to judge in their cooking contest, the winner of which will become the new queen. One of the Larkies named Agnes agrees to help Scrooge and Donald escape if Scrooge says that her recipe is the best. To Scrooge's chagrin, it happened to be parsnip pudding, and Scrooge hates parsnips more than any other food. Later, while her sisters are sulking, the new queen Agnes lets Scrooge and Donald go but regrets it, so she later tricks them into yelling the word "Seikral" to find the way into the labyrinth. However, the maze of halls has a unique effect that will reverse the sound, so "Larkies" is shouted back. The Larkies find out that they escaped and bombard them near to the point of submission. However, the nephews arrive and drive away the Larkies with traps such as mice.

Eventually, Scrooge and Donald reunite with the nephews and they find the Golden Fleece and defeat the Sleepless Dragon by covering its eyes with the Golden Fleece then sing a lullaby. Scrooge rejoices that he will now have the world's most fashionable coat, gold cloth with diamond buttons. One month later, they are back in Duckburg where the tailor has now finished Scrooge's coat. Donald and the nephews marvel at Scrooge's sparkling coat, however he retrieves his old broadcloth he discarded, remarking "this glittering mackintosh is the coldest contraption I ever had on my back!"

== Miscellaneous ==
The moral of the story is to be happy with what you have if it makes you feel comfortable.

This story was later adapted into a DuckTales animated television episode. Donald was replaced with Launchpad McQuack and Ludwig von Drake was added. Also, in the DuckTales version, Scrooge doesn't keep the Golden Fleece but leaves it in Colchis.

This story was originally printed in Uncle Scrooge #12 then reprinted in Gladstone Comic Album #19 and Uncle Scrooge Adventures #28 and then Carl Barks' Greatest DuckTales Stories #2.

== See also ==
- List of Disney comics by Carl Barks
