= Donald Duck pocket books =

Comic book series

The Donald Duck pocket books are a series of paperback-sized publications published in various European countries, featuring Disney comics.

== Production ==
=== Background ===
The pocket books were originally published irregularly (about 6 times a year) until 1987 and monthly since. They are roughly A5-sized (digest size) and about 250 pages thick. Each book has about eight stories, but the numbers of stories can vary widely from issue to issue. As of 10 September 2019, there are 524 issues. Almost all stories come from European publishers, namely Mondadori / Disney Italy from Italy and, more recently, Egmont from Denmark.

Most of the artists are from Italy (among the most famous and internationally renowned being Romano Scarpa, Marco Rota, Pier Lorenzo De Vita, Massimo De Vita, Giorgio Cavazzano, Giovan Battista Carpi, Luciano Bottaro) with a minority of Danish artists (such as Flemming Andersen), and very few stories are drawn by Spanish and Argentinian artists.

=== Production process ===
Just like their larger, comic book-sized European Disney comic counterparts and as is common with North-American superhero comics, hardly any story published in the pocket books is made by one single person, instead each story is a combined effort. An author writes a story for which the production company assigns an artist whose unique style they think most resembles the story's particular spirit, then the artist's drawings are completed, again per management directions, first by a particular inker and then a particular colorist. These groupings can at times be only loose and variable from story to story (especially stable author-artist groupings are rare), but particular artist-inker-colorist groupings can last long enough to define what later is recognized as an artist's defined "style period". It was not until the late 1990s that the production companies began to print at least the name of author and artist of each Disney story in their publications.

=== Black-and-white vs. colour ===
Until issue #118 [German numbering], a particular limitation of the pocket books out of economical reasons was that only half of the pages were printed in colour, while for the other half simply the uncoloured line art was printed. This was done in an alternating routine so that one pair of pages (left and right page) one was looking at was black and white, and turning to the next pair of pages they were in colour, etc. It was not until issue #119 (spring 1987, shortly before the move to monthly issues) that the pocket books were printed in full colour. In later reprints, these early issues were published in all-colour.

=== Mini pocket books ===
In the late 2000s, "mini" pocket books have also appeared. These mini pocket books are smaller (A6-sized rather than A5-sized) but have slightly more pages, and consist almost exclusively of reprints of stories in previously appeared full-size pocket books, rather than all-new material.

=== Additional series ===
Since the 1990s, many additional side series have been launched, some of which were printed in many countries, others being more specific to a few areas. These include Christmas-, Easter-, summer-, winter and Halloween-themed books, big issues that collect a mixture of reprints and unissued stories, oversized "Premium" books dedicated to specific series (PKNA, X-Mickey, Mickey Mouse Mystery Magazine, Darkwing Duck, DoubleDuck and others), and editions dedicated to various characters. Some of these are one-shots, others appear with different regularity.

== Distinguishing features ==
=== Framework stories ===
The blueprint for all the European pocket books was the Italian series I Classici, which reprinted and collected comics from the weekly and much thinner Topolino.

A special feature of these early issues of pocket books were the so-called framework stories. In these early days, the stories used to be connected with each other by a framework story, forming a general story line throughout the entire book. For every one of those early issues, the publishers mostly chose unrelated stories from a large pool, and it was only after those stories had been chosen that a fitting framework would be written, then drawn in a sub-standard quality style by the artist Giuseppe Perego. As the feature gradually fell out of use, Perego was partly replaced by Giancarlo Gatti, an artist whose quality is more on par with that of the usual production level and who like Perego often publishes full-length main stories instead of only doing "filler" frameworks in between these.

The framework feature was gradually dropped during the 1980s (roughly between the issues #80-#100), as nowadays each story is usually completely independent from the other stories in the same issue. In this era, the German/Scandinavian series became independent from the Italian role model. While I Classici continues to be released to this day, there is no connection between its story selection and the Egmont-selected pocketbooks anymore.

=== Spine-assembly pictures ===
Since the same issue as full-color was introduced, the pocket books also feature pictures of Disney characters on their spines, a feature especially appealing to collectors as these pictures make it instantly apparent if an issue is missing when the pocket books are lined up on a cupboard. The first spine-assembly picture ran from 1987 until late 1991/early 1992, since then each spine picture (usually) spans a year (= 12 issues). This feature was also added to reprints of the early issues that originally did not have it.

=== "Choose your own adventure" stories ===
Some of the stories have a "choose your own adventure" aspect (semi-officially called "Which-way stories"). The reading order of the story is not completely linear. At the end of approximately every fourth page a choice is presented to the reader about what the character should do next, with two or three options. The reader makes their choice by turning to the page mentioned in the option. Thus, stories of this kind have about six to eight alternative endings. A rarer variation of this is the stories that are built up like levels in a video game; there is only one ending but various ways to get there, which includes several "wrong" turns of events that lead back to a previous point in the story so that the reader has to choose a different path in order to eventually arrive at the end.

== In different countries ==
The same stories, which are mostly written and drawn by Italian writers and artists, are translated into different languages and appear in each country roughly about the same time, but there are differences of one or two months between the publishing schedules of different countries. As there was no connection between issues other than the recurring cast of characters, the early issues (until about #30?) were mostly published in different order all over Europe, so the German #3 for instance is not the same as the Danish, French, or Finnish #3. A few of the I Classici (e.g. the 1964 Olympics issue entirely by Romano Scarpa) also were never adapted outside Italy, and the stories weren't printed in the respective languages until much later.

Various local names for the Donald Duck pocket books include:

- Egyptian : ميكى جيب
- Bulgarian: Макрокомикс: Истории от Дъкбург since 2025
- Chinese: 终极米迷 （Zhongji Mimi ) since 2006, discontinued in 2018
- Czech: Superkomiks
- Danish: Jumbobog
- Dutch: Donald Duck Pocket
- English: Jumbo Book (Great Britain; only 4 issues were released, 1981-1982)
- Estonian : Miki Hiir Koomiksikogu
- Finnish: Aku Ankan taskukirja
- French : Mickey Parade (from issue #723bis, April 1966 to #1433bis, December 1979)
- German: Lustiges Taschenbuch (before issue #119, April 1987, the title was Walt Disneys Lustige Taschenbücher)
- Icelandic: Myndasögusyrpa/Syrpa
- Italian: I Classici di Walt Disney
- Latvian: Donalds Daks – Tavā Kabatā since 2012
- Norwegian: Donald Pocket
- Polish: Gigant Poleca (formerly Komiks Gigant)
- Romanian: Donald Duck de Buzunar (only 4 issues were released, in 2011)
- Russian: Комикс Disney (Komiks Disney) since 2010
- Serbian: Џепни Паја Патак since 2021
- Slovenian: Vesela žepna knjiga (only 3 issues were issued, all in 1997)
- Swedish: Kalle Ankas Pocket

All these books started publishing in 1967 and 1968 respectively, except for the Finnish version, which started in 1970, the Polish which started in 1992, Icelandic which started in 1994 and Estonian which started in 2008. The Italian edition, published since 1957, was the inspiration for the later European editions.
