= John D. Rockerduck =

Disney comics character

- Donald Duck character
- First appearance: "Boat Buster" in Walt Disney's Comics and Stories #255 (December 1961)
- Created by: Carl Barks
- Voiced by: John Hodgman
- Alias: Roller Dollar (as a supervillain)
- Relatives: Howard Rockerduck (father); "Ciccia" Rockerduck (mother); Eider (aunt); Soames Rockerduck (uncle); Arsène, George, Patrick, Simeon and Ricky Rockerduck (nephews); Ilary Duck (niece)

John D. Rockerduck is a character in the Duck universe. He was created in 1961 by Carl Barks for The Walt Disney Company. He is one of Scrooge McDuck's main rivals in Disney comics. His name is a play on that of John D. Rockefeller, the American capitalist and philanthropist. Though a relatively obscure character in the United States, Rockerduck is an example of a character who has become notable outside of the U.S., particularly in stories produced for the Italian market. He made his first animated appearance in 2019, in the second season of the DuckTales reboot.

== Publication history ==
Rockerduck was created by Carl Barks, who used him in one story: "Boat Buster", first published in Walt Disney's Comics and Stories #255 (December 1961). In that story, he was portrayed as an oil tycoon who argued with Scrooge McDuck, portrayed in that story as another oil tycoon, over which one of them made the best gasoline. To settle this, Scrooge and John agreed each one to enter a boat at an upcoming race. Scrooge was so confident of his victory he said he could win regardless of who was driving his boat. Trying to prove his point, Scrooge randomly picked somebody from the crowd watching their argument. However, he loses confidence when that somebody happened to be Donald Duck. To increase his chances of victory, Scrooge saw to it that all other boats in the race (there were a hundred boats counting Donald's and John's) were powered by his gasoline. Near the end, several boats (Donald's included) crashed and a loose motor pushed a freely-floating Donald into the finish line in the first place. Scrooge claimed victory, but Rockerduck pointed out they first must find out whose gasoline was powering that motor. Despite the odds being for Scrooge, the motor happened to be the one powered by John Rockerduck's gasoline. Rockerduck was jumping in celebration while an enraged Scrooge chased Donald.

The character has rarely appeared in American stories but appears regularly in Latin American and European stories, and especially in Italian ones. He also appeared in stories produced by the now defunct Disney Studio Program. His first appearance in an Italian story was Zio Paperone e il kiwi volante ("Uncle Scrooge and the Flying Kiwi") by Giampaolo Barosso and Giorgio Bordini, first published on March 1, 1963. After this, the Disney Studio Program developed the character, and since then the Italian creators have further developed Rockerduck and explored various aspects of his relationship with Scrooge.

One distinctive character trait is a habit of eating his bowler hat whenever he is defeated by Scrooge. This has led in some stories to Rockerduck eating an entire truckload of hats, because of an especially abject defeat.

Like his rival, he is a shrewd businessman and has managed to organize a worldwide financial empire that can easily rival those of Scrooge or Flintheart Glomgold. Unlike them, he is not a tightwad but much more a liberal spender (but by no means a squanderer), as Rockerduck seems to maintain that "you have to spend money to make money". This trait makes him a natural antagonist to Scrooge, who is capable of going towards absurd lengths to spare even trivial sums of money. Their rivalry is further contrasted by the fact that Rockerduck was born into luxury, rather than earning his fortune by his own hard work, which is another reason for Scrooge's, and sometimes even Glomgold's disrespect toward him. Rockerduck has a taste for luxury, and likes to show off his wealth. Besides his secretary, advisor, and right-hand man Jeeves, he does not seem to have any close confidants.

Like Scrooge and Flintheart, Rockerduck is extremely competitive. He is rivaling them in the wealth department and has occasionally claimed the titles of "The Richest Duck in the World" and "The Second Richest Duck in the World". Since those titles belong to Scrooge and Flintheart respectively, it can be inferred that he owns the title of "The Third Richest Duck in the World", or that Glomgold and Rockerduck are constantly competing for the second and third places. Stories that have Rockerduck or Glomgold actually measuring their fortunes against that of Scrooge invariably end with Scrooge being ahead by an entirely trivial amount. In one story, Scrooge's and Rockerduck's fortunes turned out to be exactly the same, but Scrooge could triumphantly point out that his Number One Dime had not been included in the count, putting him ahead by exactly one dime. For all practical purposes, the three ducks would seem to be equally rich.

Rockerduck is an influential member of the Billionaires' Club of Duckburg, of which Scrooge and Flintheart are also members. Only five stories feature him and Flintheart both, though: Zio Paperone e il bisbilione ("Uncle Scrooge and the bil-billion", 1967), written by Osvaldo Pavese and drawn by Giuseppe Perego; Whatever Happened to Scrooge McDuck? (1996), written by Lars Jensen and drawn by Maximino Tortajada Aguilar, where Rockerduck and Glomgold both make a cameo in a future vision that shows both of them having been made bankrupt by Donald's Duck charity company; Scrooge's Last Adventure (2003), written by Francesco Artibani and drawn by Alessandro Perina, where they team up with the Beagle Boys and Magica De Spell against Scrooge; The Three Billionaires (2005), written and drawn by Kari Korhonen; and The Great Egg Robbery (2019) written by Carol McGreal and Pat McGreal and drawn by Giorgio Cavazzano.

Another possible distinction between the characters is their country of residence and where their investments lie. In contrast to the Scottish birth of Scrooge, Rockerduck claims to be hailing from England like his father Howard, where he is sometimes depicted to be living, and shown to be the more active in Europe than in America, with some stories having Scrooge having to buy land from him or compete with him to be able to expand his businesses on the European markets. This is often ignored in other stories to be able to have the rivals meet on a daily basis as in the case of Scrooge's other rival, Flintheart Glomgold (who in the Barks stories lives in South Africa) with John primarily managing his activities from a large business building he owns in Duckburg, and the three characters sitting at the same table in the Billionaires' Club of the city.

Rockerduck also has a passion for collecting. Besides his valuable coins and stamp collection, he is also the owner of an extensive art collection, including artifacts created from antiquity through to the 20th century. Since Scrooge also has collections of the same theme and similar value, many of their confrontations center on them trying to obtain a new addition to their collections.

Many of the stories presenting him, especially during the 1970s and the 1980s, compare and contrast his and Scrooge's methods of organizing their business in order to gain profit. Some of those methods include researching new products for their industries, ways of refining and improving the existing ones, and the study of new producing methods. Also ways of improving their marketing techniques and public relations, in order to increase sales. Or even trying to improve the ratings of their TV stations and the sales of their newspapers, in order to have more clients paying for advertisements in them. Both he and Scrooge try to predict each other's moves in order to act accordingly. In his efforts, Rockerduck often resorts to industrial espionage or sabotage. Although less often, Scrooge occasionally uses the same methods. Sometimes Rockerduck's plans against Scrooge involve more severe actions like abduction, hijacking his planes, or blackmailing him. On these occasions, he usually lets his right-hand man Jeeves do the dirty work, but he also hires the Beagle Boys to do his dirty work for him from time to time.

On a more personal level, Scrooge and Rockerduck seem to bicker constantly, criticizing each other's ways of life and personal faults. Although his confrontations with Scrooge have often found him defeated or even humiliated, he has commented on at least enjoying the challenge that Scrooge presents to him. At times the two find each other co-operating to achieve common goals. If they are worthy rivals to each other, they also seem to make effective partners—but only on a temporary basis. Some stories portray Rockerduck in a more positive light and portray him as friendly towards Scrooge's associates like Brigitta McBridge and Donald Duck, as he has no personal grudges against them. When relaxed, he can even be a pleasant companion for them or Scrooge. In all these traits, he differs from Flintheart Glomgold.

In other stories, Donald Duck may be pitted against both Scrooge and Rockerduck during one of their temporary alliances. Such stories emphasize Scrooge's morally ambiguous role in Italian Disney comics, where he frequently exploits Donald, or makes his life miserable in other ways. When cooperating with Rockerduck, Scrooge may be particularly insufferable, and the reader is invited to sympathize with Donald as the underdog in his conflict with the ruthless and powerful billionaires.

In the story Brother From Another Earth! (1995), written by Rudy Salvagnini and drawn by Giorgio Cavazzano, Scrooge is convinced to take a holiday on "Earth-D" by his counterpart "Scrooge-B". In this alternate reality, a discouraged Scrooge is heavily in debt to several creditors; one being Rockerduck. The alternate Rockerduck has no visible businesses save for a greengrocery which he manages, and says that he made a mistake investing in the failing McDuck stock. When "Scrooge-A" works to get his counterpart's business back on track, he retires the debt to Rockerduck, and also buys the produce store, keeping John D. Rockerduck on board as proprietor. Rockerduck admits that although odd to be part of McDuck's recovering business empire, he also say "it makes me feel almost like the free-spending tycoon I used to be!"

== Character biography ==
Barks never gave Rockerduck an origin. Don Rosa later provided him with one, in his series The Life and Times of Scrooge McDuck. According to Don Rosa, Rockerduck has several differences from both his fictional rival and his historical namesake. Rockefeller and Scrooge were born in poverty and worked to earn their fortunes. John D. Rockerduck was born c. 1878 (this is arguably in contrast to many stories where he seem to be at least 20 years younger than Scrooge) to Howard Rockerduck, an American millionaire who had earned his fortune in the California gold rush of 1849. While John's father was a shrewd businessman but a mild-mannered man, his mother was a rather snobbish woman who spoiled her son. Much to his father's disappointment, John learned at an early age to look down on everyone less affluent than his family as a "peasant". While his father tried to remind him that he was once poor too, John became as snobbish as his mother.

John's first meeting with Scrooge occurred in 1885, in Butte, Montana. At the time, John was around 7 years old and Scrooge was 18 years old. Howard Rockerduck was heading to a meeting with Marcus Daly, an Irish businessman known as the "Copper King", to discuss his investments in the Anaconda Copper Mining Company. Unsure of the way, Howard stopped to ask for directions. The person he asked was young Scrooge, at the time an unsuccessful copper prospector. Despite John's protestations, Howard started having a friendly discussion with the inexperienced prospector and ended up teaching Scrooge the secrets of the job, and helping him earn ten thousand dollars. While Scrooge had to leave for Scotland to attend to family business, John again protested against his father's relationship with the "filthy peasant". Howard, to whom Scrooge resembled his younger-self, introduced his son to corporal punishment in an effort to teach him some manners. (Judging from his later behaviour, this did not work.) John Rockerduck would later inherit his father's fortune and grow to become a rival of Scrooge.

The appearance in The Life and Times of Scrooge McDuck was the only use of the character by Don Rosa.

The story Il Matrimonio di Zio Paperone ("Uncle Scrooge's Wedding"), created by Massimo De Vita, tells another tale about the origins of Rockerduck's wealth and his rivalry with Scrooge. The story is told by Scrooge's secretary, Ms. Quackfaster, to Scrooge's nephews Huey, Dewey, and Louie. Many years ago, when Rockerduck was not as rich as he is nowadays (he was a starting millionaire), he ran into Scrooge in the Millionaires Club. They started arguing and decided to settle their argument with a game of golf. If Rockerduck was to defeat Scrooge, he would win half of Scrooge's entire fortune. It looked like Scrooge was going to win. However, a bee stung him while golfing, so he missed the last hole, leading Rockerduck to win. He then won half of Scrooge's fortune.

Other stories have further traced the Rockerduck family history. Although some depict John as a distant cousin of Scrooge, through an unspecified genealogical connection, others have traced their rivalry to their ancestors. Arguably, the most notable among the later stories is an eight-part saga named Storia e gloria della dinastia dei paperi ("History and glory of the Duck dynasty") by Guido Martina, Romano Scarpa, Giorgio Cavazzano and Giovan Battista Carpi, first published April 5-May 24, 1970. It depicts their family history, as a family feud that begun in Rome during the 1st century BC and continues to the 20th century.

In one story where Rockerduck was trying to ruin Scrooge's deal about cleaning the statue of Cornelius Coot, Jeeves sheepishly tells him "You have no conscience, sir", to which Rockerduck replies: "That's not true. I had a conscience a long time ago, but I'd rather not talk about that."

According to the story Whatever Happened to Scrooge McDuck? by Lars Jensen and Maximino Tortajada Aguilar, Rockerduck (as well as Flintheart Glomgold) was made bankrupt by Donald Duck, after the latter had inherited Scrooge's fortune and turned it into a charity company. However, the end of the story reveals that it actually takes place in an alternate future, caused by Scrooge travelling 100 years into the past to retrieve his #1 dime.

== Roller Dollar ==
Roller Dollar is Rockerduck's super-villain alter ego. He was created for the Italian saga Ultraheroes.

== Howard Rockerduck ==
Howard Rockerduck is the father of John D. Rockerduck. Howard was created by Don Rosa and used in three stories – "The Life and Times of Scrooge McDuck: Raider of the Copper Hill" (Uncle Scrooge #288), "Of Ducks and Dimes and Destinies" (Uncle Scrooge #297) and "La Ballata di John D. Rockerduck" (Topolino 3439). In The Life and Times of Scrooge McDuck, Howard acts as one of Scrooge McDuck's many early mentors – others include Sir Quackly McDuck's ghost and a young Theodore Roosevelt.

Howard Rockerduck was born poor, but worked his way to the top and became a very wealthy man, and was helped by a "lucky strike" when he prospected for gold. As shown in "Of Ducks…", he was in Glasgow in 1877, looking for a woman, and threw some American coins to some poor children. One of these coins was the Number One Dime. Shortly after, Rockerduck got so scared by the behaviour of a Scottish woman (actually Magica De Spell in disguise) that he went home to the USA. Magica's interference would also indirectly result in the conception of John D. Rockerduck, as Howard gave up on Scottish girls and instead focused his attention towards England in the hopes of finding a bride, to which he would ultimately be successful.

He was next seen in Anaconda, Montana, in 1884, where he met the young Scrooge McDuck, who tried to establish himself as a prospector. Rockerduck, now a family man, saw his younger self in Scrooge, and taught him how to be a prospector. Later, he helped Scrooge make a juridical claim to the Anaconda Copper Mine, which were owned by Marcus Daly and some rich investors. Scrooge later learned that Rockerduck himself was among these investors.

== In other media ==
Rockerduck, voiced by John Hodgman, made his animated debut in 2019, in the DuckTales reboot, being a recurring antagonist in the series. Prior to his appearance, Rockerduck was described by series co-creator Francisco Angones as a robber baron and billionaire competitor of Scrooge McDuck during the 1930s. Rockerduck was introduced in season two's ninth episode "The Outlaw Scrooge McDuck!", where he is portrayed as a wealthy and corrupt businessman in the Old West while Scrooge was still a young prospector who had not yet made his fortune. Rockerduck's M.O. at the time was buying whole towns with the promise of improving them, when in reality, he actually steals their resources and leave them behind as ghost towns. He encounters Scrooge while attempting to claim a gigantic gold nugget found in his latest acquisition, the town of Gumption, despite the fact that Scrooge and Goldie O'Gilt found it first. Scrooge and Goldie later steal the nugget back, and return it to Gumption. In season two's one-hour finale "Moonvasion!", it is revealed that Rockerduck had used experimental cryogenics to stay alive and became an agent of F.O.W.L. In season three’s eleventh episode "The Forbidden Fountain of the Foreverglades!" he seeks out the titular fountain to rejuvenate his youth, which he succeeds in. In the series finale" The Last Adventure!", he joins F.O.W.L. in a plot to rid the world of adventuring, but is driven off by Mrs. Beakley. and his exact fate is left unknown.

== Popularity ==
While in the United States the character has long been obscure, in many countries Rockerduck is almost as well known as Scrooge himself, to the point that his name has been used as a metaphor example. In Italy, he is so familiar in popular culture that his name has been occasionally used as a metaphor for "unlikable and/or dishonest wealthy person", "go-getter", or "rival millionaire" (i.e., a millionaire who is the rival of another millionaire, in this instance, Bill Koch, rival of Raul "Uncle Scrooge" Gardini). The figure of Rockerduck was also used in a study about pathological greed, as the archrival of Scrooge, who is himself the example of said greed.
