= Erika Fuchs =

German translator (1906–2005)

- Born: Johanne Theodolinde Erika Petri; 7 December 1906; Rostock, German Empire
- Died: 22 April 2005 (aged 98); Munich, Germany

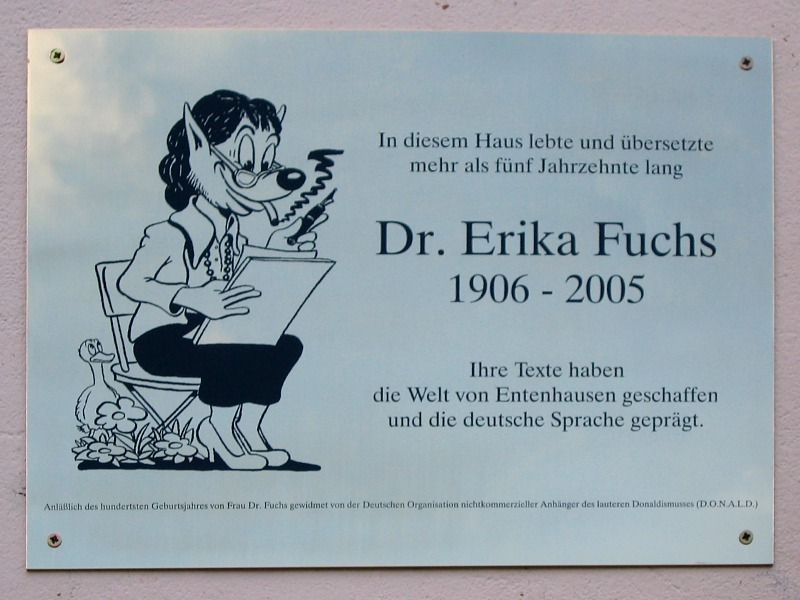
Memorial plate on Erika Fuchs's house in Schwarzenbach, Germany, donated in 2006 by the German D.O.N.A.L.D. The inscription reads in German, "In this house, Dr. Erika Fuchs (1906-2005) lived and translated for more than five decades. Her texts have profoundly crafted the world of Duckburg and enriched the German language."

Erika Fuchs, née Petri (7 December 1906 – 22 April 2005), was a German translator. She is largely known in Germany for her major involvement in the localization process of American Disney comics, especially Carl Barks' stories about Duckburg and its inhabitants, as well the effects on the German language as a whole caused thereby.

Both her grammatical innovations and adaptation of classical literary features into modern pop-cultural works have been recognized as positive contributions to contemporary used language and to the image of comics as media in Germany, having played a major part in delegitimizing public perception of said comics as low-quality pulp fiction. Fuchs' widely quoted translations have further been described standing in the tradition of great German-language light poetry such as the works of Heinrich Heine, Wilhelm Busch, and Kurt Tucholsky. She has been emblematically quoted as saying "You can't be educated enough to translate comic books", reflecting her high standards for localization work.

== Life ==
Johanne Theodolinde Erika Petri was born on 7 December 1906 in Rostock as the second of six children of electrical engineer August Petri and his wife Auguste. Erika spent most of her childhood and youth in Belgard, a small rural town in Pomerania, where her father became director of the newly-built electric power plant in 1911. In 1922, Erika Petri became the first girl ever to be admitted to the town's boys' Gymnasium, passing her Abitur exam there in 1926. She went on to study art history in Lausanne, Munich and London and graduated with a doctorate in 1931. Her dissertation titled "Johann Michael Feuchtmayr: Ein Beitrag zur Geschichte des deutschen Rokoko" ("A contribution to the history of German Rococo)" was marked magna cum laude. It appeared in print only in 1935. In 1932, Erika Petri married engineer, industrialist and inventor Günter Fuchs (1907-1984). From 1933 to 1984, the couple lived in Schwarzenbach an der Saale, a small industrial town in Upper Franconia. They had two sons, Thomas and Nikolaus.

Following World War II, Erika Fuchs worked as a translator for the German edition of Reader's Digest, as well as for German literary magazine 'Story', published by Rowohlt Verlag since 1946. In 1951, she became chief editor of Disney's newly-formed German Micky Maus magazine, where she continued to work until her retirement in 1988.

After the death of her husband in 1984, Erika Fuchs moved to Munich, where she died on 22 April 2005.

== Work ==
Many of her creations as translator of Carl Barks comics entered or reentered German in contemporary use. The phrase "Dem Ingeniör ist nichts zu schwör" ("nothing is too hard for an engineer"), but with the vowels (umlauts) at the end of "Ingenieur" and "schwer" altered to make them rhyme, was often attributed to Fuchs as she had made it Gyro Gearloose's catchphrase; though it was originally based on a song written by Heinrich Seidel. A somewhat more clumsy version of the phrase was the first verse of "Seidels Ingenieurlied" ("The Engineer's Song") and had been used by fraternities at technical universities for the German equivalent of The Ritual of the Calling of an Engineer. Fuchs had heard it from her husband, who was an engineer himself.

An example of Fuchs' many allusions to classical German literature may be found in her translation of Barks's 1956 story "Three Un-Ducks" (INDUCKS story code W WDC 184-01), where Huey, Dewey, and Louie speak the oath "Wir wollen sein ein einig Volk von Brüdern, in keiner Not uns waschen und Gefahr" ("We Shall be a United People of Brethren, Never to Wash in Danger nor Distress"), thereby parodying Friedrich Schiller's version of the Rütlischwur from his 1804 play William Tell.

Her use of verbs shortened to their stems as interjections— not only to imitate sounds (onomatopoeia), such as schluck, stöhn, knarr, klimper (gulp, groan, creak, chink/jingle), but also to represent soundless events grübel, staun, zitter (ponder, goggle, tremble) — popularized the verb form. While the official technical term for this remains Inflektiv, the term Erikativ, a tongue-in-cheek reference to Fuchs' first name, made to resemble similar grammatical terms such as Infinitiv (infinitive), Indikativ (indicative mood) or Akkusativ (accusative case), has seen more use. The form itself was commonly used as a form of emoting in Internet forums and chatrooms well into the 2010s, with users seeking to simulate aspects of face-to-face communication by employing Inflektive of off-screen activities enclosed in asterisks (e.g. *lach*, *weglauf*, *zwinker*).

== Honors and legacy ==
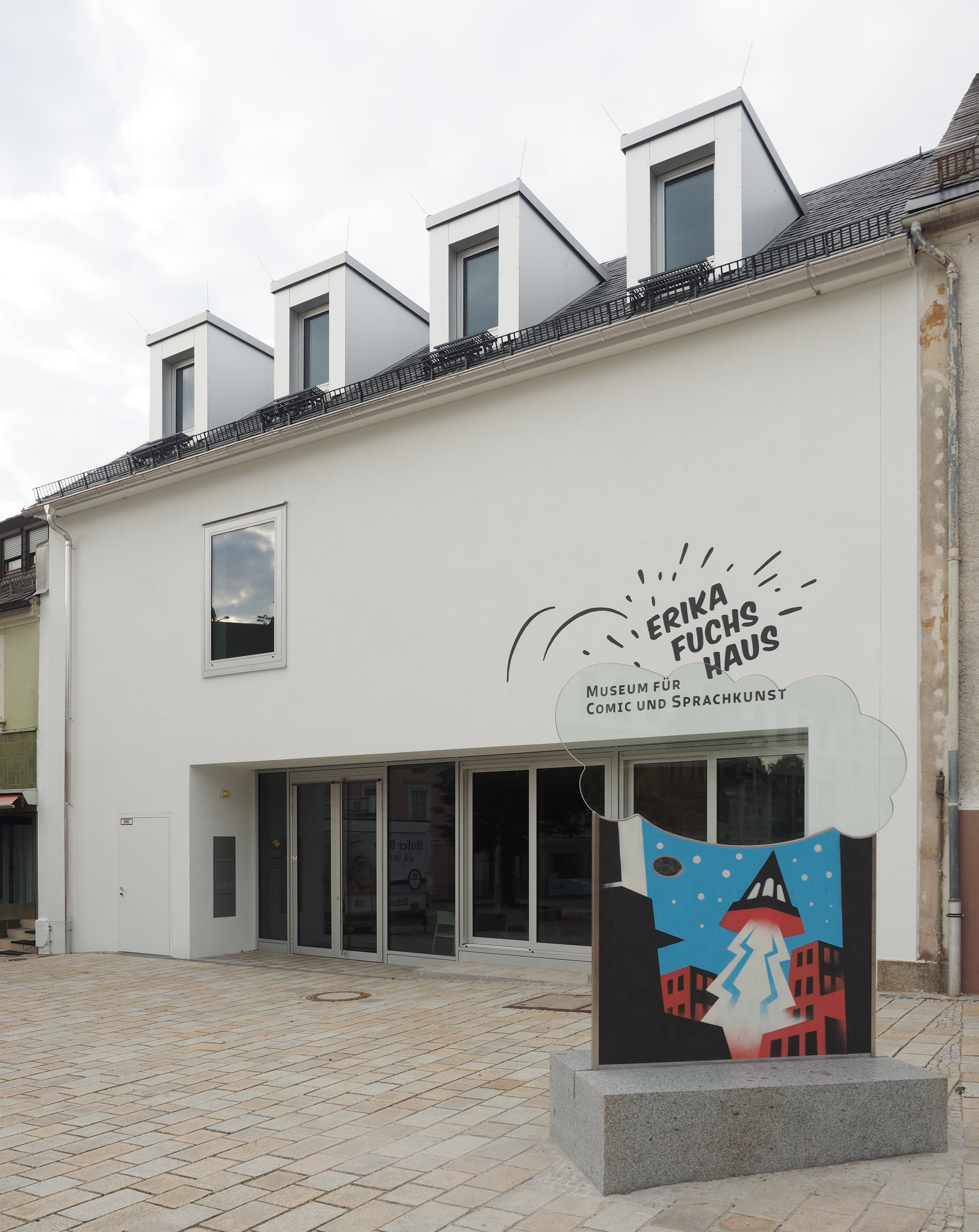
The Erika-Fuchs-Haus in Schwarzenbach a.d. Saale in 2015.

In 1994, Erika Fuchs was honored by the German stage award Morenhovener Lupe, in 1998 by the German fantasy literature award Deutscher Fantasy Preis, and in 2001 she was awarded the Heimito von Doderer Prize for Literature and Roswitha Prize for her work on Disney comics. Until her death at age 98, Erika Fuchs was an honorary member of the "D.O.N.A.L.D." ("Deutsche Organisation nichtkommerzieller Anhänger des lauteren Donaldismus" or the "German Organization of Non-commercial Devotees of the true Donaldism"). Some members of the organisation (Patrick Bahners and Andreas Platthaus) occasionally included hidden references to Fuchs' works in the headlines of Frankfurter Allgemeine Zeitung.

In 1991, painter Gottfried Helnwein set a portrait of Fuchs among his work Die 48 bedeutendsten Frauen des Jahrhunderts (48 Most Important Women of the Century). The work is now to be found at Museum Ludwig in Cologne.

A comic museum in her hometown of Schwarzenbach an der Saale, named after Erika Fuchs, saw its opening on 1 August 2015.
