= Disney comics =

Comics featuring Walt Disney characters

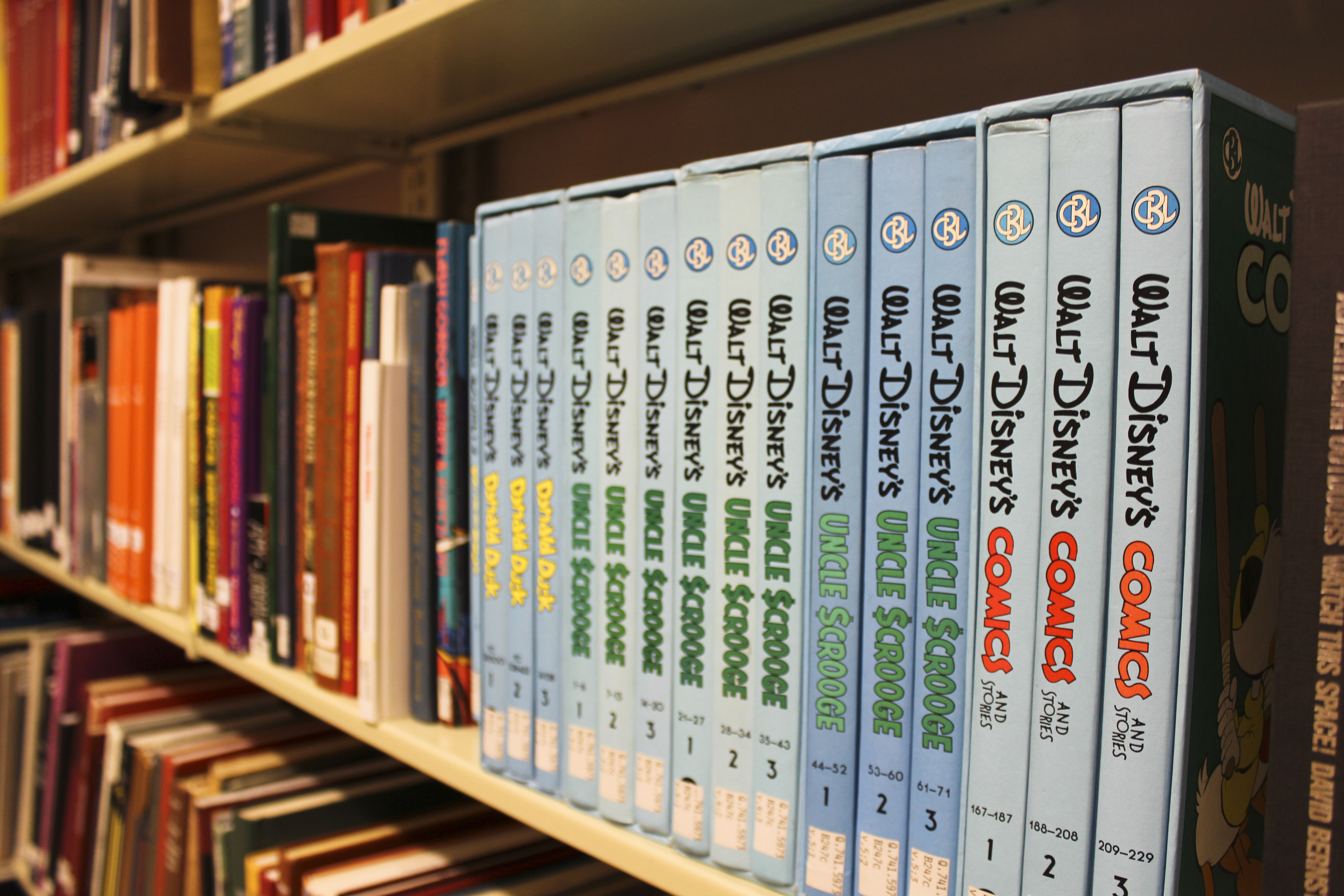
Walt Disney's Comics; Uncle Scrooge; and Donald Duck.

Disney comics are comic books and comic strips featuring characters created by the Walt Disney Company, including Mickey Mouse, Donald Duck, Goofy, Scrooge McDuck and José Carioca.

The first Disney comics were newspaper strips appearing from 1930 on, starting with the Mickey Mouse comic strip. Mickey Mouse Magazine, the first American newsstand publication with Disney comics, launched in 1935. In 1940, Western Publishing launched the long-running flagship comic book, Walt Disney's Comics and Stories, which reached 750 issues in September 2019. Uncle Scrooge, launched in 1952, reached issue #450 in June 2019. In recent decades, Disney comics have seen a decline of popularity in the United States. In the rest of the world Disney comics have remained very successful, especially in Europe, where weekly Disney comics magazines and monthly paperback digests are national best sellers.

Disney comics have been the basis for academic theory, cultural criticism, and fan-created databases.

== U.S. comic strips ==
The first Disney comics appeared in daily newspapers, syndicated by King Features with production done in-house by a Disney comic strip department at the studio. Initially Floyd Gottfredson along with his responsibilities for the Mickey Mouse comic strip oversaw the Disney comic strip department from 1930 to 1945, then Frank Reilly was brought in to administer the burgeoning department from January 1946 to 1975. Greg Crosby headed the department from 1979 to 1989.

=== Mickey Mouse ===
The Mickey Mouse daily comic strip began on January 13, 1930, featuring Mickey as an optimistic, adventure-seeking young mouse. It was initially written by Walt Disney with art by Ub Iwerks and Win Smith. Beginning with the May 5, 1930, installment the art chores were taken up by Floyd Gottfredson (often aided by various inkers), who also either wrote or supervised the story continuities (relying on various writers to flesh out his plots). Gottfredson continued with the strip until 1975. By 1931, the Mickey Mouse strip was published in 60 newspapers in the United States, as well as papers in twenty other countries.

From the beginning, the strips were parts of long continuing stories. These introduced characters such as the Phantom Blot, Eega Beeva, and the Bat Bandit, which Gottfredson created; Disney created Eli Squinch, Mickey's nephews, Morty and Ferdie Fieldmouse, and Sylvester Shyster, which were also introduced in the comic.

Starting in the 1950s, Gottfredson and writer Bill Walsh were instructed to drop the storylines and do only daily gags. Gottfredson continued illustrating the daily strip until he retired on October 1, 1975.

After Gottfredson retired, the strip was written and drawn by many other creators. The Sunday page went into reprints in February 1992, and the daily strip ended on July 29, 1995.

In 2011, Fantagraphics Books began the Walt Disney's Mickey Mouse series, a hardback collection of Gottfredson's run on the strip. A total of 14 volumes were published between 2011 and 2018, collecting the entirety of Gottfredson's Sunday color work (two volumes) and all of his serialized story-themed daily strips (12 volumes). The collection doesn't include any of Gottfredson's gag-oriented material from 1955 onwards.

=== Silly Symphony ===
The Mickey Mouse Sunday strip started on January 10, 1932, with a topper Silly Symphony strip.Silly Symphony initially related the adventures of Bucky Bug, the first Disney character to originate in the comics. It went on to print more adaptations of Silly Symphony shorts, often using the characters and setting of the original shorts, but adding new plotlines and incidents. It also went on to print adaptations of the feature films, as well as periods of gag strips featuring Donald Duck and Pluto. By late 1935 the strip was a standalone half-page, not strictly a topper for the Mickey Sunday.

The strip was initially titled Silly Symphonies; after two years, the name was changed to Silly Symphony. The switch happened in the February 18, 1934, strip, just three weeks before Bucky Bug would be replaced with a new storyline, "Birds of a Feather".

The complete rundown of Silly Symphony strips, from 1932 to 1945:

- Bucky Bug (January 10, 1932 – March 4, 1934)
- Birds of a Feather (March 11 – June 17, 1934)
- Penguin Isle (July 1 – September 9, 1934)
- The Wise Little Hen (September 16 – December 16, 1934)
- The Boarding-School Mystery (December 23, 1934 – Feb 17, 1935)
- The Robber Kitten (Feb 24 – April 21, 1935)
- Cookieland (April 28 – July 21, 1935)
- Three Little Kittens (July 28 – October 20, 1935)
- The Life and Adventures of Elmer the Elephant (October 27, 1935 – January 12, 1936)
- The Further Adventures of the Three Little Pigs (January 19 – August 23, 1936)
- Donald Duck (August 30, 1936 – December 5, 1937)
- Snow White and the Seven Dwarfs (December 12, 1937 – April 24, 1938)
- The Practical Pig! (May 1 – August 7, 1938)
- Mother Pluto (August 14 – October 16, 1938)
- Farmyard Symphony (October 23 – November 27, 1938)
- Timid Elmer (December 4, 1938 – Feb 12, 1939)
- Pluto the Pup (Feb 19 – March 19, 1939)
- The Ugly Duckling (March 26 – April 16, 1939)
- Pluto the Pup (April 23 – December 17, 1939)
- Pinocchio (December 24, 1939 – April 7, 1940)
- Pluto the Pup (April 14 – November 3, 1940)
- Little Hiawatha (November 10, 1940 – July 12, 1942)
- Bambi (July 19 – October 4, 1942)
- José Carioca (October 11, 1942 – October 1, 1944)
- Panchito (October 8, 1944 – October 7, 1945)

The Silly Symphony Sunday strip ended on October 7, 1945, and was replaced by Uncle Remus and His Tales of Br'er Rabbit.

Three of the Silly Symphony stories inspired long-running features in Walt Disney's Comics and Stories. Original Bucky Bug stories first appeared in issue #39 (Dec 1943) and appeared every month for seven years, wrapping up with issue #120 (Sept 1950). "The Three Little Pigs" feature inspired the creation of Li'l Bad Wolf, the Big Bad Wolf's errant son, who wants to be friends with the Pigs. Li'l Bad Wolf's adventures began in issue #52 (Jan 1945), and he made regular appearances until almost the end of the comic's original run, issue #259 (April 1962). Finally, Little Hiawatha had his own monthly story for two years, from issue #143 (Aug 1952) to #168 (September 1954).

The complete strip has been reprinted in four hardcover collections, Silly Symphonies: The Complete Disney Classics, published by IDW Publishing's Library of American Comics imprint. The first volume, published in 2016, includes all of the strips from "Bucky Bug" (1932) to "Cookieland" (1935). Volume 2, published in 2017, includes "Three Little Kittens" (1935) to "Timid Elmer" (1939). Volume 3, published in 2018, includes "Pluto the Pup" (1939) to "Little Hiawatha" (1942). The fourth volume, published in 2019, concludes the series with "Bambi" (1942) through Panchito" (1945).

=== Donald Duck ===
Donald Duck made his first comics appearance in the Silly Symphony adaptation of the 1934 Disney short The Wise Little Hen (Sept. 16, 1934-Dec. 16, 1934). As Donald's popularity grew, he became the star of the Silly Symphony strip for an extended run (August 1936 to December 1937), and then got his own daily strip starting on February 7, 1938. A Donald Sunday strip premiered December 10, 1939. Carl Barks, known to fans as "The Duck Man," wrote at least 20 of the strips between 1938 and 1940. Donald Duck ran until May 2005, when it went into reprints.

Starting in 2015, IDW Publishing's Library of American Comics imprint has been publishing hardcover collections of the Donald Duck strip. As of 2019, five volumes of Donald Duck: The Complete Daily Newspaper Comics and two volumes of Donald Duck: The Complete Sunday Comics have been released.

=== Uncle Remus and His Tales of Br'er Rabbit ===
Uncle Remus and His Tales of Br'er Rabbit was launched as a Sunday strip on October 14, 1945, as a preview of the upcoming 1946 film Song of the South. The Uncle Remus strip began, like Silly Symphony, as a topper for the Mickey Mouse strip, but after the first few years, almost always appeared on its own.

The previous comic strip adaptations of Disney films lasted for four or five months, but the Uncle Remus strip continued for almost thirty years, telling new stories of Br'er Rabbit and friends, until the strip was discontinued on December 31, 1972.

=== Walt Disney's Treasury of Classic Tales ===
In 1950, Disney distributed a limited-time Sunday strip adaptations of their new animated feature Cinderella, and followed the next year with Alice in Wonderland. Judged a success, the experiment was turned into an ongoing feature in 1952—Walt Disney's Treasury of Classic Tales—beginning with The Story of Robin Hood.

The Sunday strip ran for thirty-five years, from July 13, 1952, to February 15, 1987. The animated features adapted for the strip include Peter Pan (1953), Lady and the Tramp (1955), Sleeping Beauty (1958), The Sword in the Stone (1963) and The Jungle Book (1968). Classic Tales also featured animated shorts, including Lambert the Sheepish Lion (1956) and Ben and Me (1953), and featurettes like Peter & The Wolf (1954) and Winnie the Pooh and the Honey Tree (1966). The 1979-80 adaptation of The Black Hole was particularly notable for featuring pencil art by comics icon Jack Kirby, with Mike Royer inking.

Treasury of Classic Tales also adapted live-action films like Old Yeller (1957–58), Swiss Family Robinson (1960), Mary Poppins (1964) and The Love Bug (1969). The strip transitioned from historical dramas like The Sword and the Rose (1953) and Kidnapped (1960) to comedies like The Shaggy Dog (1959) and The Parent Trap (1961).

In 2016, IDW Publishing and their imprint The Library of American Comics (LoAC) began to collect all the Treasury of Classic Tales stories in a definitive hardcover reprint series. As of 2019, three volumes have been published, reprinting all the stories from Robin Hood (1952) through In Search of the Castaways (1962). In April 2018, it was announced that, due to the sales goal of the series not being met, the third volume may be the last one to be published.

=== Scamp ===
In 1955, the animated film Lady and the Tramp inspired a new comic strip based on an adorable, unnamed puppy glimpsed at the end of the movie. Scamp debuted in newspapers on October 31, 1955, and ran for more than 30 years, ending on June 25, 1988. The strip was created by Ward Greene, a King Features Syndicate editor who wrote the original magazine story, Happy Dan, the Whistling Dog, and Miss Patsy, the Beautiful Spaniel, which inspired the film. Greene and artist Dick Moores produced the strip for eight months as a continuing story. Starting in May 1956, other creators took over, and the strip moved to a gag-a-day format.

=== Disney Christmas Story ===
Beginning in 1960, a special daily strip with a holiday theme utilizing the Disney characters was offered each year through 1987. It generally ran for three to four weeks with the concluding strip appearing a day or two before Christmas, often promoting the latest Disney release or re-release. These were unique in that in some cases, they showcased the crossover of Disney characters that otherwise rarely interacted.

The tradition was revived in 1992 as Disney Holiday Story to publicize contemporary Disney feature animated films.

In 2017, the Christmas stories were collected in a hardback volume, Disney's Christmas Classics, published by IDW Publishing. The collection includes all of the Christmas stories except for 1986's story based on Song of the South.

=== Winnie the Pooh ===
Disney created a Winnie the Pooh comic strip for King Features Syndicate starting June 19, 1978. Based on the Disney adaptations of the characters, the strip was written by Don Ferguson and drawn by Richard Moore. In addition to the regular cast of characters, Ferguson and Moore also added a knight named Sir Brian, and his worrywart dragon. The strip lasted for almost ten years, ending on April 2, 1988.

=== Other comic strips ===
Other Disney strips distributed over the years included (chronologically by start date):

- Merry Menagerie [humorous daily panel featuring anthropomorphic animals, but no Disney characters] (Jan. 13, 1947-March 17, 1962).
- True Life Adventures [daily panel] (March 14, 1955 – February 27, 1973)
- Mickey Mouse and His Friends [pantomime aimed at an international audience, gag strips featuring Mickey, Minnie, Goofy and Pluto] (September 1, 1958 – March 17, 1962).
- Gummi Bears (Sept. 1, 1986–April 1, 1989)

A proposed Roger Rabbit strip underwent development but cancellation of the sequel led King Features to pass on it.

The Disney comic strip department closed in January 1990. The last two strips, Mickey Mouse and Donald Duck, continued to be supervised by King Features. The Donald strip was drawn by Larry Knighton with King Features staffers writing it. The Donald strip was discontinued in the mid-1990s. In this period the Mickey strip had Floyd Norman as the writer and art rotating between Rick Hoover and Alex Howell. Norman convinced the syndicate to allow him to drop the gag-a-day format in favor of adventure continuities of up to four weeks, much in the style of the classic Gottfredson era. By 1994 the strip was running in only 30 newspapers and by mutual agreement of Disney and King Features it ended. Both strips continued with reprints.

In recent years Creators Syndicate has offered reprints of the Donald Duck, Mickey Mouse and Winnie the Pooh strips as part of a "classics" package and posts the current strip on its site (without archiving). Domestically the strips have 20-30 clients at any one time; they also appear in many newspapers outside the United States (exact number unknown).

== U.S. comic books ==
=== Mickey Mouse Magazine ===
Mickey Mouse Magazine (1933–1940) was the first Disney comics publication, and preceded the popular 1940 anthology comic book Walt Disney's Comics and Stories. The concept was created by Kay Kamen, a Disney merchandiser. There were three versions of the title: two promotional giveaway magazines published from 1933 to 1935, and a newsstand magazine published from 1935 to 1940. The publication gradually evolved from a 16-page booklet of illustrated text stories and single-page comic panels into a 64-page comic book featuring reprints of the Mickey Mouse and Donald Duck comic strips.

=== Walt Disney's Comics and Stories ===
In October 1940, Western rebranded Mickey Mouse Magazine as Walt Disney's Comics and Stories, an anthology comic book series featuring an assortment of Disney characters, including Donald Duck, Scrooge McDuck, Mickey Mouse, Chip 'n' Dale, Li'l Bad Wolf, Scamp, Bucky Bug, Grandma Duck, Brer Rabbit, Winnie the Pooh, and others. With more than 700 issues, Walt Disney's Comics & Stories is the longest-running Disney comic book in the United States.

By the mid-1950s, WDC&S was the best selling comic book in America, with a circulation hovering around three million a month (with the highest level reached being 3,038,000 for the Sept. 1953 issue). It is regarded as one of the best-selling comic books of all time.

The book was originally published by Dell Comics (1940–1962), and there have been many revivals over the years, continuing the same legacy numbering. The revivals have been published by Gold Key Comics (1962–1984), Gladstone Publishing (1986–1990), Disney Comics (1990–1993), back to Gladstone Publishing (1993–1999), Gemstone Publishing (2003–2008), Boom! Studios (2009–2011) and IDW Publishing (2015–2020). IDW relaunched the title as Disney Comics and Stories. IDW lost Disney comics rights in the 2020s and the comic book license for Disney properties passed to Marvel Comics.

=== Four Color ===
When Walt Disney's Comics and Stories launched in 1940 as a partnership between Dell Comics and Western Publishing, the comic only reprinted existing Mickey Mouse, Donald Duck and Silly Symphony comic strips, rather than creating original stories specifically for the comic book form. This was common for comic books at the time.

Dell also had an anthology series, Four Color, which started in 1939 as a series of "one-shot" specials, each focused on a particular character. In the early days, Four Color mostly featured comic strip reprints of Dick Tracy, Little Orphan Annie, Terry and the Pirates and others. The first series included two issues of Disney comic strips -- Donald Duck strips were reprinted in issue #4 (Feb 1940), and Gottfredson's Mickey Mouse serial Mickey Mouse Outwits the Phantom Blot was colored, reformatted into comic form and released as issue #16 (1941).

In 1941, Four Color published the two earliest Disney comic book stories, based on new Disney films. Issue #13 featured an adaptation of The Reluctant Dragon, and a Dumbo adaptation was the focus of issue #17. Both of these stories were assembled by using a film-editing machine called the Moviola, and having artist Irving Tripp trace the actual frames of the film to make up each panel. Each issue also had additional short back-up features—the Reluctant Dragon issue included comic adaptations of the 1941 shorts Old MacDonald Duck and Goofy's How to Ride a Horse, and Dumbo of the Circus had an illustrated text adaptation of the Donald Duck short The Village Smithy, as well as some filler comic strips from Silly Symphony and Mickey Mouse.

The next story specifically created for Disney comic books was Pluto Saves the Ship, published in Dell Comics' Large Feature Comics #7 in July 1942. The story was written by Disney animators Carl Barks, Jack Hannah and Nick George; it was Barks's first comic book work.

Four Color relaunched with a new numbering system in 1942, and in October, Dell published "Donald Duck Finds Pirate Gold" as issue #9 of the second series. This 64-page story was the first Donald Duck story drawn (but not yet written) by Barks.

Four Color went on to produce more than 1,000 issues from 1942 to 1962, and the major ongoing Disney comics series were all launched as individual issues of the Four Color series. "Donald Duck Finds Pirate Gold" eventually became the first Donald Duck comic, Mickey Mouse began as issue #27 (1943), and the first Uncle Scrooge comic was issue #386 (March 1952). Scamp also began as a Four Color one-shot with issue #703 (May 1956), which turned into a series in 1958. When they each "graduated" to their own comic books, Dell continued their numbering as if they had been part of a series all along.

There were many other Disney characters featured in issues of Four Color. This list shows the first issue for each character:

- Bambi: issue #12 (1942)
- Thumper: issue #19 (1943)
- Bambi's Children: issue #30 (1943)
- Snow White and the Seven Dwarfs: issue #49 (1944)
- The Three Caballeros: issue #71 (1945)
- Pinocchio: issue #92 (Jan 1946)
- Uncle Remus and His Tales of Br'er Rabbit: issue #129 (Dec 1946)
- Three Little Pigs: issue #218 (March 1949)
- Cinderella: issue #272 (April 1950)
- Alice in Wonderland: issue #331 (May 1951)
- Duck Album: issue 353 (Nov 1951)
- Li'l Bad Wolf: issue #403 (June 1952)
- Pluto: issue #429 (Oct 1952)
- Little Hiawatha: issue #439 (Dec 1952)
- Peter Pan: issue #442 (Dec 1952)
- Goofy: issue #468 (May 1953)
- Chip 'n' Dale: issue #517 (Nov 1953)
- Daisy Duck's Diary: issue 600 (Nov 1954)
- Lady and the Tramp: issue 629 (May 1955)
- Dumbo: issue #668 (Dec 1955)
- Jiminy Cricket: issue #701 (May 1956)
- Bongo and Lumpjaw: issue #706 (June 1956)
- Grandma Duck's Farm Friends: issue #763 (Jan 1957)
- The Adventures of Tinker Bell: issue #896 (April 1958)
- Sleeping Beauty: issue #973 (May 1959)
- Sleeping Beauty's Fairy Godmothers: issue #984 (April 1959)
- Vacation in Disneyland: issue #1025 (Aug 1959)
- Gyro Gearloose: issue #1047 (Nov 1959)

=== Donald Duck ===
Donald Duck (1942–2017) first appeared as part of the Four Color one-shot series, beginning in issue #9 (Oct 1942). Carl Barks, the first great figure among Disney comic book creators, wrote all of his early long stories for the Donald Duck one-shots, including Donald Duck and the Mummy's Ring (1943), The Terror of the River! (1946), Volcano Valley (1947), The Ghost of the Grotto (1947), Christmas on Bear Mountain (1947), The Old Castle's Secret (1948), Sheriff of Bullet Valley (1948), Lost in the Andes! (1949), Voodoo Hoodoo (1949) and Luck of the North (1949).

The title received its own numbering system with issue #26 (1953) and ended with issue #388 (June 2017).

=== Mickey Mouse ===
Mickey Mouse (1943–2017) first appeared as part of the Four Color one-shot series, beginning in issue #27 (1943). It received its own numbering system with issue #28 (December 1952), and after many iterations with various publishers, ended with #330 (June 2017) from IDW Publishing.

=== Dell Giants ===
In 1949, Dell began a tradition of publishing occasional "Disney Giants", plus-size comic books with more pages and a higher price. The first Giant was Walt Disney's Christmas Parade #1 (Nov 1949). This was a 132-page square-bound comic that sold for 25 cents, considerably higher than the typical 10-cent comics. Christmas Parade had a cover by Walt Kelly, and began with a Carl Barks-penned Donald Duck story, "Letter to Santa".

Christmas Parade was a success, and Dell followed up the next year with Walt Disney's Vacation Parade #1 (July 1950) and Christmas Parade #2 (Nov 1950). Dell also introduced Bugs Bunny's Christmas Funnies in 1950, and soon all of Dell's top-selling characters had regular annuals and giant issues.

Christmas Parade ran for ten issues from 1949 to 1959, and was followed by Walt Disney's Merry Christmas (Dec 1960) and Donald Duck Merry Christmas (Dec 1961).

Vacation Parade ran for five annual issues from 1950 to 1954, before being retitled Picnic Party from 1955 to 1957, Mickey Mouse Summer Fun (1958), Walt Disney's Summer Fun (1959), Daisy Duck and Uncle Scrooge Picnic Time (1960) and Mickey and Donald in Vacationland (1961). There were also six annual issues of Donald Duck Beach Party from 1954 to 1959.

Dell also published nine annual issues of Silly Symphonies (1952–1959).

When Disneyland, the first Disney theme park, opened in 1955, Dell celebrated with the Giant Donald Duck in Disneyland (Sept 1955), and made frequent returns to the park over the next few years, including Mickey Mouse in Frontierland (May 1956), Mickey Mouse in Fantasyland (May 1957), Uncle Scrooge Goes to Disneyland (Aug 1957), Christmas in Disneyland (a one-time retitle of Christmas Parade, Nov 1957) Donald and Mickey in Disneyland on Tom Sawyer Island (May 1958), Vacation in Disneyland (Aug 1958), Disneyland Birthday Party (Oct 1958) and Disneyland U.S.A. (June 1960).

There were also three annual issues of Huey, Dewey and Louie Back To School in October 1959, 1960 and 1961, and a number of one-shot Giants, including Peter Pan's Treasure Chest (Jan 1953), Mickey Mouse Birthday Party (Sept 1953), Mickey Mouse Club Parade (Dec 1955), Mickey Mouse Almanac (Dec 1957) and Daisy Duck and Uncle Scrooge Showboat (Sept 1961).

=== Uncle Scrooge ===
Carl Barks introduced Donald's Uncle Scrooge in the story "Christmas on Bear Mountain", published in Four Color #178 (Dec 1947). Scrooge made regular returns to both the Donald Duck comic and Barks's stories in Walt Disney's Comics and Stories over the next few years, and he finally received his own title in Four Color #386 (March 1952).

The spin-off title was very popular, and by issue #4 Uncle Scrooge shed its Four Color association and became its own independent book. Scrooge is one of the longest-running American Disney comics books, and is still presently ongoing, reaching issue #450 in June 2019.

The book has been produced under the aegis of several different publishers, including Western Publishing (initially in association with Dell Comics and later under its own subsidiary, Gold Key Comics and its Whitman imprint), Gladstone Publishing, Disney Comics, Gemstone Publishing, Boom! Studios, and IDW Publishing (until 2020), and has undergone several hiatuses of varying length. Despite this, it has maintained the same numbering scheme throughout its six decade history, with only IDW adding a secondary numbering that started at #1.

=== Gold Key / Whitman era ===
By the late 1950s, relations between Dell and Western had become strained. Former Western writer Mark Evanier states part of this was due to "... a small battle going on between the two companies over the ownership of properties in non-licensed comics." In 1962 Western, ended the partnership and continued their comic book line under the Gold Key Comics label. Comic book historian Joe Torcivia has dubbed the mid-1960s "... a period of creativity for Western Publishing's Disney line not seen since its formation, and never seen again."

Western continued publishing Dell's four main titles: Walt Disney's Comics and Stories (starting with issue #264, Sept 1962), Mickey Mouse (issue #85, Nov 1962), Donald Duck (issue #85, Dec 1962) and Uncle Scrooge (issue #40, Jan 1963). They also started (or restarted) several titles:

- The Beagle Boys (47 issues, 1964–1979)
- The Phantom Blot (7 issues, 1964–1966)
- Chip 'n' Dale (83 issues, 1967–1984)
- Moby Duck (30 issues, 1967–1978)
- Scamp (45 issues, 1967–1979)
- O'Malley and the Alley Cats (9 issues, 1971–1974)
- Daisy and Donald (59 issues, 1973–1984)
- Winnie the Pooh (33 issues, 1977–1984)
- The Beagle Boys vs Uncle Scrooge (12 issues, 1979–1980)
- Huey, Dewey and Louie: Junior Woodchucks (81 issues, 1966–1984)
- Moby Duck (30 issues, 1967–1978)
- Ludwig Von Drake (4 issues, 1961–1962)
- Super Goof (74 issues, 1965–1984)

By the 1970s, Disney comics were undergoing a steep decline in circulation, with newsstand distribution discontinued in 1981. Western thereafter released its comics under the Whitman label, distributing them to candy stores and other outlets in bags containing three comics and also eventually distributed them to the emerging network of comic book stores. Western ceased publishing comics in 1984.

=== Disney Studio Program ===
From 1962 to 1990 the Walt Disney Studio had a unit producing comic book stories exclusively for foreign consumption, the Disney Studio Program, in response to complaints of foreign comic book licensees that Western Publishing was producing fewer stories that they could reprint.

Many European publishers saw a great demand for Disney comics, and it was a typical pattern for a company to publish a comic once a month, then add regular specials, then phase out the specials and publish the comic biweekly, and finally turn it into a weekly magazine. France's Le Journal de Mickey and the Netherlands' Donald Duck Weekblad started the trend, publishing weekly comics in 1952, and the others followed in the late 1950s. Germany's Micky Maus turned weekly in 1957, Denmark's Anders And & Co. in 1958, Sweden's Kalle Anka & C:o in 1959, and Italy's Topolino in 1960. By the early 1960s, the weeklies' voracious need for material was using up the available inventory of stories.

George Sherman, head of Disney's Publications Department at the time, hired Tom Golberg to run the program. Sherman noted the purpose of the program was "We [will] use new characters in our foreign comics, characters that we don't have [in the United States].... to bring out facets of existing characters, [and to] give the stories more variety."

Tony Strobl, Cliff Voorhees, Al Hubbard, Paul Murry, Jack Bradbury, Carson Van Osten, Ellis Eringer and Romano Scarpa were among the artists during its early years; Carl Fallberg, Floyd Norman, Ed Nofziger, Cecil Beard, Jim Fanning, Dick Kinney, Diana Gabaldon and Mark Evanier were among those who at some point did scripts for it. From the late 1970s on, the Jaime Diaz Studios of Argentina drew most of the stories.

In a few instances, Studio Program stories were reprinted in the United States in promotional giveaways of Gulf Oil (Wonderful World of Disney) in the late 1960s and Procter & Gamble (Disney Magazine) in the mid-1970s. Mickey and the Sleuth stories were published by Gold Key in Walt Disney Showcase #38, 39 and 42 (1977–1978). Besides the Sleuth, other characters created for the program include Donald's cousin Fethry Duck and the hillbilly hermit Hard Haid Moe. Also, while Carl Barks created John D. Rockerduck, he used the character only in a single story ("Boat Buster", Walt Disney's Comics and Stories #255, Dec. 1961) while the program subsequently created numerous stories with the Scrooge McDuck rival and helped refine him (along with stories by Brazilian and Italian Disney comic book licensees).

Domestic printing of Studio Program stories became common starting in the late 1980s as the Disney comics published by Gladstone and Gemstone have featured them on a regular basis, along with reprints from Gold Key/Dell and material produced by foreign licensees.

This program was merged into Disney Comics, and is the precursor of the comics that subsequently appeared in Disney Adventures.

=== Revivals ===
Starting in 1986, Disney comics in the United States were published by Gladstone Publishing (a subsidiary of Another Rainbow Publishing dedicated solely to Carl Barks). Impressed by Gladstone's unanticipated success, Disney revoked their license in 1990 to publish the comics themselves by the subsidiary W. D. Publications, Inc. under the name "Disney Comics", and a large expansion was planned. However, following the Disney Implosion in 1991, Disney gradually returned licensing to Gladstone again (for the classic characters) and Marvel Comics (for the modern characters, and which would be later sold to Disney in 2009). Respectively, reprints of classic Barks stories were licensed to Gladstone again from 1991, while it took Gladstone until the demise of Disney Comics in 1993 to regain a license also for other stories containing the classic characters. Gladstone from then on remained publishing Disney comics until 1998.

In 2003, after a few years' hiatus, regular publication was restarted by Gemstone Publishing, a reformed version of Gladstone. Gemstone's two monthly Disney titles were Walt Disney's Comics and Stories and Uncle Scrooge, but the license was not renewed with the last releases dated Nov. 2008.

More recently, Disney licensed some of their modern properties to Slave Labor Graphics (Gargoyles) and BOOM! Kids (The Muppet Show, The Incredibles, and Cars). Boom eventually also got the license for the classic characters, and began publishing comic books with them in 2009. Although cancelling two titles previously published by Gladstone and Gemstone (Donald Duck Adventures and Uncle $crooge Adventures), Boom! expanded their Disney portfolio in 2010-'11 by launching three new titles based upon the 1990s Disney Afternoon TV format (Darkwing Duck, Chip 'n Dale Rescue Rangers, and DuckTales). However, in August 2011, it was reported that Disney and Boom! were to end the licensing agreement, leaving the future of comics including their classic characters as well as those from the Disney Afternoon format uncertain.

In October 2014, Comic Book Resources (CBR) reported that Joe Books, a small new Canadian publisher founded by former BOOM! vice president Adam Fortier, had acquired the rights to a "remastered" omnibus reprint of BOOM's entire Darkwing Duck comic series that would lead into an all-new on-going Darkwing Duck series produced by Joe Comics, and in February 2015, CBR ran an interview with series artist James Silvani and series writer Aaron Sparrow on the new "remastered" omnibus collection published by Joe Books that month, as well as their plans for the announced new series. As the November 2014 edition of the Overstreet Comic Book Price Guide also contained ads for Joe Books comic adaptations of two theatrical Disney features, observers have expressed rumors that Joe Books has acquired the full North-American comic license to all Disney animated and live-action properties.

In January 2015, IDW Publishing announced on their public Facebook account that they were to start publishing all the classic-characters Disney titles, starting with Uncle $crooge in April of that year and focussing on reprints of European Disney comics with these characters by artists such as Marco Rota and Romano Scarpa. The rights to North-American reprints of Carl Barks and Don Rosa comics are currently (2015) held by Fantagraphics Books.

Disney has also begun publishing a bimonthly magazine based on Phineas and Ferb, featuring comic stories based on the show. Between 1999 and 2005, Dark Horse Comics published occasional adaptations of Disney's new movies.

The Disney Studio launched Kingdom Comics division in May 2008 led by writer-actor Ahmet Zappa, TV executive Harris Katleman and writer-editor Christian Beranek. Kingdom was designed to create new properties for possible film development and reimagine and redevelop existing Disney library movies with Disney Publishing Worldwide getting a first look for publishing.

Peachtree Playthings in Marietta, Georgia, published several issues of Mickey Mouse, Frozen, DuckTales, Toy Story and Disney Princess in 2019–20. Dynamite Entertainment in Mt. Laurel, New Jersey, began publishing a new monthly Darkwing Duck series in January 2023. Dynamite also publishes comic books featuring Scar, Maleficent, Gargoyles, Cruella De Vil and Lilo & Stitch.

Fantagraphics in Seattle, Washington, began publishing a new monthly Uncle Scrooge series in 2025 and new monthly Mickey Mouse and Donald Duck series in 2026.

=== Disney Afternoon comics ===
There have been many comic books based on the popular 1990–1997 "Disney Afternoon" slate of afternoon television cartoon series:

- Chip 'n Dale: Rescue Rangers
  - Disney Comics: 19 issues (1990–1991)
  - Boom!: 8 issues (2010–2011)
- Darkwing Duck
  - Disney Comics: 4 issues (1991–1992)
  - Boom!: 18 issues & 1 Annual (2010–2011)
  - Joe Books: 8 issues (2016–2017)
  - Peachtree Playthings: 5 issues (2019–20)
  - Dynamite Entertainment (2023)
- DuckTales
  - Gladstone: 13 issues (1988–1990)
  - Disney Comics: 18 issues (1990–1991)
  - Boom!: 6 issues (2011)
  - IDW: ongoing (2017–18)
  - Peachtree Playthings: 5 issues (2019–20)
- Gargoyles
  - Marvel Comics: 11 issues (1995)
  - Slave Labor Comics: 12 issues (2006–08) [#9-12 TPB-only]
  - Slave Labor Comics: Gargoyles: Bad Guys: 6 issues (2007–08) [#5/6 TPB-only]
- TaleSpin
  - Disney Comics: 4-issue miniseries and 7-issue series (1991)

=== More comic books ===
Notable American Disney comic book writers and artists include Carl Barks, Tony Strobl, Paul Murry, William Van Horn, and Don Rosa.

Disney comic titles in the United States include:

- Donald and Mickey (1945–1949, 1987–1990, 1993–1997, 2017–?) [*Note: originally a giveaway comic (alternate titles = Mickey & Donald/Donald Duck & Mickey Mouse)]
- Huey, Dewey and Louie Junior Woodchucks (1966–1984)
- Walt Disney Comics Digest (1968–1976)
- Uncle Scrooge Adventures (1987–1990, 1993–1997)
- Donald Duck Adventures (1988–1990, 1993–1998, 2003–2006)
- Mickey Mouse Adventures (1990–1991, 2004–2006)
- Walt Disney Giant (1995–1996)

== Europe ==
=== United Kingdom ===
Disney comics first appeared in the United Kingdom in the Mickey Mouse Annual, which published 18 editions between 1930 and 1947. The books were published by Dean & Son, and illustrated by Wilfred Haughton.

Inspired by the 1935 launch of the newsstand-version of Mickey Mouse Magazine, UK publisher Odhams Press established Mickey Mouse Weekly, a large-size 12-page comics magazine, with four pages in full-color photogravure. Wilfred Haughton contributed to this publication as well, which featured the full range of characters from the Mickey Mouse and Silly Symphony cartoons. The magazine included new material—both Disney and non-Disney—as well as reprints of the American comic strips. Mickey Mouse Weekly featured the first ever Donald Duck comic book serial, originally called Donald and Donna, which began in issue #67 (May 15, 1937), drawn by William A. Ward. There were 15 weekly parts of this first serial featuring Donald and his girlfriend Donna, an early version of Daisy Duck. Donna left the series after the first story, which was continued as Donald Duck, Donald and Mac and Donald Duck with Mac for the next three years, ending in issue #222 (May 4, 1940). Goofy and Toby Tortoise also had their own strip, The Defective Agency, and so did Elmer Elephant, Pinocchio, Thumper and the mice from Cinderella, Jaq and Gus. The popular magazine ended in 1957, after 920 issues, because of a copyright dispute with Disney. Ronald Nielsen had been producing painted comic book pages in Floyd Gottfredson's 1940s style, as well as of characters from Disney animated films, during the mid-1950s until the magazine lost its license.

Immediately after the close of Mickey Mouse Weekly, another Disney comics magazine was launched: Walt Disney's Mickey Mouse, which ran for 55 issues from 1958 to 1959, and then changed title to Walt Disney's Weekly, publishing another 111 issues until 1961.

Other Disney comics published in the UK include:

- Disneyland Magazine (1971–1976)
- Donald and Mickey (1972–1975)
- Goofy (and also Pluto) (1973–1974); merged as Donald and Mickey (and also Goofy)
- Mickey Mouse (1975–1981)
- Donald Duck (IPC Magazines) (1975–1976)
- Donald Duck (London Editions) (1987–1990)
- Mickey Mouse and Friends (1989–1990)
- The Disney Weekly (1991–1992)
- Mickey and Friends (1992–1996)

Of contributors to American Disney comics who were born in the UK, Ted Thwaites was an inker for Floyd Gottfredson in the early Disney comic strip department, and Frank McSavage from Scotland drew a number of Grandma Duck, Bongo and other stories for the American comic books.

British writers for Egmont include Paul Halas, Gail Renard and Jack Sutter.

British Webcomic creator Sarah Jolley has introduced a romance between Gladstone Gander and Magica De Spell. Her popular online comics, that she calls 'duck doodles', have won praise from Disney artists.

=== Scandinavia ===
==== Denmark ====
Danish publisher Egmont (previously Gutenberghus) has one of the largest productions of Disney comics in the world. This production is not only for Denmark proper, but nearly identical magazines are being published simultaneously every week for all the Nordic countries, Germany (see below), and since the fall of the Berlin Wall in 1989, Eastern Europe. The Danish company started publishing their own series in the early 1960s. Most of Egmont's content has come from several outside sources: reprints of classic Carl Barks stories, reprinted Barks-style stories from the Netherlands, American artist-writers such as Don Rosa and William Van Horn, and the outsourced production of art for Egmont's scripts from Barks-style artists' studios, such as Vicar in Chile, Daniel Branca in Argentina and several studios in Spain. Italian stories are often featured in digest-formatted pocket books.

Artists from Denmark include Freddy Milton (penname of Fredy Milton Larsen), who worked for the Dutch studio with Daan Jippes, and Flemming Andersen who draws in a personalized version of the Italian Disney style. In addition to Donald Duck stories, Freddy Milton has utilized his highly Barks-reminiscent style for other series that he has written and drawn, including Woody Woodpecker, his own series, Gnuff, and several titles involving a human character named Villiams Verden. The Scandinavian countries are among those in which Donald Duck is more popular than Mickey Mouse. Danish writers include Lars Jensen, Maya Åstrup, Tom Anderson and Gorm Transgaard (Jensen created Scrooge's opponent Velma Vanderduck, amongst other characters).

Disney titles published in Denmark include:

- Anders And & Co. (Donald Duck & Co.) (1949–present): The flagship magazine launched in March 1949 as a monthly, which became bi-weekly in 1956, and weekly in 1958. The weekly publishes new Disney stories produced by Egmont.
- Solo-hæfte (One-Shots) (1953–1956): A series of "one-shot" comics similar to Dell's Four Color; reprinted much U.S. material of the 1940s and ’50s.
- Walt Disney's månedshæfte (Walt Disney's Monthly Issue) (1967–1970): Another series reprinting a range of American stories.
- Jumbobog (1968–present): The popular pocket book format was launched in Denmark in 1968, and translated/distributed in many other European countries. This is a 250-page monthly paperback that publishes mostly Italian stories, as well as new stories produced for Egmont.
- Anders And Ekstra (1977–2014): A monthly magazine launched in 1977, which used to publish new extra-long stories, but then moved to mostly reprints.

==== Sweden ====
Sweden was the first Scandinavian country to publish a Disney comic book—the flagship comic Kalle Anka & C:o (Donald Duck & Co), which started in September 1948. The comic began as a monthly, became bimonthly in 1957, and then a weekly magazine in July 1959. The comic is now identical to Anders And & C:o from Denmark and Donald Duck & C:o from Norway. All are published by the Scandinavian corporate group founded in 1878 as Gutenberghus; the name changed to Egmont in 1992. The Finnish Aku Ankka is published separately, but is largely the same.

In the 1950s, Swedish Disney comics reprinted existing material from America, both in Kalle Anka & C:o and a monthly series, Walt Disney's serier (Walt Disney's Comics). When the supply of American comics started to dry up in the 1960s, Denmark's publishing house Gutenberghus began producing original series, followed by Italy's Mondadori and Disney's own "Disney Studio" program. The pocket book Kalle Anka's Pocket was introduced in 1968, and is still running today. A second pocket book, Farbror Joakim (Uncle Scrooge) was added in 1976. In 1980, Musse Pigg & C:o (Mickey Mouse & Co) was added as a monthly comic, and it continues as a bimonthly. Other current titles are Kalle Anka Extra and Kalle Anka Junior.

Per Erik Hedman is a writer from Sweden, and artist Tony Cronstam draws in a Carl Barks style. Editor/writer Stefan Printz-Påhlson wrote a time machine series with fellow editor/writer Lars Bergström; the former also created the reoccurring Stone Age character, Princess Oona. Per Starbäck compiled Disney comic book indexes into the Disney Comics Mailing List, expanded by Dutch programmer Harry Fluks into the online database, Inducks.

==== Finland ====
Thanks to a multitalented editor, Markku Kivekäs, who was also a skilled translator, essayist and restorationist, comic book stories about Donald Duck, along with the work of Carl Barks, became extremely popular in Finland, more so than in any other country in the world (per capita), and are accepted as part of the mainstream culture. It was estimated in 2002, that a quarter of the population of Finland was reading the Donald Duck magazine, Aku Ankka. Like the Netherlands, Finland publishes their own Disney comics apart from Egmont. Cameos of local celebrities are common. Kari Korhonen has mostly drawn in a Barksian style and also writes some of the stories he illustrates. Songwriter Tuomas Holopainen has written and composed a Scrooge McDuck comic book soundtrack that went Gold, Music Inspired by the Life and Times of Scrooge.

==== Norway ====
Norway has the comic Donald Duck & Co, which started back in 1948 and is still active. There are several pocket books, amongst them being Donald Pocket from 1968 to the present day. Mickey Mouse also had a comic, specifically Mikke Mus månedshefte (Mickey Mouse monthly booklet) which lasted from 1980 until 2009.

Arild Midthun is a Norwegian artist who works in a Barksian style. He has written some of the stories that he has drawn, as well as illustrating stories by other Norwegian writers. Midthun has created popular stories about Viking history, and about Scrooge's days in the Klondike gold rush. Carl Barks books, clubs and fanzines first appeared in Norway, the home of Donaldism, a Disney comics fandom movement founded by analyst Jon Gisle (1st fanzine, 1973; 1st club, 1975).

=== Italy ===
Italy is a major source for original Disney comic stories. The first Italian Disney comics were published in the early 1930s, and Federico Pedrocchi wrote and illustrated the first Italian Donald Duck adventure comic as early as 1937—a story called "Paolino Paperino e il mistero di Marte" ("Donald Duck and the Secret of Mars") in the weekly paper Paperino e altre avventure (Donald Duck and Other Adventures).

Italy has introduced several new characters to the Disney universe, including Donald's superhero alter ego Duck Avenger (original name Paperinik), created in 1969. Production has been handled by Nerbini (1932–1937), Mondadori (1937–1988), Disney Italy (1988–2013) and Panini Comics (2013–present).

Topolino is the main Italian Disney publication, and its first incarnation was a weekly newspaper published from 1932 to 1949, for a total of 738 issues. In 1949, Topolino switched to a digest-sized format and its numbering restarted at #1: originally a monthly, it became a biweekly in 1952 and a weekly in 1960. The second incarnation of Topolino reached its 3500th issue in 2022. At first, Topolino alternated between translations of foreign stories and original stories produced by Italian authors, however since the early 1990s foreign stories have mostly disappeared from it.

Italy's digest-sized format has been adopted by many other countries in the long running Donald Duck pocket book series.

In the late 1990s, Disney Italy launched several new lines, including PKNA: Paperinik New Adventures (a comic book version of Paperinik aimed at a slightly older audience), MM Mickey Mouse Mystery Magazine (a noir series starring Mickey Mouse as detective), Wizards of Mickey, DoubleDuck, and W.I.T.C.H., plus the comics published under the imprint Buena Vista Comics (including the original Monster Allergy comic series and a few other titles, such as Kylion and a comic inspired by the Alias TV show).

The Disney comics published in Italy include:

- Topolino giornale (newspaper) (1932–1949)
- I tre porcellini (The Three Little Pigs) (1935–1937)
- Paperino e altre avventure (Donald Duck and Other Adventures) (1937–1940)
- Topolino libretto (comic) (1949–present)
- Almanacco Topolino (1957–present)
- I Classici di Walt Disney (Walt Disney Classics) (1957–present)
- Zio Paperone (Uncle Scrooge) (1988–2008)
- Paperinik (Donald Duck's superhero identity) (1993–2005)
- PKNA: Paperinik New Adventures (1996–2001)
- MM Mickey Mouse Mystery Magazine (1999–2001)
- W.I.T.C.H. (2001–2012)
- PK² (2001–2002)
- PK - Pikappa (2002–2005)
- Monster Allergy (2003–2015)
- Paperinik Cult (2005–2011)
- Paperinik Appgrade (2012–2016)
- Paperinik (2017–present)
- Zio Paperone (Uncle Scrooge) (2018–present)

=== Netherlands ===
The Netherlands (current publisher: DPG Media) has a significant school of Disney comics. The first Dutch Disney comics appeared in 1953. In 1975, Daan Jippes became the art director for production of these comics, and created a heavily Barks-inspired line that remains the best-known Dutch Disney style. Donald Duck is the most popular Disney character in the Netherlands, but Sanoma also produces comics starring lesser-known characters such as Li'l Bad Wolf. Other productive Dutch artists who have worked in a Barksian style include Mark De Jonge, Sander Gulien, brothers Bas and Mau Heymans and Ben Verhagen. Freddy Milton from Denmark also worked with Jippes as a team for both scripts and art. Wilma Van Den Bosch produced art for a Dutch Daisy Duck title. Frank Jonker and Jan Kruse, among others, have provided scripts.

The Disney comics published in the Netherlands include:

- Donald Duck Weekblad (1952–present), the flagship weekly magazine, first published on October 25, 1952. The magazine was originally published by the staff of the women's magazine Margriet, and every Margriet subscriber received the first issue for free. The comic is mainly aimed at younger children, and includes a letters page from readers. In 2019, the magazine reached its 3,500th issue.
- Donald Duck Pocket (1970–present), a 250-page pocket book that prints mostly comics from Italy, featuring characters that don't usually appear in Dutch comics, like Superdonald/Fantomerik, Otto von Drakenstein, John Rockerduck, Brigitta, Indiana Goofy and DD Dubbelduck. This became a monthly publication in 2006. These books are the same pocket books published by Egmont in the Netherlands.
- Donald Duck Extra (1982–present), a monthly magazine featuring longer or more unusual stories. Don Rosa's "The Life and Times of Scrooge McDuck" stories ran in the Extra, as did William Van Horn and Marco Rota stories. The magazine started in February 1982 as Stripgoed, but changed to Donald Duck Extra with issue #37.
- Donald Duck Dubbelpocket (1996–present), a 500-page pocket book that's twice as large as the regular Donald Duck Pocket book. Originally published twice a year, the book was increased to four times a year in 2006.
- Katrien (1999–present), a monthly magazine for girls aged 8–12, starring Katrien (Daisy Duck) and her three nieces Lizzy, Juultje and Babetje (April, May and June). The comic first appeared on July 19, 1999, as a bimonthly magazine, but became monthly in 2016.
- Donald Duck Junior (2008–present), a biweekly version of Donald Duck for younger readers, with shorter stories and bigger print.
- Disney Premium (2016–present), a special pocket book published five times a year. Each issue prints (or reprints) stories featuring one of four series: Superdonald, Mickey's Mysteries, Darkwing Duck and DubbleDuck. These are generally darker, action-oriented stories about Mickey and Donald as detectives, superheroes and secret agents.

While the Donald Duck comics thrive in the Netherlands, the audience for Mickey Mouse has been relatively weak. A monthly magazine, Mickey Maandblad, was published in several formats from 1976 to 1989, finally dropped for lack of sales.

Dutch programmer Harry Fluks created the online Disney Comics Database, Inducks (launched 1994), expanded from the Disney Comics Mailing List based in Sweden.

=== Germany ===
Mickey Mouse was a popular character in Germany since his first appearance in 1929, and a few comic strips were printed in some German newspapers (e.g. the Kölner Illustrierte Zeitung). In 1937, the Swiss Micky Maus Zeitung was published in German by Bollmann.

By 1948, the Danish magazine publisher Egmont (then called Gutenberghus) secured a license to print Disney comics in Scandinavia. In September 1951, Ehapa Verlag in Stuttgart, West Germany, a subsidiary of Egmont, started the monthly publication Micky Maus, a format similar to Walt Disney's Comics & Stories. From the start, it featured stories by Carl Barks, translated by chief editor Dr. Erika Fuchs. The comic book was published on a biweekly basis from 1956 to 1957, and from 1958 on it changed into a weekly. Renamed Micky Maus Magazin, it is still published today by the Egmont Ehapa publishing company (now in Berlin) and is the longest running comic book in Germany. In its heyday (early 1990s), its weekly circulation number rose to one million copies. In spite of the name, most stories of Micky Maus feature Donald Duck, as he is the most popular Disney character in Germany.

Many other titles have been published by the company, most notably Die tollsten Geschichten von Donald Duck ('The Best stories of Donald Duck', 1965-today), the Lustige Taschenbuch ('Funny Paperback', a digest title mostly reprinting Italian pocket books; 1967-today) and many other series.

Volker Reiche and Jan Gulbransson are local artist/writers who have worked in a Carl Barks style. Gulbransson drew an 8-part series wherein Scrooge and kin visit regional German cities and wrote/drew a 4-part series set in the Alps and a story where Scrooge finances a team in the German soccer league, and many others. Barks-fan Volker Reiche wrote and drew a batch of stories in his signature scruffy version of Barks's 1940s style. A popular graphic novel adventure series, Tales From Uncle Scrooge's Treasure Chest was conceptualized, plotted and produced by Ehapa editor Adolf Kabatek. Although the art was outsourced, it was made sure to be in a Barksian style. Ulrich Schröder relocated to Paris to become the art director of Disney Publishing Worldwide, the company's European headquarters, and has produced comic covers, story and editorial art for Disney comics in Germany and France. Schröder has worked with Dutch artist Daan Jippes.

Austrian abstract artist Gottfried Helnwein held a Barks comic art touring exhibition in Germany, that along with a similar exhibit that was being shown at the time, was seen by over half a million people (over 400,000 and over 100,000, respectively). Erika Fuchs's translation work was highly influential, and she incorporated many aspects of German culture into her translations. Many of her 'Fuchisms' have become part of the German language. The Donaldist group, D.O.N.A.L.D. claims to be the preservers of the non-commercial original Donaldism and even hold congresses, knight contributors to children's literature and infiltrate conservative newspaper columns (that members contribute) with Fuchisms.

Some of the Disney comics from Germany include:

- Micky Maus (main title, 1951–present)
- Die tollsten Geschichten von Donald Duck – Sonderheft (The Best Stories of Donald Duck, 1965–present)
- Lustiges Taschenbuch (Funny Paperback pocket book, 1967–present)
- Lustiges Tachenbuch Classic! Die Comics von Carl Barks (Funny Paparback Classic! The Comics of Carl Barks, 2019–present)

=== France ===
French-produced stories started in 1952, as a one-pager comic published in each issue of Le Journal de Mickey, drawn by Louis Santel (Tenas) and written by Pierre Fallot. After a few issues, a new series started (Mickey à travers les siècles) and continued up to 1978, drawn almost entirely by Pierre Nicolas and written by Fallot and Jean-Michel le Corfec.

Later in the beginning of the 1980s, a new production started, led by Patrice Valli and Pierre Nicolas as editors with adventures of Mickey Mouse, Uncle Scrooge, Donald Duck. Among the best artists, one recalls Claude Marin, or Claude Chebille (known as Gen-Clo), and Italian artists like Giorgio Cavazzano. Some of the best writers were Michel Motti and Pierre-Yves Gabrion. In the late 1980s up to now, an increasing number of Spanish artist from the Comicup studio provided the art, while the writing stayed to French authors.

Disney comics published in France include:

- Le Journal de Mickey (1934–present): created in October 1934 (with a break in publication from 1945 to 1952), the weekly Le Journal de Mickey is a cultural institution in France.
- Mickey Parade Géant (1966–1979, 1980–present): The first version of Mickey Parade was originally an extra supplement to Le Journal de Mickey, published irregularly by Edi-Monde. It became quarterly in 1968, and transitioned to a bimonthly comic. Edi-Monde ceased publication of Mickey Parade in 1979. In 1980, the magazine was reintroduced as a monthly by Hachette Media, who restarted the numbering. In January 2002, with issue #265, the comic became Mickey Parade Géant—a larger, thicker paperback, published bimonthly.
- Picsou Magazine (1972–present): A best-selling monthly children's magazine that includes comics about Uncle Scrooge (Picsou in French) along with video game reviews and information on new movies. In 2018, the magazine went bimonthly.

=== Spain ===
The original flagship comic was Dumbo (aka Colleción Dumbo Historietas Comicas de Walt Disney), which was published by Ediciones Recreativas S.A. (ERSA) from 1947 to 1965. Initially bimonthly, Dumbo increased frequency to approximately 40 issues a year, and the comic ran for 527 issues. Starting October 1965, ERSA rebooted with a second version of Dumbo, published monthly. The second series ran for 144 issues, until December 1976. A third series of Dumbo, published in 46 issues by Montena from July 1978 to April 1982, was released as monthly hardbound books (originally 100 pages, then dropping to 68 pages).

ESRA also published a large-format 16-page bimonthly magazine, Pato Donald, which lasted from 1965 to April 1966. ESRA rebooted with a second version of Pato Donald in May 1966, now a 36-page weekly. The second Pato Donald ran for 231 issues, until December 1975. Montena also published the weekly Don Miki for 638 issues, from October 1976 to December 1988, and Don Donald for 136 issues, from 1979 to 1985.

In September 1989, Primavera began publishing Mickey and Pato Donald; Mickey lasted for 17 issues until January 1991, and Pato Donald for 46 issues until June 1992. RBA tried to revive the line in 2002, publishing 22 issues of Mickey and 4 issues of Pato Donald.

Several comic studios in Spain produced story art for Disney comic scripts, although the production was primarily for Danish and Dutch companies, rather than Spain proper. Some artists became independent, such as Paco Rodriguez, who utilizes Daniel Branca's lively Barksian style.

=== Greece (and Cyprus) ===
The first appearance of Mickey Mouse in Greece in print appears in the magazine Kinimatografikos Astir (Κινηματογραφικός Αστήρ) in 1930.

In the newspaper I Proia (Η πρωΐα), in February 1931, the first Greek cartoon featuring Mickey Mouse was published.

In 1939, the Dimitrakos publishing house published a story by the well-known children's book author Petros Pikros, a 106-page book, titled Miki Maous and Karagiozis (Μίκι Μαους και Καραγκιόζης) and subtitled "A book for tears that come from laughter." This was the first ever Greek publication exclusively dedicated to Mickey Mouse.

The weekly Miky Maous (Μίκυ Μάους) comic was first published on July 1, 1966, and remained in print for more than 45 years, eventually being ended by struggling publisher Nea Aktina S.A. on September 6, 2013, with issue #2460-61.

Terzopoulos Publishing (renamed Nea Aktina after the death of founder Evagellos Terzopoulos) released 20 magazines, with Μικυ Μαους (Mickey Mouse) being the main, weekly magazine with stories from across the Mickey-Donald universe. Other publications were released from monthly to yearly basis, notably Ντοναλντ (Donald) and Κομιξ (Comics) featuring classic stories. Six of the publications went out of the Mickey-Donald bubble with franchises such as Winnie-the-Pooh, the Disney princesses, cars, and even Pixar's Toy Story. Moreover, two Disney magazines were released, Almanaco, focusing mainly on video games and a teen audience, including short Disney comics, also releasing Κοσμος Ντισνευ (Disney world) which included info and stories from recent Disney franchises such as The Incredibles and Hannah Montana. Another 47 standalone publications were released in the time of the publisher. By the end of 2013, 11 series were being published.

In 2014, the title was relaunched by Kathimerini, with numbering starting at #1.

Kathimerini relaunched Mickey Mouse (weekly) and Donald, Comics, Super Mickey (monthly), along with some limited edition collections bundled with the Kathimerini newspaper. The magazines nowadays mainly draw from the Italian publications. Kathimerini discontinued direct supply to Cyprus, however many stores get their hands on the comics with a middleman or a subscription.

=== Belgium ===
Louis Santel (Ténas) created new material in the 1950s.

=== Yugoslavia ===
Vlastimir Belkić produced original content in the 1930s.

== Latin America ==
=== Brazil ===
The first Mickey Mouse stories were published in Brazil in 1930, in the comics anthology O Tico Tico, under the name Ratinho Curioso (the Curious Mouse). The magazine reprinted comic strips by Floyd Gottfredson.

In Brazil, through the publisher Abril, national stories have been published since the 1950s, with artists like Jorge Kato inspired by Carl Barks. In the 1960s and 1970s, Renato Canini drew a number of stories in a style inspired by the popular abstract design of the era. He also developed a universe around José Carioca, a very popular character in Brazil. Abril increased production in the 1970s and 1980s. Except for José Carioca, recurring characters included Daisy (turned feminist) and Fethry Duck. Among the most prolific authors were the writer Arthur Faria Jr. and the artist Irineu Soares Rodriguez. Brazil is also known to have retained many "obscure" characters, largely forgotten elsewhere, besides Portugal. "O Pato Donald" (The Donald Duck) was initially published in comic book format, then from issue #22 began to be published in digest-sized format.

At the end of the 1990s, the Brazilian production ceased, and then restarted for a short while in the 2000s. After an absence of almost 10 years, with just a few special events stories, production again started up at the end of 2012. During the 2010s Abril was also responsible for publishing Disney's manga in Brazil (some unpublished in other countries outside Japan), including titles like Kingdom Hearts, Big Hero 6, Kilala Princess, Stitch!, Miriya and Marie, Star Wars and others.

Disney comics were published by Editora Abril since 1950, but the company stopped publishing them in 2018, facing financial difficulties. The next year, however, the comics returned through the publisher Culturama. José Carioca's title was not continued by Culturama, but new stories returned in September, 2020, in the comic book Aventuras Disney.

The best-known titles include:

- Pato Donald (1950–2018; 2019–present); 1st series, 2481 issues
- Mickey (1952–2018; 2019–present); 1st series, 911 issues
- Zé Carioca (1961–2018); 1st series, 2446 issues
- Tio Patinhas (Uncle Scrooge) (1963–2018; 2019–present); 1st series, 637 issues
- Pateta (Goofy) (1982–1984; 2004–2007; 2011–2018; 2019–2022); 1st series, 56 issues; 2nd, 26 issues; 3rd, 87 issues; 4th, 37 issues
- Peninha (Fethry Duck) (1982–1984; 2004–2007); 1st series, 56 issues; 2nd, 19 issues
- Margarida (Daisy Duck) (1986–1997; 2004–7); 1st series, 257 issues; 2nd, 25 issues
- Urtigão (Hard Haid Moe) (1987–1994; 2006); 1st series, 169 issues; 2nd, 6 issues
- Minnie (2004–2006; 2011–2018); 1st series, 29 issues; 2nd, 81 issues
- Aventuras Disney (2005–2009; 2019–present); 1st series, 48 issues

=== Argentina ===
Luis Destuet was an early artist in the 1940s (Some stories were reprinted in Brazil and Italy). Around the turn of the decade, Destuet moved to Brazil and started production there by training new artists. In the 1980s, Daniel Branca set up a prolific and influential story art production studio, influenced by Daan Jippes to create expressive artwork in Carl Barks' 1950s style.

=== Chile ===
The pre-war "Álbum Mickey" series contained various short strips that were possibly locally produced, according to Inducks, as well as some Zorro stories in the 1970s. Vicar set up a prolific Carl Barks–style story art production studio in the 1970s.

== Australia, Africa and Asia ==
=== Australia ===
The main Australian publisher was W.G. Publications (Wogan Publications from 1974). A number of series reflecting equivalents in the U.S. included Mickey Mouse and Donald Duck. The most significant series, however, are Walt Disney Comics (1946–1978); and the "Giant" (1951 to 1978).

Walt Disney Comics mixed and matched covers and stories from its sister U.S. publication, rather than just reprinting them. The "Giant" presented selections from various U.S. series, from film promotions such as Robin Hood to Uncle Scrooge, Beagle Boys and Junior Woodchucks. In some cases these were mere reprints. In others, an extra story was added to increase the page count; for instance, W MM 97-04 "Par for the Course", in No. 570 The Beagle Boys.

This practice of adding an extra story to an issue otherwise identical the U.S. one is common elsewhere; as an example, in the "Film Preview Series", the first Robin Hood issue has W OS 1055-03 "The Double Date" added.

=== Egypt ===
Mickey Mouse was introduced to the Arab world through a comic book called Samir, which published Samir Presents Mickey #1 in April 1958. This series published 24 issues in 1958 and 1959. Mickey proved very popular in Egypt, and in 1959 he got a weekly comic book, ميكي (Mickey). After 44 years of publication, the publisher Dar-Al-Hilal stopped publication in 2003, after disputes with Disney (The last issue being #2188, published in March, 2003).

In 2004, publisher Nahdat Masr acquired the Disney license, and the first issues were sold out in less than 8 hours. The new version of Mickey published issue #0 in December, 2003, and issue #1 in December 2004. As of 2018, the magazine had reached more than 700 issues. Besides the publication of the weekly magazine, two monthly magazines are published: مجلد سوبر ميكى (SuperMickey) and Mickey Geib "Pocket Mickey" (a pocket sized magazine).

In the 60s and 70s, original material was created (in Egyptian Arabic), most notably by Ahmed Hijazi, a folk-style artist.

=== Japan ===
Many Disney comics originally by American or European authors have been entirely re-drawn by Japanese artists for local publication. The Italian manga-inspired series, W.I.T.C.H., was submitted to the same kind of treatment, giving birth to a Japanese-exclusive adaptation with art by Haruko Iida and published by Kadokawa Shoten.

Japan also produced completely original Disney material, such as the manga adaptation of the videogame Kingdom Hearts by Shiro Amano, published by Bros Comics EX (and later translated in English by Tokyopop) and Jun Asaga's adaptation of Tim Burton's The Nightmare Before Christmas (originally published by Kodansha, English version by Disney Press).

=== Vietnam ===
Donald và bạn hữu (Vietnamese for "Donald and friends") is a bilingual weekly Disney comics magazine in Vietnamese and English published by Tre Publishing House in co-operation with The Saigon Times under license from the Walt Disney Company since 1998.

=== India ===
On December 8, 2010, DPW's India unit signed a multi-year contract with India Today Group to print and distribute Disney comics in India.

== Cataloguing ==
=== Story codes ===
Starting in the 1970s, as production of new Disney comics stories moved from a mostly-American, centralized publishing model to a group of international publishers sharing work, it became a practice to give each Disney comics story a unique letter-number code that would help identify a single story across languages. (Disney requires all licensees to facilitating international reprinting by providing the reproducible materials at cost.) The code is usually printed at the bottom of the story's first panel, and it consists of one or more letters, representing the publisher or country of origin, followed by a multi-digit number. In some cases, the code ends with another letter.

The main publishers are:

Story code prefix	Producer
AR	Another Rainbow (United States)
B	Abril (Brazil)
D	Egmont (Denmark)
E	Disney Europe (France)
F	Disney-Hachette (France)
G	Ehapa (Germany)
H	Oberon (Holland)
I	Mondadori, Disney Italy, Panini Comics (Italy)
K	Disney Comics (United States)
M	Marvel Comics (United States)
S	Disney Studios (United States, for European market)
W	Western Publishing (United States)

=== Fan databases ===
Multiple fan databases exist. Notable examples are I.N.D.U.C.K.S. and Don Markstein's Toonopedia.

== Notable artists and writers ==
Argentina

- Daniel Branca (1951–2005) influential Barks-style artist and studio director
- Jaime Diaz (1937–2009) studio director
- Wanda Gattino (b.1969)

Belgium

- Ténas (1926–2012) cover artist

Brazil

- Renato Canini (1936–2013) José Carioca artist
- José Carlos (1884–1950) created José Carioca
- Verci de Mello (b.1958) Hard Haid Moe artist
- Irineu Soares Rodrigues (b.1956) artist; worked w/ writers Arthur Faria Jr., Ivan Saidenberg, and Gérson Teixeira (bro: Moacir)
- Carlos Mota (b.1969) Barks-style artist

Chile

- Vicar (1934–2012) Barks-style artist/studio director; created Princess Oona w/ writer Stefan Printz-Påhlson

Denmark

- Flemming Andersen (b.1968) multi-style artist
- Freddy Milton (b.1948) Barks-style artist/writer; also made Barks-style stories w/ Woody Woodpecker and his own characters, Gnuff

Egypt

- Ahmed Hijazi (1936–2011) folk-style artist

Finland

- Tuomas Holopainen (b.1976) songwriter; wrote and produced the Gold album Music Inspired by the Life and Times of Scrooge
- Kari Korhonen (b.1973) mostly a Barks-style artist
- Markku Kivekäs (1947–2008) influential Barks translator/restorer/essayist/editor

France

- Bernard Cosey (b.1950) Gottfredson-style artist/writer (b.Switzerland)
- Pierre Nicolas (1921–1990) Gottfredson-style artist and studio director
- Régis Loisel (b.1951) Gottfredson-style artist/writer
- Claude Marin (1931–2001) editorial artist; also drew many Disney Babies comic pages w/ Gen-Clo (b.Algiers) and Bélom, as well as other stories
- Thierry Martin (born 1966) Gottfredson-style artist (b.Lebanon)

Germany

- Erika Fuchs (1906–2005) Barks translator
- Jan Gulbransson (b.1949) Barks-style artist/writer
- Adolf Kabatek (1931–1997) produced a series of Barks-style Scrooge McDuck graphic novels, Tales From Uncle Scrooge's Treasure Chest (b.Czech)
- Volker Reiche (b.1944) Barks-style artist/writer
- Ulrich Schröder (b.1964) artist and studio director

Italy

- Giovan Battista Carpi (1927–1999) multi-style artist; created Paperinik w/ writer Guido Martina
- Luciano Bottaro (1931–2006) multi-style artist
- Casty (b.1967) Scarpa-style artist/writer (early scripts drawn by others); created Eurasia Toft and Charlie Doublejoke
- Giorgio Cavazzano (b.1947) artist; developed an abstract style widely adopted in Italy; worked w/ writer Rodolfo Cimino; (cous: Luciano Capitanio)
- Carlo Chendi (1933–2021) writer
- Giulio Chierchini (1928–2019) multi-style artist
- Pier Lorenzo De Vita (1909–1990) Scarpa-style artist (son: Massimo)
- Enrico Faccini (b.1962) multi-style artist/writer
- Luciano Gatto (b.1934) multi-style artist
- Marco Gervasio (b.1967) Fantomius artist/writer
- Elisabetta Gnone (b.1965) writer/editorial director; created Disney Italia's W.I.T.C.H. comics
- Corrado Mastantuono (b.1962) Cavazzano-style artist/writer; created Boomer Buff
- Federico Pedrocchi (1907–1945) Gottfredson-style early artist/writer (b.Argentina)
- Giuseppe Perego (1915–1996) multi-style artist; worked w/ writer Gian Giacomo Dalmasso
- Giorgio Pezzin (b.1949) saga writer
- Marco Rota (b.1942) Barks-style artist; created Andold "Wild Duck" Temerary w/ editor Gaudenzio Capelli
- Bruno Sarda (b.1954) saga writer
- Guido Scala (1936–2001) Scarpa-style artist
- Romano Scarpa (1927–2005) influential Gottfredson-style/Barks-influenced artist; created Brigitta MacBridge, Dickie Duck, Gideon McDuck, Kildare Coot, Ellroy, Trudy Van Tubb and Portis
- Silvia Ziche (b.1967) soap opera artist/writer

Japan

- Shiro Amano (b.1976) artist/writer; adapted Kingdom Hearts video games into manga
- Shiro Shirai (b.1971) Barks-style artist/writer

Netherlands

- Sander Gulien (b.1974) Barks-style artist
- Mau Heymans (b.1961) Barks-style artist (bro: Bas)
- Daan Jippes (b.1945) influential Barks-style artist/writer and studio director; popularized the replication of Barks's art style for Disney comics; redrew stories Barks only wrote and several of his unfinished scripts
- Frank Jonker (b.1965) writer
- Wilma Van Den Bosch (b.1956) Daisy Duck artist; editorial/cover artist (b.Canada)
- Ben Verhagen (b.1949) Barks-style artist

Norway

- Arild Midthun (b.1964) – Barks-style artist

Spain

- Gil Bao (1915–?) multi-style artist
- Miquel Pujol (b.1951) multi-style artist
- Paco Rodriguez (b.1967) Barks-style artist

Sweden

- Tony Cronstam (b.1969) Barks-style artist

United Kingdom

- Paul Halas (b.1949) writer
- William Ward (1887–1958) early artist/writer; created the 1st Donald Duck comic book story

United States

- Pete Alvarado (1920–2003) artist; drew stories based on Disney animated films
- Carl Barks (1901–2000) foundational Disney comics artist/writer; lead screenwriter/storyboard artist for the early Donald Duck cartoons; developed Donald Duck and created Daisy Duck, Huey, Dewey and Louie, Scrooge McDuck and the supporting cast of Duckburg, including April, May and June, Gyro Gearloose, the Junior Woodchucks, Gladstone Gander, the Beagle Boys, Magica De Spell, Flintheart Glomgold, Glittering Goldie, John D. Rockerduck, Neighbor Jones, Gus Goose, Clinton Coot, the McDuck Money Bin and the character arcs and story arcs of the duck 'universe'
- Garé Barks (1917–1993) landscape artist who lettered and inked backgrounds and solids in Barks's stories; wife of Carl Barks
- Jack Bradbury (1914–2004) artist
- Carl Buettner (1905–1965) art director; created Li'l Bad Wolf w/ Dorothy Strebe (see also, Gil Turner)
- Pinto Colvig (1892–1967) actor/artist; created Goofy
- Phil DeLara (1914–1973) most prolific Chip 'n' Dale artist
- Walt Disney (1901–1966) film producer; 1st writer for the Mickey Mouse comic strip; created Sylvester Shyster w/ artist Floyd Gottfredson; co-created some of the original Mickey Mouse cast w/ animator Ub Iwerks
- Norm Ferguson (1902–1957) lead animator; developed Pluto, Peg-Leg Pete and the Big Bad Wolf
- Manuel Gonzales (1913–1993) Gottfredson studio artist (b.Spain); created Ellsworth for the Mickey Mouse Sunday pages w/ writer Bill Walsh
- Floyd Gottfredson (1905–1986) foundational artist/writer and studio director; most known for drawing and plotting the Mickey Mouse comic strip and establishing the art style and high standards of the Disney newspaper comics; created Morty and Ferdie Fieldmouse; also, Doctor Einmug, Captain Doberman, Gloomy the mechanic and Eli Squinch w/ co-writer Ted Osborne; and Chief O'Hara, Detective Casey & The Phantom Blot w/ co-writer Merrill De Maris
- Bob Gregory (1921–2003) artist/writer; wrote over a dozen stories that were re-scripted/drawn by Barks
- Jack Hannah (1913–1994) animation director; co-artist of Carl Barks' 1st comic art (Donald Duck Finds Pirate Gold); directed Donald Duck films written by Barks
- Al Hubbard (1913–1984) artist; created Fethry Duck, Hard Haid Moe and 0.0. Duck w/ writer Dick Kinney; created Belle Duck w/ writer (?); created The Sleuth w/ writer Carl Fallberg
- Albert Hurter (1888–1941) designer (b.Switzerland); created Donald Duck w/ voice actor Clarence Nash
- Ub Iwerks (1901–1971) lead animator; created Mickey Mouse, Minnie Mouse, Horace Horsecollar and Clarabelle Cow w/ producer Walt Disney; 1st artist for Disney comics and the Mickey Mouse comic strip w/ artist Win Smith (b.Canada)
- Walt Kelly (1913–1973) cover artist
- Dick Moores (1909–1986) Mickey Mouse artist/writer; Brer Rabbit artist; created Scamp w/ Ward Greene
- Paul Murry (1911–1989) artist for Mickey Mouse stories w/ writer Carl Fallberg; created Super Goof w/ writer/editorial director Del Connell
- Floyd Norman (b.1935) writer; re-introduced serialized adventures to the Mickey Mouse dailies (early 1990s)
- Don Rosa (b.1951) popular artist/writer and Scrooge McDuck chronologist; wrote and drew the award-winning series, The Life and Times of Scrooge McDuck; created sequels to Barks's classic stories
- Dan Spiegel (1920–2017) drew Disney comics based on live-action series and films, incl. realist settings for Mickey Mouse stories w/ Paul Murry
- Tony Strobl (1915–1991) artist; created Moby Duck w/ writer Vic Lockman
- Al Taliaferro (1905–1969) Gottfredson-style artist for the Donald Duck comic strip; created Grandma Duck w/ writer Bob Karp; proposed idea for the film Donald's Nephews, leading to the creation of Huey, Dewey and Louie; 1st to draw Donald Duck in the comics; created Bucky Bug w/ artist/writer Earl Duvall
- Alex Toth (1928–2006) Zorro artist
- William Van Horn (b.1939) Barks-style artist/writer; influenced by George Herriman (son: Noel)
- Bill Walsh (1913–1975) writer for the Mickey Mouse comic strip in the 1940s; created Eega Beeva and the Rhyming Man w/ artist Floyd Gottfredson
- Bill Wright (1917–1984) Gottfredson studio artist; Gottfredson-style comic book artist
- David Gerstein (b.1974) writer for Egmont; editor/translator
- Dick Kinney (1916–1985) writer of Studio stories
- John Lustig (b.1953) writer for Egmont; completed unfinished scripts by Carl Barks
- Pat McGreal (1953–2021) writer for Egmont w/ wife Carol
- Jerry Siegel (1914–1996) writer for Mondadori

Yugoslavia

- Vlastimir Belkić (1896–1946) Gottfredson-style artist

== See also ==
- List of Disney comics by Carl Barks
- List of Disney comics by Don Rosa
- How to Read Donald Duck – a 1971 critique of Disney comics as capitalist propaganda
- Flipism – Practice or personal philosophy in which all decisions are made by flipping a coin
