= Giulio Chierchini =

Italian comic book writer and illustrator (1928–2019)

Giulio Ernesto Chierchini (22 May 1928 – 18 August 2019) was an Italian comics writer and artist, mainly known for his Disney comics work. He was the oldest still active Disney creator shortly before his death.

== Disney comics ==
His work for Disney Italia started in 1953 when he was inking for Giovan Battista Carpi, who was also his most important artistic influence. The first stories he had drawn entirely himself were published in Topolino 1956.

As an author, he debuted in 1964 but didn't start writing regularly until the mid-1970s. Most of his self-penned stories were released in the 1980s, when he was also dabbling with unusual formats: From 1986 to 1995, he wrote and drew several comics which consisted of mostly four "painted panels" per page. These panels were created with a technique that involved airbrush, oil paint and / or watercolour, and subsequently used as the background for "normal" drawings of the main comic figures. For three of these stories, he also created cover illustrations in that style, as featured on Topolino 1707, 1741 and 1891. A few other artists such as Sergio Asteriti, Roberto Marini, Marco Ghighlione, Luciano Gatto and Moreno Chisté (who was also involved with the colouring of some Chierchini comics) also experimented with this two-rows-per-page format in this period. According to Chierchini, these painted panels were well-received by the readers, but weren't to the liking of the Italian editors.

In this period, Chierchini wrote, painted and drew a lot of stories that featured his creation Little Gum, an alien humanoid duck that eats chewing gum and can use it for various purposes, alongside Donald Duck, Scrooge McDuck, Huey, Dewey and Louie. In his first story, Little Gum was introduced as an enemy of Duck Avenger but became an ally of his when the Beagle Boys tried to rob the Money Bin.

In 1994, two Disney comics (co-)written but not drawn by Giulio Chierchini (this was done by Moreno Chisté instead) were released. They turned out to be some of his last published works as a Disney author, as Topolino has not published any stories written by him after 1995. He is nonetheless still working for Topolino as an artist only.

While Chierchini was clearly influenced by Carpi, he quickly developed his own signature style. The typical facial expressions (with Scrooge and the Beagle Boys in particular often being displayed as rather aggressive) and Chierchini's penchant for gothic architecture make his art unmistakable. "Gothic" themes also regularly appear in his stories, such as "Topolino e Little Gum fantasmi a bizzeffe", "Topolino e le vendite a domicilio" (Mickey helping a ghost sales agent who sells things to other ghosts), "Zio Paperone i fantasmi B. B." (Beagle Boys as fake ghosts) and "Topolino & Pippo ghostbusters (cacciatori di fantasmi)" which obviously parodies Ghostbusters, but also marks the re-appearance of the Ghost of Black Brian from the Floyd Gottfredson continuity. Another character revived partially by Chierchini is Doctor Vulter in "Topolino e il ritorno dell'artiglio magnetico", written by Guido Martina.

== Other work ==
Before he started working for Disney, Chierchini had tried his hand at animation and turned his hand to drawing for various Italian titles ("Volpetto", "Mao & Okey", "Castorino", "Tik Corvo", "Dan Lepre") and created the character/series "Nonna Abelarda". Later in his career, he also worked for the German publisher Kauka.

Together with collaborators Valerio Oss, Moreno Chistè and Sandra Verda, he created a five-hour instructory video for aspiring comic creators.
