= Inducks =

World-wide database about Disney comics

I.N.D.U.C.K.S.
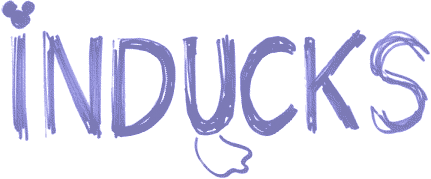
- Website type: Comics database
- Available in: Danish, Dutch, English, Finnish, French, German, Greek, Italian, Norwegian, Polish, Portuguese, Russian, Spanish and Swedish
- Owner: Collective
- Creator: Harry Fluks
- Website: Inducks.org
- Commercial: No
- Registration: Non mandatory
- Launched: 1994

The International Network of Disney Universe Comic Knowers and Sources (I.N.D.U.C.K.S.) or Inducks is a freely available database aiming to index all Disney comics ever printed in the world, created and maintained by both amateurs and professionals. It is an international project which provides indexes of around 170,000 Disney comic publications worldwide. It is distributed with its own license.

== Origin ==
Efforts to catalog Disney comic stories on a large scale date from the late 1970s and early 1980s. Among the most important works are an index of Disney comics published in Denmark, a list of stories produced in Italy, a list of American daily strips and Sunday pages, an index of American Dell Disney comics and a Carl Barks index. All these lists include artists and writer credits that were previously unknown.

In August 1992, Per Starbäck (from Sweden) created the Disney Comics Mailing List. Members soon contributed lists of Disney comics and gave references for printed indexes. In May 1994, expanding on information exchanged on the mailing list, Harry Fluks (from the Netherlands) created a database to organize comic indexes, and called it the Disney Comics Database.

In 1999, a German member suggested the name Inducks as a cross between "index" and "duck" (for Donald Duck). It was playfully written I.N.D.U.C.K.S. to resemble acronyms seen in Junior Woodchucks comics. Several meanings have been proposed, including "Internet Database for Uncle Walt's Comics and Stories", "International Network for Disney Universal Comic Knowledge and Sources", up to 2008 when International Network of Disney-Universe Comic Knowers and Sources was selected.

Over the years, a web search interface was introduced, later replaced by a second search engine, COA, in 2001.

== Data details ==
The Inducks database lists publications, stories, characters and creators which are cross-referenced. Each story is given a unique "storycode" so that reprints (often from all over the world) may be found for any story. A large number of Disney comics publications are indexed for the following countries: Australia, Brazil, Denmark, Italy, Finland, France, Germany, Greece, the Netherlands, Norway, Poland, Spain, Sweden and United States. Among countries with a significant Disney comics tradition, indexes for Mexico, United Kingdom and (ex-) Yugoslavia are still incomplete.

Inducks integrates previous studies and research works, with permission of the authors, as well as its own research. Thanks to contacts with creators, it provides credits to anonymous (or wrongly-credited) stories. In particular, most Disney comics were not given credits until the 1980s or 1990s. It also contains information about unpublished Disney comics stories.

The main interface to Inducks is a search engine, browser and website abbreviated COA, which is daily updated based on Inducks data, and is available in thirteen languages. While COA uses Inducks data, it is not part of Inducks itself, but it enables users to navigate and search data which in its raw form consists of very user-unfriendly text files. It has a few other features not part of Inducks, like a collection management system and an error tracker tool.

== Use as a source and in publications ==
Although parts of the database have been published in book form and in specialized journals, Inducks is most often used as a source by comic book historians in articles devoted to Disney comics.

Inducks is also used by Disney editors around the world. It is mentioned as a source by scholars and is referenced in books about comics in general. It has once been criticized for being a catalog of data rather than true (semantic) indexing work.

Inducks sometimes gave talks and held meetings in comic-book fairs in Italy, such as in Lucca in 1997 with Don Rosa and Marco Rota and in Reggio Emilia in 2007 and 2008. In 2004, it won an Internet award from afNews, an association of professional cartoonists in Italy.

== See also ==
- Disney comics
- Donald Duck universe
- Donald Duck in comics
- Donaldism
