= Tony Cronstam =

Swedish cartoonist (born 1969)

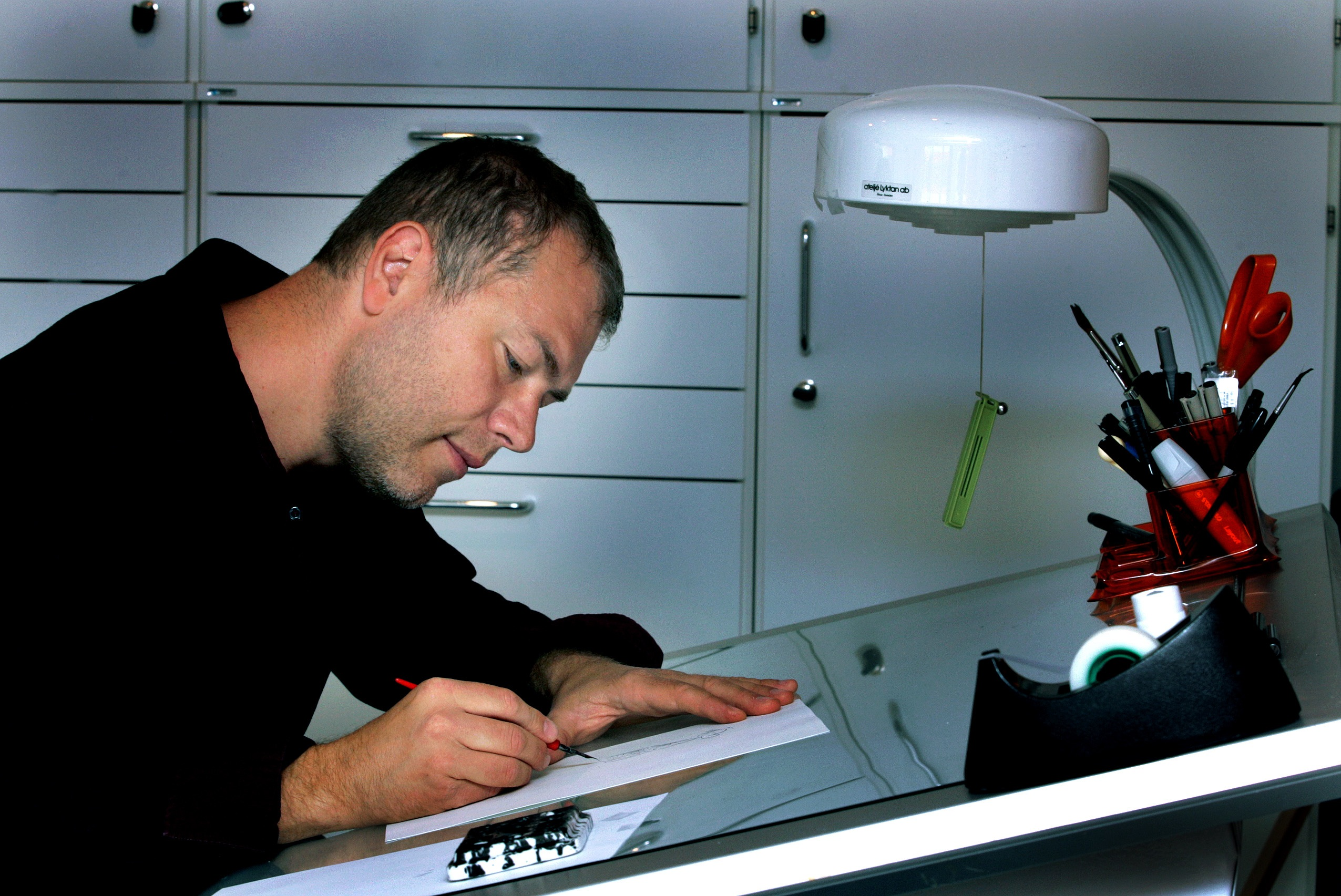
Tony Cronstam in 2013.

Tony Cronstam (born 6 August 1969, Växjö) is a Swedish cartoonist.

An illustrator of role-playing games for Target Games during the 1980s, he made his debut as a cartoonist with the future-based strip Provet (The Test) in Svenska Serier (no. 3/90). In 1990, he began drawing Bamse, and was the principal Bamse artist between 1998 and 2001. He taught at comic school from 1999 to 2004.

Together with Maria Cronstam, he created the comic strip Elvis, in 2000, for publication in Metro Stockholm. Elvis won the prestigious Adamson Award in 2004.

Since 2018, Cronstam has drawn Disney comics for the Egmont publishing house.

== Bibliography ==
- Elvis (2000)
- Elvis – under skalet (2003)
- Elvis – bäst i test (2004)
- Elvis – toastad men inte bränd (2005)
- Elvis – första boken extra allt (2006)
