= Flemming Andersen =

Danish Disney comics artist

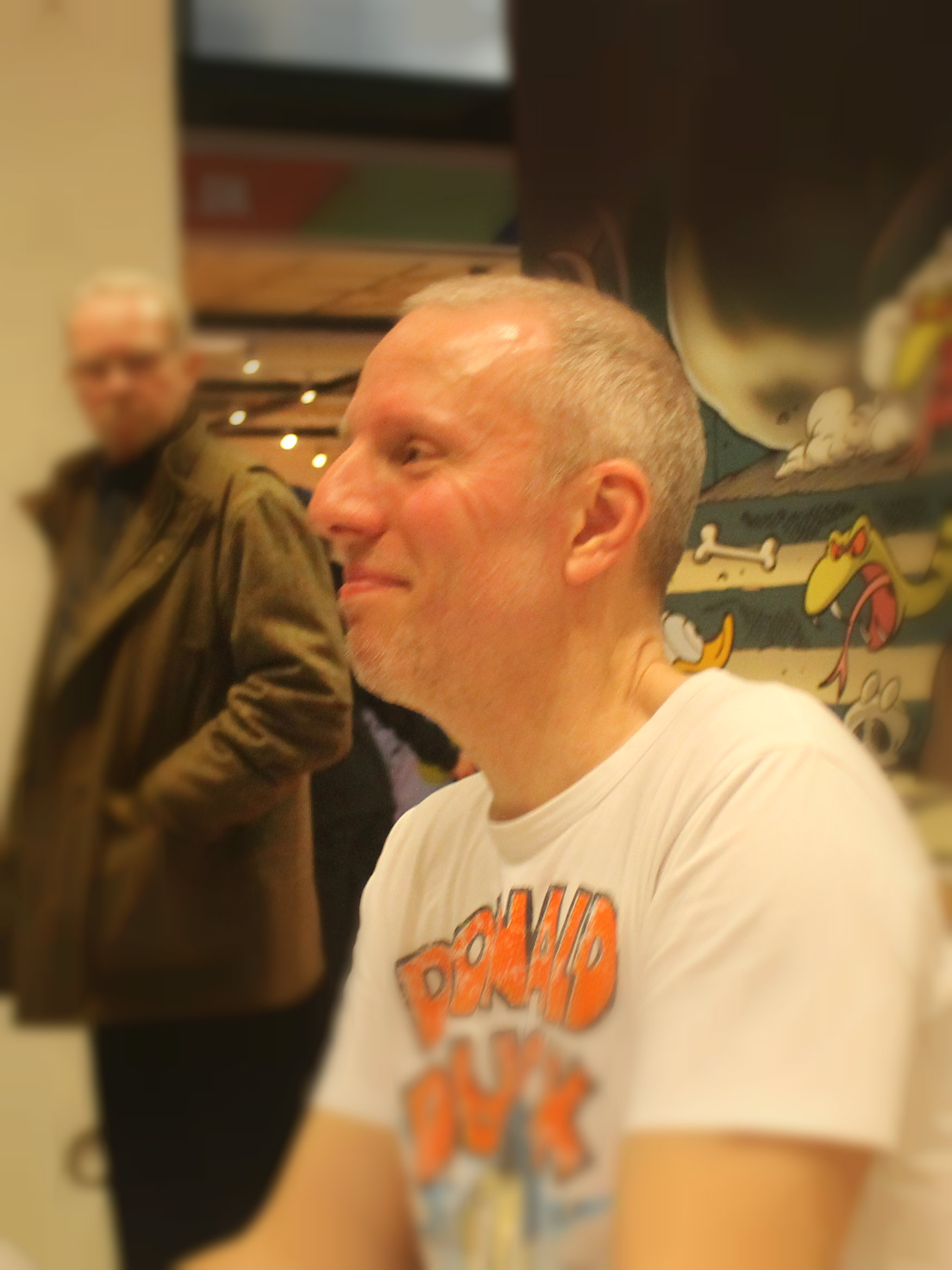
- Born: 2 June 1968 (age 58) Copenhagen, Denmark
- Area: Cartoonist

Flemming Andersen (born 2 June 1968) is a Danish comics artist best known for Disney comics starring Donald Duck and related characters. He is also doing his own comic strip A Seagull's Life.

== Biography ==
Andersen was born in Copenhagen. In his childhood, he enjoyed Scandinavian comics, such as works by the Danish cartoonist Storm P., and Franco-Belgian comics. As a student, it was clear for Andersen to become a professional artist. After finishing school and military service, he searched for a job as an illustrator, preferably at advertising agencies and newspapers. Andersen learned that the media group Egmont, the Danish publisher for Disney comics, searched for artists. After he sent his illustrations, he was hired by Egmont in 1991, but not as an advertising illustrator. At first, Andersen wrote the stories for Disney comics, but in 1992, he started drawing the comics himself.

Andersen developed a flashy and action-packed style. His source of inspiration are Disney comics artists such as Carl Barks, Giorgio Cavazzano, Massimo De Vita, and Daniel Branca. Most of his comics feature Donald Duck and other characters in the Duck universe, including Huey, Dewey, and Louie and Scrooge McDuck. Mickey Mouse made a small appearance in the 1994 comic The Tinderbox. Storylines consisting of multiple comics drawn by Andersen include Tamers of Nonhuman Threats and Formula 1. Andersen's works are frequently published in various European Disney comic books, especially in Scandinavian countries and Germany.

Since 1999, Flemming Andersen also illustrates children's books.
