= Picsou Magazine =

French Disney comics magazine

Picsou Magazine (French: Picsou magazine, pronounced [piksu]) is a French magazine featuring characters from the Scrooge McDuck universe, as Balthazar Picsou ("coin pincher") is the French name of Scrooge McDuck. The magazine was started in March 1972. It was published on a monthly basis by Disney Hachette Presse, which has a license from the Walt Disney Company for producing and distributing Disney comics in France. In 2020, Unique Heritage Media bought Disney Hachette Presse.

== See also ==
- Uncle Scrooge
