= Vicar (cartoonist) =

Chilean Disney comics artist

Victor Arriagada Ríos
- Drawing of Vicar by cartoonist Diego Jourdan.
- Born: Victor José Arriagada Ríos; April 16, 1934 Santiago, Chile
- Died: January 3, 2012 (aged 77) Santiago, Chile
- Area: Cartoonist
- Pseudonym: Vicar
- Notable works: Locutín; Hipólito y Camilo; Quevedo; Paquita; Huaso Ramón

Vicar, a pseudonym for Víctor José Arriagada Ríos (April 16, 1934 – January 3, 2012), was a Chilean cartoonist, known for his prolific career drawing Disney comics.

== Biography ==
While studying art and theatre, Vicar started his illustrating career with political caricature drawings. Vicar moved to Spain in 1960, doing various illustrating works, and entered the comics field in 1966. Five years later, he started to draw Disney comics for the Danish publisher Gutenberghus (now the Egmont Group). He moved back to Chile in 1975. Vicar's position in the Disney comic field grew with the years, and soon he had a studio, with several artists and inkers working for him. He wrote only two of his stories himself, The Winter Contest from 1986 and A Lucky Duck from 1997. Vicar and his crew produced up to 200 pages a year.

After a long battle with leukemia, Vicar died on January 3, 2012.
