= Metro (Swedish newspaper) =

Swedish free newspaper

- Metro's international logo
- Type: Daily newspaper
- Format: Broadsheet
- Publisher: Metro International
- Founded: 14 February 1995
- Ceased publication: August 2019
- Political alignment: Independent
- Language: Swedish
- Headquarters: Stockholm

Metro was a free daily newspaper in Sweden. It was printed in four editions: Stockholm, Gothenburg, Skåne and National, which were distributed in 67 towns and cities throughout the country. The paper was the first European free paper. On 8 August 2019, its cancellation was announced.

== History and profile ==
Metro Stockholm was the first version. The paper was launched on 13 February 1995 and distributed in the Stockholm Metro. Its owner and founding company is Modern Times Group (MTG), a subsidiary of the Swedish conglomerate Kinnevik. The paper is published in tabloid format by Metro International.

For a long time, Metro was the sole free newspaper available in the different metropolitan areas. In 2002, the Bonnier Group launched Stockholm City in the Stockholm region. City expanded into Gothenburg and Malmö in September 2006 and was followed a few weeks later by the Schibsted-backed Punkt SE in all three cities. City Göteborg was closed down in late 2007. In May 2008, Metro had reached an agreement with Schibsted that meant that Punkt SE would be closed down and Schibsted would buy a 35 percent share of Metro Sweden.

In the period of 2001–2002, Metro sold 384,000 copies. Hard hit by the introduction of smart phones, which led morning commuters and other key groups of readers to follow news on cell phones instead of picking up free newspapers, the paper's finances grew increasingly strained in the 2000s. Unable to pay its bills, the newspaper ceased publication in 2019 after briefly attempting to survive as an online-only publication.

== Comics ==
Both the long-featured comic strip Elvis, by Tony Cronstam, and the earlier Rocky, by Martin Kellerman, were first published in Metro Stockholm.

Elvis: Elvis Tonysson, the main character of the comic, is a middle-aged man portrayed as a tortoise, according to Cronstam loosely based on himself, and like most of the recurring characters based on friends and family. The main plot of the strip is according to Cronstam based on day-to-day annoyances encountered in real life. The plot of the strips published in the daily newspaper usually don't stretch over multiple strips, making the strip easy to understand even for non-daily readers, which is the case with most daily newspaper strips. There are also several comic books released, some of which feature a main plot. Tony's wife Maria Cronstam became a main part in the development of the comic, as the strip more and more got based on their life together with their daughter. After the relationship broke up, the strip itself was cancelled.
