= Claude Marin =

French cartoonist

Claude Marin (1931–2001) was a French cartoonist who drew Disney comics from 1978 to 1997, working for Le Journal de Mickey. Early in his Disney comics career, he mainly drew stories featuring Mickey Mouse and Goofy. In 1986, he created the popular "Disney Babies" strip for Le Journal de Mickey, which ran weekly until April 30, 1997.
