= Donaldism =

Disney comics fandom

Donaldism is the fandom associated with Disney comics and cartoons. The name refers to Donald Duck and was first used by author Jon Gisle in his essay "Donaldismen" from 1971 and expanded in his book Donaldismen in 1973.

In some (especially European) countries, Donaldism is mainly centred on comics and comic strips, while in other countries, e.g. the U.S. and Japan, these are largely neglected while motion pictures and shorts are relatively much more popular. Originally the term, as defined by Gisle, referred to a "Research branch as well as the material that is the object of this research. In the latter meaning, the word denotes every Disney signed comic story. In the former meaning, Donaldism is a branch of comics research, specialising in the study of precisely Disney's production." While this original meaning of the word was defined in 1973, today Donaldism tends to also cover general fandom within Disney comics and even motion pictures and shorts.

Although the term refers directly to the Donald Duck universe, it includes other Disney universes.

== Donaldists ==
A Donaldist is a supporter of Donaldism: a fan or researcher of Disney comics. According to the 1977 manifest of Norwegian Donaldist society "Donaldistene", "donaldists are Donald Duck fans who study Donald Duck & Co [Norwegian Disney comic book, editor] from social and political structures and viewpoints. Moreover, they try in the best possible way to preserve donaldistic cultural material for their own and others' collections."

Part of Donaldist culture is to create backronyms for names and titles; this usage stems from Carl Barks's Junior Woodchucks comics, where the scout leaders generally had long and pompous titles, leading to jocular acronyms.

The term Donaldist has been used in authorized Disney publications: the collector-themed Gemstone Publishing album series Walt Disney Treasures was advertised with the questioning slogan "Are You a Donaldist?"

== Donaldistic research ==
One of the first important discoveries was in 1960 when American fan John Spicer wrote the first fan letter to Carl Barks, to which Barks replied. Until then, Walt Disney was thought to have drawn and written all comics himself, although fans suspected otherwise. It was later discovered that Disney himself had only been involved in the production of a handful of comics.

In 1973 Jon Gisle published the Donald Duck analysis Donaldismen: En muntert-vitenskapelig studie over Donald Duck og hans verden.

Donaldistic research is still being performed, although generally at a lower frequency than in the 1970s and '80s. Research results today are typically presented in fanzines or in Internet websites.

=== Denmark ===
Although Gisle's book was translated into Danish with the title "Andeologien" ("The Donald / Duck -ology"), after Donald's Danish name "Anders And", currently the Norwegian/international term "Donaldism" is the most commonly used.

In Denmark, one of the main sources for Donaldistic research and other Donaldistic articles is Carl Barks & Co., with Freddy Milton as editor and main driving force. The first issue was published in 1974, and the fanzine continued until 2000 at a varied frequency; sometimes several issues per year, sometimes years passed without an issue. The fanzine presented much Donaldistic research, including a large index of Danish Disney comic books (which is now maintained by the Inducks project and the original authors). Despite its name, the fanzine contained material on various fields within Disney comics, but still with an emphasis on material about Carl Barks, the passing of whom unleashed the discontinuation of the fanzine.

In 2001 a Danish Donaldistic society (Danish: Dansk Donaldist-Forening) was formed by a group of Danish Donaldists and the following year the first issue of their fanzine DDF(R)appet was published. DDF(R)appet has a publication frequency of approximately two issues per year, and among its articles are a few research presentations.

Other notable (comics) fanzines which are not Donaldistic as such but still carry Donaldistic material from time to time are: Nørd-nyt, Rackham, Seriejournalen, and Strip!.

=== Finland ===
In Finnish Donaldism has the title ankismi (from Finnish ankka, "duck"). Prominent Donaldists in the country have included comic book writer Timo Ronkainen, founder of the fanzine Ankkalinnan pamaus, and Markku Kivekäs, the long-time (1988–2007) editor of Aku Ankka.

=== France ===
Picsou-Soir is a French fanzine created in 2019, published quarterly and available in two versions (digital and print).

=== Germany ===
D.O.N.A.L.D. (Deutsche Organisation nichtkommerzieller Anhänger des lauteren Donaldismus or the German Organization of Non-commercial Devotees of Pure Donaldism) is the Donaldistic society of Germany. Founded by Hans von Storch, it has presented many contributions to donaldistic research through its fanzine Der Donaldist. It also holds several meetings and one congress each year.

Donaldists have risen in rank and are actively infiltrating the culture pages of several important newspapers in Germany, such as the Frankfurter Allgemeine Zeitung, where they subtly install quotations easily recognisable to fans of the comics. The German study of Donaldism is decisively influenced by the German translations of Barks's comic books by Erika Fuchs.

They were also influential when the Museum for Comic and Language-Art, called Erika-Fuchs-Haus was opened in Schwarzenbach an der Saale, Fuchs' main living place, in 2015.

Bertel-Express is a German online fanzine created in 2006, currently published quarterly.

=== Norway ===
==== Donaldisten (The Donaldist) ====
In the homeland of donaldism, Norway, the fanzine Donaldisten (The Donaldist) has been published since 1973. The Donaldistic society Gammeldonaldismens Venner (Friends of the Early Donaldism), founded 1975, issued Donaldisten in the years 1975–1988. Focusing on Jon Gisle's definition of Donaldism, the issues contain many research results.

In 1995 publication of Donaldisten was continued by a new society, Donaldistene (The Donaldists), but after only one issue, a nine-year time span passed until another issue was published in 2004. The new society focuses less on research, mirroring a general change among Donaldists. Mid 2007, Donaldistene still have only published two issues of Donaldisten, though.

==== Other fanzines ====
March 2007 a new Norwegian fanzine about Donaldism entitled Kvakk! (Quack!) was announced, which will bring articles, interviews, and reviews. Behind the fanzine are the same persons who also maintain Norway's most popular website on Disney comics, Andeby Online (Duckburg Online). The first issue will be out in the summer of 2007, and after that there will be four issues released every year.

- Carl Barks and The Old Master's Secret (1976, one issue)
- Duckmite (1979, one issue)
- Duckburg (1981–82, four issues)

==== University research ====
Tore Ismanto Hofstad wrote about the role of religion in Donald Duck comics in his thesis for his master's degree at the Department of Philosophy and Religious Studies at the Norwegian University of Science and Technology.

=== Sweden ===
Sweden has a long tradition of publishing Donaldistic research and other articles in their fanzine NAFS(K)URIREN since 1977. The fanzine is published once or twice a year by the Swedish Donaldistic society, NAFS(K) (Nationella Ankistförbundet i Sverige (kvack)) or The Swedish National Donaldism Society (quack)), founded on September 21, 1976. The local name for Donaldism is "ankism" (lit. "duckism"). Donald Duck's name in Sweden is "Kalle Anka" (loosely translated as "Charlie Duck").

=== U.S. ===
- The Barks Collector (1976– )
- The Comics Journal (1976– ) (general comics information)
- The Duckburg Times (1977– )
- The Barks Catalog
- Barksburg (1982)
- The Duck Hunter (1995–1996)

== See also ==
- Disney adults
- Disney comics
- Inducks (Disney comics database)
- Donald Duck in comics
- Donald Duck universe
- Flipism
