= Miky Maous =

Miky Maous (Greek: Μίκυ Μάους) is a Greek weekly comic that was first published on 1 July 1966, by Christos Terzopoulos. In 2006, the magazine surpassed 2000 issues and forty years of consecutive weekly print. It was the second oldest comic title in Greece until it ceased publication in 2013.

Miky Maous was published by Nea Aktina S.A., a subsidiary of Terzopoulos Publishing S.A. and Lambrakis Press Group since 1999. At the beginning of September 2013, Miky Maous ceased publications due to the ongoing crisis in Greece, that caused budget problems to Nea Aktina.

In 2014, the magazine was relaunched by Kathimerini, with numbering starting at #1.

In Greek culture, the phrase Miky Maous has become synonymous with comic books.
