= Kari Korhonen =

Finnish cartoonist (born 1973)

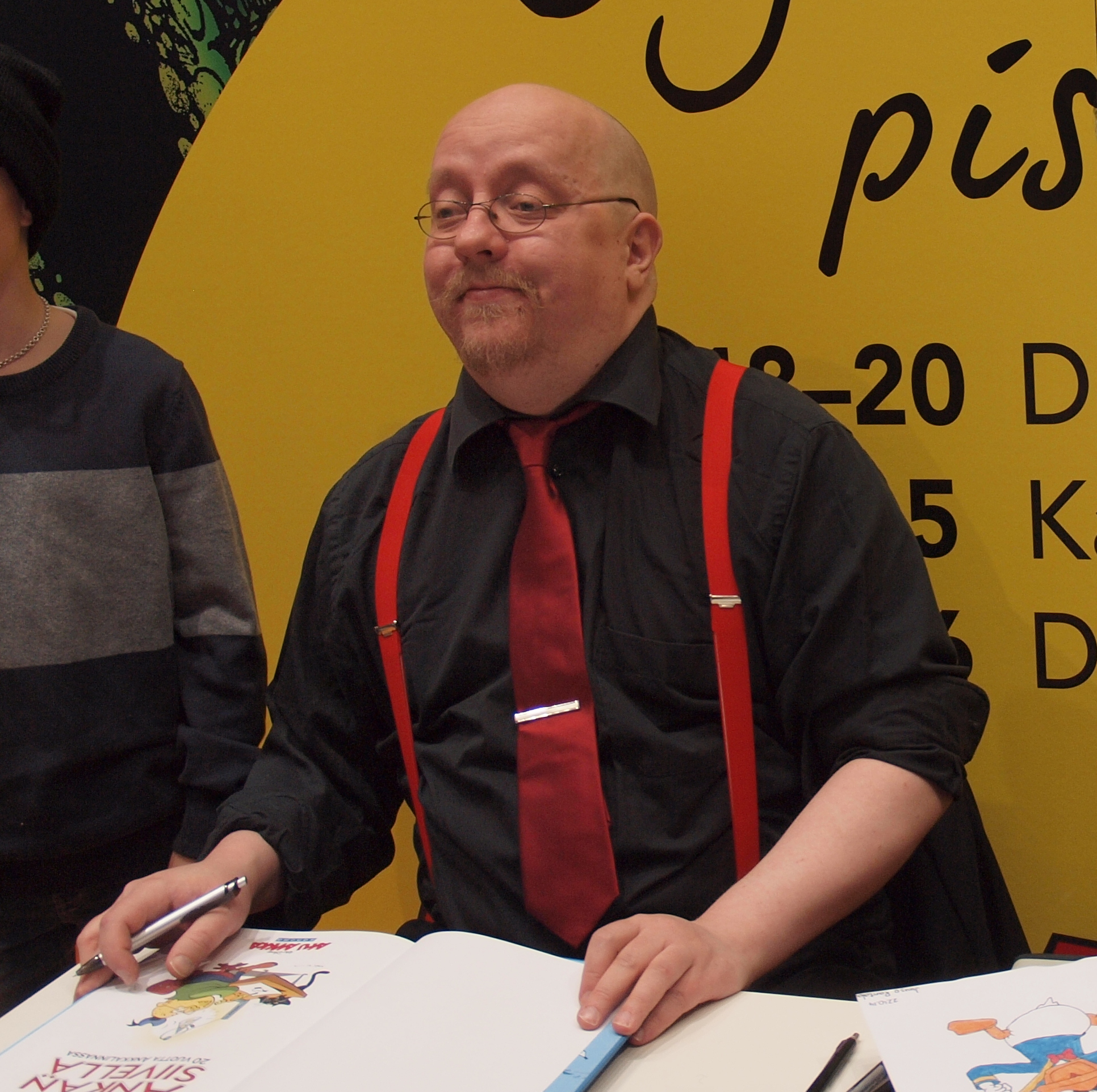
- Korhonen at the Helsinki Book Fair in 2014
- Born: 8 October 1973 (age 53) Espoo, Finland
- Notable works: Nummisuutarin Aku (based on Heath Cobblers by Aleksis Kivi)

Kari Korhonen (born 8 October 1973) is a Finnish cartoonist known for his stories about Donald Duck.

Korhonen has been drawing Disney comics for the Danish publisher Egmont Group since 1993, where he is most known for his work on Donald Duck stories and Winnie the Pooh. Apart from his work at Disney characters, he is also known as a commercial illustrator for magazines and children's books. In 2011, Korhonen wrote and drew the first Angry Birds comic.
