= Daniel Branca =

Argentine comic artist (1951–2005)

- Born: December 7, 1951 Buenos Aires, Argentina
- Died: January 28, 2005 (aged 53) Buenos Aires, Argentina
- Area: Artist

Daniel Branca (December 7, 1951 – January 28, 2005) was an Argentine comic artist known for his work on Disney comic books.

== Biography ==
Born in Buenos Aires, Branca got interested in comics and arts at an early age, and started his career working for a children's magazine at 14. At 16, Branca found employment as assistant animator for an advertising company. During the 1970s, he worked with Oscar Fernández, producing various comics for Argentine magazines: "El Sátiro Virgen", "El Mono Relojero". Branca's history as an animator shows clearly in his drawing style, which is elastic and energetic.

Branca and Fernández moved to Barcelona, Spain, in 1976. After their collaboration Caramelot, Branca began to illustrate Disney comics for the Danish publisher Egmont. He was one of the most acclaimed and productive Disney artist in the 1980s and early 1990s, one of his specialties was his portrayal of Donald Duck's dog, Bolivar. After moving first to Paris and then to Mallorca, Branca settled down in Buenos Aires again in 1995. During the 1990s, he did the comic Montana.

Daniel Branca died at 53 of a heart attack.
