= Micky Maus =

German magazine for Disney comics, launched in 1951

- Cover to issue #1

Publication information
- Publisher: Egmont Ehapa
- Schedule: Bi-weekly
- Genre: Humor; Adventure; Anthropomorphic animals
- Publication date: 1951–present
- No. of issues: 3169 (December 31, 2016)

Micky Maus (German: [ˈmɪkiˌmaʊs]) is a German comics magazine containing Disney comics. It has been published since 1951 by Egmont Ehapa.

== History ==
The magazine was originally published monthly, but supplemented with occasional special issues containing longer stories. As the audience grew, the special issues became more frequent. In 1956, the two comics combined to become biweekly. Longer stories, which were previously intended for the special issues, appeared since then as continuous stories published over several issues.

In 1957, with issue #26, the magazine began a weekly schedule.

In 1991, the series was a rare exception to the downwards trend of comic sales in the world. It reached the height of its popularity during the early 1990s, with more than 800,000 copies per issue sold on average in 1992. In 1998, the combined sales of Micky Maus passed a billion, making it one of the highest-selling comic series of all time. Since the late 1990s, sales figures have rapidly declined to 75,329 per issue (2016). After a long period as a weekly, the publication frequency of Micky Maus decreased to three times a month in 2016, and to twice a month in 2017.
