= Jon Gisle =

Norwegian jurist, encyclopedist and philologist

Jon Gisle (born 19 November 1948) is a Norwegian jurist, encyclopedist and philologist.

== Biography ==
He is cand.philol. (1974) and cand.jur. (1998) from the University of Oslo. He was publishing editor from 1977 to 1980 in Kunnskapsforlaget. Between 2003 and 2008, Gisle was judge in the Labour Court of Norway. Since 2008, he has had his own lawyer practice in Oslo in the lawyer fellowship Arbeidsrettsadvokatene.

Gisle is also famous for being a cartoon expert, and in 1973 he published the Donald Duck analysis Donaldismen: En muntert-vitenskapelig studie over Donald Duck og hans verden, in which he introduced the term "Donaldism."

In 1986, Gisle founded with others the cartoon periodical TEGN, in which he was editor-in-chief the first years.

== See also ==
- Donaldism
