= Marco Rota =

Italian Disney comic artist (born 1942)

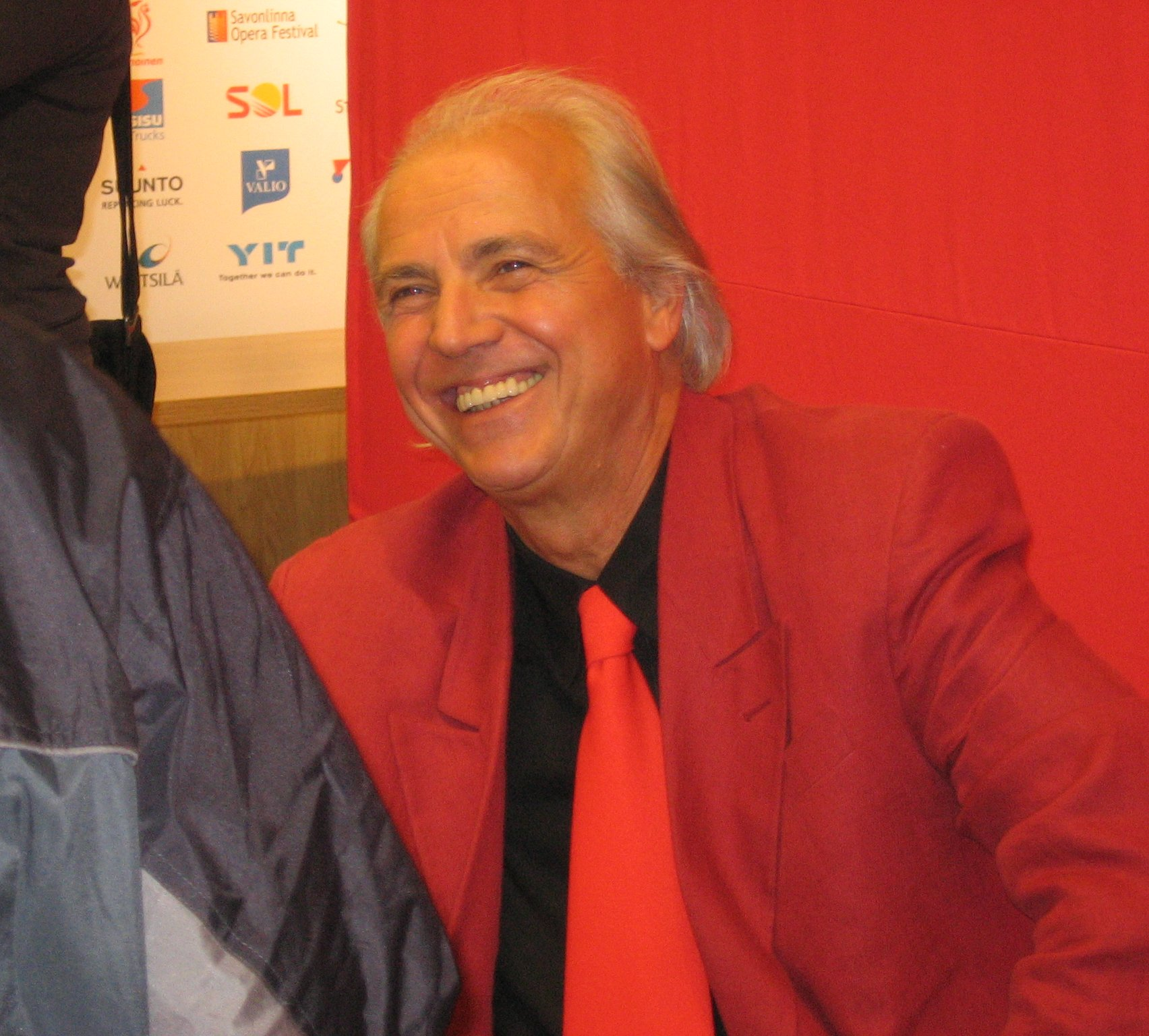
- Marco Rota in Helsinki
- Born: 18 September 1942 (age 84) Milan, Kingdom of Italy
- Areas: Artist, writer
- Notable works: Buon compleanno, Paperino! (From Egg to Duck)

Marco Rota (Italian: [ˈmarko ˈrɔːta]; born 18 September 1942) is an Italian Disney comic artist who served as editor-in-chief of Disney Italia from 1974 to 1988.

His Disney stories feature a style largely influenced by Carl Barks.

== Life and career ==
Rota was born in Milan. His first comic work, Steve Morgan il trappolatore, was published in 1958 in the magazine Collana Scudo. During the 1960s, he drew stories of Superman and Batman, as well as erotic comics.

Rota made his first Disney comic using the Mickey Mouse character in 1971. He would go on, however, to work primarily with Donald Duck and Scrooge McDuck stories. His best-known Disney-related work is Andold "Wild Duck" Temerary, Donald's Dark Age Scottish alter ego; as well as the 1984 story From Egg to Duck (Italian: Buon compleanno, Paperino!, lit. 'Happy birthday, Donald!'), Donald's biography.

In addition to working with established characters, Rota also does original work. As of 2012, he works for the Danish publisher Egmont.

In 2019, he returned to collaborate with Topolino with the story Ingorgopoli.
