= Giuseppe Perego =

Italian comics artist

- Born: 1 June 1915 Arcore, Italy
- Died: 7 December 1996 (aged 81) Arcore, Italy
- Area: Artist

Giuseppe Perego (1 June 1915 – 7 December 1996) was an Italian comic artist, active between the early 1930s and the early 1980s. He is known for his work in Disney comics.

== Life and career ==
Born in Arcore, Perego started his career at a very young age at Million Film, where he collaborated as an animator with the brothers Carlo and Vittorio Cossio. His early works as a cartoonist were several strips published in Corriere dei Piccoli and in Modellina (the comic supplement of the newspaper Il Mattino), and some stories of the series Scimmiottino.

After World War II, Perego created Buffalo Brill and drew other series for Edizioni Alpe, illustrated several Gim Toro and Dixy Scott comic books, and collaborated with the publisher Dardo and with the magazines Il Vittorioso and Il Monello. In 1952 he started a thirty-year-long collaboration with Disney, first as cover illustrator of Topolino and later drawing hundreds of stories and illustrations for many Disney publications. During this time he also collaborated with other publishers, co-creating with Andrea Lavezzolo the series Poldo e Poldino for Il Giorno dei Ragazzi and drawing several episodes of Fix and Foxi.
