= Kalle Anka & C:o =

Swedish Disney comics magazine

- The first issue, from September 1948
- Editor: Barbro Andersson
- Categories: Comics
- Frequency: Weekly
- Circulation: 65,300 (2010)
- Publisher: Barbro Andersson
- First issue: September 1948
- Company: Egmont Kärnan AB
- Country: Sweden
- Language: Swedish
- Website: kalleanka.se
- ISSN: 0345-6048

Kalle Anka & C:o (Donald Duck & Co) is a Swedish weekly Disney comics magazine, published by Egmont. The 52-page comic, launched in September 1948, is the overall best-selling Swedish comic magazine. In the early years, the comic printed translated stories from the United States, including Walt Disney's Comics and Stories, Four Color and other Dell Comics Disney titles. As Disney comics production waned in the United States in the 1960s, Kalle Anka began printing more European-produced content, from Scandinavia and Italy. Now, Kalle Anka & C:o and its Scandinavian sister editions Anders And & Co. (Denmark) and Donald Duck & Co (Norway) are identical, apart from the language.

Today, the comic is read by all age groups (as the back page to the first issue in 1948 put it: "for anyone between the ages of 3 and 90"). As of 2019, more than 3,300 issues have been published.

The magazine had a circulation of 225,000 in 1990 and 65,300 in 2010.

The original page count of the comic was 36 pages. Starting in 1992, the page count was increased to 48 pages, and in 1997, increased again to 64 pages. Today, the magazine consists of 52 pages. In the summer and some holidays, the number of pages is increased to 96 pages.

== Origin ==
The first Swedish Disney comics magazine was the annual Musse Piggs julbok (Mickey Mouse's Christmas Book), first published by Åhlén & Åkerlunds Förlags in 1936. Each 36-page annual reprinted a complete continuity from the US Mickey Mouse comic strip by Floyd Gottfredson, which had been appearing in Swedish newspapers and weekly magazines since 1930. In this case, "Christmas" was just the time of year that parents bought annuals for their kids, and had no relation to the content—the 1936 Julbok featured the strip's 1935 storyline "The Pirate Submarine", and the cover featured Mickey shooting at a nasty-looking V-1 submarine as the terrified crew jumps overboard.

There were five editions of Musse Piggs julbok, issued from 1936 to 1940. In 1941, the title was changed to Kalle Ankas julbok (Donald Duck's Christmas Book), and the book contained reprints of Al Taliaferro's Donald Duck comic strip, which had been running in Swedish newspapers since 1938. This tradition lasted for decades, printing Taliaferro strips with increasingly old-fashioned 1940s-style covers, until the final issue was released in 2017.

In 1937 and 1938, publishing house Åhlén & Åkerlunds Offsettryckeri published a weekly Musse Pigg Tidningen (Mickey Mouse Magazine), the Swedish equivalent of the American Mickey Mouse Magazine and British Mickey Mouse Weekly. This was the first Swedish comics magazine, and contained both Disney and non-Disney material. Each 20-page issue included mostly original material, written by Roland Romell and drawn by Lars Byland and Birger Allernäs. One regular feature was a one-page comic called "Småpiggarnas äventyr" ("The Adventures of the Little Mice"), starring Mickey's nephews Morty and Ferdie Fieldmouse fighting with Donald Duck. Another one-pager, "Defektivbyrån!" ("The Defective Agency"), was a redrawn version of a strip created by Wilfred Haughton for the UK magazine starring Goofy and Toby Tortoise. Serialized stories included "Musse Pigg i jättarnas land" ("Mickey Mouse in Giantland"), an adaptation of the 1933 short Giantland, and "Don Musse" ("Don Mouse"), a parody of Don Quixote starring Mickey as Quixote and Donald as Sancho Panza. The magazine lasted for 23 issues, and ceased publication in 1938.

By 1938, when Musse Pigg Tidningen stopped publishing, Donald had become a more popular character than Mickey, and Kalle Anka became the headline character for the majority of Swedish Disney comics titles from then on.

== 1948: Kalle Anka & C:o ==
In 1948, Danish publishing group Gutenberghus acquired a license from Walt Disney Productions to publish comics in Scandinavia. In September, Kalle Anka & C:o was launched in Sweden. Norway followed in December 1948 with Donald Duck & Co, with Denmark's Anders And & Co. launching in March 1949, and Finland's Aku Ankka in December 1951.

At the beginning, the magazine was 36 pages long, and the comics and covers were all reprints from American Disney comics, especially Walt Disney's Comics and Stories, the flagship of the American Disney magazines. For the first five issues, the contents were printed half in full color and half in two colors (black and red), alternating with each two-page spread. With the sixth issue in February 1949, the entire comic was printed in full color.

Like WDC&S, the early issues of Kalle Anka & C:o typically began with a 10-page Donald Duck story by Carl Barks; the first issue featured "Fireman Donald" from WDC&S #86 (Nov 1947). The second feature was a "Lilla Stygga Vargen" ("Li'l Bad Wolf") story by Gil Turner or Paul Murry. This would be followed by a two-page illustrated text story, and then two to eight pages of other material from the comic featuring characters like Pluto, Dumbo, Thumper and Chip 'n' Dale. The rest of the pages were filled with reprints of gag strips from the Mickey Mouse and Donald Duck comic strips. An issue of Kalle Anka wasn't a reprint of any specific WDC&S issue; the contents came from a spread of issues from the previous couple of years.

About 50,000 copies of the first issue were printed; now only a few hundred survive. According to Seriesamlarna, it's Sweden's most valuable comic book, with an estimated value of 250,000 SEK. In 1999, a copy was sold for 170,000 SEK.

The characters on the first issue's iconic red cover were copied from other sources. The figure of Donald, looking and pointing up at the title, was lifted from a panel in Taliaferro's 12 February 1944 Donald Duck comic strip, and the three nephews from a panel in Barks' story "Wired" (WDC&S #90, March 1948).

== 1950s: Walt Disney's serier and Kalle Anka 100-pagers ==
Starting in 1950, Kalle Anka & C:o started publishing occasional "B-number" issues, mostly printing translations of Dell's Four Color one-shots. The first B-number was the adaptation of the new film Cinderella, published in the US as Four Color #272 (April 1950) and in Sweden as Kalle Anka & C:o #11B/1950 (Nov 1950). The next year brought two extra issues. The first was a version of the 1937-38 Snow White and the Seven Dwarfs adaptation from the Silly Symphony comic strip, which was published as Kalle Anka & C:o #9B/1951. The second was an adaptation of Alice in Wonderland, published in the US as Four Color #331 (April 1951) and in Sweden as Kalle Anka & C:o #1951/11B (Nov 1951).

The B-numbered issues continued to come out at irregular intervals over the next few years, including longer stories from Barks' Donald Duck one-shots and issues of the Dell Giants like Vacation Parade (#5B/1953) and Christmas Parade (#11B/1952 and #11B/1953). The first issue of Farbor Joakim (Uncle Scrooge) -- the classic "Only a Poor Old Man"—was published in the US as Four Color #386 in March 1952, and in Sweden as Kalle Anka & C:o #1B/1954 in January 1954. The final B-number was #2B/1954 (Feb 1954), a Peter Pan & Captain Hook story.

Starting in March 1954, the B-numbered issues became their own monthly series, Walt Disney's serier (Walt Disney's Comics). This series began with Little Hiawatha #3/1954, printing content from the US Four Color #439 (Dec 1952). Issues were published monthly through the end of 1956.

The new series included one-shots from various characters like Långben (Goofy, 4/1954), Lilla Stygga Vargen (Li'l Bad Wolf, 5/1954) and Pluto (4/1955). It also published some of Carl Barks' early Uncle Scrooge stories, including issues titled "Farbror Joakims Pengar i Fara" ("Uncle Scrooge's Money in Danger", printing "The Horseradish Story" and "The Round Money Bin", 3/1955) and "Farbror Joakim och den tokige professorn" ("Uncle Scrooge and the Mad Professor", printing "The Mysterious Stone Ray", 10/1955). The series also continued the practice of publishing an annual Christmas Parade issue.

Along with the usual Disney comics fare, there were also five issues featuring adaptations of live-action Disney productions, including The Sword and the Rose and 20,000 Leagues Under the Sea. These issues didn't have the Walt Disney's serier title, but are considered to be "C-numbers".

This incarnation of Walt Disney's serier ended at the end of 1956, as the pace of publishing increased. In 1957, Kalle Anka & C:o went to a bimonthly schedule, so the "one-shots" and longer stories were cut into parts for serialization in the main comic. The comic stopped relying on Taliaferro's Donald Duck strips to fill the pages, and began publishing longer stories by Barks, as well as Paul Murry's Mickey/Goofy mystery serials, cut into multiple parts for serial publication at the back of the comic.

1957 also brought a new tradition: Kalle Anka 100-sidors, annual 100-page issues with a seasonal theme. (They're also known as Kalle Anka säsongshäften, or seasonal books.) One or two of these came out every year from 1957 to 1996. The first was Kalle Ankas karusell (Donald Duck Carousel) in winter 1957, followed by Kalle Anka's Sommarlov (Summer Vacation) in 1958. The 100-pagers contained a number of 4-page or 8-page comics stories from Dell Giants or back-up stories from Four Color, as well as games, puzzles, magic tricks, educational text features and other filler material. 1958 brought another winter special, Kalle Ankas lekstuga (Treasury), and these continued as an annual tradition. In 1962, the annual 100-pagers took on a Christmas theme, first called Kalle Ankas kul i jul (Fun at Christmas) and then Kalle Ankas kuljul (Christmas Fun) from 1963 to 1974.

In July 1959, Kalle Anka & C:o went to a weekly schedule. At this point, each issue featured an eclectic mix from Dell Comics' line, including stories from Walt Disney's Comics and Stories, Mickey Mouse, Donald Duck, Uncle Scrooge and all of the Four Color one-shots.

== 1960s: New material ==
In the 1960s Western Publishing was producing fewer new stories, creating a shortage of material. To solve this, Gutenberghus obtained a license to start producing its own Disney material.

Gutenberghus' first artist was Nils Rydahl, who began by drawing covers for the Scandinavian magazines; the first published in Sweden was the cover of 1/1960. After a couple of years, Gutenberghus also started to create their own series, including those drawn by Rydahl, with others writing the scripts. The first story, "Kalle Anka konkurrerar med konstnären Rembrandt" ("Donald Duck in the Footsteps of Rembrandt"), was written by Knut Dokker and published in issue 36/1962 (Sept 1962). When Rydahl started, he was obviously influenced by Taliaferro, but soon developed his own style.

Rydahl also drew some remakes of American Mickey Mouse stories, turning the mouse characters into ducks. His first was published in Kalle Anka 14/1963 as "Elefantungen" ("The Baby Elephant"), originally drawn as "Mickey Mouse and the Li'l Lost Elephant" by Bill Wright for Four Color #411 (Aug 1952). Rydahl's version took Mickey and Goofy out of the story, and replaced them with Donald, Grandma Duck, and Huey, Dewey and Louie. Rydahl continued to draw covers, stories and single pages until 1977.

With more material coming in, the publishers reintroduced the Walt Disney's serier title in 1962, with six issues published a year. The series was entirely reprints of American Four Color issues, beginning with the one-shot "This Is Your Life, Donald Duck", a 32-page celebration of Donald's life by Vic Lockman and Tony Strobl, published as Four Color #1109 in August 1960. The Swedish version, "Sånt är livet, Kalle Anka", was the new Walt Disney's serier #1 in May 1962. The series continued printing longer stories and translations of Four Color one-shots. In this incarnation of Walt Disney's serier, the numbering was sequential, and ran until issue #26 in 1966. It resumed monthly publication in 1967, and ran until 1977.

In 1964, Kalle Anka & C:o started to include stories created by the "Disney Studio Program", a Disney unit producing comic book stories exclusively for foreign consumption. The first was an Oppfinar-Jocke (Gyro Gearloose) story published in June in issue 24/1964: "Tuffa tag i varuhuset" ("Rough Sale-ing"), drawn by Tony Strobl and John Liggera. By the end of 1964, these "S-code" stories were a regular feature of Kalle Anka's content, sometimes taking up the whole issue.

In January 1965, stories from the Italian publisher Mondadori began to appear in Kalle Anka & C:o. The first Italian story began in issue 3/1965, "Salte Pedro går till sjöss igen" ("Donald Duck Finds Pirate Gold... Again!"), originally published as "Bacicin riprende il mare" in Almanacco Topolino #71 (Nov 1962). The Italian comics were being printed in "pocket book" size—small paperbacks, with 100 pages in each issue—so they were longer than most stories published in Kalle Anka, 22 to 30 pages each. They were also drawn with 3 tiers of panels, rather than the traditional American-style 4 tiers. For Kalle Anka, they were split up into multiple parts, and were sometimes extensively re-edited.

From 1967 to 1972 several shorter series from the Netherlands, many with Little Hiawatha in the lead role, were also seen in Kalle Anka & C:o.

In 1969, the annual 100-pagers increased from one a year to two, with the return of Kalle Ankas sommarlov in the summer, and the continued tradition of Kalle Ankas julkul in the winter.

== Late 1960s: Kalle Ankas Pocket ==
Meanwhile, in the mid-60s, many European publishers began introducing monthly digest-sized Disney pocket books, including France's Mickey Parade (1966) and Germany's Lustiges Taschenbuch (1967).

In Denmark, Gutenberghus published the first issue of its 260-page digest, Jumbobog, in May 1968. This was published in Swedish in June, as Kalle Ankas Pocket. (The same issue was also published that year as Lustiges Taschenbuch #3 and Norway's Donald Pocket #1.)

The first issue of Kalle Ankas Pocket featured Uncle Scrooge, and was titled "Tuff till tusen miljarder" ("Tough to the Thousand Billions"). It was a Swedish translation of the Italian I Classici di Walt Disney (Walt Disney's Classics) issue #23 (Nov 1966), which collected stories from Topolino linked by a newly written frame story. Most of the stories in the early digests were from Italy, but occasionally US stories appeared, including Carl Barks stories.

The digests were initially produced twice a year, then went to three times a year in 1971 (starting with Kalle Ankas Pocket #7) and then five times a year in 1978 (starting with #24). The popular title is still running today.

== 1970s: Walt Disney's klassiker, Farbror Joakim and Kalle Anka Extra ==
In 1970, the Italian series returned to Kalle Anka & C:o, where they were a recurring feature during the first half of the 1970s.

Walt Disney's serier, which had mostly been printing longer stories from the US Four Color series, began publishing shorter Italian stories as well, with each issue still focusing on a single character. The last two film adaptations were published in the series in 1971, One Hundred and One Dalmatians (#1/1971) and Dumbo (#4/1971). The 1972 adaptations (The Aristocrats and Bedknobs and Broomsticks) were published as extra issues.

In 1973, four film adaptations were released under the title 50 glada år - En Disney-klassiker (50 Happy Years - A Disney Classic), and in 1975, this turned into its own title, Walt Disney's klassiker. This title published four issues a year. In the first two years, the comic continued to publish adaptations and stories based on Disney animated movies, including The Sword in the Stone and The Jungle Book.

In 1976, the monthly pocket book Farbror Joakim (Uncle Scrooge) was launched, containing six stories a month. Each issue was headlined by a long Italian story, usually 20-40 pages, that featured Uncle Scrooge. The final story was also a long duck-character story, either Italian or Disney Studio, usually 15-20 pages. The four middle stories were mostly from the Disney Studio, with some material from Italy and the struggling US titles. Despite the title, most of the four middle stories were about Mickey Mouse, Goofy or Li'l Bad Wolf. Once Farbror Joakim started, the Italian comics appeared more rarely in the weekly Kalle Anka & C:o, and stopped completely after 1979.

Meanwhile, Italy's I Classici di Walt Disney ended in 1976, which was the major source for both of the pocket books. There was still a back catalog of Italian stories that Kalle Ankas Pocket and Farbror Joakim could use, but they started to exhaust the supply by the early 80s. Starting in 1982, the pocket books were assembled by Gutenbhergus specifically for the Scandinavian market, which put an end to the "frame stories" that were borrowed from the Italian pockets.

With the longer stories moved to Farbror Joakim, and with film adaptations in Walt Disney's klassiker, the content of the monthly Walt Disney's serier began to resemble the weekly Kalle Anka & C:o. In 1977, Walt Disney's serier was retitled Kalle Anka Extra. The practice of giving each issue a title stopped with the new comic. The comic began with mostly Italian and American stories, but began to feature an increasing amount of material from Denmark, mostly about Mickey Mouse. The comic continued under that name until 1980.

Also in mid-1977, Walt Disney's klassiker began publishing stories from American comics, including some Carl Barks duck stories, issues of The Phantom Blot, and an annual Jul i Ankeborg (Christmas in Duckburg) issue. In 1982, Walt Disney's klassiker was retitled Walt Disney's godbitar (Walt Disney's goodies). The retitled comic featured a mixed bag of content, including longer Carl Barks stories, Paul Murry's Mickey/Goofy serials, adaptations of Alice in Wonderland and Snow White, "Mickey and the Sleuth" stories, and Disney Studios' Goofy movie parodies. The comic ran for two and a half years, ending in 1984.

In 1978, Donald Duck's superhero alter ego first appeared in Kalle Ankas Pocket—Stål-Kalle (Steel-Donald), widely known as Paperinik in Europe and as the Duck Avenger in English. Issue #28 was titled Stål-Kalle i farten (Steel-Donald on the Move), and this was followed by Stål-Kalle-focused issues released about once a year.

== 1970s and 80s: Carl Barks appreciation ==
In the early 70s, as Carl Barks retired from Disney comics work, publishers began to recognize the unique attachment that readers felt for his Duck stories. A series of hardcover albums began in 1974 called Kalle Ankas Bästisar (Donald Duck's Best Friends), subtitled Gamla goda serier ur Kalle Anka & C:o (Good old comics from Kalle Anka & C:o) which collected Barks' short stories, in the order that they were printed in Europe. The set was also published in Denmark, Finland, the Netherlands and Norway. Curiously, Barks' name wasn't used in the series; his stories were originally published without attribution, and his name was only discovered by fans in the 1960s. 38 books were published from 1974 to 1994.

In 1984, another set of Carl Barks books was released, this time printed in the order that they were originally published in America. These books were originally titled Kalle Anka: ett urval äventyr av Carl Barks för första gången i Sverige (Donald Duck: a selection of stories by Carl Barks for the first time in Sweden), but they're known to fans as Kalle Anka Guldbok (Donald Duck's Gold Books) because of their gold-colored covers. Starting with the third book, the subtitle changed to Gamla, goda äventyr av Carl Barks (Good old stories by Carl Barks). 17 books were published annually from 1984 to 2000, with an extra edition of Carl Barks bästa (Best of Carl Barks) published in 2001, and Carl Barks julbook (Carl Barks Christmas Stories) in 2003.

== 1980s: Musse Pigg & C:o ==
In 1980, Kalle Anka Extra, which had been publishing increasing numbers of Danish Mickey Mouse stories, was renamed Musse Pigg & C:o (Mickey Mouse & Co). This comic was very successful, and continues to this day.

While the title and cover star focused on Mickey Mouse, most of the content was actually Duck-related, and for the first three years, the first story in each issue was a Donald Duck story. Most of the content in the early issues were American and Italian, but in 1982, Danish content began to take over. Starting in 1984, the lead story in each issue was a Mickey Mouse story, and the content was split evenly between American and Danish stories. However, starting with 3/1987, the American stories disappeared, and the lead position was taken by Mickey Mouse stories from the French Le Journal de Mickey.

In 1982, Hemmets Journal also began publishing Oppfinnar-Jockes Kluriga Magasin (Gyro Gearloose's Puzzle Magazine), which contained puzzles and short comic strips for younger readers. The magazine was released quarterly, with extra thick summer and Christmas editions. The magazine moved to Egmont in 2000, and ended in 2007.

In 1987, the Farbror Joakim pocket book reduced from twelve issues a year to six. The book alternated months with Björnligan (Beagle Boys), a 100-page bimonthly comic which began in 1986. The comic mostly contained Italian stories, and was essentially the same as Farbror Joakim with a different title; they were included in the same subscription. Despite the title, the Beagle Boys did not appear in every issue.

Also in 1987, the seasonal 100-pagers got new titles—the summer special was retitled Fest med Kalle Anka (Party with Donald Duck), and the winter special Kul med Kalle Anka (Fun with Donald Duck). The summer special continued through 1996; the winter special ended in 1994.

The annual 100-page Kalle Anka Maxi was also introduced in 1987, which reprinted three 1970s issues of Walt Disney's serier per issue. In the early 90s, Maxi also reprinted stories from Kalle Anka Extra and Musse Pigg & C:o; it ceased publication in 1996.

The first Duck story by Don Rosa was published in Musse Pigg & C:o in September 1989; the story was the Halloween-themed 10-pager "Fit to Be Pied" (called Samling vid pumpan in Swedish). Rosa's stories then moved to Kalle Anka & C:o for the first issue in 1990, and were well-received; Rosa stories appeared in 14 of the 52 issues that year.

== 1990s: Format changes ==
In 1992, the publication rate was adjusted. The weekly Kalle Anka & C:o was extended from 36 to 48 pages, and the monthly Musse Pigg & C:o began publishing 64-page double-numbered issues every two months, effectively becoming a bimonthly magazine.

A third title was brought into the Farbror Joakim/Björnligan pocket book rotation in 1994: Musses Mysterier (Mickey Mystery), which featured long stories from Denmark about Mickey Mouse solving mysteries. These were more hard-boiled than previous Mickey Mouse detective stories, with more violent and deadly villains. Mickey was accompanied by Minnie and the police officer Chief O'Hara, and the Phantom Blot occasionally appeared. Only eight issues of Musses Mysterier were published in Sweden, although the original Danish version went on for 26 issues. Some Musses Mysterier stories popped up in other Disney comics over the following years.

1995 saw the first release of an annual Christmas pocket, Kalle Anka och hans vänner önskar God Jul! (Donald Duck and His Friends Wish You Merry Christmas!) This was published until 2014.

In 1996, both Björnligan and Musses Mysterier were replaced by Walt Disney's äventyrsserier (Walt Disney's Adventure Comics), which was similar to the Farbror Joakim content. The extra title was dropped in 1999, when Farbror Joakim went back to monthly production. The Farbror Joakim pocket book was cancelled at the end of 2001.

In 1996, the newsstand magazines changed again, with Kalle Anka & C:o growing from 48 to 64 pages, and Musse Pigg & C:o dropping the double-numbering, and becoming a 40-page monthly comic again. In 1998, Musse Pigg & C:o went back to bimonthly publishing.

Stål-Kalle, Donald Duck's superhero alter ego, had been regularly featured in Kalle Ankas Pocket since 1978, but he got his own monthly comic in 1997, a translation of the Italian PKNA - Paperinik New Adventures. The series lasted for 112 issues, ending in 2006.

The contents of Musse Pigg & C:o had always been new stories from Denmark, but in 1999, they started reprinting stories from 1980s issues of Kalle Anka, with one new short story from France.

== 2000s: Continuing development ==
A bimonthly Kalle Anka crossword puzzle magazine, Kalle Anka & C:o korsord, was published in 13 issues from 2002 to 2004.

The annual summer and winter specials had stopped in the mid-90s, but the concept was revived in 2003 with Kalle Anka & C:o Sommarlov (Summer Vacation), an annual summer magazine packaged with toys, which included comics as well as ideas for crafts projects. The Sommarlov title lasted through 2007; in 2008, it was retitled Kalle Anka & C:o Sommarkul (Summer Fun). Since 2008, there have also been Vinterkul (Winter Fun) issues. Starting in 2016, various themed specials included Julkul (Christmas Fun), Aqvakul (Swimming Fun), Vårkul (Our Fun) and Hjulkul (Driving Fun).

2005 brought a new spinoff of Kalle Ankas Pocket—a smaller 300-page version called Mini Pocket, which reprinted stories from the Kalle Anka and Farbor Joakim pocket books. The cover on each issue was graphically simple, just showing a Disney character on a single-color background. Six issues were published a year until issue #29, at the end of 2009.

In 2006, there were also attempts to extend the brand to include a Donald Duck-themed Sudoku magazine (Kalle Anka & C:o Sudoku, 8 issues) and a football magazine (Kalle Anka & C:o Kick-It!, 6 issues).

Musse Pigg & C:o changed again beginning with issue 3/2006—it swelled to 52 pages, and began publishing material from the successful Italian Disney comic X-Mickey, a horror-inspired comic about a supernatural world, where Mickey was friends with Pipwolf, a Goofy-like werewolf. This focus lasted for more than a decade, until 2/2017, and X-Mickey stories still show up every once in a while.

Kalle Anka & C:o was reduced from 64 to 52 pages in 2009.

Kalle Anka Extra returned in 2010, and featured Duck stories by Don Rosa until 2017. Starting in 2018, the series features Duck stories by Carl Barks, and is still running.

Ankeborgs Samlarpocket (Duckburg's Collector Pocket) began publishing in 2016, a bimonthly pocket book. Each issue collects a particular miniseries like Stjärnkrig (Star Wars), Stål-Kalle (Steel-Duck) and Kalle som liten (Donald Duckling). This title also publishes the annual Kalle Anka och hans vänner önskar god jul! Christmas special.

A new title, Kalle Anka Junior, was introduced in 2019, as a quarterly aimed at younger children. The magazine features simpler comics with larger boxes and text, as well as puzzles and games.

=== Editorial features ===
Over the years, the content has also included space for articles, editorial material and reader contributions. For a long period in the 1970s, 1980s and 1990s, "Grandma Anka" was responsible for the majority of these pages - behind this pseudonym hid the editor and publisher Signe Wiberg. In recent years, this type of material has existed under a number of different headings - the most popular being "Svinesson", a pig journalist character who only appeared in one 1951 Carl Barks story, "Gladstone's Luck". The obnoxious pig works for the AnkeborgsPosten (Duckburg Post), and answers questions sent in by readers. Fråga Svinesson (Ask Svinesson) began in the early 2000s, taking questions about the Duck characters, Ankeborg and sometimes personal questions about Svinesson himself. In his answers, Svinesson often distorts the author's name, changes the subject, and says rude things. Svinesson's column stopped appearing around 2018.

Kul med Kalle (Fun with Donald) is a page of jokes, some of them submitted by readers through the magazine's website. Tips & Trix offers little facts, tips and jokes. Knep & Knåp (Tricks & Buttons) is a page of puzzles.

== Reprints ==
Facsimiles of the first two decades of the comic were reprinted by Egmont in large hardcover collections, Kalle Anka & C:o: Den kompletta årgången (Kalle Anka & C:o: The Complete Vintage) from 1998 to 2015. The 97-volume set covers all issues of the magazine released from the beginning in September 1948 through December 1970, including the B-numbered issues.

A companion series, Walt Disney's serier: Den kompletta årgången, was published in six volumes from 2008 to 2009. The set covers all issues of Walt Disney's serier from 1954 to 1956.

A nine-book collection, Don Rosas samlade verk (Don Rosa's complete works), was published from 2011 to 2014.

Egmont began publishing a complete 30-volume hardcover collection of Carl Barks' work, Carl Barks Ankeborg, in 2014. The series is generally chronological, but in two parts—the first eighteen volumes cover the period from 1952 to 1967 (starting with Barks' seminal Uncle Scrooge story "Back to the Klondike"), volumes 19 to 28 loop back to the beginning to cover 1942 to 1952, and the final two volumes cover 1967–1972, and 1972–1994.

== Character names ==
The Disney comics characters names used in Sweden are:

Donald Duck universe

- Kalle Anka: Donald Duck
- Knatte, Fnatte och Tjatte: Huey, Dewey and Louie
- Farbror Joakim / Joakim von Anka: Scrooge McDuck
- Kajsa Anka: Daisy Duck
- Farmor Anka: Grandma Duck
- Oppfinnar-Jocke: Gyro Gearloose
- Stål-Kalle: Paperinik
- Gröngölingarna: Junior Woodchucks
- Kicki, Pippi och Titti: April, May and June
- Mårten Gås: Gus Goose
- Alexander Lukas: Gladstone Gander
- Knase Anka: Fethry Duck
- Björnligan: Beagle Boys
- Magica de Hex: Magica De Spell

Mickey Mouse universe

- Musse Pigg: Mickey Mouse
- Mimmi Pigg: Minnie Mouse
- Långben: Goofy
- Pluto: Pluto
- Svarte Petter: Black Pete
- Piff och Puff (Chip och Chop 1948-1953): Chip 'n' Dale
- Teddi och Freddi: Morty and Ferdie
- Klasse: Horace Horsecollar
- Klarabella: Clarabelle Cow

Other

- Lilla Stygga Vargen: Li'l Bad Wolf
- Stora Stygga Vargen: Big Bad Wolf
- Bror Duktig, Bror Lustig och Bror Hurtig: The Three Little Pigs
- Bror Kanin: Br'er Rabbit
- Bror Räv och Bror Björn: Br'er Fox and Br'er Bear

== See also ==
- Aku Ankka
- List of Swedish Disney publications (on Swedish Wikipedia)
