= Donald Duck (disambiguation) =

Donald Duck is a fictional cartoon character created by The Walt Disney Company.

Donald Duck may also refer to:

== Disney comics ==
- Donald Duck (American comic book), an American comic book, 1952–present
- Donald Duck Weekblad, a Dutch comic book, 1952–present
- Donald Duck (comic strip), a 1938-1995 newspaper comic strip

== Other ==
- Donald Duck (film series), a 1937-1961 short film series
- Donald Duck (orange juice), a brand of orange juice
- DD tank, nicknamed "Donald Duck tank", a type of amphibious swimming tank
- "Donald Duck", a song by Don Patterson with Booker Ervin from the album Hip Cake Walk

== See also ==
- Donald Duck Party
- Donald Duk, a 1991 novel for children written by Frank Chin
- Donald Mallard, aka Ducky Mallard, a fictional character from CBS series NCIS and played by David McCallum
