= Evron =

Evron may refer to:

- Évron, a community in Mayenne, France.
- Evron, a kibbutz near Nahariya, Northern District, Israel.
- Evron, the fictional emperor of the planet Evron and the founder of the Evroniani Empire as well as the name of the planet-turned-spaceship on which Evrons originated in the Paperinik New Adventures Disney comic.
- Rubus chamaemorus, the cloudberry, also known as evron in Scotland
