= PK: Out of the Shadows =

2002 video game

- North American cover art for PlayStation 2
- Developer: Ubi Soft Casablanca
- Publisher: Ubi Soft
- Producers: Abdelhak Elguss; Luigi Proiore
- Designers: Jason Arsenault; Mustapha Mahrach
- Programmers: Abderrahim Agoumal; Abderrahim Boukriss; Boujemaa El Hiba; Hassan Boulmarfouf; Lhoucine Khabir; Mohamed Berra; Salahedone Essediki
- Artist: Gabriel Villatte
- Writer: Guido Martina
- Composer: Daniel Masson
- Platforms: GameCube; PlayStation 2
- Release: PlayStation 2: EU: October 4, 2002; NA: November 1, 2002; GameCube: EU: November 29, 2002; NA: December 3, 2002
- Genres: Action-adventure, platformer
- Mode: Single-player

PK: Out of the Shadows (known as Donald Duck PK in Europe) is a 2002 action-adventure video game developed by Ubi Soft Casablanca and published by Ubi Soft. It stars Donald Duck as Paperinik or "PK" as he battles to stop the Evron Empire from taking over Earth. The game is based on the Italian comic book series PK – Paperinik New Adventures.

The game was released on October 4, 2002, to mixed reviews from critics; some praised the voice acting, but criticized some level designs and lack of originality.

== Plot ==
Donald Duck works as a security guard in the Ducklair Tower. He falls asleep and starts dreaming of Daisy Duck and his nephews Huey, Dewey and Louie teasing him. He wishes he was a superhero. An artificial intelligence known as One agrees to help him. He is given a future technological weapon, a new voice, and the new name PK. Before PK can begin his training, they are alerted to the Evronians attack on Earth, prompting One to send PK out to defeat them as 'on the job training'.

== Gameplay ==
Players assume the control of PK, navigating 3D levels from a third person perspective.

PK uses an 'X-Transformer' arm device throughout the game, which functions as a utility for defense and movement, primarily firing laser shots and to hover over large gaps. More abilities are unlocked for the X-Transformer as the player progresses, unlocking a super punch for shattering weak ground, a supercharge to break enemy shields, a remote X-Transformer to navigate tight spaces and a more powerful costume variant.

As players traverse the levels, they will collect 'Activation Stars', green circular icons sporting One's face. These function as to power checkpoints for the player, requiring 15 to activate it so that should the player die, they'll return to that previously active checkpoint. The player will also find other weapon variants that give the X-Transformer a limited amount of more powerful shots such as fire bullets or rockets.

Also during certain level portions, the player will encounter captured scientists that must be found and rescued before the timer counts down, otherwise they will be teleported away, requiring the player to try again another time. There are six scientists per level (excluding boss battles and the Evronian Mothership), and 40 scientists must be rescued in order to access the final mothership levels.

== Reception ==
Reception

Aggregate scores
Aggregator	Score
GameRankings	(GC) 53.68% (PS2) 51.41%
Metacritic	(PS2) 49/100 (GC) 46/100

Review scores
Publication	Score
Game Informer	4.7/10
GameSpot	3.2/10
GameSpy	(PS2) 62% (GC) 2/5
GameZone	(GC) 6/10 (PS2) 5.4/10
IGN	4/10
Nintendo Power	3.3/5
Nintendo World Report	4/10
Official U.S. PlayStation Magazine	2.5/5
PlayStation: The Official Magazine	7/10
X-Play	2/5

PK: Out of the Shadows received "generally unfavorable reviews", according to review aggregator Metacritic. GameRankings gave the PlayStation 2 version a score of 51.41%, while they gave the GameCube version a score of 53.68%.

GameSpot gave the game a "poor" rating of 3.2 out of 10 and said, "Unless playing poorly made games is your pastime, avoiding this game is highly suggested." David Smith of IGN gave both the GameCube and PlayStation 2 versions a 4 out of 10, writing for the PlayStation 2 he said, "Yes, Donald Duck is a superhero. No, it's not much fun.", while for the GameCube version he wrote, "We sure do love Donald, but his latest game is a heartbreaker."

Scott Steinberg of GameSpy gave the GameCube version two stars out of five and commented, "Well sweet, how ... completely disheartening! It's hardly a good setup for a winning platform game." Brad Kane of Extended Play also gave the game a two stars out of five, saying, "If you're really thirsting for some Donald Duck platform action in your life, then "Out of the Shadows" will at least provide enough of a challenge to keep you on the jump. But if you're not a devotee and don't need to see PK make his videogame debut, then you can leave this one for the Evronians."
