= Donald Duck =

Disney cartoon character

- Mickey Mouse & Friends/Donald Duck/Silly Symphony character
- First appearance: The Wise Little Hen (1934)
- Created by: Dick Lundy; Walt Disney
- Designed by: Walt Disney
- Voiced by: Clarence Nash (1934–1985); Tony Anselmo (1985–present); Daniel Ross (2017–2021)
- Developed by: Dick Lundy; Fred Spencer; Carl Barks; Jack King; Jack Hannah

In-universe information
- Full name: Donald Fauntleroy Duck
- Aliases: Maui Mallard; Frank Duck; Fred; Paperinik (a.k.a. Duck Avenger and Superduck outside native Italy); DoubleDuck; Unca Donald (by his nephews)
- Nickname: Don
- Species: Duck
- Gender: Male
- Family: Duck family Clan McDuck
- Significant other: Daisy Duck
- Relatives: Scrooge McDuck (maternal uncle); Ludwig Von Drake (paternal uncle); Della Duck (twin sister); Huey, Dewey, and Louie (nephews); Gladstone Gander (cousin)
- Nationality: American
- Date of birth: June 9

Donald Fauntleroy Duck is a cartoon character created by Walt Disney and Dick Lundy. Donald is an anthropomorphic white duck with a yellow-orange bill, legs, and feet. He typically wears a sailor shirt and cap with a bow tie. Often described by critics and scholars as a global pop culture icon of animation, Donald is known for his semi-intelligible speech and his volatile, boisterous, and high-energy personality. Along with his friend and rival Mickey Mouse, Donald is one of the most recognizable characters owned by the Walt Disney Company, and was included in TV Guide's list of the 50 greatest cartoon characters of all time in 2002, as well as earning a star on the Hollywood Walk of Fame. He is Disney's most prolific cartoon character.

Donald Duck has appeared in over 150 animated short films in the golden age of American animation, several of which were recognized at the Academy Awards. Donald's first appearance was in the Silly Symphony film The Wise Little Hen (1934), but was reworked as a temperamental comic foil to Mickey Mouse in Orphan's Benefit. In the 1930s, he typically appeared as part of a comic trio with Mickey and Goofy and was given his own film series starting with Don Donald (1937). These films introduced Donald's love interest and permanent girlfriend Daisy Duck and often included his three nephews Huey, Dewey, and Louie. Donald gradually outshone Mickey, who was relegated to a side character in newer cartoons while Donald maintained his own series until 1961.

After the film Chips Ahoy (1956), Donald appeared primarily in educational films before eventually returning to theatrical animation in Mickey's Christmas Carol (1983). His final appearance in a theatrical film was in Fantasia 2000 (1999). However, since then Donald has appeared in direct-to-video features such as Mickey, Donald, Goofy: The Three Musketeers (2004), television series such as Mickey Mouse Clubhouse (2006–2016), and video games such as QuackShot (1991), Donald Duck: Goin' Quackers (2000) and the Kingdom Hearts series (2002–present).

In addition to animation, Donald is well known worldwide for his appearances in comics. Donald was most famously drawn by Al Taliaferro, Carl Barks, and Don Rosa. Barks, in particular, is credited for greatly expanding the "Donald Duck universe", the world in which Donald lives, and creating many additional characters such as Donald's rich uncle Scrooge McDuck. Donald has been a popular character in Europe, particularly in Nordic countries. In Italy, Donald is a major character in many comics in which several alter egos were also introduced, including a juvenile version named Paperino Paperotto, and a superhero alter ego named Paperinik (known as Duck Avenger in the US and Super Duck in the UK).

== Characteristics ==
=== Appearance ===
Donald Duck is portrayed as a white duck with a yellow-orange bill, legs, and webbed feet, the color pattern of a domestic duck of the American Pekin breed, but instead of wings he has arms and three-fingered hands with opposable thumbs. He usually wears an originally black, later blue sailor shirt with white or yellow accents, a black or red bow tie, and a blue sailor's cap, but no pants or footwear.

=== Voice ===
Donald's voice
Donald's voice in Modern Inventions (1937)

The character is known for possessing an only partly intelligible voice, developed by Donald's original performer, Clarence Nash. During an interview, Tony Anselmo revealed that "Most people believe that Donald's voice is done squeezing air through the cheek, that is not true. I can't reveal how it's actually done, but it is definitely not done by squeezing air through the cheek. The Hanna-Barbera character 'Yakky Doodle' is done that way. Donald Duck is not." Nash reputedly originally developed the voice as that of a "nervous baby goat" before Walt Disney interpreted it as sounding like a duck.

=== Personality ===
Donald Duck is known for his fiery temper.

Donald Duck is portrayed as an impatient, immature, and arrogant duck with a pessimistic attitude and an insecure disposition. In addition, his two dominant personality traits are his fiery temper and his cynical attitude to life. Donald typically starts off every cartoon in a jolly mood until certain events happen to anger him, in part due to his antagonistic behavior, jealousy or general incompetence. His rage proves to be disadvantageous when he goes too far, though he is capable of temporarily controlling his temper, if not enough to handle his conflicts. However, he is capable of courage and perseverance, able to defeat threats of any kind and complete difficult tasks when combined with his outbursts.

Donald has a mischievous side, taking delight in causing chaos as well as imposing superiority on Chip and Dale and Huey, Dewey and Louie. As animator Fred Spencer put it:

The Duck gets a big kick out of imposing on other people or annoying them, but he immediately loses his temper when the tables are turned. In other words, he can dish it out, but he can't take it.

However, with a few exceptions, Donald means no ill will and is apologetic at times. In Truant Officer Donald, for example, when he is tricked into believing he has accidentally killed Huey, Dewey, and Louie, he shows great regret, blaming himself. His nephews appear in the form of angels, and he willingly endures a kick by one of them—that is, of course, until he realizes he has been tricked, whereupon he promptly loses his temper.

Donald is also a bit of a poseur. As a jack of all trades, he typically overestimates his abilities out of hubris, so that when he sets out to make good on his boasts, he fails spectacularly to hilarious effect. A running gag in the Donald Duck comics involves him being physically unhealthy and unmotivated to exercise in spite of his appearance and achievements. Donald had a stint in the U.S. Army during World War II that culminated with him serving as a commando in the film Commando Duck, and he was frequently away serving in the U.S. Navy in the television cartoon series DuckTales.

=== Friendly rivalry with Mickey Mouse ===
Donald is occasionally shown as a foil of Mickey Mouse, being envious of his success and refusing to be second banana, in spite of his popularity surpassing that of Mickey's in real life. Chuck Jones used this relationship as the basis for the rivalry between Daffy Duck and Bugs Bunny in his cartoons. In most Disney theatrical cartoons, Mickey and Donald are shown as friends and have little to no rivalry (exceptions being The Band Concert, Magician Mickey and near the end of Symphony Hour, which were due to Donald's antagonistic schemes). However, by the time The Mickey Mouse Club aired on television, it was shown that Donald always wanted the spotlight.

In the TV special Mickey's 60th Birthday, Mickey is cursed by a sorcerer to become unnoticed, causing Donald Duck to be arrested for the apparent kidnapping of Mickey, but his charges are dismissed due to a lack of evidence. Walt Disney, in his Wonderful World of Color, would sometimes make reference to the rivalry. Walt, one time, had presented Donald with a gigantic birthday cake and commented how it was "even bigger than Mickey's", which pleased Donald. The clip was rebroadcast in November 1984 during a TV special honoring Donald's 50th birthday, with Dick Van Dyke substituting for Walt.

The rivalry between Mickey and Donald was shown in the 2001-2003 television series House of Mouse. It was shown that Donald wanted to be the club's founder and wanted to change the name from House of Mouse to House of Duck, which is obvious in the episodes "The Stolen Cartoons" and "Timon and Pumbaa". In the episode "Everybody Loves Mickey", Donald's jealousy is explored and even joins sides with Mortimer Mouse. However, Donald has a change of heart when Daisy reminds Donald how Mickey has always been there to support him. Since then, Donald accepted that Mickey was the founder and worked with Mickey as a partner to make the club profitable and successful.

=== Enemies ===
Donald has numerous enemies, who range from comical foil to nemesis: Chip 'n' Dale, Pete, Humphrey the Bear, Spike the Bee, Mountain Lion Louie, Bootle Beetle, Witch Hazel (in Trick or Treat), Aracuan Bird and Baby Shelby (in Mickey Mouse Works). During the Second World War, propaganda cartoons produced saw Donald set against Adolf Hitler and Nazi Germany. In the comics, he is often harassed or on the run from the Beagle Boys, Magica De Spell, Gladstone Gander and Mr. Jones.

== Origin ==
Voice performer Clarence Nash auditioned for Walt Disney Productions when he learned that Disney was looking for people to create animal sounds for his cartoons. Disney was particularly impressed with Nash's duck imitation and chose him to voice the new character. Disney came up with Donald's iconic attributes including his short temper and his sailor suit (based on ducks and sailors both being associated with water). While Dick Huemer and Art Babbit were the first to animate Donald, Dick Lundy is credited for developing him as a character.

On April 29, 1934, five days before The Wise Little Hen's first theatrical release, bandleader Raymond Paige performed the score to the cartoon on his California Melodies program for the Los Angeles AM radio station KHJ. The main vocals were performed by a trio, the Three Rhythm Kings. Clarence Nash and Florence Gill performed the character voices for this radio treatment, with Nash performing both Donald Duck and Peter Pig, making it the first time the public heard Nash's duck voice.

An apocryphal alternative story for how Donald was created came about from a claim that Disney was watching an exhibition cricket match between Australia and the New York West Indians and Australia's star batsman Don Bradman was out for a duck. Disney allegedly used this as inspiration for the character. However, the veracity of this has been doubted by modern historians.

== Animation ==
=== Early development ===
Donald Duck as he first appeared in The Wise Little Hen (1934)

Donald Duck's first film appearance was in the 1934 cartoon The Wise Little Hen, which was part of the Silly Symphonies series of theatrical cartoon shorts. The film's given release date of June 9 is officially recognized by the Walt Disney Company as Donald's birthday, though historian J.B. Kaufman, consultant of the Walt Disney Family Museum, discovered in recent years that The Wise Little Hen was first shown on May 3, 1934, at the Carthay Circle Theater for a benefit program, while its official debut was on June 7 at the Radio City Music Hall. Donald's appearance in the cartoon, as created by animator Dick Lundy, is similar to his modern look – the feather and beak colors are the same, as are the blue sailor shirt and hat – but his features are more elongated, his body plumper, his feet smaller, and his sclerae white. Donald's personality is not developed in the short, being presented as a generic anthropomorphic duck. Peter Pig was also introduced in the film, but never caught on as a character due to his overt resemblance to Porky Pig.

Burt Gillett brought Donald back in a 1934 Mickey Mouse cartoon, Orphans' Benefit. Donald is one of a number of characters who are giving performances in a benefit for Mickey's Orphans. Donald's act is to recite the poems "Mary Had a Little Lamb" and "Little Boy Blue", but every time he tries, the mischievous orphans heckle him, leading the duck to fly into a squawking fit of anger. This explosive personality would remain with Donald for decades to come.

Donald continued to be a hit with audiences. The character began appearing regularly in most Mickey Mouse cartoons. Cartoons from this period, such as the cartoon The Band Concert (1935) – in which Donald repeatedly disrupts the Mickey Mouse Orchestra's rendition of The William Tell Overture by playing "Turkey in the Straw" – are regularly noted by critics as exemplary films and classics of animation. Animator Ben Sharpsteen also created the classic Mickey, Donald, and Goofy comedy formula in 1935, with the cartoon Mickey's Service Station.

In 1936, Donald was redesigned to be a bit fuller, rounder, and cuter, beginning with the cartoon Moving Day. He also began starring in solo cartoons, the first of which was Ben Sharpsteen's 1937 cartoon, Don Donald. This short also introduced a love interest of Donald's, Donna Duck, who evolved into Daisy Duck. Donald's nephews, Huey, Dewey and Louie, would make their first animated appearance a year later in the 1938 film, Donald's Nephews, directed by Jack King (they had been earlier introduced in the Donald Duck comic strip by Al Taliaferro, see below). By 1938, most polls showed that Donald was more popular than Mickey Mouse.

=== Wartime ===
Donald worked in a Nazi factory during a nightmare in Der Fuehrer's Face (1943).

During World War II, Donald appeared in several animated propaganda films, including the 1943 Der Fuehrer's Face. In this cartoon, Donald plays a worker in an artillery factory in "Nutzi Land" (Nazi Germany). He struggles with long working hours, very small food rations, and having to salute every time he sees a picture of the Führer (Adolf Hitler). These pictures appear in many places, such as on the assembly line in which he is screwing in the detonators of various sizes of shells. In the end, he becomes little more than a small part in a faceless machine with no choice but to obey until he falls, suffering a nervous breakdown. Then Donald wakes up to find that his experience was, in fact, a dream. At the end of the short, Donald looks to the Statue of Liberty and the American flag with renewed appreciation. Der Fuehrer's Face won the 1942 Academy Award for Animated Short Film. Der Fuehrer's Face was also the first of two animated short films to be set during the War to win an Oscar, the other being the Tom and Jerry short film The Yankee Doodle Mouse.

Other shorts from this period include a six film mini-series that follows Donald's life in the U.S. Army from his drafting to his experiences in basic training under Sergeant Pete to his first actual mission as a commando having to sabotage a Japanese air base. Titles in the series include:

- Donald Gets Drafted (May 1, 1942)
- The Vanishing Private (September 25, 1942)
- Sky Trooper (November 8, 1942)
- Fall Out Fall In (April 23, 1943)
- The Old Army Game (November 5, 1943)
- Commando Duck (June 2, 1944)

Thanks in part to these films, Donald graced the nose artwork of virtually every type of World War II Allied combat aircraft, from the L-4 Grasshopper to the B-29 Superfortress.

Donald also appears as a mascot—such as in the United States Army Air Forces' 309th Fighter Squadron and the U.S. Coast Guard Auxiliary, which showed Donald as a fierce-looking pirate ready to defend the American coast from invaders. Donald also appeared as a mascot emblem for the 415th Fighter Squadron; 438th Fighter Squadron; 479th Bombardment Squadron; and 531st Bombardment Squadron. He also appeared as the mascot for the Fire Department at Marine Corps Air Station El Toro, as well as the Army Air Forces (now currently the United States Air Force) 319 Aircraft Maintenance Unit at Luke Air Force Base — where he is seen wearing an old-style pilot's uniform with a board with a nail in it in one hand, and a lightning bolt in the other hand. Donald's most famous appearance, however, was on the North American Aviation B-25B Mitchell medium bomber (S/N 40-2261) piloted by Lt. Ted W. Lawson of the 95th Bombardment Squadron, USAAF. The aircraft, named the "Ruptured Duck" and carrying a picture of Donald's face above a pair of crossed crutches, was one of sixteen B-25Bs which took off from the aircraft carrier USS Hornet to bomb Tokyo on April 18, 1942, during the Doolittle Raid. The mission was led by Lieutenant Colonel (later General) Jimmy Doolittle. Like most of the aircraft that participated in the mission, the Ruptured Duck was unable to reach its assigned landing field in China following the raid and ended up ditching off the coast near Shangchow, China. The Ruptured Duck's pilot survived, with the loss of a leg, and later wrote about the Doolittle Raid in the book, later to be the 1944 movie, Thirty Seconds Over Tokyo.

Bf 109E of Grupul 7 in 1942

Other countries' air force units also used Donald as a mascot, such as the Royal Romanian Air Force's Grupul 7 Vânătoare (7th Fighter Group). Depicted with his blue sailor shirt and sometimes wearing a Romanian pilot badge, Donald appeared on the fuselage of all the Group's fighters between 1941 and 1942. Some of the Group's pilots wore embroidered patches on their flight suits featuring him as well.

During World War II, Disney cartoons were not allowed to be imported into Occupied Europe owing to their propagandistic content. Since this lost Disney revenue, he decided to create a new audience for his films in South America. He decided to make a trip through various Latin American countries with his assistants, and use their experiences and impressions to create two feature-length animation films. The first was Saludos Amigos (1942), which consisted of four short segments, two of them with Donald Duck. In the first, he meets his parrot pal José Carioca. The second film was The Three Caballeros (1944), in which he meets his rooster friend Panchito.

Several decades after the war, because Donald was never officially separated from service in either his animated shorts or his comic strips, as part of Donald's 50th Birthday celebrations during the 25th Annual Torrance, California Armed Forces Day Parade, the U.S. Army retired Donald Duck from active duty as a "Buck Sergeant" (i.e. "Buck Sergeant Duck").

=== Post-war ===
Many of Donald's films made after the war recast the duck as the brunt of some other character's pestering. Donald is seen repeatedly attacked, harassed, and ridiculed by his nephews, by the chipmunks Chip 'n' Dale, or by other characters such as Humphrey the Bear, Spike the Bee, Bootle Beetle, the Aracuan Bird, Louie the Mountain Lion, or a colony of ants. In effect, much like Bugs Bunny cartoons from Warner Bros, the Disney artists had reversed the classic screwball scenario perfected by Walter Lantz and others in which the main character is the instigator of these harassing behaviors, rather than the butt of them.

The post-war Donald also starred in educational films, such as Donald in Mathmagic Land and How to Have an Accident at Work (both 1959), and made cameos in various Disney projects, such as The Reluctant Dragon (1941) and the Disneyland television show (1959). For this latter show, Donald's uncle Ludwig von Drake was created in 1961. Another uncle, Scrooge McDuck, made his first animated appearance in 1967, after decades as a comics-only character.

In Who Framed Roger Rabbit (1988), Donald has a piano duel scene with fellow cartoon duck character Daffy Duck, voiced by Mel Blanc, as a humorous reference to them being real life competitors. Donald has since appeared in several different television shows and (short) animated movies. He played roles in The Prince and the Pauper (1990) and made a cameo appearance in A Goofy Movie (1995).

Donald had a rather small part in the animated television series DuckTales. There, Donald joins the U.S. Navy and leaves his nephews Huey, Dewey, and Louie with their Uncle Scrooge, who then has to take care of them. Donald's role in the overall series was fairly limited, as he only ended up appearing in a handful of episodes when home on leave. Some of the stories in the series were loosely based on the comics by Carl Barks.

Donald made some cameo appearances in Bonkers, before getting his own television show Quack Pack. This series featured a modernized Duck family. Donald was no longer wearing his sailor suit and hat, but a Hawaiian shirt. Huey, Dewey, and Louie now are teenagers, with distinct clothing, voices, and personalities. Daisy Duck has lost her pink dress and bow and has a new haircut. No other family members, besides Ludwig von Drake, appear in Quack Pack, and all other Duckburg citizens are humans and not dogs.

Donald made a comeback as the star of the "Noah's Ark" segment of Fantasia 2000 (1999), as first mate to Noah. Donald musters the animals to the Ark and attempts to control them. He tragically believes that Daisy has been lost, while she believes the same of him, but they are reunited at the end. All of this is etc to Edward Elgar's Pomp and Circumstance Marches 1–4.

In an alternate opening for the Disney film Chicken Little (2005), Donald would have made a cameo appearance as "Ducky Lucky". This scene can be found on the Chicken Little DVD. Donald also played an important role in Mickey Mouse Works and House of Mouse. In the latter show, he is the co-owner of Mickey's nightclub. He is part of the ensemble cast of characters in the TV show Mickey Mouse Clubhouse as well. He also appears in the 2013 Mickey Mouse TV shorts for Disney Channel and its Disney+ successor, The Wondeful World of Mickey Mouse.

Donald also appears in the DuckTales reboot, in which he is a main character as opposed to his minor role in the original cartoon. The series depicts him as having once been Scrooge's partner in adventure along with his sister Della. However, ten years prior to the series' beginning, Della went missing, leading to Donald and Scrooge going their separate ways and not speaking to each other throughout that time. In the present, Donald reluctantly brings Della's sons and his legal charges, the triplets, to Scrooge's mansion so he can babysit them while Donald attends a job interview, though he still has not forgiven Scrooge for their past history. Donald is temporarily hired by Scrooge's rival Flintheart Glomgold and ends up at the city of Atlantis, where Scrooge has also brought the boys. After some initial conflict Scrooge offers to let them stay with him in his mansion. Donald owns a boat in the series, which is relocated to Scrooge's pool at the conclusion of the series premiere. Later in the series, it is revealed that Donald's anger is the result of a fear that no one can understand him, though with the help of an anger management counselor and while taking care of Huey, Dewey, Louie, he was able to channel it into protective instinct.

=== Voice actors ===
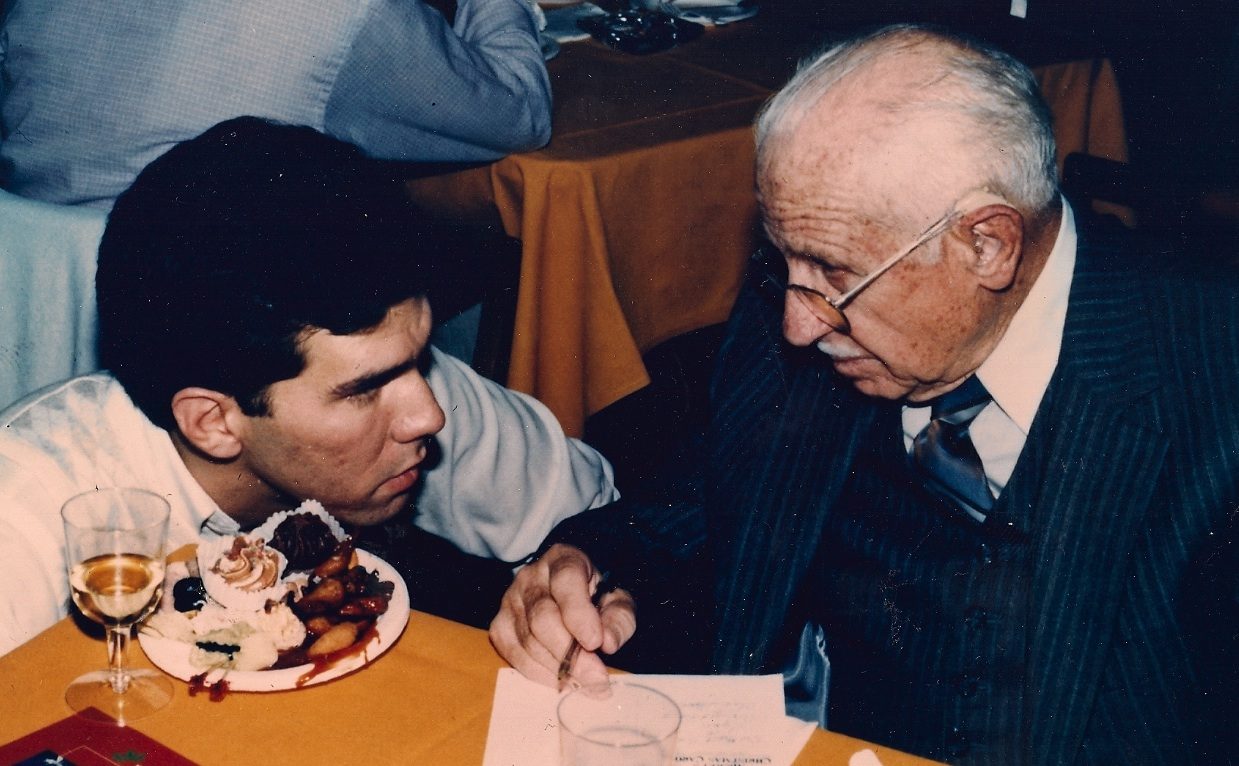
Tony Anselmo and Clarence Nash

Donald's first voice was performed by Clarence Nash, who voiced him for 50 years. As long as Nash was alive, no one else was permitted to do Donald's voice. Nash voiced Donald for the last time in Mickey's Christmas Carol (1983), making him the only character in the film to be voiced by his original voice actor. He continued to provide Donald's voice for commercials, promos, and other miscellaneous material until his death in 1985. Jack Wagner voiced Donald and other Disney characters in the 1980s, primarily for live entertainment offerings in the theme parks, Disney on Ice shows, and live-action clips for television.

Since Nash's death, Donald's voice has been performed by Disney animator Tony Anselmo, who was mentored by Nash for the role; the sole exception being the preschool series Mickey Mouse Mixed-Up Adventures, in which Donald was voiced by Daniel Ross, due to Anselmo being too busy providing the voice for the character in other Disney projects, namely DuckTales, Kingdom Hearts III and Legend of the Three Caballeros. Anselmo's first performance as Donald is heard in a 1986 D-TV special, D-TV Valentine on The Disney Channel, and in his first feature film, Who Framed Roger Rabbit (1988).

Walt Disney insisted on character consistency and integrity. Continuing that tradition, in 1988 Roy E. Disney created the department of Disney Character Voices to ensure continuation of character integrity, consistency, and quality in recording methods. Roy named one official voice for all Walt Disney legacy characters. Tony Anselmo was approved by Roy E. Disney as Disney's official voice of Donald Duck.

In the 2017 reboot of DuckTales, a young Donald was voiced by Russi Taylor in the episode "Last Christmas!", using the same voice she used for Huey, Dewey, and Louie since 1987. After her death in 2019, she was replaced by Cristina Vee in "The First Adventure!". Don Cheadle provided the "human" voice of the Barksian Modulator, swallowed by Donald to make his voice more intelligible in the episode "The Shadow War!". The same voice would return in the episode "Quack Pack!". In the episode "Louie's Eleven", Donald's singing voice was performed by an uncredited Dominic Lewis, the show's composer.

== Comics ==
While Donald's cartoons continue to be shown in the United States and around the world, his weekly and monthly comic books enjoy their highest profile in many European countries, especially Italy, Sweden, Denmark, Norway, Finland and Iceland, but also Germany, the Netherlands, and Greece. Most of them are produced and published by the Italian branch of the Walt Disney Company in Italy (Disney Italy) and by Egmont in Denmark, Norway, Finland and Sweden. In Germany, the comics are published by Ehapa which has since become part of the Egmont empire. Donald comics have also been produced in The Netherlands and France. Donald also has been appeared in Japanese comics published by Kodansha and Tokyopop.

According to the Inducks, a database about Disney comics worldwide, American, Italian and Danish stories have been reprinted in the following countries. In most of them, publications still continue: Australia, Austria, Argentina, Belgium, Brazil, Bulgaria, Canada, China, Colombia, Croatia, Czech Republic, Denmark (Faroe Islands), Egypt, Estonia, Finland, France, Germany, Greece, Guyana, Hungary, Iceland, India, Indonesia, Israel, Italy, Japan, Latvia, Lithuania, Mexico, the Netherlands, Norway, Philippines, Poland, Portugal, Romania, Russia, Saudi Arabia, Slovakia, Spain, Sweden, Thailand, Turkey, the United Kingdom, the United States, and the former Yugoslavia.

=== Early development ===
The character's first appearance in comic strip format was the 1934 Silly Symphony comic strip sequence, based on the short The Wise Little Hen. For the next few years, Donald made a few more appearances in Disney-themed strips, and by 1936 he had grown to be one of the main characters in the Silly Symphony strip. Ted Osborne was the primary writer of these strips, with Al Taliaferro as his artist. Osborne and Taliaferro also introduced several members of Donald's supporting cast, including his nephews Huey, Dewey, and Louie.

In 1937, the Italian publisher Mondadori created the first Donald Duck story intended specifically for comic books. The eighteen-page story, written by Federico Pedrocchi, is the first to feature Donald as an adventurer rather than simply a comedic character. Fleetway in England also began publishing comic book stories featuring the duck.

=== Developments under Taliaferro ===
A daily Donald Duck comic strip drawn by Taliaferro and written by Bob Karp began running in the United States on February 2, 1938; the Sunday strip began the following year. Taliaferro and Karp created an even larger cast of characters for Donald's world. He got a new St. Bernard named Bolivar, and his family grew to include cousin Gus Goose and grandmother Grandma Duck. Donald's new rival girlfriends were Donna and Daisy Duck. Taliaferro also gave Donald his very own automobile, a 1934 Belchfire Runabout, in a 1938 story, which is often nicknamed by Donald's "313" car plate in the comic incarnation of Donald's world.

=== Developments under Barks ===
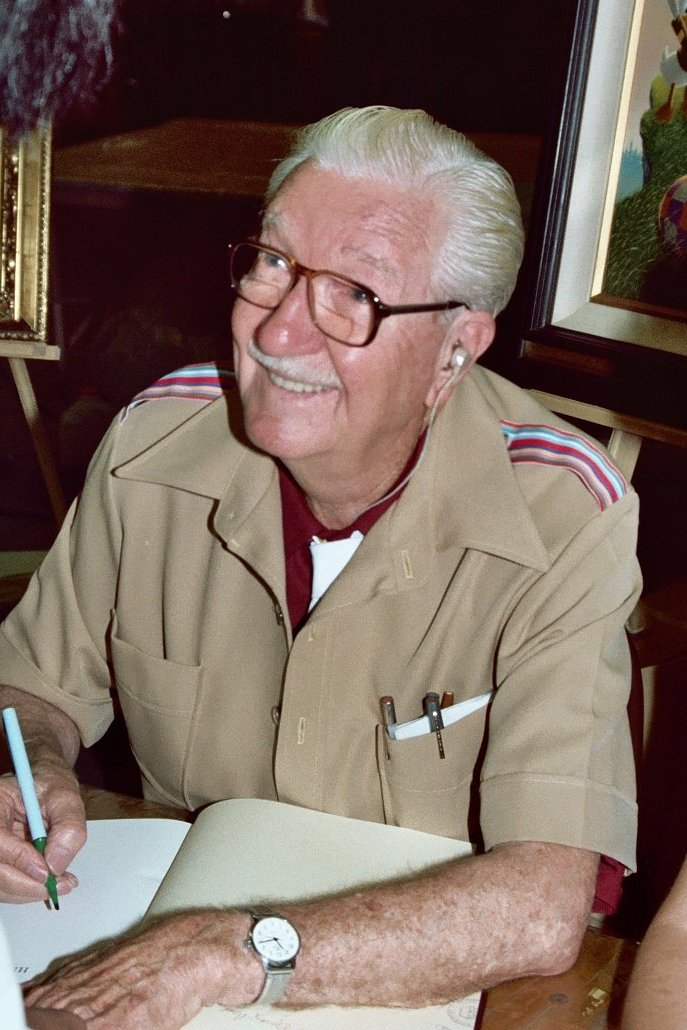
Carl Barks (1901–2000)

In 1942, Western Publishing began creating original comic book stories about Donald and other Disney characters. Bob Karp worked on the earliest of these, a story called "Donald Duck Finds Pirate Gold". The new publisher meant new illustrators, however, Carl Barks and Jack Hannah would later repeat the treasure hunting theme in many more stories.

Barks soon took over the major development of the duck as both writer and illustrator. Under his pen, Donald became more adventurous, less temperamental and more eloquent. Pete was the only other major character from the Mickey Mouse comic strip to feature in Barks' new Donald Duck universe.

Barks placed Donald in the city of Duckburg, creating a host of supporting players, including Neighbor Jones (1944), Uncle Scrooge McDuck (1947), Gladstone Gander (1948), the Beagle Boys (1951), Gyro Gearloose (1952), April, May and June (1953), Flintheart Glomgold (1956), Magica de Spell (1961), and John D. Rockerduck (1961). Many of Taliaferro's characters made the move to Barks' world as well, including Huey, Dewey, and Louie. Barks placed Donald in both domestic and adventure scenarios, and Uncle Scrooge became one of his favorite characters to pair up with Donald. Scrooge's profile increased, and by 1952, the character had a comic book of his own. At this point, Barks concentrated his major efforts on the Scrooge stories, and Donald's appearances became more focused on comedy or he was recast as Scrooge's helper, following his rich uncle around the globe.

=== Further developments ===
Dozens of writers continued to utilize Donald in their stories around the world.

For example, the Disney Studio artists, who made comics directly for the European market. Two of them, Dick Kinney (1917–1985) and Al Hubbard (1915–1984) created Donald's cousin Fethry Duck.

The American artists Vic Lockman and Tony Strobl (1915–1991), who were working directly for the American comic books, created Moby Duck. Strobl was one of the most productive Disney artists of all time and drew many stories which Barks wrote and sketched after his retirement. In the 1990s and early 2000s, these scripts were re-drawn in a style closer to Barks' own by Dutch artist Daan Jippes.

Italian publisher Mondadori created many of the stories that were published throughout Europe. They also introduced numerous new characters who are today well known in Europe. One example is Donald Duck's alter ego, a superhero called Paperinik in Italian (known as Duck Avenger in the US and Superduck in the UK), created in 1969 by Guido Martina (1906–1991) and Giovan Battista Carpi (1927–1999).

Giorgio Cavazzano and Carlo Chendi created Umperio Bogarto, a detective whose name is an obvious parody on Humphrey Bogart. They also created O.K Quack, an extraterrestrial Duck who landed on Earth in a spaceship in the shape of a coin. He, however, lost his spaceship and befriended Scrooge, and now is allowed to search through his money bin time after time, looking for his ship.

Romano Scarpa (1927–2005), a very important and influential Italian Disney artist, created Brigitta McBridge, a female Duck who is madly in love with Scrooge. Her affections are never answered by him, though, but she keeps trying. Scarpa also came up with Dickie Duck, the granddaughter of Glittering Goldie (Scrooge's possible love interest from his days in the Klondike) and Kildare Coot, a nephew of Grandma Duck.

Italian artist Corrado Mastantuono created Bum Bum Ghigno, a cynical, grumpy and not too good-looking Duck who teams up with Donald and Gyro a lot.

American artist William Van Horn also introduced a new character: Rumpus McFowl, an old and rather corpulent Duck with a giant appetite and laziness, who is first said to be a cousin of Scrooge. Only later, Scrooge reveals to his nephews Rumpus is actually his half-brother. Later, Rumpus also finds out.

Working for the Danish editor Egmont, artist Daniel Branca (1951–2005) and scriptwriters Paul Halas and Charlie Martin created Sonny Seagull, an orphan who befriends Huey, Dewey and Louie, and his rival, Mr. Phelps.

One of the most productive Duck artists used to be Victor Arriagada Rios, (1934–2012) better known under the name Vicar. He had his own studio where he and his assistants drew the stories sent in by Egmont. With writer and editors Stefan and Unn Printz-Påhlson, Vicar created the character Oona, a prehistoric duck princess who traveled to modern Duckburg by using Gyro's time machine. She stayed and is still seen in occasional modern stories.

The best known Duck artist of this time is American Don Rosa. He started doing Disney comics in 1987 for the American publisher Gladstone. He later worked briefly for the Dutch editors but moved to work directly for Egmont soon afterwards. His stories contain many direct references to stories by Carl Barks, and he also wrote and illustrated a 12-part series of stories about the life of Scrooge McDuck, which won him two Eisner Awards.

Other important artists who have worked with Donald are Freddy Milton and Daan Jippes, who made 18 ten-pagers which experts claim, were very difficult to separate from Barks' own work from the late 1940s.

Japanese artist Shiro Amano worked with Donald on the graphic novel Kingdom Hearts based on the Disney-Square Enix video game.

=== Nordic countries ===
Donald Duck is known in Nordic countries as Kalle Anka in Sweden, Anders And Co. in Denmark, Andrés Önd in Iceland, Donald Duck in Norway, and Aku Ankka in Finland. In the mid-1930s, Robert S. Hartman, a German who served as a representative of Walt Disney, visited Sweden to supervise the merchandise distribution of Sagokonst (The Art of Fables). Hartman found a studio called L'Ateljé Dekoratör, which produced illustrated cards that were published by Sagokonst. Since the Disney characters on the cards appeared to be exactly 'on-model', Hartman asked the studio to create a local version of the English-language Mickey Mouse Weekly.

In 1937 L'Ateljé Dekoratör began publishing Musse Pigg Tidningen (Mickey Mouse Magazine), which had high production values and spanned 23 issues; most of the magazine's content came from local producers, while some material consisted of reprints from Mickey Mouse Weekly. The comic anthology ended in 1938. Hartman helped Disney establish offices in all Nordic countries before he left Disney in 1941. Donald became the most successful of the Disney characters in the Nordic countries.

Kalle Anka & C:o, (Donald Duck & Co.) Donald's first dedicated Swedish anthology, started in September 1948. In 2001 the Finnish Post Office issued a stamp set to commemorate the 50th anniversary of Donald's presence in Finland. By 2005 around one out of every four Norwegians read the Norwegian edition Donald Duck & Co. per week, translating to around 1.3 million regular readers. During the same year, every week 434,000 Swedes read Kalle Anka & C:o. By 2005 in Finland the Donald Duck anthology Aku Ankka sold 270,000 copies per issue. Tim Pilcher and Brad Books, authors of The Essential Guide to World Comics, described the Donald anthologies as "the Scandinavian equivalent of the UK's Beano or Dandy, a comic that generations have grown up with, from grandparents to grandchildren".

Hannu Raittila, an author, says that Finnish people recognize an aspect of themselves in Donald; Raittila cites that Donald attempts to retrieve himself from "all manner of unexpected and unreasonable scrapes using only his wits and the slim resources he can put his hands on, all of which meshes nicely with the popular image of Finland as driftwood in the crosscurrents of world politics". Finnish voters placing protest votes typically write "Donald Duck" as the candidate. In Sweden voters often voted for Donald Duck or the Donald Duck Party as a nonexistent candidate until a 2006 change in voting laws, which prohibited voting for nonexistent candidates. In a twenty-year span, Donald won enough votes to be, in theory, Sweden's ninth-most popular political organization. In 1985, Donald received 291 votes in an election for the Parliament of Sweden.

By 1978, within Finland, there was a debate over the morality of Donald Duck. Matti Holopainen jokingly criticized Donald for living with Daisy while not being married to her, for not wearing trousers, and for, in the words of the Library Journal, being "too bourgeois". Some observers from Finland from the same time period supported Donald, referring to him as a "genuine proletarian ... forced to sell his labor at slave rates to make a living". The Library Journal said it was revealed that, since 1950, Donald had secretly been married to Daisy. An annual Christmas special in Norway, Denmark, Finland and Sweden is From All of Us to All of You, in Norway and Sweden with a title of Donald Duck and His Friends Celebrate Christmas. Segments include Ferdinand the Bull, a short with Chip 'n' Dale, a segment from Lady and the Tramp, a sneak preview of a coming Disney movie and concludes with Jiminy Cricket performing "When You Wish Upon a Star". To many people watching this special is a tradition as important as having a Christmas tree.

=== Germany ===
Donald Duck-themed comics sell an average of 250,000 copies each week in Germany, mostly published in the kids' weekly Micky Maus and the monthlies Donald Duck Special (for adults) and Lustiges Taschenbuch. The Wall Street Journal called Donald Duck "The Jerry Lewis of Germany", a reference to American star Jerry Lewis' popularity in France. Donald's dialogue in German comics tends to be more sophisticated and philosophical, he "quotes from German literature, speaks in grammatically complex sentences and is prone to philosophical musings, while the stories often take a more political tone than their American counterparts", features especially associated with Erika Fuchs's German translations of the comics created by The Good Duck Artist Carl Barks. Christian Pfeiler – former president of D.O.N.A.L.D., the German Organization for Non-commercial Followers of Pure Donaldism (German: Deutsche Organisation nichtkommerzieller Anhänger des lauteren Donaldismus) – says Donald is appreciated in Germany because "almost everyone can identify with him. He has strengths and weaknesses; he lacks polish but is also very cultured and well-read." It is through this everyman persona that Donald is able to voice philosophical truths about German society that appeal to both children and adults. Donald's writers and illustrators Carl Barks, Don Rosa and Ub Iwerks are well known in Germany and have their own fan clubs.

=== Italy ===
In Italy, new stories about Donald Duck (named Paolino Paperino) and Scrooge McDuck are hosted in the kids' weekly Topolino and the monthly Paperino. While Paperino is written by many authors, he still maintains several characteristics. He is mostly an everyman, but the fierce, harsh temper he has in the American comic appears to be diluted into a meek, weaker personality, prone to comical fits of rage that are mostly subdued by the realization of its impotence. His frustration at Gladstone's luck is comically enhanced: in the Italian comics, Donald is chronically unlucky, unable to do or get anything right, with Gladstone taking advantage of his superiority or taking genuine pity of his unlucky cousin and trying several plans to grant him some better luck, always failing.

Donald Duck as Paperinik, also known as Duck Avenger and Superduck outside Italy. Art by Marco Rota.

However, the constant search for an outlet to vent his frustration led the Italian rendition of Donald Duck to seek his catharsis in several ways: in the sixties, vexed by Scrooge's antics and Gladstone's luck, he reinvented himself as Paperinik, the Duck Avenger or Superduck as he came to be known outside Italy, an anti-hero at first, a self-assured, well-adjusted, brilliant hero in later stories, no longer bound by the self-doubt and the mockery Donald is constantly subjected. Duck Avenger is referred to the character Dorellik (parody of Diabolik) performed by Johnny Dorelli, Italian actor and crooner, in the Anglo-Italian movie Arriva Dorellik (How To Kill 400 Duponts). Further along the years, he fashioned for himself the additional identities of QQ7, a bumbling secret agent protecting Scrooge's riches and DoubleDuck, a more confident and suave secret agent, in the mold of James Bond, a more equilibrate mold of the heroic Duck Avenger and the tricky QQ7, often accompanied by the beautiful spy Kay K. Donald's "secret identies" are hosted in the main Topolino comics, but also in several themed comics, like the now-defunct Paperinik, PKNA, PK^2 and the current Paperinik AppGrade, the latter hosting reprints and new stories as well. Paperinik / Duck Avenger also appeared in the video games PK: Out of the Shadows, PK: Phantom Duck, and The Duckforce Rises.

Having several full lives to live does not hamper Donald's ability to live adventures on his own: he still lives adventures with his uncle Scrooge and his nephews (often acting as a reluctant bumbler, a ballast to the enthusiasm of his nephews and the wanderlust of his uncle), and he lived a star-crossed love story with a princess from another planet, Reginella. Despite Reginella leaving a deep trace in Donald's heart, he is still depicted as extremely faithful to Daisy, with a small hiccup deriving by Daisy Duck having a secret identity on her own (Paperinika), with Paperinik and Paperinika, both unaware of their secret identities, cultivating a permanent status of belligerent tension.

He also keeps a cheerful rivalry with his neighbour Bum Bum Ghigno, more a bumbler and a nuisance than he is, but still a good person at heart.

The Italian rendition of Donald Duck seldom, if ever, goes by his first name, having everyone, including his nephews, Daisy and Uncle Scrooge, address him as Paperino (his Italian surname).

He also appears in the Topolino comics depicting his childhood, called Paperino Paperotto (English: Donald Duckling), which were first produced in Italy in 1998. He lives in the fictional town, Quack Town with Grandma Duck and Billy Goat.

== Disney theme parks ==
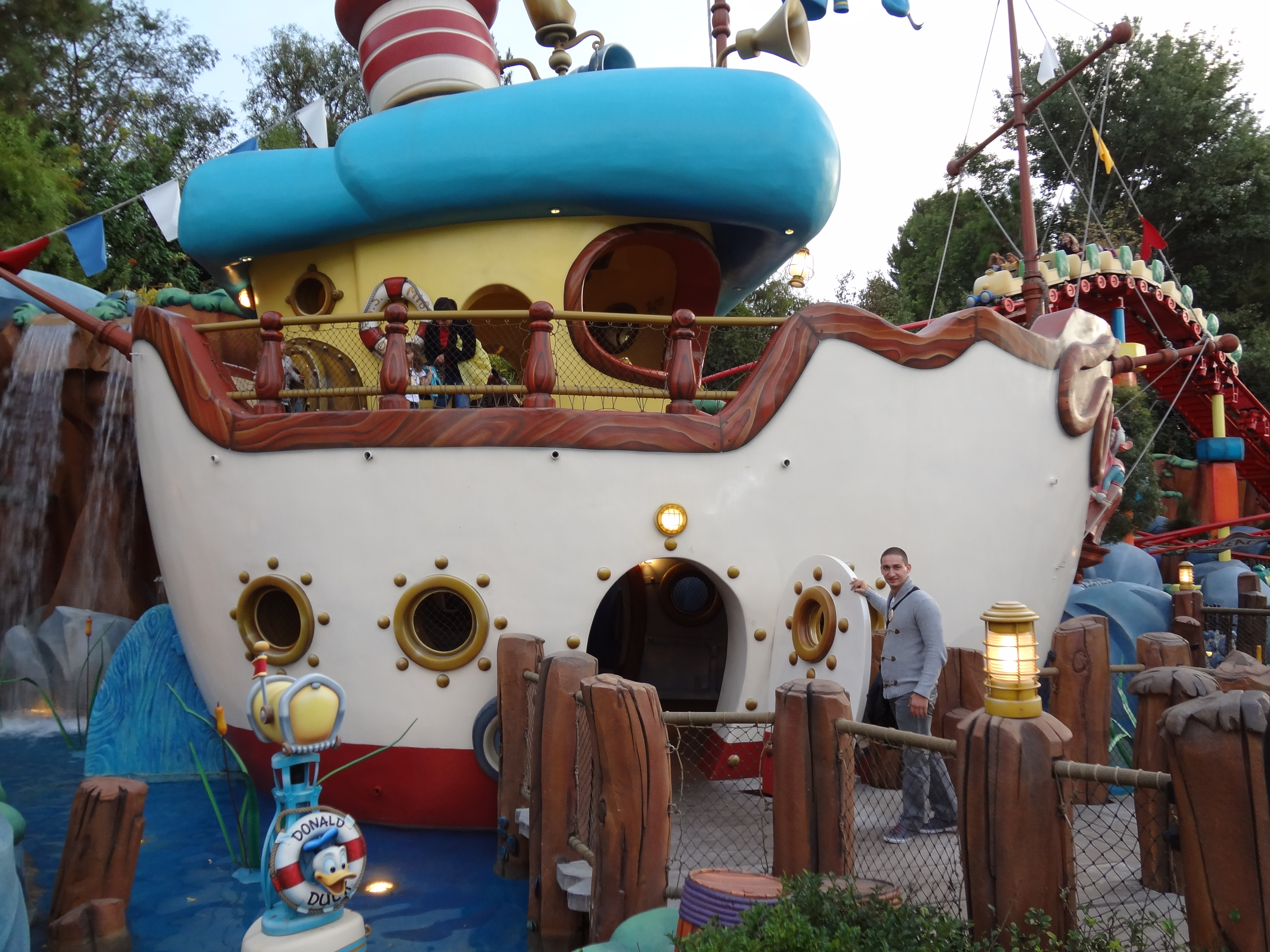
Donald's house boat at Mickey's Toontown, Disneyland

Donald Duck has played a major role in many Disney theme parks over the years. He has actually been seen in more attractions and shows at the parks than Mickey Mouse has. He has appeared over the years in such attractions as Animagique, Mickey Mouse Revue, Mickey's PhilharMagic, Disneyland: The First 50 Magical Years, Gran Fiesta Tour Starring the Three Caballeros and the updated version of "It's a Small World". He also is seen in the parks as a meet-and-greet character.

== Children's books ==
Donald has been a frequent character in children's books beginning in 1935. Most of these books were published by Whitman Publishing, later called Western Publishing, or one of its subsidiaries. The following is a list of children's books in which Donald is the central character. This does not include comic books or activity books such as coloring books. It also does not include the 1931 book The Adventures of Mickey Mouse, which features an entirely different character also named Donald Duck.

=== Whitman/Western books ===
- Walt Disney's Donald Duck (1935), first published appearance
- Donald Duck Story Book (1937)
- Donald Duck Has His Ups and Downs (1937)
- Donald's Lucky Day (1939), adaptation of the cartoon short of the same name
- Donald Duck and His Cat Troubles (1948)
- Bringing up the Boys (1948)
- Donald Duck's Kite (1949)
- Donald Duck and the Wishing Star (1952), a Cozy Corner book
- Donald Duck Goes to Disneyland (1955)
- Help Wanted (1955)
- Donald Duck and the Lost Mesa Ranch (1966)
- Donald Duck: Board Book (1969)

Better Little Books

- Donald Duck Gets Fed Up (1940)
- Donald Duck Sees Stars (1941)
- Off the Beam (1943)
- Headed for Trouble (1943)
- Donald Duck and Ghost Morgan's Treasure (1946), based on Donald Duck Finds Pirate Gold (1942)
- Donald Duck and the Green Serpent (1947), based on the comic The Terror of the River!! (1946)
- Donald Duck Lays Down the Law (1948)
- Donald Duck in Volcano Valley (1949)

Little Golden Books

- The Great Kite Maker (1949)
- Donald's Toy Train (1950), based on cartoon short Out of Scale
- Donald Duck's Adventure (1950), a Mickey Mouse Club book
- Donald Duck and Santa Claus (1952), a Mickey Mouse Club book
- Donald Duck and the Witch (1953)
- Donald Duck's Toy Sailboat (1954), based on the cartoon short Chips Ahoy
- Donald Duck's Christmas Tree (1954, 1991), based on cartoon short Toy Tinkers
- Donald Duck's Safety Book (1954)
- Donald Duck in Disneyland (1955)
- Donald Duck and the Mouseketeers (1956), a Mickey Mouse Club book
- Donald Duck and the Christmas Carol (1960)
- Donald Duck and the Witch Next Door (1971)
- Disneyland Parade with Donald Duck (1971)
- Donald Duck: Private Eye (1972)
- Donald Duck: Prize Driver (1974), a Mickey Mouse Club book
- America On Parade (1975)
- Donald Duck and the One Bear (1978), based on the fairy tale Goldilocks and the Three Bears
- Instant Millionaire (1978)
- Where's Grandma? (1983), a Golden Stiff It book
- Donald Duck and the Big Dog (1986)
- Some Ducks Have All the Luck (1987)

Tell-a-Tale Books

- Donald Duck's Lucky Day (1951)
- Full Speed Ahead (1953)
- Donald Duck and the New Birdhouse (1956)
- Donald Duck in Frontierland (1957)
- Donald Duck and the Super-Sticky Secret (1985)
- Tom Sawyer's Island (1985)

Little Big Books

- The Fabulous Diamond Fountain (1967)
- Luck of the Ducks (1969)
- Donald Duck in Volcano Valley (1973), reprinting of 1949 Better Little Book
- The Lost Jungle City (1975)

=== Grosset and Dunlap books ===
- Donald Duck (1936)

=== D.C. Heath and Co. books ===
- Donald Duck and His Friends (1939), a Disney Health book
- Donald Duck and His Nephews (1939), a Disney Health book

=== Random House books ===
- Donald Duck and the Magic Stick (1974)
- Donald Duck: Mountain Climber (1978)
- Donald Duck's Big Surprise (1982)
- Donald Duck Buys a House (1982)

=== Walt Disney Productions books ===
- The Donald Duck Book (1978), a Golden Shape book

=== Grolier/Scholastic books ===
- Baby Donald's Day at the Beach (2001)
- Baby Donald Makes a Snowfriend (2005)

== Beyond Disney ==
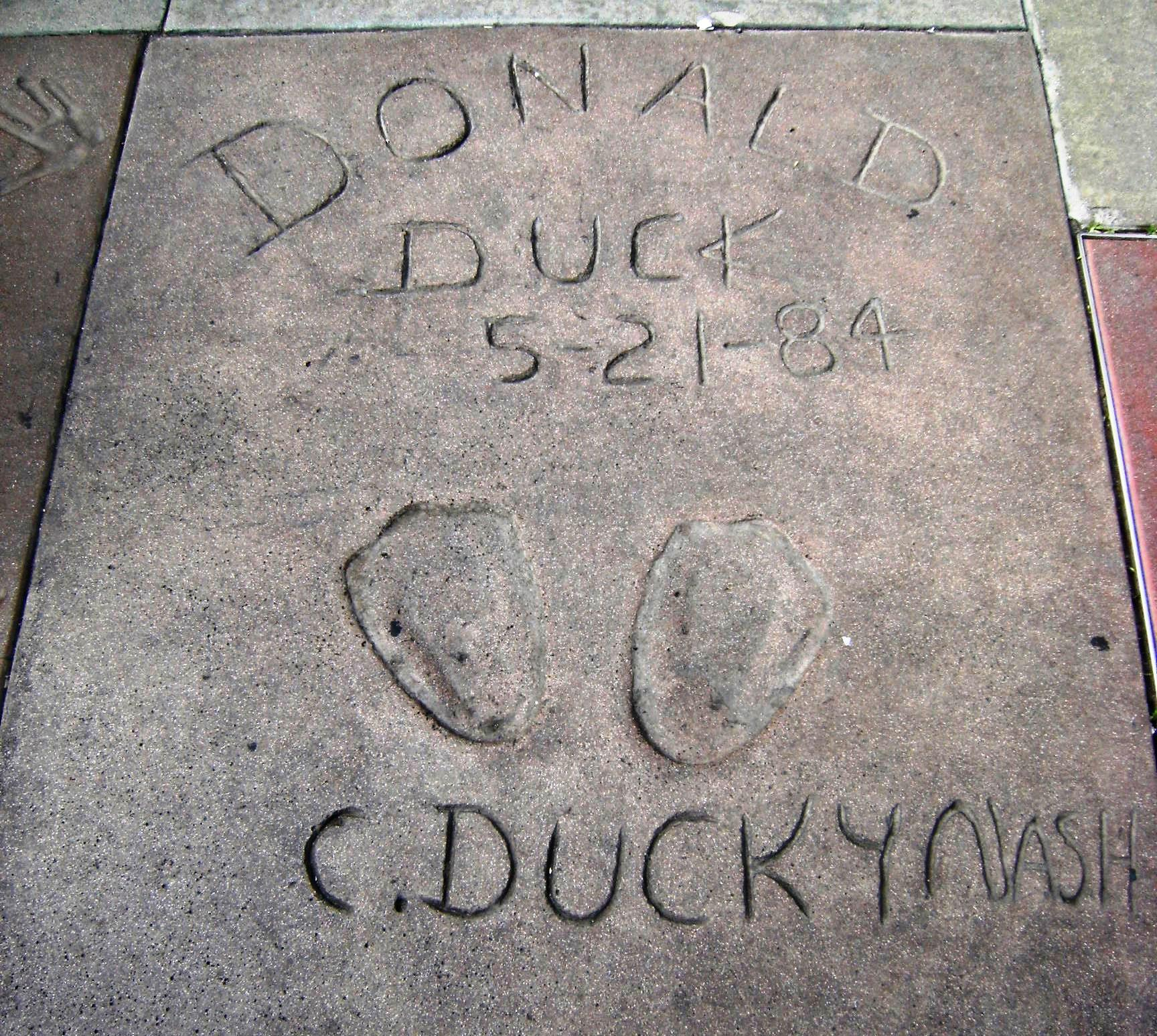
Donald's footprints at the Grauman's Chinese Theatre in Hollywood. The prints were made during the celebration of Donald's 50th birthday.

=== Songs ===
Donald was one of the few celebrities mentioned in the original version of the song Hooray for Hollywood, which was first featured in the 1937 film Hollywood Hotel, released only three years after Donald's first appearance. While later versions of the song would change lyrics, the line mentioning Donald was always kept.

Donald Duck is referred to in the song "The Village Green Preservation Society" by The Kinks: "We are the Village Green Preservation Society/ God save Donald Duck, vaudeville, and variety..." The reference is ironical, as the singer is lamenting the disappearance of perceived traditional English cultural artifacts.

During the late 1970s, Donald had his first and only disco song named "Macho Duck", available as part of the Mickey Mouse Disco children's album.

Italian power metal band Trick or Treat have a song called "Like Donald Duck" in their debut album Evil Needs Candy Too (2006).

=== As a mascot ===
Donald is the only significant film and television cartoon character to appear as a mascot for a major American university: a licensing agreement between Disney and the University of Oregon allows the school's sports teams to use Donald's image as its "Fighting Duck" mascot. In 1984, Donald Duck was named an honorary alumnus of the University of Oregon during his 50th birthday celebration. During a visit to the Eugene Airport, 3,000 to 4,000 fans gathered for the presentation of an academic cap and gown to Donald. Thousands of area residents signed a congratulatory scroll for Donald, and that document is now part of Disney's corporate archives.

In the 1940s, Donald was adopted as the mascot of Brazilian sports club Botafogo after Argentinean cartoonist Lorenzo Mollas, who was working in Brazil at the time, drew him with the club's soccer uniform. Mollas chose Donald because he complains and fights for his rights, like the club's managers at those years, and also because, being a duck, he does not lose his elegance while moving in the water (an allusion to rowing). He was eventually replaced so that the club would not have to pay royalties to Disney (Botafogo's current official mascot is Manequinho, a boy who represents the Manneken Pis statue in front of the club's head office), but has since retained the status of unofficial mascot. Although Donald's military service during his wartime cartoons has mostly been in the U.S. Army (and to a lesser extent in the U.S. Navy in DuckTales), Walt Disney authorized Donald to be used as a mascot for the U.S. Coast Guard. The Coast Guard image shows a fierce-looking Donald dressed in a pirate's outfit, appearing vigilant against any potential threats to the coastal regions in the United States. This image is often used on Coast Guard bases and Coast Guard cutters.

=== Cameos ===
Donald's fame has led Disney to license the character for a number of video games, such as the Kingdom Hearts series, where Donald is the court magician of Disney Castle and an ally of Sora. He is voiced by Tony Anselmo in the English version and Kōichi Yamadera in the Japanese version.

Donald Duck was temporarily listed as a "hired" employee in the database of the United States Department of Housing and Urban Development as late as 1978. Given a $99,999 salary – more than double the $47,500 take federal civil servants were legally limited to be paid at the time – the name was unchallenged by a computer intended to catch government payroll fraud. Picked as one of thirty fictitious names by the Government Accounting Office, the use of it was a test to see if the payroll system of the HUD could be manipulated to defraud the government.

Donald's name and image are used on numerous commercial products, one example being Donald Duck brand orange juice, introduced by Citrus World in 1940.

Donald Duck makes a cameo appearance in the cartoon sequence in 200 Motels (1971).

Donald Duck is a constant source of irritation for the eponymous hero of Donald Duk (1991), a coming-of-age novel by Frank Chin set in San Francisco's Chinatown.

Asteroid 12410 was named after Donald Duck.

=== Parodies ===
In the 1950s, an early Mad Magazine parody of Mickey Mouse (called "Mickey Rodent", written by "Walt Dizzy") featured "Darnold Duck", whose quacky voice had to be "translated" for the readers, and who was shamed into finally wearing pants.

Donald Duck's head and neck, wearing a radio headset and wrapped in earphone wires with an expression of pain on his face and with crossed crutches below, was the nose art on Lieutenant Ted W. Lawson's B-25 Mitchell bomber, the Ruptured Duck, on the famous Doolittle Raid on Tokyo in 1942.

In the 2016 US presidential election, according to Donna Brazile, DNC chair, who quotes Charlie Baker, the use of a protester in a Donald Duck costume was approved by Hillary Clinton's campaign to bring attention to Donald Trump's "ducking the release of his taxes".

=== Legal suits ===
In Sweden, a comic book artist named Charlie Christensen got into a legal dispute with Disney when his creation Arne Anka looked similar to Donald Duck (albeit Arne is a pessimistic drunkard). However, Charlie made a mockery of the legal action and staged a fake death for his character, which then had plastic surgery performed and reappeared as Arne X with a more corvine beak. He later purchased a strap-on duck beak from a novelty gift shop, pointing out that "If Disney is planning to give me any legal action; all I have to do is remove my fake beak".

In 1991, the Disney Corporation sued Israeli caricaturist Dudu Geva for copyright infringement, claiming his character "Donald Dach" in the story "Moby Duck" was a rip-off of Donald. The Courts found in their favor and forced Geva to pay for the legal expenses and remove his book from the shelves. More mildly, the character Howard the Duck's original design was modified to include pants allegedly due to pressure from Disney.

=== Hollywood ===
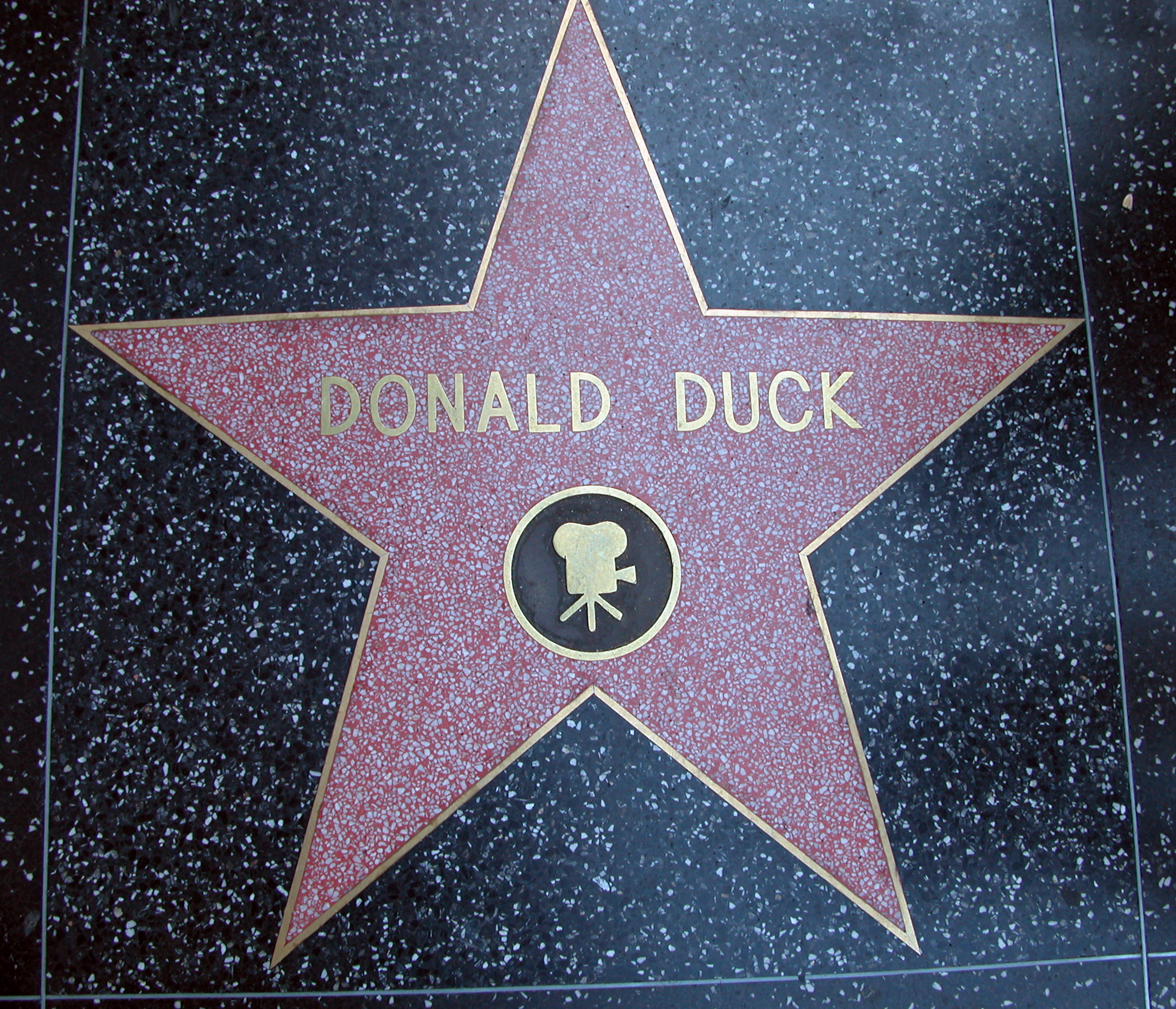
Donald Duck's Star on Hollywood Walk of Fame

In 2005, Donald received his own star on the Hollywood Walk of Fame at 6840 Hollywood Blvd joining other fictional characters such as Mickey Mouse, Bugs Bunny, Woody Woodpecker, The Simpsons, Winnie the Pooh, Kermit the Frog, Big Bird, Godzilla and Snow White.

== Appearances ==
=== Selected short films ===
- The Wise Little Hen (1934) – Silly Symphony short
- Orphan's Benefit (1934) – Mickey Mouse short
- The Band Concert (1935) – Mickey Mouse short
- Donald and Pluto (1936) – Mickey Mouse short
- Don Donald (1937) – Donald Duck short (Note: Originally released as a Mickey Mouse short.)
- Clock Cleaners (1937) – Mickey Mouse short
- Modern Inventions (1937) – Donald Duck short
- Donald's Ostrich (1937) – Donald Duck short
- Donald's Better Self (1938) – Donald Duck short
- Donald's Nephews (1938) – Donald Duck short
- Good Scouts (1938) – Donald Duck short
- Donald's Penguin (1939) – Donald Duck short
- The Autograph Hound (1939) – Mickey Mouse short
- Mr. Duck Steps Out (1940) – Donald Duck short
- Window Cleaners (1940) – Donald Duck short
- Truant Officer Donald (1941) – Donald Duck short
- The New Spirit (1942) – Donald Duck short
- Donald's Snow Fight (1942) – Donald Duck short
- Bellboy Donald (1942) – Donald Duck short
- Donald Gets Drafted (1942) – Donald Duck short
- Der Fuehrer's Face (1943) – Donald Duck short
- The Clock Watcher (1945) – Donald Duck short
- Donald's Crime (1945) – Donald Duck short
- Chip an' Dale (1947) – Donald Duck short
- Straight Shooters (1947) – Donald Duck short
- Inferior Decorator (1948) – Donald Duck short
- Slide, Donald, Slide (1949) – Donald Duck short
- Tea for Two Hundred (1948) – Donald Duck short
- Toy Tinkers (1949) – Donald Duck short
- Bee at the Beach (1950) – Donald Duck short
- Bee on Guard (1951) – Donald Duck short
- Let's Stick Together (1952) – Donald Duck short
- Rugged Bear (1953) – Donald Duck short
- Grand Canyonscope (1954) – Donald Duck short
- No Hunting (1955) – Donald Duck short
- Donald in Mathmagic Land (1959) – educational featurette
- Mickey's Christmas Carol (1983) – Mickey Mouse featurette
- The Prince and the Pauper (1990) – Mickey Mouse featurette

=== Feature-length films ===
- The Reluctant Dragon (1941)
- Saludos Amigos (1942)
- The Three Caballeros (1944)
- Fun and Fancy Free (1947)
- Melody Time (1948)
- Who Framed Roger Rabbit (1988) – Cameo
- A Goofy Movie (1995) – Cameo
- Mickey's Once Upon a Christmas (1999) DVD
- Fantasia 2000 (1999)
- Mickey's Magical Christmas: Snowed in at the House of Mouse (2001) DVD
- Mickey's House of Villains (2002) DVD
- The Lion King 1½ (2004) DVD – Silhouetted cameo
- Mickey's Twice Upon a Christmas (2004) DVD
- Mickey, Donald, Goofy: The Three Musketeers (2004) DVD

=== Television series ===
- Disney anthology television series (1954-1968)
  - 25 episodes (many of which are compilations of earlier shorts)
- Donald Duck's 50th Birthday (1984)
- DuckTales (1987, as recurring character)
- Mickey's 60th Birthday (1988)
- Donald Duck Presents (compilation of earlier shorts)
- Donald's Quack Attack (compilation of earlier shorts)
- Bonkers (1993, episode "Going Bonkers")
- Quack Pack (1996–1997)
- Mickey Mouse Works (1999–2000)
- House of Mouse (2001–2003)
- Mickey Mouse Clubhouse (2006–2016)
- Mickey Mouse (2013–2019)
- Mickey and the Roadster Racers/Mickey Mouse Mixed-Up Adventures (2017–2021)
- DuckTales (2017–2021)
- Legend of the Three Caballeros (2018)
- Mickey Go Local (2019)
- The Wonderful World of Mickey Mouse (2020–2023)
- Mickey Mouse Funhouse (2021–2025)
- Mickey Mouse Clubhouse+ (2025–present)

=== Video games ===
- Mickey Mouse Club House
- Donald Duck's Speedboat (cancelled) (1983)
- Donald Duck's Playground (1984)
- Donald's Alphabet Chase (1988)
- Donald The Hero (1988)
- The Lucky Dime Caper Starring Donald Duck (1991)
- Quackshot (1991)
- World of Illusion Starring Mickey Mouse and Donald Duck (1992)
- Deep Duck Trouble Starring Donald Duck (1993)
- Donald Duck no Mahō no Bōshi (1995)
- Disney's Magical Quest 3 starring Mickey & Donald (1995)
- Donald in Maui Mallard (1995)
- Donald Duck: Goin' Quackers (2000)
- Mickey's Speedway USA (2000)
- Kingdom Hearts (2002)
- Disney Golf (2002)
- Disney's PK: Out of the Shadows (2002)
- Kingdom Hearts Final Mix (2002)
- Toontown Online (2003)
- Kingdom Hearts: Chain of Memories (2004)
- Kingdom Hearts II (2005)
- Donald Duck Quest (2006)
- Kingdom Hearts II Final Mix (2007)
- Kingdom Hearts Re:Chain of Memories (2007)
- Duckburg P.D.: Donald on Duty (2007)
- Donald Duck Quest Deluxe (2007)
- Disney Think Fast (2008)
- Donald Duck Chaos of the Road (2008)
- Phantom Duck (2008)
- Kingdom Hearts coded (2008–2010)
- Kingdom Hearts 358/2 Days (2009)
- Kingdom Hearts Birth by Sleep (2010)
- Kingdom Hearts Re:coded (2010)
- Epic Mickey (2010)
- Kingdom Hearts 3D: Dream Drop Distance (2012)
- Epic Mickey 2: The Power of Two (2012)
- Disney Infinity 2.0 (2014)
- Disney Magic Kingdoms (2016)
- Kingdom Hearts III (2019)
- Kingdom Hearts: Melody of Memory (2020)
- Disney Mirrorverse (2022)
- Disney Illusion Island (2023)
- Disney Speedstorm (2023)
- Disney Dreamlight Valley (2023)
- Kingdom Hearts IV (2027)

== Notable illustrators ==
- Carl Barks
- Luciano Bottaro
- Daniel Branca
- Giovan Battista Carpi
- Giorgio Cavazzano
- Mau Heymans
- William Van Horn
- Daan Jippes
- Arild Midthun
- Don Rosa
- Marco Rota
- Romano Scarpa
- Tony Strobl
- Al Taliaferro
- Vicar
- Tetsuya Nomura
- Shiro Amano
- Kari Korhonen

== See also ==
- Walt Disney's World War II propaganda production
- How to Read Donald Duck

== Sources ==
- Content in this article was copied from Donald Duck at The Disney Wiki, which is licensed under the Creative Commons Attribution-Share Alike 3.0 (Unported) (CC-BY-SA 3.0) license.
