= Donald Duck (orange juice) =

American brand of frozen and refrigerated orange juice

- Type: Orange juice
- Manufacturer: Florida's Natural Growers
- Origin: United States
- Introduced: 1940

Donald Duck is an American brand of frozen and refrigerated orange juice that is owned by the Florida's Natural Growers agricultural cooperative, which was known as Citrus World from 1969 to 1998, and before that as the Florida Citrus Canners Cooperative. The brand was introduced in 1940 and is the cooperative's oldest brand. Donald Duck, one of Walt Disney's cartoon and comic book characters, is the mascot for the brand. He appears on the packaging and marketing, and in its advertising. For many years Donald Duck also appeared on the juice plant's water storage tank in Lake Wales, until 1998, when the cooperative decided to remove the Donald Duck logo as part of its name change and rebranding.

== Legal issues ==
In 1987 the brand was the subject of a lawsuit between Citrus World and its rival Tropicana Products, which alleged that the Donald Duck "Fresh 'N Natural" brand was being marketed deceptively as fresh squeezed juice when it was actually made from concentrate.
