= Aku Ankka =

Comics magazine in Finland

- The first issue of Aku Ankka, December 1951
- Categories: Comics
- Frequency: Weekly
- Circulation: 110,000 (2020)
- Publisher: Sanoma Magazines
- First issue: 1 December 1951; 73 years ago
- Company: Sanoma
- Country: Finland
- Based in: Helsinki
- Language: Finnish
- Website: www.akuankka.fi
- ISSN: 0355-2101

Aku Ankka (Finnish name of Donald Duck) is a Finnish weekly Disney comic book published by Sanoma Magazines since 1951.

== History and profile ==
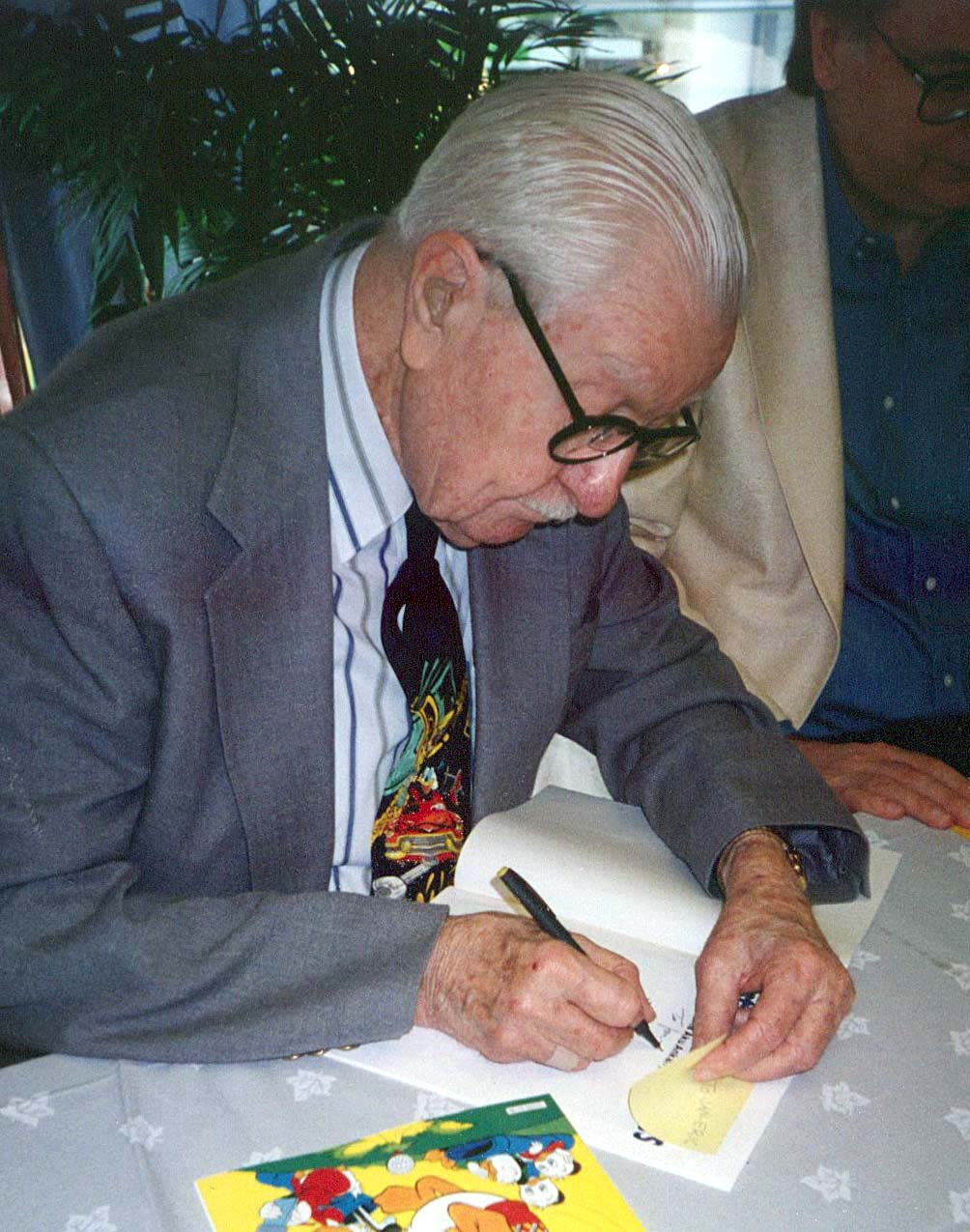
Carl Barks signing autographs in Finland 1994.

The first issue of Aku Ankka ja kumppanit (Donald Duck & Co.) was published on 5 December 1951 and sold 34,017 copies. The first issue, with a special Christmas theme, and the Snow White story published later in the 1950s are very prized collector's items and can fetch a price of several thousand euros on the collector market. The magazine was published monthly until 1956, twice a month between 1956 and 1960, and every Wednesday since 1961. The magazine's name was shortened to Aku Ankka in early 1955. Aku Ankka is published by Sanoma Media (formerly Sanoma Magazines), which is part of Sanoma.

Despite being part of a multinational franchise and despite most stories being translations into Finnish of stories first published abroad, Aku Ankka has become a cultural icon in Finland. This is largely due to the magazine's colourful and innovative use of the Finnish language. In 2001, in recognition of its work for the Finnish language, the editorial team was given the Kielihelmi award by the Finnish language department of the University of Helsinki.

The comics are also known for their use of Finnish language spoofs of famous people or groups. Examples include Arnoltti Kvartsinikkari for Arnold Schwarzenegger, Alfred Hiisikukko for Alfred Hitchcock and Brutallica for Metallica.

=== Alleged bans ===
There is a popular urban legend that Donald Duck was once banned in Finland for not wearing pants. This myth was sparked by an incident in 1977, when Helsinki councilman Matti Holopainen proposed discontinuing the use of city funds to subscribe to Aku Ankka comics for youth centers, due to the city's financial difficulties. The following year, when Holopainen was running for a parliament seat, his opponent, called him "the man who banned Donald Duck from Helsinki" and Holopainen lost the election. National Coalition Party politician Ben Zyskowicz called Holopainen's decision "an accident at work".

A similar incident had taken place a few years earlier in Kemi, and international reports exaggerated the situation in claims that the character's attire and his extramarital relationship with Daisy Duck were the causes of the local ban.

== Circulation ==
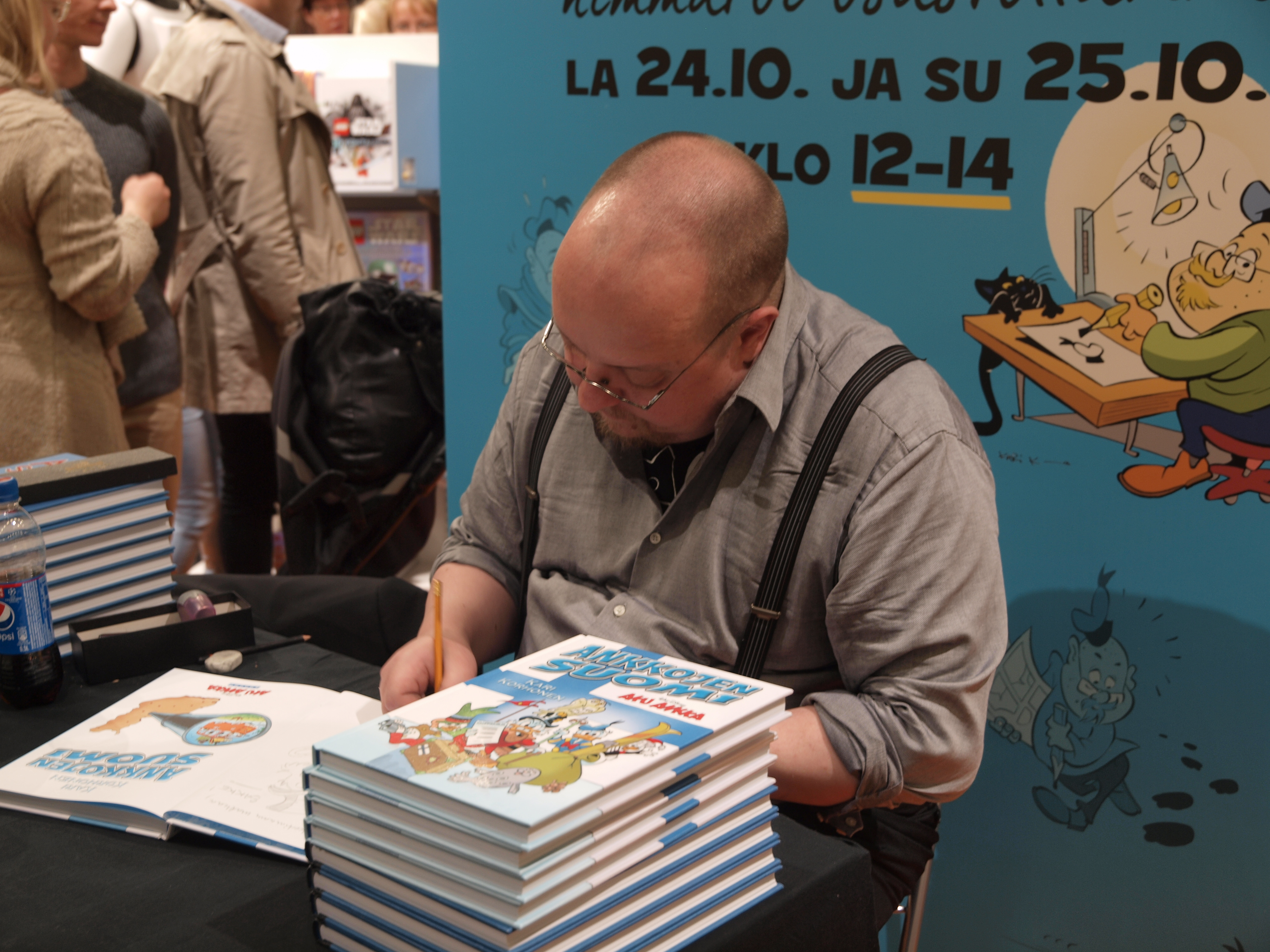
Kari Korhonen, Finland's most famous Donald Duck comics artist and writer, signing one of his comic books at the Helsinki Book Fair in 2015

Aku Ankka is one of the most popular weekly publications in Finland as well as the world's largest edition per capita of a Donald Duck magazine.

It had a circulation of 320,500 in 2006, 324,000 in 2007, and 306,555 in 2010. Its circulation of 282,794 in 2012 made it the third most popular magazine in Finland. When 260,455 copies were sold in 2013, it became the best-selling Finnish magazine. In 2020, circulation had dropped down to 110,000.

The Aku Ankka comic is now more popular in Finland than in the country of its origin, the United States (where Disney is better known for its cartoons and films than comics). The US Donald Duck cartoonist Don Rosa is exceptionally popular in Finland, and he has acknowledged this by creating The Quest for Kalevala, a Donald Duck story specifically set in Finland.

== See also ==
- List of magazines in Finland
- Kalle Anka & C:o
