= MM Mickey Mouse Mystery Magazine =

Magazine

MM – Mickey Mouse Mystery Magazine
- MM #0: "Anderville"; Art by Marco Ghiglione

Publication information
- Publisher: Disney Italy
- Schedule: Monthly
- Format: Comic book
- Genre: Crime fiction
- Publication date: May 1999 – March 2001
- No. of issues: 12
- Main character: Mickey Mouse

Creative team
- Created by: Tito Faraci

MM – Mickey Mouse Mystery Magazine is an Italian monthly comic, published by Disney Italy from May 1999 to March 2001, about Mickey Mouse and his investigation in the city of Anderville.

== Overview ==
The series, a noir story starring Mickey Mouse as the main character and is composed of twelve parts. It is often called MM or MMMM and it is set in Anderville, a chaotic metropolis, modelled on the city of New York City. Anderville is a deceiving city, full of criminals. In this new setting, Mickey Mouse has a hard life, because he has no friends and because the authors wanted to break traditional cliché of his adventures in Mouseton, featured in Italian comic Topolino. Villains are different from Black Pete and even from Phantom Blot, often unsuspected, and even friends act in a rude way toward Mickey Mouse, who often feels disoriented in the big city. These stories were directed to a more adult reader, trying to bring to a new life the "old style Mickey Mouse" of the 1930s and 1940s stories, written and illustrated by Floyd Gottfredson.

Mickey Mouse leaves Mouseton for Anderville, being involved in the case of his missing young friend Sonny Mitchell. To prove his innocence, being mistaken for a criminal, both by Anderville villains and police inspector Jan Clayton, he faces some dangerous situations, running the risk of being killed. He becomes friends with Little Ceaser, a well-respected, and somewhat rude, bartender, and with his friendly customers. He eventually proves his innocence but he is forced to stay in Anderville, waiting for furthermore investigations. He finds out that his friend left him an investigation agency: Mickey Mouse becomes a detective and gets involved in very dangerous events, which led him to act in a more violent way than the usual Mickey Mouse.

The first issue of the series was written by Tito Faraci and illustrated by Giorgio Cavazzano. They created Anderville, through many sketches and decided on a specific range of colors to use for the stories, preferring the dark and cold tones to the light and warm ones. MM demonstrated the talent of Francesco Artibani and Tito Faraci, main writers of the series, and was a showcase for the talent of some young, at the time, drawers: Silvio Camboni, Corrado Mastantuono, Paolo Mottura, Marco Palazzi, Alessandro Perina, Claudio Sciarrone, Stefano Turconi, Silvia Ziche and Giuseppe Zironi.

There were also two side stories: one featuring the weird journalist Chester Soup, a comical one, and one called Anderville Confidential.

== Main characters ==
- Mickey Mouse
- Sonny Mitchell
- Patty Ballestreros
- Jan Clayton
- Little Caesar

== Issues ==
The series was originally published in Italian from May 1999 to March 2001. The entire series has been translated to German, Dutch, Greek and European Portuguese, and is currently published in Finnish and Brazilian Portuguese. The first story has also been translated to Spanish, Swedish and French. No English translation has been published so far.

Issue #	Publication date	Title	Writer	Penciller
MM #0	May 1999	Anderville	Tito Faraci	Giorgio Cavazzano
MM #1	July 1999	The Link	Tito Faraci	Alessandro Perina
MM #2	September 1999	Estrelita	Francesco Artibani	Giuseppe Zironi
MM #3	November 1999	Lost & Found	Tito Faraci	Claudio Sciarrone
MM #4	January 2000	Mousetrap	Francesco Artibani	Giuseppe Zironi
MM #5	March 2000	Firestorm	Tito Faraci	Alessandro Perina
MM #6	May 2000	Calypso	Francesco Artibani	Claudio Sciarrone
MM #7	July 2000	Black Mask	Tito Faraci	Corrado Mastantuono
MM #8	September 2000	Victoria	Augusto Macchetto	Stefano Turconi
MM #9	November 2000	Run Run Run	Riccardo Secchi	Paolo Mottura
MM #10	January 2001	The Dark Side	Tito Faraci	Marco Palazzi
MM #11	March 2001	Small World	Francesco Artibani	Silvio Camboni

== Plot summaries ==
1. MM #0 Anderville – Mickey Mouse leaves Mouseton to Anderville, being involved in the case of the missing of his old friend, Sonny Mitchell.
2. MM #1 The Link
3. MM #2 Estrelita
4. MM #3 Lost & Found
5. MM #4 Mousetrap
6. MM #5 Firestorm
7. MM #6 Calypso
8. MM #7 Black Mask – Mickey is now free to return to Mouseton. He will leave Anderville aboard a new train, in its inaugural trip. The train, named Black Mask is controlled by an A.I. During the trip, a killer is sent to kill Mickey. When she misses her target, the blast of his weapon causes the A.I. to malfunction and Black Mask becomes unstoppable. With a surprising idea Mickey saves the train and finds the killer.
9. MM #8 Victoria
10. MM #9 Run Run Run
11. MM #10 The Dark Side – A parallel police acts in the shadow against villains in Anderville.
12. MM #11 Small World – A pyromaniac is coming from the past to menace the old members of a firefighter squad.
