= Giorgio Cavazzano =

Italian cartoonist

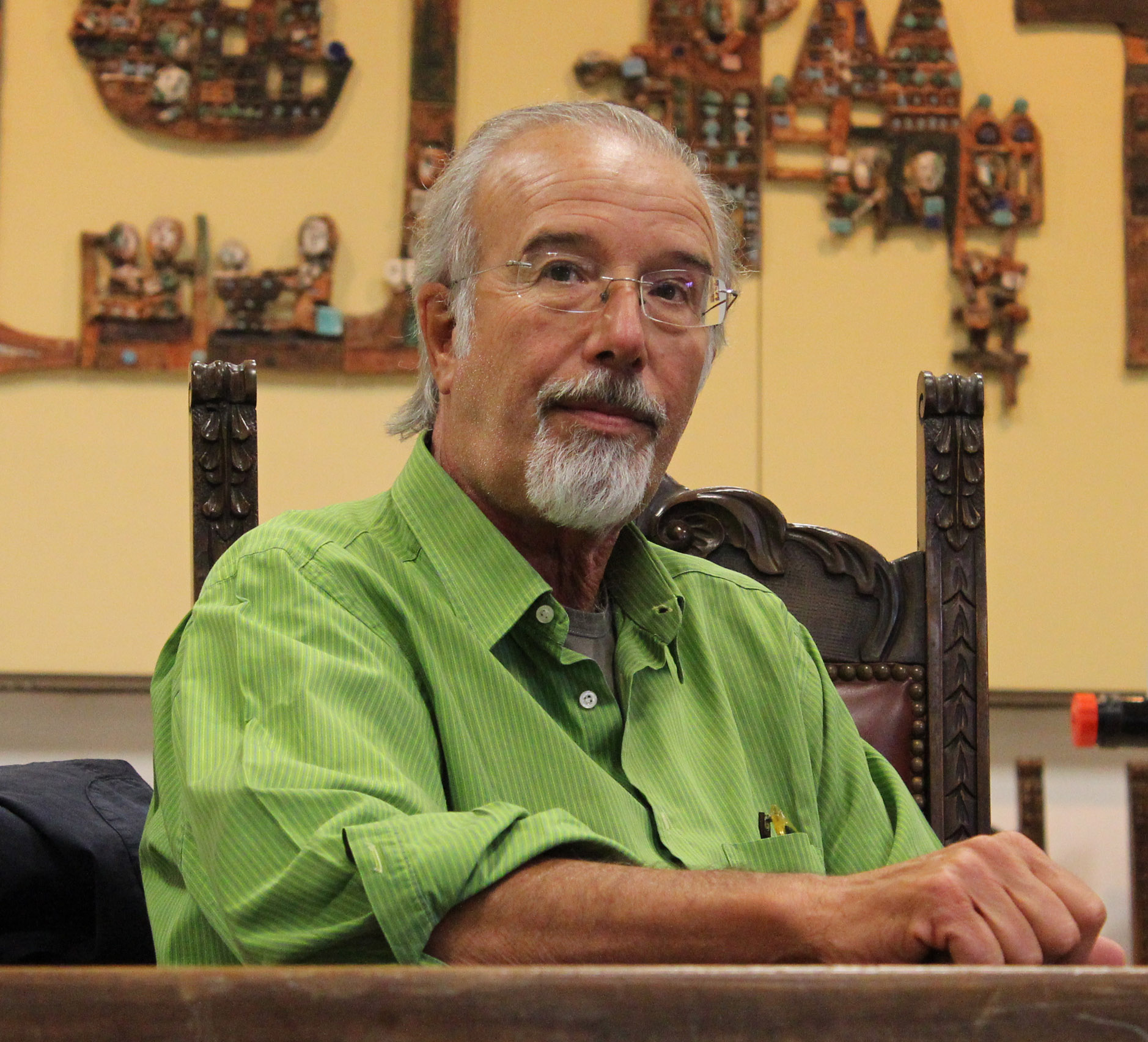
- Cavazzano in 2013
- Born: 19 October 1947 (age 79) Venice, Italy
- Areas: Artist; writer; cartoonist
- Notable works: Paperinika
- Awards: U Giancu's Prize, 1999

Giorgio Cavazzano (Italian: [ˈdʒordʒo kavatˈtsaːno]; born 19 October 1947) is an Italian cartoonist and one of the most famous Disney comics artists in the world.

== Biography ==
Giorgio Cavazzano was born on 19 October 1947 in Venice, Italy. At the age of twelve, Cavazzano started to work with his cousin, the cartoonist Luciano Capitanio, helping him ink comics for the publishers Mondadori and Dardo, as well as a comic story published in the magazine Voci d’Oltremare. Still a teenager, he started his apprenticeship with the renowned Italian cartoonist Romano Scarpa, and at the age of 15, from issue #70 of Topolino (December 1962) ‑ he was Scarpa's personal inker.

Cavazzano made his debut as a cartoonist in 1967 with the story "Paperino e il singhiozzo a martello", while his first script was on "Zio Paperone e il cambio della guardia", in 1985.

At the beginning of his career, his style was affected by Romano Scarpa's style and the prevailing tradition of comic drawing of Carl Barks. Later, Cavazzano developed his own distinctive style, which marks a watershed between the traditional and the modern way of drawing Disney ducks and mice.

In his career, he has co-created numerous characters, including Queen Reginella, Humphrey Gokart, O.K. Quack, Pandy Pap (Italian name), and the most recent one, Brick Boulder. In 1981, he started drawing Disney stories for the French weekly magazine Le Journal de Mickey and covers for the magazines Mickey Parade and Super Picsou Géant. Since 1994, Cavazzano has been drawing covers and stories for the Scandinavian publisher Egmont, including the 2003 The Saga of Dragon Lords.

In 1999, he and the writer Tito Faraci launched the Disney noir series of MM Mickey Mouse Mystery Magazine. Their artistic partnership led him to draw a superhero comic set in Cavazzano's home town, Venice, Il segreto del vetro (2003); this was the very first Spider-Man story realized entirely by Italian creators. This is not his only tribute to the Marvel world. The year after, Giorgio drew a cover for a special issue of Devil & Hulk for the 10th anniversary of Marvel Italy.

Cavazzano has produced many non-Disney comics as well. With writer Giorgio Pezzin, Cavazzano introduced "Walkie e Talkie" in Il Corriere dei Piccoli (1973–1975), "Oscar e Tango" in Il Messagero dei Ragazzi (1974), "Smalto e Johnny" in Il Mago (1977), "Capitan Rogers" in Il Giornalino (1981–1989) and "Timothée Titan" in Le Journal de Mickey (1987).

With Tiziano Sclavi, the creator of Dylan Dog, Cavazzano drew the saga of Altai & Jonson in 1975. He also partnered with Bonvi, the creator of Sturmtruppen, to produce "Maledetta galassia" and "La Città", published by Sergio Bonelli Editore.

Cavazzano has contributed to the Italian tradition of "Le Grandi Parodie Disney", a series of parodies of literary works, theatre, opera and cinema masterpieces. Cavazzano has drawn parodies of the films Casablanca, La Strada, 1900 and The Man Without a Past. In 2017, Topolino published Bruno Enna and Giorgio Cavazzano's homage to Hugo Pratt's Corto Maltese: Topo Maltese: Una ballata del topo salato.

In addition to comics, Cavazzano has produced a vast amount of illustrations and advertising material, among others for Eldorado, Fiat and Xerox.
