= Paperinik =

Disney comics character

- Donald as Paperinik, by Marco Rota.

Publication information
- First appearance: "Paperinik il diabolico vendicatore" ("Paperinik the Diabolical Avenger") published in Topolino #706–707, on June 8 and June 15, 1969
- Created by: Elisa Penna (editor-in-chief), Guido Martina (writer), and Giovan Battista Carpi (artist)

In-story information
- Alter ego: Donald Duck
- Species: Anthropomorphic duck
- Place of origin: Duckburg
- Abilities: Genius intellect and strategist; Skilled in hand-to-hand combat; Master of disguise and acting; Costume includes multiple hidden weapons and accessories; Various high-technology equipment; Modified armoured and armed car, also capable of air and water transport

Paperinik logo

Paperinik, also known as PK (Italy, pronounced [ˌpiˈkappa]), Superduck (UK and Digicomics) or Duck Avenger (US), (Note: The latter used in Italy for Donald as a fictional superhero different from Paperinik.) is a comic book vigilante and Donald Duck's alter ego. The character was created in Italy by Elisa Penna, Guido Martina and Giovan Battista Carpi, and first appeared in the Italian comic series Topolino #706 (June 1969).

In the comics, Donald originally created Paperinik as a dark avenger alter-identity to secretly seek revenge upon relatives, before he soon found himself fighting other menaces as a vigilante. He subsequently appeared in many stories on other Disney publications, some of which were entirely dedicated to the character. In 1996, he became the protagonist of the ongoing PK saga (it), which follows an independent sci-fi narrative. This started with the series PK – Paperinik New Adventures (PKNA; known in the United States as Duck Avenger), in which Paperinik becomes a superhero facing villains and more dangerous enemies, especially the Evronians alien race.

While initially created for dedicated Paperinik stories, the character was soon integrated into the standard Italian Duckburg continuity. The PK comics were translated into multiple languages and were adapted in other media, most notably video games.

== Original version ==
Donald originally created Paperinik as a dark avenger alter-identity to secretly seek revenge upon relatives such as Scrooge McDuck and Gladstone Gander, but he soon found himself fighting other menaces as a superhero. The Italian creators (editor-in-chief Elisa Penna, writer Guido Martina, and artist Giovan Battista Carpi) introduced Paperinik in the two-part, 60-page story "Paperinik il diabolico vendicatore" ("Paperinik the diabolical avenger") published in Italy in Topolino #706–707, on June 8 and June 15, 1969, in response to complaints from readers about Donald's constant bad luck. The name "Paperinik" was initially meant to reference the Italian comic book antihero Diabolik, to which Paperinik's original depictions bear similarities. The character was also inspired by Fantômas and Batman.

The debut story featured Donald receiving the ownership papers of Villa Rosa, an abandoned villa outside of Duckburg whose owner had disappeared decades ago. Donald finds that the ownership papers were actually intended for his cousin Gladstone, but he is content not to correct the mistake. Visiting the villa with his nephews, he discovers the diary and an abandoned suit of Fantomius (Fantomallard), who was known as a notorious gentleman burglar and sometime vigilante active long ago. Donald learns Fantomius's methods of maintaining a secret identity by acting as a harmless and rather incompetent gentleman during the day and during the night as a vindicator, taking revenge for his grievances against society.

In the early stories, Paperinik was an anti-hero vindicator inspired by Diabolik and Fantômas. The writers toned this aspect down later and turned him into a Batman-style heroic avenger instead, and he started targeting the criminal population of Duckburg, in particular the Beagle Boys. This still remains his main mission today, although he occasionally faces higher profile adversaries and finds missions which require him to travel away from Duckburg.

Paperinik's most important ally in his heroic identity is the inventor Gyro Gearloose, who fabricates most of his special equipment, but (in some stories) without knowing his identity. To be able to equip and support Paperinik without risk of accidentally disclosing his secret identity, Gyro has invented the Caramelle cancelline (or Car-can in short, meaning "erasing sweets"), pills which causes complete loss of memory of the most recent few hours upon ingestion: after every meeting with Paperinik, Gyro takes one of these pills as a safety precaution. They are called UhKa, short for unohda kaikki in Finnish or VergAll, short for vergiss alles in German, both meaning "forget everything". Later stories, however, disregard this particular detail.

Paperinik keeps his real identity as Donald Duck secret from everyone - even from his own nephews. To this end, he has constructed a secret hideout beneath his house, which is accessible by a secret elevator located in a clothes cabinet in his bedroom. When Donald embarks on his patrol as Paperinik at night, he pretends to go to sleep, and leaves a dummy figure representing his own head on the pillow complete with recorded snoring noise, on the chance his nephews should go and take a look at his bedroom during the night.

Donald's set-up with his secret hideout sometimes runs into problems, as he is only renting his home - the owner of the house is his uncle Scrooge McDuck, who is as oblivious of Donald's secret identity as Donald's nephews are, and Donald is often running late on his rent. Scrooge sometimes goes as far as to temporarily let out Donald's home to other tenants, or threaten to have it dismantled altogether, which puts Paperinik's secret hideout in danger of being revealed.

== PK (1996–present) ==
The character was renewed in PK - Paperinik New Adventures (often shortened as PKNA), a series of comics published in Italy between 1996 and 2000 in which the character of Paperinik, here often called "PK" for short, is revolutionised and featuring stories with more mature tones and dedicated story arcs. In this issue, after Gyro "resigned" from being Paperinik's armourer (as shown in a special issue), Donald finds himself aided and geared up by "Uno", an extremely advanced AI, into dealing with new threats coming from space or from the future: distinctive weapon from this series is the Extransformer Shield, an all-purpose advanced robotic gauntlet. The series was science fiction and while previously-existing Disney characters were rarely seen, it introduced its own universe of characters like PK's allies, such as the gynoid time-policewoman Lyla Lay or the alien Xadhoom; recurring antagonists were the evil "Evroniani" aliens and time criminals such as the "Razziatore" (Red Raider in the US). After closing the various arcs introduced with the series, it ended with the impending return of Everett Ducklair, Uno's creator. The series was followed by a sequel named PK² (2001–2002), which started directly from where PKNA ended, with the return of Everett Ducklair to Duckburg. PK² was considerably shorter than PKNA and the story arcs revolved mostly around Ducklair's ambitions and the consequences of his past mistakes. After Ducklair shuts down Uno and forbids PK to use his inventions as well as his tower at the very beginning of the series, it keeps its core not only on PK as a superhero but also on Donald as a citizen and person, introducing more mature topics linked to the everyday life (also in relation to PK's struggles as a hero) and more realistic interactions between characters.

After PK², a reboot named PK - Pikappa (2002–2005) was published. This series aimed to rewrite and revamp Paperinik/PK's origins by keeping some few core elements from PKNA: as a matter of fact, here Donald has never even been Paperinik and he gains his secret identity after being selected and hired by the AI U.N.O. as a "guardian of the galaxy" (Donald chooses "PK" as his name when the other Guardians ask for it and he makes it up quickly reading part of a code printed on his equipment). This last series was a decent commercial success but, though having most of the cast of writers and artists from the previous two issues, was poorly received because of the clear cut from PKNA and PK² in favour of shorter, lighter, simpler and often self-contained stories, but also because of the overall lower quality of stories and illustrations - so much so that among Italian fans, it's commonly and disparagingly nicknamed as "PK - Frittole" (meaning "stain").

Starting from Topolino #3058, PK received new stories resuming the PKNA continuity, beginning with PK - Might and Power: a series of four episodes written by Francesco Artibani and drawn by Lorenzo Pastrovicchio, in which the Raider and Odin Eidolon (Uno's future persona) persuade Donald after years to go back to his Paperinik identity, and prevent the Evronian empire from rising again. In May 2015 has been published the four-episode issue PK - The Banks of Time, which focuses on time paradoxes and marks the return of Lyla Lay; this venture is scripted by Alessandro Sisti, designed by Claudio Sciarrone and colored by Max Monteduro. These new issues, nicknamed by fans Paperinik New Era (shortened as PKNE) as they don't have a collective name, revolve around the same themes of the original magazine (albeit in a lighter manner, being now part of the Topolino comic book) evolving them from their original closing, bringing back old characters and introducing new ones, such as the ambiguous Keeper of the Omega Chamber (another AI designed by Ducklair) and Moldrock.

In the United States, Paperinik stories were published as Duck Avengers in comic book series including Disney Adventures, Donald Duck and Disney Masters. Some issues of the third PK series were also digitally distributed on Disney's Digicomics platform with the title Superduck. The origin story of Paperinik premiered in a two-part issue under the title "The Diabolical Duck Avenger" in 2015.

== Other media ==
In 2002, a video game loosely inspired by PKNA was released for PlayStation 2 and GameCube, titled PK: Out of the Shadows (sometimes called Donald Duck PK, or just PK). In the game, Donald Duck, security guard of the Ducklair Tower, is transported into the artificial intelligence secret area and tasked with saving the world from the Evronians. He is given special powers, and told that he has become a "platyrhynchos kineticus", an energized duck, or PK for short, stepping around his Paperinik roots. The game received mixed reviews and once represented the only English language use of the name PK. Before the game and after it until 2016 when IDW Publishing did official English translations for the comics, "Duck Avenger" has remained standard in American comic books.

In 2008, a mobile Java game known as PK: Phantom Duck was released; with the help of Gyro, Paperinik has to fight against the plans of the Beagle Boys there.

Paperinik was an unlockable character in a video game The Duckforce Rises in 2015.
