= Florida's Natural Growers =

Agricultural cooperative based in Florida

Florida's Natural
- Type: Agricultural cooperative
- Founded: 1933
- Headquarters: Lake Wales, Florida, United States
- Members: 1100
- Website: floridasnatural.com

Florida's Natural Growers is an American agricultural cooperative based in Lake Wales, Florida. It is currently owned by over 1,100 grower members.

== History ==
Florida's Natural Growers was founded in 1933 as Florida Citrus Canners Cooperative. Its initial operations included canning juice and grapefruit sections for its members, and in 1938 began extracting juice with automated machines. During World War II, the company produced concentrated orange juice for the military; after the war, 80% of the juice the company produced was in frozen concentrate form to meet consumer demand for the relatively new, convenient form.

In the 1960s, consumer demand shifted to ready-to-drink orange juice, and frozen concentrate sales declined while demand for chilled juices increased. In 1969, the cooperative took the name Citrus World and adopted the current name, Florida's Natural Growers, in 1998. It is currently composed of 12 representatives of 14 citrus cooperatives: Waverly Growers Cooperative, Lake Placid Cooperative, Ben Hill Griffin Inc., Haines City Citrus Growers Association, Orange Growers Marketing Association, Lake Wales Citrus Growers Association, Hunt Brothers Cooperative, Citrus Marketing Services Inc, Peace River Packing Company, Dundee Citrus Growers Association, Winter Haven Citrus Growers Association, and Umatilla Citrus Growers Association, Southern Gardens Citrus Growers, and Lykes.

In 2001, the company opened the "Grove House", a visitor center across the street from its Lake Wales, Florida processing plant.

== See also ==
- Agriculture in Florida
