= PKNA =

1996–2000 Italian Donald Duck superhero comic

PK – Paperinik New Adventures
- Paperinik New Adventures #0: "Evroniani"; Art by Marco Ghiglione

Publication information
- Publisher: Disney Italy
- Schedule: Monthly
- Format: Ongoing
- Genre: Science fiction, action, adventure, dramedy, thriller
- Publication date: March 1996 – January 2001
- No. of issues: 56
- Main character: Paperinik

Creative team
- Created by: Alessandro Sisti; Ezio Sisto; Claudio Sciarrone; Max Monteduro
- Written by: Alessandro Sisti; Francesco Artibani; Bruno Enna; Tito Faraci
- Penciller(s): Claudio Sciarrone; Lorenzo Pastrovicchio; Alberto Lavoradori; Paolo Mottura

PK – Paperinik New Adventures (PKNA) is an Italian comic, published by Disney Italy from 14 March 1996 to 20 December 2000, about the new adventures of Paperinik (known as Duck Avenger in the United States), the superhero created in 1969 by Guido Martina, Elisa Penna and Giovan Battista Carpi, which served as Donald Duck's secret identity.

The first issue of the series was called "Evroniani", and featured Paperinik's new alien enemies, the Evronians. Introduced in the same issue were Paperinik's two new allies, the A.I. Uno (One), who resides in the skyscraper Ducklair Tower, and Lyla Lay (Lyla Lee), a journalist and robot utilized by a time police organization based in the 23rd century.

The series was extremely well received at the beginning of its run, and saluted as an unexpectedly innovative project for Disney. In 2016, IDW Publishing announced plans to start publishing an official English translation of the series written by Jonathan Gray under the title "Duck Avenger".

== Themes ==
The PKNA writers developed more adult themes than the classical Disney stories published in the Italian magazine Topolino. Throughout the series' run, they used themes such as: the relationship between man and robot; the struggle between what is right and what is logical; the essence of true love; the difference between mankind and other alien races; the essence of being a superhero; the relationship between knowledge and power; the importance of History and past historical events.

Among the writers of the Pk Team, were many talented and generally young authors: Francesco Artibani, Davide Catenacci, Gianfranco Cordara, Bruno Enna, Tito Faraci, Augusto Macchetto, Alessandro Sisti, Simone Stenti, Ezio Sisto. The PK project was seen as a testbed for a generation of new authors, who were given ample freedom to innovate, leaving behind many of the typical storytelling conventions of the company and creating a blend of the "classical" Disney comics and the American superhero comic books, which were a primary and acknowledged source of inspiration. Despite this, both the company and the public were deeply used to Disney characters being used for kid-friendly stories, so a slow transition towards edgier storytelling and graphic depictions was required.

Especially in the first issues, there is a contrast between the harsh themes hinted at or explicitly introduced by the narrative and the depicted events. It is made clear since the beginning that the Evron empire has depopulated a number of worlds, killing or enslaving billions of intelligent aliens, and a main character clearly announces to have sworn to destroy the entire Evronian race in revenge: but the fights with the Evronians mostly feature the usual Disney slapstick violence, with no graphic depictions of any hero killing or realistically wounding an enemy (while entire starships could be destroyed in the background). Despite this, the Italian readers didn't decry the restraint but were content with scenes they deemed already audacious for a conservative comics company like Disney.

The character of Paperinik was firmly based in the established Topolino continuity as the superheroic secret identity that Donald Duck had already assumed long before the start of the series: but connections with the "classic" Paperinik stories was cut short since the first number, giving Donald completely new allies, weaponry and occupations. The appearances of the other Duckburg characters were reduced to a minimum, and many of them (like Gyro Gearloose and Huey, Dewey & Louie) were written off the story even if they were featured prominently in the previous Paperinik adventures. This reinforced the notion that PK was meant to be a "real superhero", existing in its own world, related to but fundamentally different from the mostly parodic and humorous Paperinik.

== Short stories ==
PKNA is also famous for its short side stories that follow the main story in most issues. All of those short stories are more artistic than the regular main story.

=== Angus Tales ===
The first series of short 8-page stories are Angus Tales and the main character is Angus Fangus. These series consist of 7 stories. All of those stories were mostly colored with yellow, orange, brown, gray and black ink, giving it a little "vanishing" atmosphere. The plot of those stories is usually about how Angus gets into trouble (there is usually a gangster or more involved), and how he gets out of it. All of the stories are drawn by Silvia Ziche.

=== Arriva Trip (Trip incoming) ===
The second series of the short 8-page stories are about Trip, Razziatore's (Red Raider) son. This is the first of two series about Trip. The plot of this series is to introduce Trip.

=== Starring the great Burton La Valle ===
The third series is of 8-page short stories is "Starring the great Burton La Valle". Burton La Valle is an actor from the 23rd century, and those stories are about Burton and what he does at work. This series is also experimenting with different styles of art. This series is one of the more artistic/experimental of all the short story series.

=== Vedi alla voce Evron (See under Evron) ===
The fourth series is about Evronians, and it's named "Evron - Extracts from the infoguide". There is not really a story or plot in this series, but the series gives information about the Evronian empire in an illustrated way.

=== 5Y ===
The fifth series of the 8-page stories is about the Class 5Y Droid; Lyla Lay (Lyla Lee). Some of the stories are about some of her minor problems, and the rest of them is about her normal life.

=== Io sono Xadhoom (I am Xadhoom) ===
The sixth series of short stories somewhat differ from the other series (except the third one) with the fact that there are no black outlines between different colored objects. Those short stories are about short happenings in Xadhoom's life.

=== Fuori... onda (Off... the air) ===
The seventh series of short stories is about "Behind the screens" at Chanel 00.

=== Trip's strip ===
The eighth series of short stories is the second series about Trip. This series is introduced by the short story of issue #34, what is a side story of the main story in I PKNA #34. In this series, Trip has to draw its own super-hero comic, and he ends up with a character named "Time-Boy". Time-Boy is Trips Alter-Ego.

=== Lo zen e la fisica dei quanti (Zen and quantum physics) ===
The ninth series is the last series of 8-page stories. This series is about Everett Ducklair's normal life at a monastery in Tibet.

== The art of PKNA ==
- PKNA represented a change from the classic Disney comics style, such as Italian Topolino. The format of each PKNA issue was bigger and similar to that of American comics. The size and the order of the panels break the traditional six panels order, alternating splash pages, and longer or flattered panels. Strong colorization, with monochromatic panel, is used to mark emotional moments or action. Inspiration also comes from Japanese manga and American comics, with the use of kinetic lines, eye representation, and muscular characters drawn in an oblique way in the panels.
- The comic was a showcase for the talent of so many young, at the time, comic artists: Graziano Barbaro, Alessandro Barbucci, Fabio Celoni, Andrea Ferraris, Andrea Freccero, Francesco Guerrini, Ettore Gula, Stefano Intini, Alberto Lavoradori, Corrado Mastantuono, Paolo Mottura, Lorenzo Pastrovicchio, Manuela Razzi, Claudio Sciarrone, Stefano Turconi, Silvia Ziche and many others. They were almost all scholars of the great Giovan Battista Carpi.
- PKNA, with its revolutionary style, set the basis for other great Disney comics, such as MM Mickey Mouse Mystery Magazine, W.I.T.C.H., Monster Allergy and many others.
- There are several quotes from famous books or movies, such as Blade Runner.

== End of PKNA ==
After issue #30, some short arcs were created, focusing on Xadhoom, Razziatore, Lyla Lay, Due (Two) and other characters to finish their stories. The last issue is a double issue, in which Everett Ducklair appears, in the Dhasam-Bul (Paro Taktless) monastery, with a Book of Destiny. He changes past events to create several new timelines, but all of them create new problems so he ends up restoring the original timeline. The following series, PK2, got a mixed response from fans.

== See also ==
- MM Mickey Mouse Mystery Magazine
