= Bertani =

Bertani is an Italian surname. Notable people with the surname include:

- Agostino Bertani (1812–1886), Italian physician and revolutionary
- Alex Bertani, Italian comic book editor
- Bill Bertani (1919–1988), American soccer player
- Corinne Bertani (born 1959), Monegasque politician
- Cristian Bertani (born 1981), Italian footballer
- Giovanni Battista Bertani (1516–1576), Italian painter and architect
- Matt Bertani (born 1976), American ice hockey coach
- Orsini Bertani, Italian-Uruguayan editor
- Pietro Bertani (1501–1558), Italian bishop and cardinal
- Rogério Bertani, Brazilian arachnologist
- Romeo Bertani (born 1999), Italian footballer

== See also ==
- Italian destroyer Agostino Bertani, a destroyer of the Italian Regia Marina (Royal Navy)
- Villa Mosconi Bertani, a Neoclassic villa in Verona
