= Tuffolino =

Italian substitute for Mickey Mouse during the Fascist Period

- Tuffolino character
- The appearance of the character in one of the comic strips
- First appearance: "Tuffolino the agent of advertisment"; 10 February 1942
- Last appearance: "Tuffolino and the explosive pepper"; 21 December 1943
- Created by: Federico Pedrocchi and Pier Lorenzo De Vita
- Based on: Mickey Mouse

In-universe information
- Species: Human
- Gender: Male
- Significant other: Mimma
- Nationality: Italian

Tuffolino is a comic book character created by Federico Pedrocchi and Pier Lorenzo De Vita which replaced Mickey Mouse on the various publications of the Italian edition of the Topolino book series following February 1942, after the limitations imposed by the Italian government of Mussolini regarding the right of freedom of press.

== History ==
=== Background ===
Following the establishment of an autarkic policy by the fascist regime in Italy, following the year 1938 the ministry of popular culture imposed restrictions on the freedom of the press, such as restrictions regarding the publication of American comic books.

Initially Mickey Mouse was spared (probably because of the "good relations" between Mussolini and Mondadori), however starting from the 303th weekly publication (13 October 1938) all American comic books that were not from the Disney Company were replaced by comic books produced in Italy. Another theorized reason was because Romano and Anna Maria were fans of Disney, especially franchises involving Mickey Mouse and Peter Pig (they had a kid-sizes wooden statue of Mickey Mouse in their room). However, Romano himself stated that his father did not directly protect the publication of Mickey Mouse, but rather the Grand Council of Fascism initially deemed the comic politically irrelevant on its own. An additional reason was the economic accords between William Randolph Hearst and Arnoldo Mondadori which guaranteed the export of the comics.

After a while, however, the developments in the new realities brought by World War II and the increasingly warmer relations between the Allied Powers and the United States of America started to put into question the exemptions given to the Mickey Mouse comic books. In April 1941 Arnoldo Mondadori started talks with the ministry of popular culture about a proposed extension of the exemption regarding such comics at least up until the end of the year, especially since changing the name of the publications would have impacted in a sever manner the funds of the company; After all, besides the fact that the Mickey Mouse's stories occupied 3 pages out of the total 12/16 average total pages of the journals published by Mondadori, the stories were not all made in America, but also partially made by Italian authors. extension to the exemption was approved, however in December 1941, after the entry of the US in the war and their declaration of war against Italy, starting from the 477th weekly release on 3 February 1942, the weekly publishment of the Mickey Mouse comic book was also abruptly ended, and at the end of that same edition, the publication of "Tuffolino the agent of advertisment" was announced to replace Mickey Mouse following that date. The very last story of Mickey Mouse that was published in Fascist Italy's history was "Mickey Mouse in Love Trouble". The comic was finished in a hurrisome manner in the 44th weekly release with the 27 comic strips present in the original comic summarized in 5 explicative comic strips; this was done so the readers would be able to read the ending of the story and at the same time respect the orders directions given by the fascist regime, which demanded that starting from the 478th weekly publication there would not be any stories which involved Mickey Mouse.

=== Introduction of Tuffolino ===
Mickey Mouse was thus substituted by Tuffolino, a human that had similar physical features as Mickey Mouse, aside from the fact that he was not an antropomorphic animal but rather a human, drawn by Pier Lorenzo De Vita. The debut of Tuffolino was in the comic strip named "Tuffolino the agent of advertisment"", which was just a redrawn version (with humanized versions of various Disney characters) of the Mickey Mouse comic strip named "Supersalesman", which had just been released in the United States. In fact the journal had already received the "Supersalesman" story from the U.S., before the government had banned Mickey Mouse, however now it was impossible to publish it unless the characters were changed. That is why Pedrocchi decided to hand over the story to De Vita who redesigned the characters substituting the characters with new original characters: Mickey Mouse had become Tuffolino, Minnie Mouse had become "Mimma" and Clarabelle Cow had become "Clara".

The plot was basically the same as the original: Tuffolino is a hyperactive boy which is always out for adventure, worrying his girlfriend, Mimma, who's afraid that he could at any moment go on some kind of adventure that'd put his life at risk; thus Mimma, after a discussion with "Clara", in the end decides to convince Tuffolino to work in an advertisement company. After reaching the company building, in the third strip of the 16th episode, in the conclusion of the original story, Mickey Mouse and Minnie get rewarded by their boss with a coupon and a week of vacation, however, the story starts to change from this point onward in the Italian version. The story was stretched by Pedrocchi and De Vita up until they reached a "18th episode" with some additional strips, completely original, which functioned as a way to connect this story with the next one, named "Tuffolino on a vacation". In the ending of the comic book we are introduced to "Pippo" (who's named in the same way as "Goofy" is in most Italian editions of the original Disney Comic) who's very similar to its original counterpart, including its clothes and personality which are basically the same; The only different part of his body is his face which is "humanized". This story gets concluded on the 495th edition, on 9 June 1942.

The following stories, this time completely original, are three:

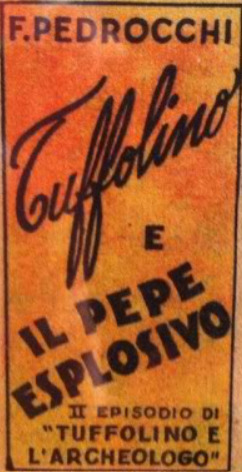
1. Tuffolino's logo and title page of his third adventure, "Tuffolino and the explosive pepper" by Federico Pedrocchi
  Tuffolino on vacation (n° 496–503, from 16 June to 4 August 1942)
2. Tuffolino and the archeologist (n° 504–536, from August 11, 1942, to 23 March 1943)
3. Tuffolino and the explosive pepper (n° 537–564, from 30 March to 21 December 1943)

The text of the stories are always from Federico Pedrocchi, whilst the author is always Pierlorenzo De Vita. The only exception is Tuffolino and the explosive pepper, which's drawings are from an unknown author (However, according to Alberto Becattini, Gustavo Petronio was the author).

Whilst "Tuffolino the agent of advertisment" and "Tuffolino on vacation" are mostly comical and focus on the lives of the various characters (such as their works and their vacation), the very last two stories are more adventorous despite not abandoning the comical themes of the previous stories (which is often surreal). In "Tuffolino the archeologist" Tuffolino is convinced by a professor to tag along with him in an archeological expedition on a tropical island (where Pippo is located) however, in order to articulate the story, a professor who is a rival to the one alongside Tuffolino also organizes a rivaling expedition and on top of that two members of the professor crew seem to be plotting against him. In "Tuffolino and the explosive pepper", which is defined as an episode two to the previous comic at the start of every "episode" within the comic, Tuffolino and Pippo, accused by the local authorities of being pirates and to have caused the disappearance of both of the professors, return to the island, determined to prove their innocence and to ruin the evil plots of the antagonist, who detains the professors on the island and wants to use a substance known as "explosive pepper" for evil deeds. Alongside Tuffolino and Pippo, Mimma, Clara, a rector and Mr Bimbo ( an investigator of the police force who's convinced that Tuffolino and Pippo are guilty) tag along in search of the professors in a rescuing expedition. The story comes to an end in the 564th release with a happy ending.

The stories of Tuffolino were released, initially on the last pages of the publication and later on in the middle pages, up until the suspension of the publications in December 1943. The temporary stop to the publications starting from 21 December 1943 determined the disappearance of the character; when the publication started again, in December 1945, Mickey Mouse returned to legality within Italy, thus Tuffolino, his substitute, had no reason to exist anymore.

== Data ==
- Gadducci, Fabio (2011). Eccetto Topolino. Lo scontro culturale tra fascismo e fumetti. Battipaglia (SA): Nicola Pesce Editore. ISBN 978-88-97141-04-4.
