= Roope-setä =

Roope-setä (Finnish for "Uncle Scrooge", named Roope-setä taskulehti (the Uncle Scrooge pocket book) from 1978 to 1995) was a Finnish comic book published by Sanoma Media Finland from 1978 to 2017, containing comics from the Donald Duck universe. The main protagonist in the comic was Scrooge McDuck.

== Publication schedule ==
The comic was launched in 1978 and four issues were published in that year. From 1979 to 1980 the comic was published every second month, but from 1981 to 2014 it was published monthly. A new issue came out on the first Wednesday of the month.

Since 2015 the comic was published ten times per year. The time interval between issues was about five weeks, so the comic was published in January, February, March, April, June, July, August, September, November and December. The weekday for new issues was Friday.

== Content and structure ==
The comic usually included three or four long stories and possibly a few shorter stories, which had not been published in Finland earlier. The stories were mainly imported from the Italian Topolino comic book.

As well as the actual comics stories, the comic book included features such as Vanhan visukintun päiväkirja ("The old miser's diary", from 1985 to 2003), Klubimestarin palsta ("The club master's column", from 1987 to 2003), Roope-sedän tietotoimisto ("The Uncle Scrooge information agency", from 2004 to 2011) and Päivän Pamaus ("The Daily Bang", a common newspaper name in Finnish Disney comics, from 2012 to 2017). The comic book also included Dekkaripähkinät ("Detective puzzles", from 2004 to 2017). Up to issue #1/2017 almost every issue also included a competition. The comic book often contained short articles about Disney comics and artists. Subscribers were sent exclusive presents on many years.

From 1985 to 1987 every issue contained a single-page comic by Carl Barks translated into Finnish. Since 1987 these comics were published in the original English, but in 2000 they were published in other languages as well. In 2001 these Carl Barks comics were replaced with single-page comics by Al Taliaferro translated into various Finnish dialects. Since 2002 these comics were again published in English and their writers and artists varied.

From 1997 to 2003 and from 2005 to 2011 the comic book also included collectible pictures and each year had its own theme:

- 1997: Don Rosa's art
- 1998: Carl Barks's art
- 1999: Villains in Disney comics
- 2000: The best moments of the old miser
- 2001: Scrooge McDuck's family and friends
- 2002: Scrooge McDuck's treasures
- 2003: Historical highlights from 1978 to 2003
- 2005: The 75th anniversary of Disney comics
- 2006: Villans and heroes
- 2007: Festive portraits of Scrooge McDuck
- 2008: In the shadow of the stars
- 2009: The year of Donald Duck
- 2010: The 40th anniversary of Donald Duck pocket books
- 2011: The portrait of the month

Issue #1/2007 included an announcement that the December 2007 would be the thickest issue of the entire Roope-setä comic book so far, in celebration of the 60th anniversary of the Donald Duck character.

Issue #1/2008 included a shortened reprint of the first issue of the Roope-setä comic in 1978, in celebration of the 30th anniversary of the comic book.

In January 2012 the comic book changed in size: the number of pages remained the same, but the width and height of the pages increased by a couple of centimetres in order to make better use of the Topolino comics.

In 2012 the comic had a circulation of 73,094 copies. In 2016 the circulation had shrunk to 42,587 copies.

In 2017 the Sanoma concern announced it would discontinue the Roope-setä comic book and replace it with a new DuckTales comic book, with existing subscriptions transferred to the new comic automatically. The last issue of the comic book, issue #10/2017 (the 454th issue in total) was published in December 2017.
