= Topolino =

Italian Disney comics magazine launched in 1932

Topolino (from the Italian name for Mickey Mouse) is an Italian digest-sized comic series featuring Disney comics. The series has had a long-running history, first appearing in 1932 as a comics magazine. Since 2013, it has been published by Panini Comics.

== Topolino giornale (1932–1949) ==
Topolino
- Topolino No. 1

Publication information
- Publisher: Nerbini (n°1–136); Mondadori (n°137–738)
- Schedule: Weekly
- Format: Ongoing
- Publication date: 31 December 1932 – 9 April 1949
- No. of issues: 738

In 1932 the editor Mario Nerbini decided to open a new weekly newspaper for kids, containing illustrated tales with Mickey Mouse. The first issue of Topolino was published on December 31, 1932: it contained Mickey's first Italian story drawn by Giove Toppi. In this story, Mickey Mouse was chased by an elephant. However, Nerbini had not correctly secured the publication rights, so when Emmanuel (Disney's representative in Italy) protested, Nerbini changed the title of the comic book with issue #3 into Topo Lino (Mouse Lino), replacing Mickey Mouse with Topo Lino, another mouse. When Nerbini bought the publication rights from Disney and King Features Syndicate, he changed the title back to Topolino with issue #5. Floyd Gottfredson's stories made their debut in Topolino #7 with a Sunday page featuring Mickey, his girlfriend Minnie Mouse, and Mickey's nephews Morty and Ferdie Fieldmouse. Topolino published mainly Mickey Mouse Sunday pages; the daily strips were published in the supplement to the newspaper.

Topolino had eight pages and also published non-Disney comic strips such as Tim Tyler's Luck (Cino e Franco). In 1935 Topolino published Bobo the Elephant, Mickey Mouse and the sacred jewel and Mickey Mouse and Pluto the racer. The same year Arnoldo Mondadori's publishing house Mondadori bought the newspaper; the first issue published by Mondadori was #137.

In 1937 Topolino and I tre porcellini, Mondadori's newspapers for kids, merged into Topolino: Grandi avventure ("Mickey Mouse: Great adventures"). The page count increased from eight to sixteen. The first page published a story in instalments by Floyd Gottfredson starring Mickey Mouse and his friends; the other pages published American stories such as Tim Tyler's Luck as well as Italian stories such as Saturno contro la Terra, a story by Federico Pedrocchi (also editor of Mondadori's comics) in which Rebo (the dictator of Saturn, who later appeared as Donald Duck's enemy in four Italian stories drawn by Luciano Bottaro) made his debut. December 1937 also saw the publication of a companion newspaper, Paperino e altre avventure (Donald Duck and Other Adventures), which ran for three years before being merged with Topolino in October 1940.

In 1938, Mussolini's fascist government forbade the publishing of American stories except Disney stories (his children liked Mickey Mouse, so Mussolini delayed the ban as long as possible). Topolino continued to publish Mickey Mouse stories until February 3, 1942 (#477, containing the last episode of Mickey Mouse in love trouble) when they were forced by the fascist government to stop publishing Mickey's stories. For two years, Mickey Mouse was replaced by Tuffolino, a human character very similar to Mickey. Tuffolino made his debut in Tuffolino agente di pubblicità, a remake (starring non-Disney characters) of the American story Mickey Mouse, super salesman (1941). Tuffolino and his friends (Mimma, Clara) very much resembled Mickey, Minnie and Clarabelle Cow. Tuffolino's stories were written by Pedrocchi and drawn by Pier Lorenzo De Vita. The newspaper had to cease all publications in December 1943 (#564).

In December 1945, Mondadori resumed publication of Topolino. Because of the fall of fascism in Italy, Mondadori could once again publish Mickey Mouse stories by Floyd Gottfredson. Topolino also began publishing Donald Duck stories by Carl Barks. Topolino #713 published the first episode of Topolino e il cobra bianco, written by Guido Martina and drawn by Angelo Bioletto; this was the first long Italian story to be published in the newspaper. In 1949, Mario Gentilini, Topolino's director, decided to convert the newspaper into a pocket comic book containing only Disney stories. The last issue of Topolino (giornale) was #738; on April 10, 1949, the first issue of Topolino digest (libretto) format was released.

== Topolino libretto ==
Topolino
- Cover of the first Topolino libretto (1949)

Publication information
- Publisher: Mondadori (n°1–1701); Disney Italia (n°1702–3018); Panini Comics (n°3019–present)
- Schedule: Weekly
- Format: Ongoing
- Genre: Anthropomorphic
- Publication date: 10 April 1949 – present
- No. of issues: 2689 (as of 2 August 2026)
- Main character(s): Mickey Mouse universe Donald Duck universe

Topolino started as a monthly comic book, and the first issue was released on April 10, 1949: it had 100 pages and its price was 60 lire. The first issue contained the final part of Topolino e il cobra bianco, the first episode of Gottfredson's Mickey Mouse and the man of Tomorrow (the story where Eega Beeva makes his debut), a Carl Barks ten-pager where Gladstone Gander makes his second appearance (though it's the first story with the character to be published in Italy), the long story Pluto Saves the Ship, written by Barks, Jack Hannah and Nick George and drawn by an unidentified illustrator, the first episode of a long Barks story (The Old Castle's Secret, where Scrooge McDuck makes his second appearance), and many stories about minor characters like Br'er Rabbit, Li'l Bad Wolf, etc.

Mickey's Inferno (L'inferno di Topolino), written by Guido Martina and drawn by Angelo Bioletto, was the second Italian story to be published in Topolino (#7–12): a parodic retelling of Dante Alighieri's Inferno. The panels of the comic also have a poem, written using hendecasyllables in terza rima, describing what's happening in each scene. Mickey's Inferno was the first Italian Great Parody and the first Disney story featuring credits, albeit partially: in the first panel, under the title of the story, it is written "verseggiatura di G. Martina", meaning "verses by G. Martina"; however, Martina was only credited for the poem and not for also writing the story, while Bioletto's work was similarly uncredited. The third Italian story to be published was Topolino e i grilli atomici (literally Mickey Mouse and the atomic crickets, #13-16), written by Martina and drawn by Bioletto: for the latter, it was his third and last Disney work. However, Topolino published mainly American stories by Carl Barks, Floyd Gottfredson, Paul Murry and others and in 1951 the periodical published only American stories.

In 1952, the comic book became biweekly, and the Italian stories increased. Italian stories were written mainly by Guido Martina, who wrote the first great parodies of the classics of literature: in 1956 he wrote Paperino Don Chisciotte (a parody of Don Quixote) and in 1957 he wrote Paperin di Tarascona (parody of Tartarin of Tarascon), Paperino e il conte di Montecristo (parody of The Count of Monte Cristo) and Paperino e i tre moschettieri (parody of The Three Musketeers); these stories were drawn by skillful artists such as Pier Lorenzo De Vita and Luciano Bottaro. These parodies were successful among the readers, so many other writers such as Carlo Chendi, Dalmasso, Missaglia and Romano Scarpa began to write parodies. The duo Chendi (writer)-Bottaro (artist) wrote many great parodies such as Dr. Paperus (parody of Dr. Faustus), Paperino il paladino, Paperin Furioso (parody of Orlando Furioso by Ariosto), and Paperino e il tesoro di Papero Magno. One of these parodies, Paperin Meschino (Martina/De Vita, 1958), revealed why Donald is persecuted by bad luck (Paperin meschino, one of his ancestors (he lived in the 15th century), was cursed by a witch: "You and all your descendents will be persecuted by bad luck for 1000 years!").

Romano Scarpa wrote and drew many masterpieces such as Paperino e i gamberi in salmì, Topolino e l'unghia di Kali (English: "Kali's Nail"), Topolino e la dimensione delta ("Mickey Mouse in the Delta Dimension"), Topolino e la collana chirikawa, Topolino imperatore della calidornia, Paperino e le lenticchie di Babilonia ("The Lentils from Babylon"), Paperin Hood. He also created many new characters such as Atomo Bleep-Bleep (Atomino Bip Bip), Trudy Van Tubb (Peg Leg Pete's girlfriend), and Brigitta MacBridge, a female duck enamoured of Scrooge (though the feelings are unrequited). Rodolfo Cimino was initially Scarpa's inker; later he became a skillful writer. He wrote many stories about Scrooge's treasure hunts. He also created Reginella, an alien female duck enamoured of Donald Duck; unfortunately, their love is impossible.

In 1960, Topolino became a weekly. In 1969, Guido Martina created Paperinik (Duck Avenger), the superheroic alter ego of Donald Duck. Inspired by the then-popular fictional character Diabolik as well as Fantômas, Paperinik was originally the diabolic avenger of Donald Duck, and he originally committed criminal acts, i.e., stealing Uncle Scrooge's money, in order to avenge Donald (Scrooge said to Donald "you aren't able to steal not even a nut from a squirrel"). As this was not considered a good role model for Topolino's young readers, he soon became a superhero, especially reminiscent of Batman.

Giorgio Pezzin was another skillful Italian writer. He wrote many sagas, i.e. I signori della galassia (The Lords of Galaxy, a sort of parody of Star Wars), C'era una volta in America (Once Upon a time in America, a far west saga that tells the story of the United States through the lives of Mickey's ancestors) and The Time machine saga. In the time machine saga Mickey Mouse and Goofy are sent back in time through a time machine by Professor Zapotec and Professor Marlin of Mouseton's museum in order to resolve the great mysteries of history (i.e. "Why did Napoleon always put his hand in his pocket?").

Massimo De Vita was the son of Pier Lorenzo De Vita. He drew many stories. He wrote also some stories, such as the Ice Sword Saga starring Mickey and Goofy in a fantasy world threatened by the "Lord of the Mists". Another skillful artist was Giovan Battista Carpi, who drew masterpieces such as Paperino missione Bob Fingher (Donald Duck mission Moldfinger, a great parody of the James Bond film Goldfinger, known in Italian as Agente 007 - Missione Goldfinger, "Agent 007 - Mission Goldfinger") and Paperinik il diabolico vendicatore. He also wrote and drew some stories, such as the great parodies Guerra e pace (War and Peace) and Zio Paperone e il mistero dei Candelabri (parody of Les Misérables by Victor Hugo).

Casty is another writer and artist. Some of his stories featuring Mickey Mouse have been published in the United States in Walt Disney's Comics and Stories and in Mickey Mouse.

== Editors ==
- Mario Gentilini 1949-1980
- Gaudenzio Capelli 1980-1994
- Paolo Cavaglione 1994-1999
- Gianni Bono 1999-2000
- Claretta Muci 2000-2007
- Valentina De Poli 2007-2018
- Alex Bertani and Marco Marcello Lupoi 2018-today
