= Giove Toppi =

Italian cartoonist

Giove Toppi (2 August 1888 – 21 July 1942) was an Italian cartoonist and the first to draw Mickey Mouse comics in Italy.

== Biography ==
Toppi was born in Ancona, Italy and moved to Florence in the 1920s. There, he began what would become a long collaboration with the publisher Nerbini, initially as a cartoonist for the satirical weekly Il 420 and as an illustrator for their novels.

Toppi designed the headline logo and contributed comics to the Topolino, a weekly children's magazine themed on the Disney character Mickey Mouse. He also contributed to other Nerbini magazines such as L'Avventuroso, which was published starting from 1935.

== Career ==
Toppi had a long history of contribution and publication with the Italian publisher Nerbini.

Toppi was a contributor to the weekly Mickey Mouse-themed magazine Topolino, named after the character's Italian name. He was originally commissioned to design the headline logo and illustrate the first page comic strip for the inaugural edition, making him the first Italian author of a Mickey Mouse cartoon. Shortly after its 1932 launch, the magazine ran into problems regarding rights over the character and was temporarily re-spun into Il Giornale di Topo Lino, for which Toppi and Gaetano Vitelli created a new character, Topo Lino. After Nerbini had acquired the rights to Mickey Mouse and began publishing the original American cartoon strips, Toppi continued to contribute comics to Topolino, signing his work as "Stop!" and creating characters such as Sorci Jazz (first appearing in No. 9) and Sorcettino (a renamed Topo Lino).

Toppi also contributed to other Nerbini magazines such as L'Avventuroso, in which he published adventure comic series. Toppi learned from major American series published in L'Avventuroso, absorbing the novelty of their graphical language and giving it his own spin. As one of the principal Italian contributors to the magazine, he became published on the last page, one of the reserved spaces of the magazine alongside the first page, with his main series alternating with, for example, Flash Gordon comic strips. His series La regina dei pirati (The Queen of the Pirates) features a vaguely feminist anti-hero as protagonist, while Una donna a bordo (A Woman on Board) had more comedic elements. In 1936, he published series such as I naufragatori misteriosi (The Mysterious Ship-Wreckers) and La regina d'Atalanta (The Queen of Atalanta). He created the first Italian detective series, Renato Gallo, which appeared in La Sfida del Bandito in the 1930s.

Toppi would also produce illustrations for serialised novels appearing in L'Avventuroso. He illustrated most of the book covers dedicated to American comics characters such as Mandrake the Magician, Phantom or Tim Tyler's Luck.
