= Tempo (Italian magazine) =

Weekly news magazine in Italy (1939–1976)

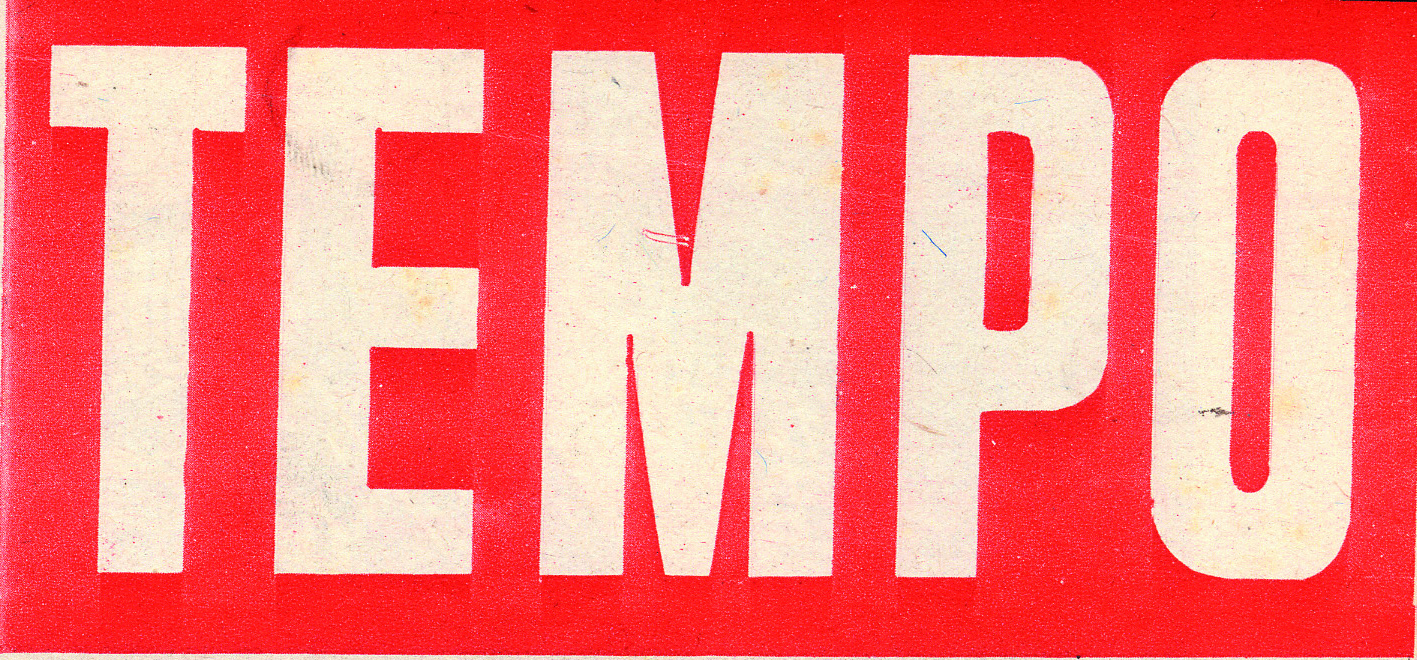

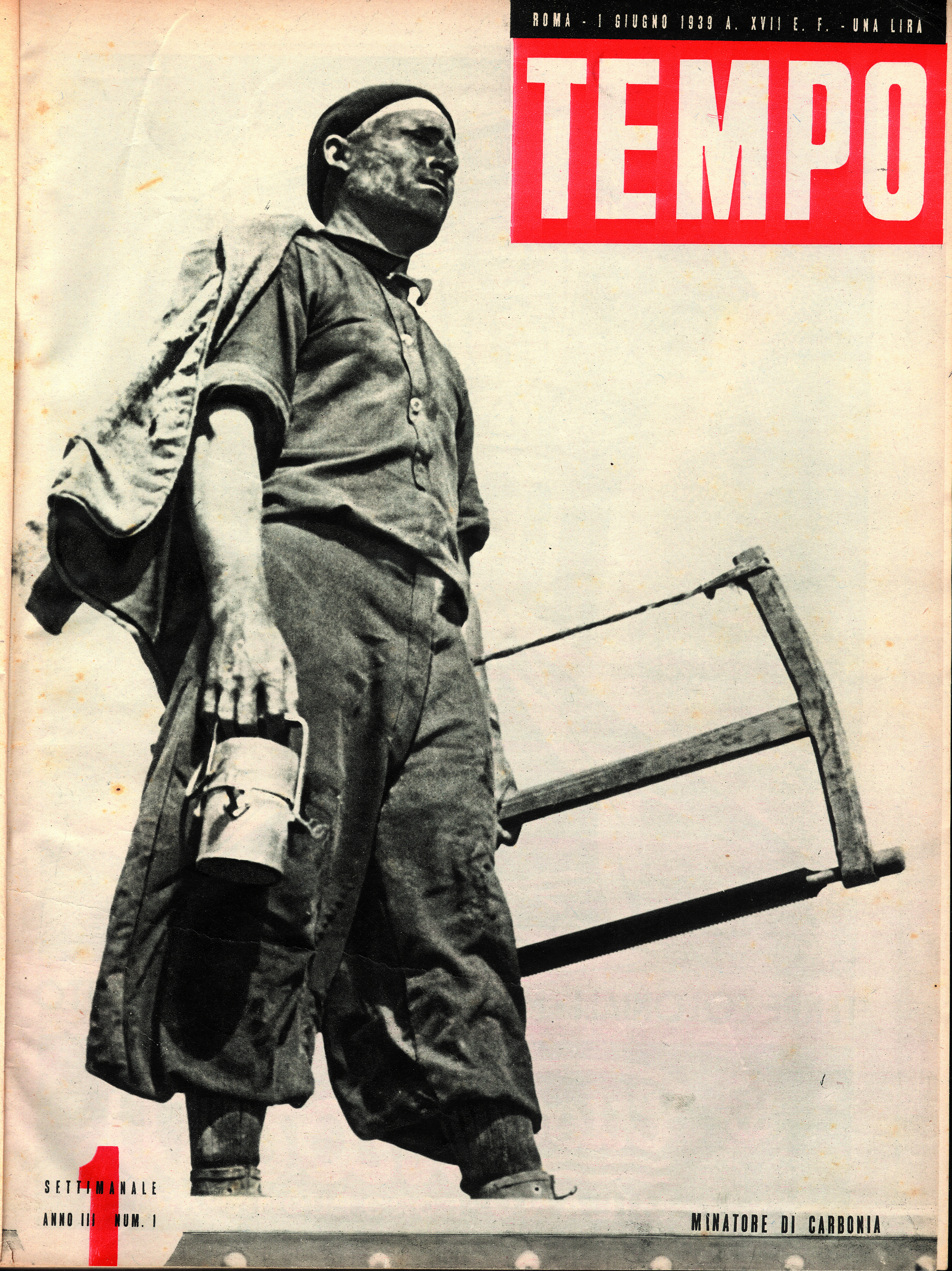
- Cover of the first issue, June 1939
- Former editors: Alberto Mondadori; Indro Montanelli
- Categories: News magazine
- Frequency: Weekly
- Founded: 1939
- First issue: 9 June 1939
- Final issue: 1976
- Company: Mondadori; Palazzi
- Country: Italy
- Based in: Milan
- Language: Italian
- ISSN: 1128-2959
- OCLC: 436686743

Tempo (Italian: Time) was an illustrated weekly news magazine published in Milan, Italy, between 1939 and 1976 with a temporary interruption during World War II.

== History and profile ==
Tempo was first published on 9 June 1939, being the first full colour illustrated Italian magazine. It was subtitled as Settimanale di politica, informazione, letteratura e arte (Italian: Political, informational, literary and art weekly). The founding company was Mondadori. The magazine was modelled on the American magazines Life and Newsweek.

The headquarters of Tempo was in Milan. By 1942 The magazine had editions published in eight different languages, including Albanian, Croatian, French, Greek, Rumanian, Spanish, German and Hungarian. The German edition existed between 1940 and 1943 and was also published by Mondadori.

On 8 September 1943 Tempo stopped publication following the occupation of northern Italy by German army during World War II. Mondadori sold the magazine to Aldo Palazzi in 1946. Then the magazine was relaunched and was both owned and published by Palazzi. During this period it held a centrist political stance. In the 1950s Tempo was less sentimental and adopted a progressive and secular political stance.

Tempo sold 500,000 copies in 1955 making it one of the most read magazines in Italy. In the 1960s the magazine frequently carried political and news articles with moderate and conservative tones. In 1976 the magazine ceased publication.

== Editors and contributors ==
Tempo was edited by Alberto Mondadori, son of Arnoldo Mondadori. Indro Montanelli was the first editor-in-chief of the magazine. From its start in 1939 to September 1943 Bruno Munari served as the art director for the magazine and for another Mondadori title, Grazia. The early contributors for Tempo were Massimo Bontempelli, Curzio Malaparte, Lamberti Sorrentino, and Salvatore Quasimodo. In the late 1960s Pier Paolo Pasolini was the editor of an advice column named Il caos (Italian: Chaos). The magazine also included the work by photographers John Philiphs who previously worked for Life, and Federico Patellani.

== Content ==
Major sections of the magazine included politics, news, literature and art. Although it was modeled on Life, unlike it Tempo covered much more political topics.

The cover of its 22nd issue (dated 16–22 June 1946) became the symbol of the freshly-proclaimed Italian Republic. The photo, taken by the magazine's photographer Federico Patellani (1911–1977), features a smiling young woman holding an issue of Corriere della Sera newspaper with the headline "È nata la repubblica Italiana" (Italian: The Italian republic is born), with her head sticking out through the newspaper. The woman was identified in 2016 as Anna Iberti (1922–1997), who at the time worked as a clerk in administration in the socialist newspaper Avanti!.

In 1948 Tempo published the interview with the Italian bandit Salvatore Giuliano by the American journalist Michael Stern which was originally published in True magazine in 1947.
