= Gaetano Vitelli =

Italian cartoonist

Gaetano Vitelli is an Italian cartoonist who, along with Giove Toppi and Antonio Burattini, was one of the first to make a Mickey Mouse comic strip in Italy.

== Biography ==
He entered the creative staff of the Nerbini publishing house in Florence in 1932 and remained there until 1940; for the weekly Topolino debuted at the end of 1932, the publisher had not correctly secured the rights and, pending the acquisition of them correctly, the title was provisionally modified from n. 3 in "Il Giornale di Topo Lino" and the character of Topolino was replaced by "Topo Lino", created by Giove Toppi and Gaetano Vitelli; correctly acquired the rights from King Features Syndicate, from n. 5 the original head was restored but the series of Topo Lino di Toppi and Vitelli continued up to the n. 6. Nerbini then secured the rights to publish the comic book series created by Floyd Gottfredson and, in addition to these, Nerbini was granted by the licensee to publish others made in Italy; these stories will be created by Antonio Burattini and by Vitelli who will then be, together with Giove Toppi, the first Italian authors of Disney. Vitelli then made a couple of stories from a page with "Mickey Mouse" and others with other non-Disney characters in the period since 1933 to 1935. "Topo Lino" will reappear only later renamed "Sorcettino", always made by Toppi and Vitelli.

For the same publisher he also made stories for L'Avventuroso and, for Il Giornale di Cino e Franco instead draws "Tony il Saltimbanco" (1936), "Le perle nere" (1937), "Il segreto dei giganti" (1937-1938) and, in addition, the serie "Scintillino e il fantasma" published in 1938 on Pinocchio, "Gli scorridori del mar dei Caraibi" on Giungla (1938) and "Il Palombaro Italiano" on "Pisellino" (1940).

For the publishing house E.R.O.L.A. he wrote and drew in 1948 the "Albi del Trio dell'Astuzia" with a series of comic stories with Pinocchio and a graphically very different and (maybe) apocryphal Mickey Mouse from the Disney version, and the short series of "Album di Avventure" with some stories with Gordon; he also collaborated with the collection of illustrated books "Collezione per i Più Piccini", dedicated to well-known personalities such as Pinocchio, Snow White, Charlot, Fortunello and 11 with apocryphal Mickey Mouse.

During the thirties he also collaborated with Il Vittorioso and with Cartoccino dei Piccoli.
