= Bruno Munari =

Italian artist and designer (1907–1998)

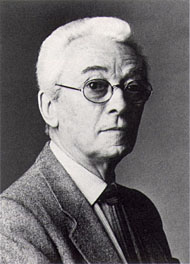
- Born: 24 October 1907; Milan, Italy
- Died: 29 September 1998 (aged 90); Milan, Italy
- Resting place: Cimitero Monumentale, Milan, Italy
- Occupations: Artist, designer, writer

Signature
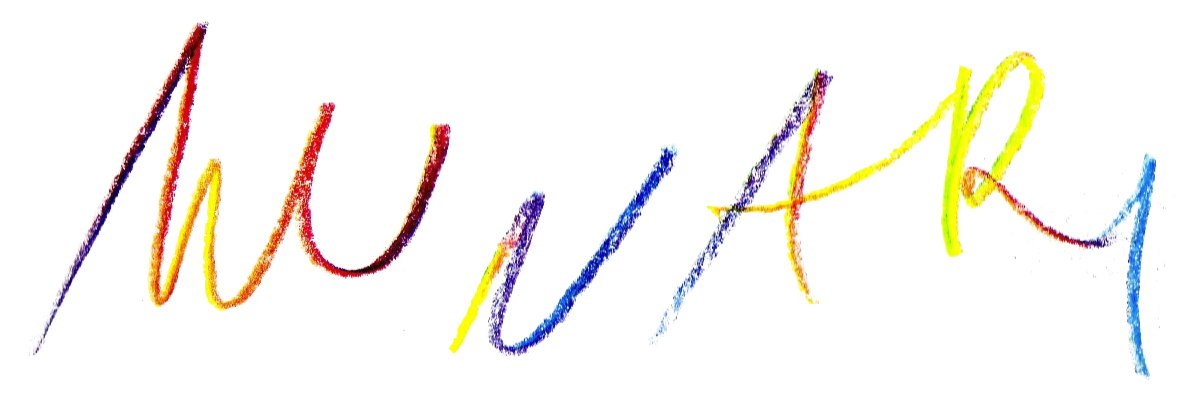

Bruno Munari (24 October 1907 – 29 September 1998) was "one of the greatest actors of 20th-century art, design and graphics". He was an Italian artist, designer, and inventor who contributed fundamentals to many fields of visual arts (painting, sculpture, film, industrial design, graphic design) in modernism, futurism, and concrete art, and in non-visual arts (literature, poetry) with his research on games, didactic method, movement, tactile learning, kinesthetic learning, and creativity. On the utility of art, Munari once said, "Art shall not be separated from life: things that are good to look at, and bad to be used, should not exist".

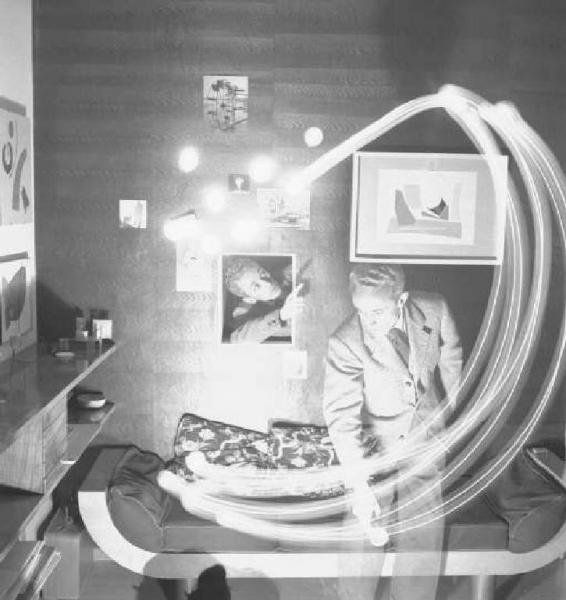
Bruno Munari photographed by Federico Patellani (1950)

== Early life ==
Bruno Munari was born in Milan but spent his childhood and teenage years in Badia Polesine, where his family had relocated to run a hotel. In 1926, he returned to Milan, where he started to work with his uncle, who was an engineer. In 1927, he started to follow Marinetti and the Futurist movement, displaying his work in many exhibitions. Three years later, he associated with Riccardo Castagnedi (Ricas), with whom he worked as a graphic designer until 1938. During a trip to Paris, in 1933, he met Louis Aragon and André Breton. From 1938 to September 1943, he worked as a press graphic designer for Mondadori, and as art director of Tempo Magazine and Grazia, two magazines owned by Mondadori. At the same time, he began designing books for children, originally created for his son Alberto.

== Futurism ==
Bruno Munari joined the 'Second' Italian Futurist movement in Italy led by Filippo Tommaso Marinetti in the late 1920s. During this period, Munari contributed collages to Italian magazines, some of them highly propagandist, and created sculptural works which would unfold in the coming decades, including his useless machines, and his abstract-geometrical works. After World War II Munari disassociated himself with Italian Futurism because of its proto-Fascist connotations.

== Later life ==
In 1948, Munari, Gillo Dorfles, Gianni Monnet and Atanasio Soldati founded Movimento Arte Concreta (MAC), the Italian movement for concrete art. During the 1940s and 1950s, Munari produced many objects for the Italian design industry, including light fixtures, ashtrays, televisions, espresso machines, and toys, among other objects.

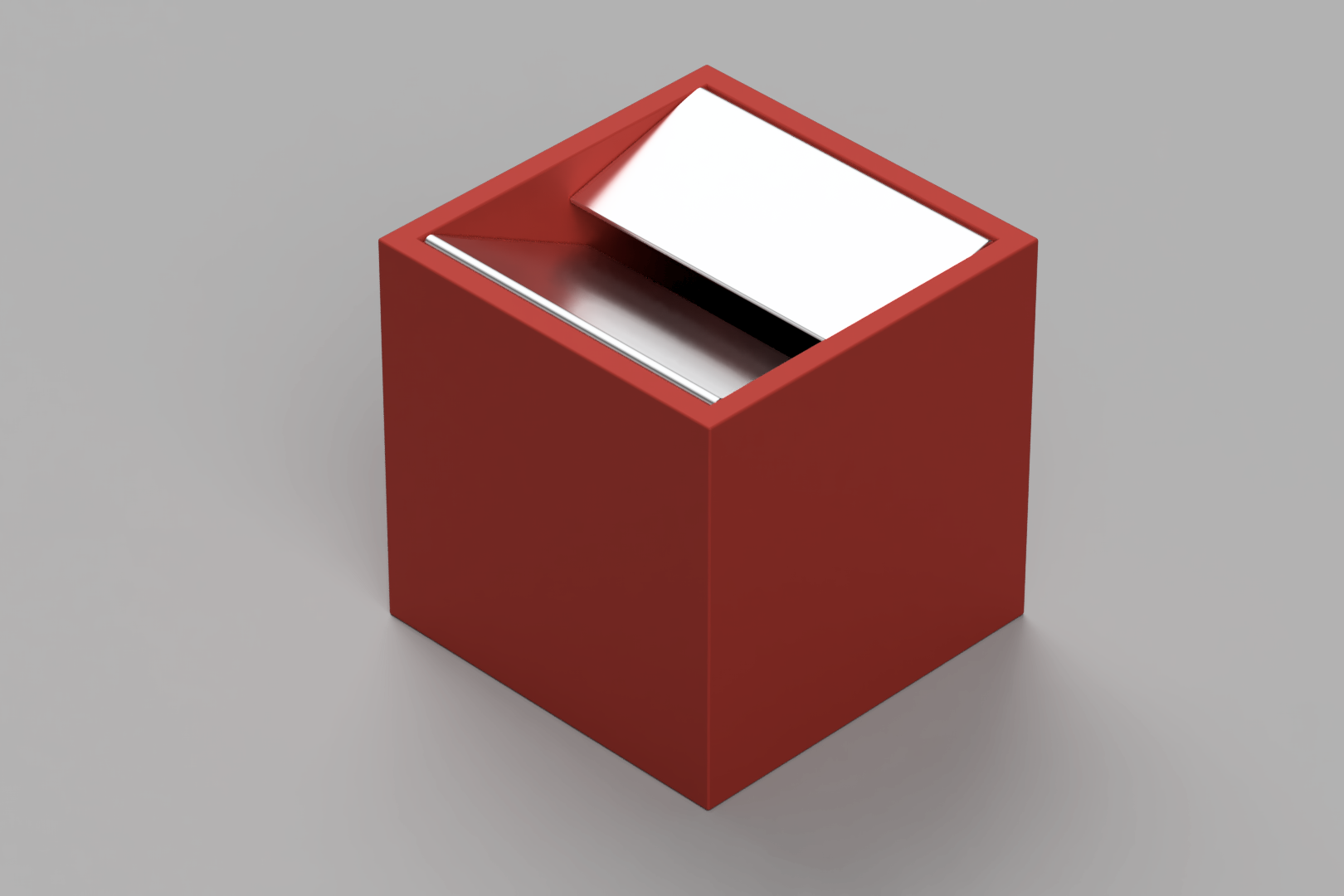
Cubo ashtray designed for Danese Milano (1957)

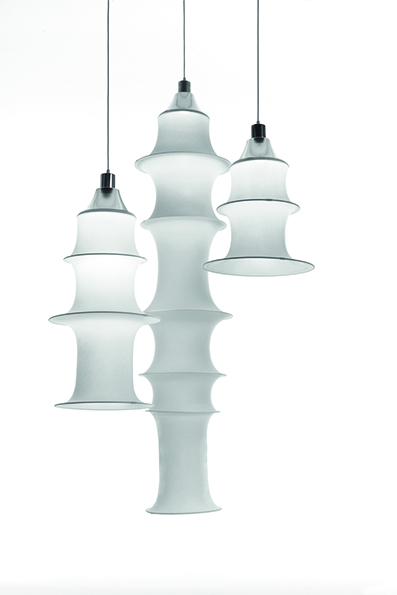
Falkland pendant light designed for Danese Milano

In his later life, Munari, worried by the incorrect perception of his artistic work, which is still confused with the other genres of his activity (didactics, design, graphics), selected art historian Miroslava Hajek as curator of a selection of his most important works in 1969. This collection, structured chronologically, shows his continuous creativity, thematic coherence and the evolution of his aesthetic philosophy throughout his artistic life.

Munari was also a significant contributor in the field of children's books and toys, later in his life, though he had been producing books for children since the 1930s. He used textured, tactile surfaces and cut-outs to create books that teach about touch, movement, and colour through kinesthetic learning.

Munari died in Milan on 29 September 1998.

Bruno Munari's estate is represented by Andrew Kreps Gallery, New York.

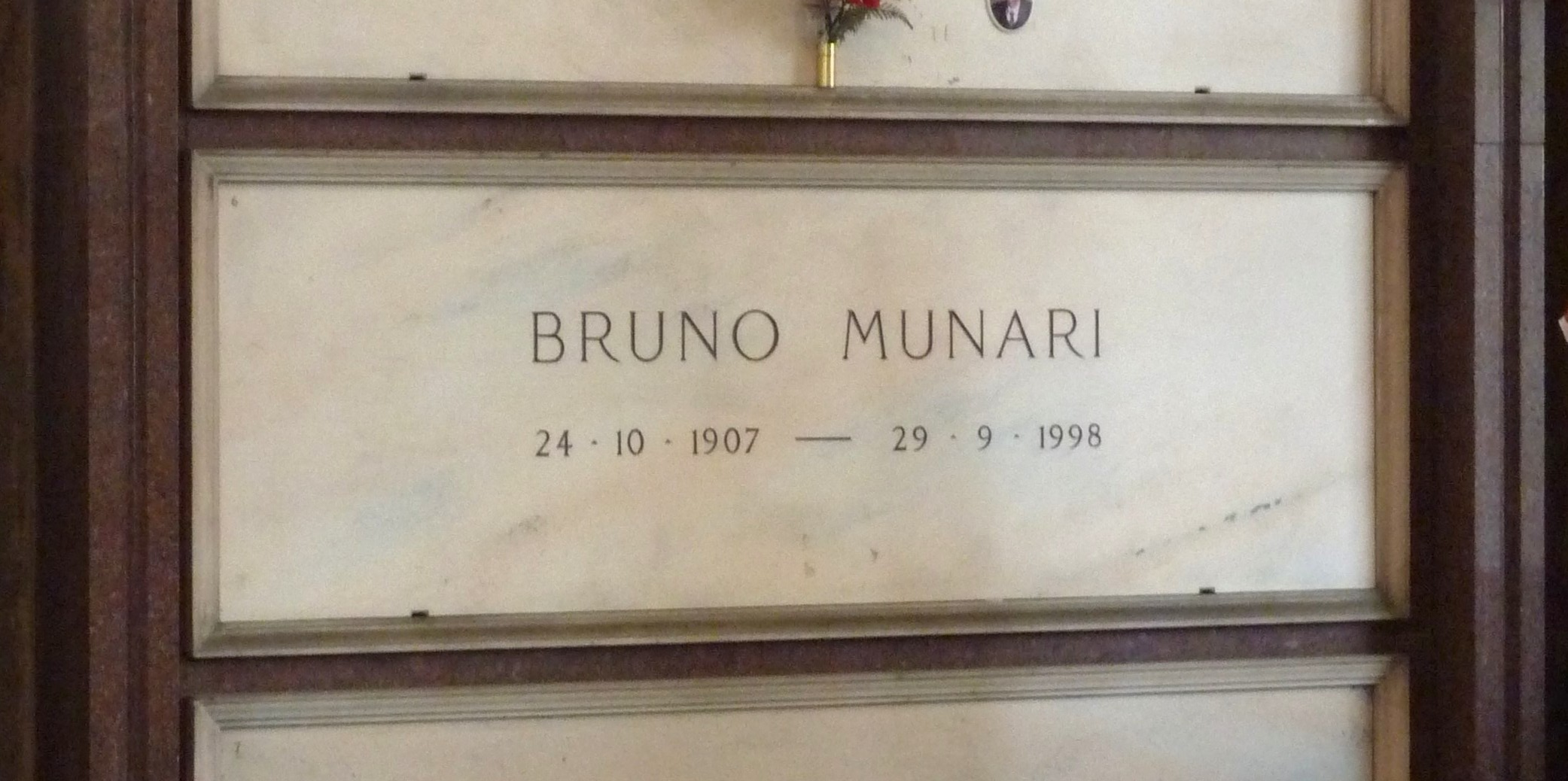
Munari's grave at the Cimitero Monumentale in Milan, Italy, in 2015

== Design and visual communication works ==
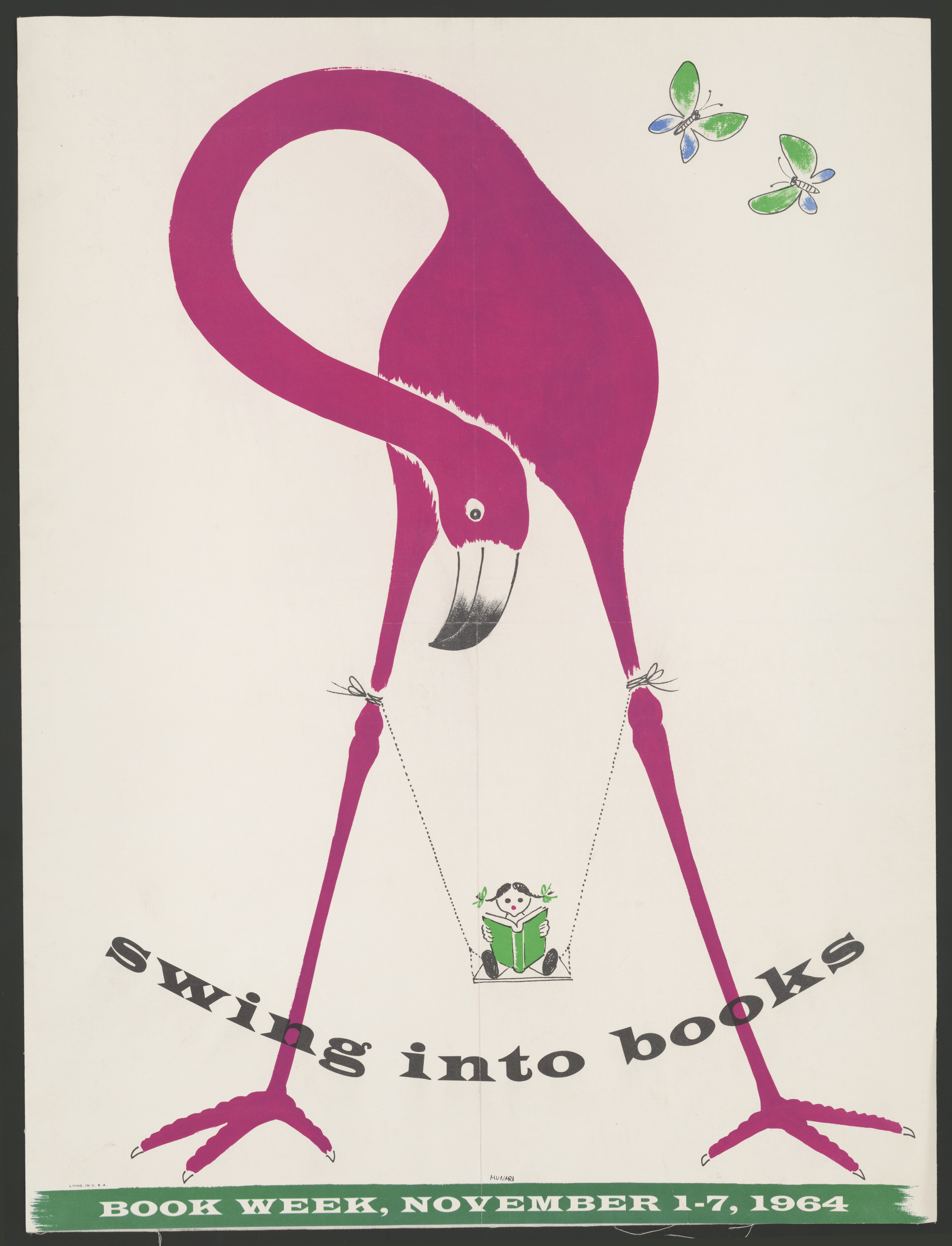
Swing into books, Book week, November 1–7, 1964

- Munari, Bruno; Scheiwiller, Giovanni (1963). Good design. Milan: All'insegna del pesce d'oro (later Scheiwiller Editore)
- Munari, Bruno (1966). Arte come mestiere [Design as Art (literally: Art as Craft]. ISBN 978-0-14-103581-9.
- Munari, Bruno (1968). Design e comunicazione visiva. Contributo a una metodologia didattica (Design and Visual Communication. Contributions to a Teaching Method). Roma-Bari: Laterza
- Munari, Bruno (1971). Artista e designer [Artist and Designer]. Roma-Bari: Laterza
- Munari, Bruno (1971). Codice ovvio [Obvious Code]. Turin: Einaudi
- Supplemento al Dizionario Italiano. Mantova, Italy: Corraini. 2014

The following are included in Design as Art. They have also been published individually:

- The Triangle. Mantova, Italy: Corraini. 2007.
- The Discovery of the Circle. New York: G. Wittenborn. (English translation by Marcello and Edna Maestro.) 1965.
- Discovery of the Square. New York: George Wittenborn. (English translation by Desmond O'Grady.) 1965.

== Educational games and workshops ==
From 1988 to 1992, Munari collaborated personally in the educational workshops of the Luigi Pecci Centre for Contemporary Art in Prato, training the internal staff, namely Barbara Conti and Riccardo Farinelli, who will continue and coordinate the museum workshops on an ongoing basis until 2014.

- Le costruzioni in legno "Scatola di architettura" for Castelletti (1945)
- I giocattoli Gatto Meo (1949) and Scimmietta Zizì (1953) for Pirelli
- From 1959 to 1976, various games for Danese (Proiezioni dirette, ABC, Labirinto, Più e meno, Metti le foglie, Strutture, Trasformazioni, Dillo coi segni, Immagini della realtà)
- Le mani guardano (1979), Milano
- Primo laboratorio per bambini at Accademia di Belle Arti di Brera in Milano (1977)
- Laboratorio "Giocare con l'arte" at Museo internazionale delle ceramiche in Faenza (1981) in collaboration with Gian Carlo Bojani.
- I laboratori per bambini del Kodomo no shiro (Castello dei bambini) in Tokyo (1985)
- Giocare con l'arte (1987) Palazzo Reale, Milano
- Giocare con la natura (1988) Museo civico di storia naturale, Milano
- Giocare con l'arte (1988) Centro per l'arte contemporanea Luigi Pecci, Prato, laboratori permanenti
- Ritrovare l'infanzia (1989) Fiera Milano, Workshops dedicated to the elderly, Milano
- Un fiore con amore (1991) Giocare con Munari at Workshop of Beba Restelli
- Giocare con la fotocopiatrice (1991) Giocare con Munari at Workshop of Beba Restelli
- Il "Libro letto", trapunta scritta che è sia libro che letto (1993) for Interflex
- Lab-Lib (1992) Giocare con Munari at Workshop of Beba Restelli
- Giocare con la puntatrice (1994) Giocare con Munari at Workshop of Beba Restelli
- Tavole Tattili (1995) Giocare con Munari at Workshop of Beba Restelli

== Munari's books for children ==
- The Elephant's Wish. The World Publishing Company. 1945.
- Bruno Munari's Zoo. Cleveland: World Pub. Co. 1963.
- In the dark of the night. (Nella notte buia) New York: G. Wittenborn. 1961.
- The circus in the mist. New York: World Pub. Co. 1969.
- The elephant's wish. Cleveland: World Pub. Co. 1959.
- "What I'd like to be". London (23 Lower Belgrave Street, London SW1): Printed and made in Italy and published by the Harvill Press. 1945.
- Jimmy has lost his cap: where can it be? New York: W. Collins. 1980.
- Who's there?: Open the door. New York: W. Collins. 1980.
- Romilda the frog. Mantova: Maurizio Corraini. 1997.
- The lorry driver. London: Harvill Press. 1945.
- Bruno Books. Harvill Press: London; printed in Italy. 1953. Compilation of What I'd like to be; The Lorry driver; and Georgie has lost his cap.
- Animals for sale. Mantova: Maurizio Corraini. 2004.
- From Afar it was an Island, Maurizio Corraini s.r.l. 2006
- Bruno Munari: From Afar It Is An Island, Emme Edizioni, Milan, 1971
- Drawing the sun
- Drawing a tree
- Movo: modelli volanti e parti staccate – Grafitalia (1940)
- Mondo aria acqua terra – (1940)
- Le macchine di Munari – Einaudi (1942)
- Abecedario di Munari – Einaudi (1942)
- Scatola di architettura – Castelletti (1945)
- Mai contenti – Mondadori (1945)
- L'uomo del camion – Mondadori (1945)
- Toc toc – Mondadori (1945)
- Il prestigiatore verde – Mondadori (1945)
- Storie di tre uccellini – Mondadori (1945)
- Il venditore di animali – Mondadori (1945)
- Gigi cerca il suo berretto – Mondadori (1945)
- Che cos'è l'orologio – Editrice Piccoli (1947)
- Che cos'è il termometro – Editrice Piccoli (1947)
- Meo il gatto matto – Pirelli (1948)
- Acqua terra aria – Orlando Cibelli Editore (1952)
- Nella notte buia – Muggiani (1956)
- L'alfabetiere – Einaudi (1960)
- Bruno Munari's ABC – World Publishing Company (1960)
- Bruno Munari's Zoo – World Publishing Company (1963)
- La torta in cielo – Einaudi (1966)
- Nella nebbia di Milano – Emme edizioni (1968)
- Da lontano era un'isola – Emme edizioni (1971)
- L'uccellino Tic Tic, con Emanuele Luzzati – Einaudi (1972)
- Cappuccetto Verde – Einaudi (1972)
- Cappuccetto Giallo – Einaudi (1972)
- Dove andiamo?, con Mari Carmen Diaz – Emme edizioni (1973)
- Un fiore con amore – Einaudi (1973)
- Un paese di plastica, con Ettore Maiotti – Einaudi (1973)
- Rose nell'insalata – Einaudi (1974)
- Pantera nera, con Franca Capalbi – Einaudi (1975)
- L'esempio dei grandi, con Florenzio Corona – Einaudi (1976)
- Il furbo colibrì, con Paola Bianchetto – Einaudi (1977)
- Disegnare un albero – Zanichelli (1977)
- Disegnare il sole – Zanichelli (1980)
- I prelibri (12 libri) – Danese (1980)
- Cappuccetto Rosso Verde Giallo Blu e Bianco – Einaudi (1981)
- Tantagente – The Museum of Modern Art (1983)
- Il merlo ha perso il becco, con Giovanni Belgrano – Danese (1987)
- La favola delle favole – Publi-Paolini (1994)
- La rana Romilda – Corraini (1997)
- Il prestigiatore giallo – Corraini (1997)
- Buona notte a tutti – Corraini (1997)
- Cappuccetto bianco – Corraini (1999)

== Munari's research books ==
- Libri illeggibili – Libreria Salto (1949)
- Libro illeggibile n. 8 – (1951)
- Libro illeggibile n. 12 – (1951)
- Libro illeggibile n. 15 – (1951)
- Libro illeggibile – (1952)
- An unreadable quadrat-print – Hilversum (1953)
- Sei linee in movimento – (1958)
- Libro illeggibile n. XXV – (1959)
- Libro illeggibile con pagine intercambiabili – (1960)
- Libro illeggibile n. 25 – (1964)
- Libro illeggibile 1966 – Galleria dell'Obelisco (1966)
- Libro illeggibile N.Y.1 – The Museum of Modern Art (1967)
- Guardiamoci negli occhi – Giorgio Lucini editore (1970)
- Libro illeggibile MN1 – Corraini (1984)
- La regola e il caso – Mano (1984)
- I negativi-positivi 1950 – Corraini (1986)
- Munari 80 a un millimetro da me – Scheiwiller (1987)
- Libro illeggibile MN1 – Corraini (1988)
- Libro illeggibile 1988-2 – Arcadia (1988)
- Simultaneità degli opposti – Corraini (1989)
- Alta tensione – Vismara Arte (1990)
- Libro illeggibile NA-1 – Beppe Morra (1990)
- Strappo alla regola – (1990)
- Amici della Sincron – Galleria Sincron (1991)
- Rito segreto – Laboratorio 66 (1991)
- Metamorfosi delle plastiche – Triennale di Milano (1991)
- Alla faccia! Esercizi di stile – Corraini (1992)
- Libro illeggibile MN3. Luna capricciosa – Corraini (1992)
- Saluti e baci. Esercizi di evasione – Corraini (1992)
- Viaggio nella fantasia – Corraini (1992)
- Pensare confonde le idee – Corraini (1992)
- Aforismi riciclati – Pulcinoelefante (1991)
- Verbale scritto – il melangolo (1992)
- Fenomeni bifronti – Etra/Arte (1993)
- Libro illeggibile MN4 – Corraini (1994)
- Tavola tattile – Alpa Magicla (1994)
- Mostra collettiva di Bruno Munari – Corraini (1994)
- Adulti e bambini in zone inesplorate – Corraini (1994)
- Contanti affettuosissimi auguri – NodoLibri (1994)
- Aforismi – Pulcinoelefante (1994)
- Libro illeggibile MN5 – Corraini (1995)
- Il mare come artigiano – Corraini (1995)
- Emozioni – Corraini (1995)
- A proposito di torroni – Pulcinoelefante (1996)
- Prima del disegno – Corraini (1996)
- Ma chi è Bruno Munari? – Corraini (1996)
- Segno & segno – Etra/arte (1996)

== Munari's other books ==
- In the Darkness of the Night: A Bruno Munari Artist's Book. Princeton Architectural Press. 2017. First published in 1956.
- Speak Italian: The Fine Art of the Gesture. Chronicle Books. 2005. First published in 1958.
- Design As Art. Penguin Classics. 1966.
- Square, Circle, Triangle. Princeton Architectural Press. First published in 1976.

== Major exhibitions ==
- 1954 Olivetti: Design in Industry. "Munari's Slides," used as an example of his pitture proiettate (1952–54; co-curated by Bruno Munari).
- 1986 A Bruno Munari Retrospective. Palazzo Reale, Milan, Italy
- 1989 A Bruno Munari Retrospective. Museum of Jerusalem, Israel
- 1995 Museum für Gestaltung, Zurich, Switzerland
- 1995 Retrospective, Museo di Cantù, Italy
- 1997 Bruno Munari Instalace, Museum of Modern Art, Klatovy Gallery, Klenova (Czech Republic)
- 2004 Tinguely e Munari. Opere in azione, Museo La Spezia, Italy
- 2007 Bruno Munari, Rotonda della Besana, Milan, Italy
- 2008 Bruno Munari, The Museum of the Ara Pacis, Rome, Italy
- 2012 Bruno Munari: My Futurist Past. Estorick Collection of Modern Italian Art, London, UK.
- 2022 Bruno Munari, Fundación Juan March, Madrid Spain

== Awards and recognitions ==
- Compasso d'Oro award from the ADI (Associazione per il Disegno Industriale) (1954, 1955, 1979)
- Golden medal of the Triennale di Milano for the "Libri illeggibili" book (1957)
- Andersen award as best child author (1974)
- Honourable mention from the New York Science Academy (1974)
- Graphic award in the Bologna Fair for the childhood (1984)
- Award from the Japan Design Foundation, for the intense human value of his design (1985)
- Lego award for his exceptional contributions to the development of creativity for children (1986)
- Award from Accademia dei Lincei for his graphic work (1988)
- Award Spiel Gut of Ulm (1971, 1973, 1987)
- Honoris causa in architettura from the Genova University (1989)
- ADCI Milan Hall of Fame in Creativity and Communication (1990)
- Marconi award of the Brera Academy (1992)
- Cavaliere di Gran Croce (1994)
- Honourable partnership of Harvard University

== Major collections and holdings ==
- Collezione Miroslava Hajek, Novara, Italy
- Collezione Fondazione Danese-Vodoz, Milan, Italy
- Collezione Angelo & Silvia Calmarini, Milan, Italy
- Collezione Massimo & Sonia Cirulli Archive, New York
- Collezione Dabbeni, Lugano, Switzerland
- Collezione Bruno Munari. Museo Galleria del Design e dell’Arredamento, Milan, Italy.
- Fondazione Casaperlarte, Cantù, Italy
- Fondo Munari CSAC, University of Parma, Italy
- Museum of Modern Art, New York
- Museo d'arte MAGA di Gallarate (VA)
- MART – Museo di arte moderna e contemporanea di Trento e Rovereto (Provincia di Trento)

== See also ==
- Industrial Design
- List of notable industrial designers
- Futurism
