= Rebo (comics) =

Disney comics character

Rebo in Saturn against the Earth

Rebo is an Italian comics character, created for the story Saturno contro la Terra (Saturn against the Earth) by Cesare Zavattini (plot), Federico Pedrocchi (script) and Giovanni Scolari (art) in 1936. He is the dictator of Saturn and wants to conquer Earth, but his plans are foiled by Dr. Marcus and Ciro.

In 1960, Carlo Chendi and Luciano Bottaro decided to reuse the character in Disney comics: Rebo made his Disney debut in Paperino e il razzo interplanetario (Donald Duck and the interplanetary rocket), in Topolino #230-232 (March 1960), in which he tries to conquer Jupiter but his plans fail thanks to Donald. In the 1990s, Luciano Bottaro created another three stories about Rebo and his attempts to conquer Earth and Jupiter.

== Saturn against the Earth ==
Saturn against the Earth (Saturno contro la Terra) was a comics series created by Zavattini, Pedrocchi and Scolari. This saga was published in installments in the weeklies I tre porcellini (1936–1937), Topolino (1937–1938), Donald Duck and Other Adventures (Paperino e altre avventure) (1940) and then back to Topolino (1941-1946). In 1940 the first episodes of the saga were published in the United States in the comic book Future Comics. It was the first Italian comics story published in the United States.

In this saga Rebo, the dictator of Saturn, is a cruel leader, an outright representation of evil, whose crest resembles the feared dragons of antiquity. He allies with the Earthman Leducq in order to conquer Earth, but his invasion fails thanks to Earth scientist Dr. Marcus and his assistants Ciro and Bastiano ("Saturno contro la Terra" (Saturn against the Earth)), and Rebo is killed. The saga continues with the resurrection of Rebo thanks to the Saturn scientist Netro in "Rebo ritorna" (Rebo returns), and the subsequent episodes The War of the Planets (La Guerra dei Pianeti), Rebo's Shadow (L'Ombra di Rebo), The Ice Cloud (La Nube di Gelo), The Fire Sources (Sorgenti di Fuoco) and The Air Sphere (La Sfera d'Aria). After Rebo's change of heart and the rapprochement between Saturn and Earth, the villain's role falls on the evil scientist, Netro, who hatches a plan to shatter the whole Earth. The series ended in 1946 with the last episode, The End of the World (La Fine del Mondo).

Chapter listing

1. Saturno contro la Terra: I tre porcellini #93-98 (Dec 31, 1936 - Feb 4, 1937) -- continued in Topolino #216-238 (Feb 11-July 15, 1937)
2. Rebo ritorna / L'isola di sabbia: Topolino #239-268 (July 22, 1937 - Feb 10, 1938)
3. La guerra dei pianeti: Topolino #269-294 (Feb 17-Aug 11, 1938)
4. L'ombra di Rebo: Topolino #295-307 (Aug 18-Nov 10, 1938)
5. La nube di gelo (continuation of "L'ombra di Rebo"): Paperino #122-142 (Apr 25-Sept 7, 1940)
6. Le sorgenti di fuoco: Paperino #143-149 (Sept 14-Oct 26, 1940) -- continued in Topolino #468-489 (Dec 2, 1941 - April 28, 1942)
7. La sfera d'aria: Topolino #560-564 (Sept 7-Dec 21, 1943) -- continued after a break in Topolino #565-587 (Dec 15, 1945 - May 18, 1946)
8. La fine del mondo: Topolino #588-610 (May 25-Oct 26, 1946)

== Disney stories ==
Disney version of Rebo

In 1960 Italian Disney comics artists Carlo Chendi (script) and Luciano Bottaro (art) created a story, Paperino e il razzo interplanetario (Donald Duck and the interplanetary rocket), in which Rebo made his debut in Disney comics. In this story Rebo is the farcical dictator of Saturn, whose population was reduced (because of war) to a total of three (Rebo and his two helpers). Rebo wants to conquer Jupiter. When he finds out that the famous inventor Gyro Gearloose is on Jupiter with Donald Duck, Scrooge McDuck and Huey, Dewey and Louie, he decides to kidnap him to force him to create fighting robots. Unfortunately his helpers mistake Donald Duck for Gyro, so they kidnap him. Donald Duck is forced by Rebo to create fighting robots, but thanks to Donald's inability, they are ineffective so the invasion of Jupiter fails. Donald escapes and returns to Jupiter where he is celebrated as a hero by Jupiter's inhabitants.

In 1995, Luciano Bottaro decided to create new adventures about Rebo. In 1995 he created Paperino e il ritorno di Rebo (Donald Duck and the return of Rebo) in which Rebo tries to conquer Earth but his plans fail thanks to Donald and Scrooge. Bottaro made other two stories about Rebo, Alla ricerca del papero virtuale (Finding the virtual duck, 1995) and Paperino e l'invasione di Giove (Donald Duck and the invasion of Jupiter, 1997). In the Invasion of Jupiter, Bottaro reused Zantaf, a mad scientist appeared in the 1970s in some MIA (McDuck Intelligence Agency, in Italian PIA) stories. In this story Zantaf allied with Rebo.

In 2010, the four Disney stories about Rebo were republished in the volume Tesori #7: Paperino contro Saturno (Treasures #7: Donald Duck against Saturn).

In the USA, the first two of Bottaro's Rebo stories were published in the Fantagraphics Books collection Disney Masters Vol. 2, "Uncle Scrooge's Money Rocket". The second two followed in Disney Masters Vol. 16, "Donald Duck in Jumpin' Jupiter".
