= Alex Bertani =

Italian editor

Alex Bertani is an Italian editor who is the current director of the Italian comic book series Topolino (since 2018). Previously he worked for Panini Comics.

== Biography ==
With a degree in economics, he was hired by the Italian office of Marvel Comics in 1994, working in a variety of roles.

In 2016, he began directing "Mercato Italiano Publishing." Then in October 2018 he was nominated to become editorial director of Topolini, succeeding Valentina De Poli.
