= Donald Duck and Other Adventures =

1937–1940 Italian Disney comics magazine

Donald Duck and Other Adventures (Italian: Paperino e altre avventure), also known as Paperino giornale, is a 1937–40 weekly Italian Disney comics magazine published by Mondadori. The comic was launched by Federico Pedrocchi, Mondadori's art director, as a companion to the existing weekly Topolino (Mickey Mouse) magazine. Paperino published 149 issues from 30 December 1937 to 26 October 1940, at which point it was merged with Topolino.

The eight-page newspaper published the first Italian Donald Duck comic book story, "Paolino Paperino e il mistero di Marte" ("Donald Duck and the Secret of Mars"), which was written and drawn by Pedrocchi, and serialized in 18 one-page installments. Pedrocchi wrote eight serials starring Disney characters for the paper, featuring Donald Duck, Goofy and the characters from Snow White and the Seven Dwarfs. During the same period, he also wrote two further Disney stories which were printed in Mondadori's biweekly publication Albi d'oro.

Paperino also published non-Disney adventure comics from the United States, including Popeye, Buck Rogers, Ella Cinders and Tarzan, along with non-Disney comics created by Pedrocchi and others. In 1938, when the fascist Mussolini government ordered publishers to stop publishing American creations, Paperino dropped its American comics, except for Donald Duck; the Ministry's order made an exception for Disney comics.

== Origin ==
Pedrocchi, a former novelist and advertising illustrator, joined Mondadori in 1936. At the time, Al Taliaferro's Donald Duck comic strip was being reprinted in several of Mondadori's publications, including Topolino, I Tre Porcellini and Nel Regno di Topolino, and Pedrocchi thought that Donald was appealing enough to anchor his own magazine.

Pedrocchi's pitch to Mondadori in 1937 said:

"This newspaper is obviously aimed at... kids... who like adventure. It is therefore advisable to give as much space as possible to the adventure stories, leaving only Disney for the comic part, that is PAOLINO PAPERINO which is appreciated by little ones, boys and families. In any case, supporting the newspaper only on PAOLINO PAPERINO as an infallible element of appeal, I do not think it is sufficient: it must be the stories, indeed, it is good that there is even an exceptional story that is advertisable to publicity along with the name PAOLINO PAPERINO, and it is good that it is a story whose title is the name of a character. Example: PAOLINO PAPERINO, the new children's magazine, launches the great hero of the 1000 adventures ZORRO DELLA METROPOLI..."

In each issue, the front page contained either the latest episode of a Donald Duck story, or (for six months in 1938–39) a set of Taliaferro's Donald Duck daily comic strips. When Pedrocchi started writing comics about Goofy and Snow White characters, they were printed on the back page.

Pedrocchi was influenced by Taliaferro's strip, and some of the character poses in Pedrocchi's stories are copied from Donald Duck. But the settings were different: Taliaferro's strip takes place in US suburbia, while Pedrocchi's Donald lives in urban Milan, where the magazine was published. "Paperino" also lives on his own, with no sign of three little nephews.

== Disney stories ==
Federico Pedrocchi wrote eight Disney comics stories for Paperino e altre avventure between 1937 and 1940, and two stories for Albi d'oro in 1938 and 1939. All ten are described below, in chronological order.

=== Donald Duck and the Secret of Mars ===
Paolino Paperino e il mistero di Marte (Donald Duck and the Secret of Mars) was published in 18 parts, from issue #1 to 18 (30 December 1937 – 28 April 1938). The story was written and drawn by Federico Pedrocchi. The story was reprinted as a full 17-page story in the biweekly Nel regno di Topolino #57 (25 April 1938).

While some cite this story as the first-ever Donald Duck comic book story, that distinction actually goes to William A. Ward's Donald and Donna, which premiered seven months earlier in the UK magazine Mickey Mouse Weekly in issue #67 (15 May 1937).

Having lost the key to his house, Donald Duck falls asleep on a park bench. When a policeman wakes him, he inadvertently smacks the cop, and then runs away. Two sinister strangers see him fleeing from the law, and drive him away. Dr. Kraus and his assistant, Baus-Baus, have built a rocket they plan to pilot to Mars, and they need a third person on their voyage. Thinking that the police are on his trail, Donald agrees, and they lift off. After destroying oncoming chunks of ice from a comet's tail, Donald accidentally breaks the helmets of the team's spacesuits, and Baus-Baus locks him up in a storage room. Donald finds a journal written by Captain Bluff, who set off on a journey to Mars forty years earlier. The spaceship lands on Mars, and Donald is sent out first to make sure the air is breathable. He's picked up a group of gangly cat-faced Pindos, who carry him to their leader, Chief Bluff. Thrilled to see another Earthling, Bluff reveals that he was tricked by Dr. Kraus into traveling to Mars decades ago, to discover the secret of the Pindos' power. Dr. Kraus takes charge of the Pindos' big, monkey-faced enemies, the Pondos, who invade the Pindos' stronghold. Donald is thrown down the stairs to the basement, where he finds the "Room of the Sun", the true source of the Martians' power. By standing in a concentration of solar energy, Donald temporarily gains super-strength, and fights off the Pondos single-handedly. He chases Kraus and Baus-Baus into their spaceship, which crashes into Bluff's palace, destroying the Room of the Sun and ending the threat that unscrupulous people would use the Pindos' secret power. Donald's boost of strength wears off, and he and Bluff pilot the ship back to Earth, taking Kraus and Baus-Baus as prisoners. Back on Earth, Donald is given a reward for apprehending the wanted criminals, but gets fined an equal amount for assaulting an officer, leaving him with nothing.

The art in this first Paperino story was influenced by Taliaferro's Donald Duck comic strip—in fact, Donald's pose in the fourth panel of the first strip, jumping on the park bench trying to chase away an imaginary mosquito, is taken directly from Taliaferro's first Donald Duck Silly Symphony Sunday comic strip of 30 August 1936. Comics historian Alberto Becattini also sees sci-fi influences: "There were also clear references to Dick Calkins' Buck Rogers—which was, by the way, one of the regular features in Paperino—and to Alex Raymond's Flash Gordon, as far as the spaceships and the alien landscapes were concerned. Pedrocchi himself was quite familiar with science fiction plots, having been writing and laying out an s.f. series, "Saturn Against the Earth", since 1936."

Becattini and David Gerstein also point out Pedrocchi's debt to Floyd Gottfredson's Mickey Mouse comic strip, which was running in Paperino's sister paper, Topolino: "Like Mickey in 'His Horse Tanglefoot' (1933), a naïve Donald is tricked into helping the bad guys. As in Gottfredson's 'Island in the Sky' (1937), the villain's quest for a scientific secret ultimately leads to his destruction. And as in 'Mickey Mouse Sails for Treasure Island' (1932), a long-missing sailor is discovered ruling a lost world... As the art director of his country's Disney editions, however, Pedrocchi was professional enough to absorb more than just story details. He also taught himself how Gottfredson structured a Disney adventure: with character-based plot threads that built upon one another, dovetailing together neatly in the end."

=== Donald Duck, Special Correspondent ===
"Paolino Paperino inviato speciale" ("Donald Duck, Special Correspondent") was published in 30 parts, from issue #19 to 48 (5 May – 24 November 1938). The story was written and drawn by Federico Pedrocchi. It was reprinted as a full 30-page story in the monthly Albi d'oro #21 (Sept. 1938).

At the start of this story, Donald bumps into an old friend, Peter Pig (called Meo Porcello), from Donald's first cartoon, the 1934 Silly Symphony short The Wise Little Hen. Peter remains Donald's sidekick through the next adventure as well, "Donald Duck Among the Redskins", and also makes an appearance in "Donald Duck, Fortune Teller".

Leaving the police station at the end of the previous story, Donald is approached by Lucius Linotype (Signor Linotipi), editor of the newspaper Another World (L'altro mondo). He hires Donald and Peter as reporters and sends them to war-torn Selvania, where they must take a picture of General Sweet (Generale Miele), who's never been photographed. On the road to Selvania, the boys meet another reporter, Bart Caterwaul (Bartolomeo Circonlocuzioni), also known as "the Cat", from rival paper The Old Globe (Mondo intero). He pretends to befriend them, but when they get to the Selvanian border, the Cat tells a soldier that Donald and Peter are spies from Selvania's enemy, Marinzia. After a disastrous trial, Donald and Peter are sentenced to be executed, but they manage to get a telegram to Mr. Linotype, who arrives in an airplane just in time to explain things to the authorities. The Cat continues to sabotage Donald and Peter's efforts to get to the front lines and photograph General Sweet, but Donald gets in the way of the Cat's photo, and a picture of the duck is printed in The Old Globe as the general. The rival paper is humiliated, but the Cat uses the opportunity to trick the Marinzians into capturing Donald, thinking that he's General Sweet. Donald pretends to be Sweet, and tricks the Marinzian's General Sour (Generale Fiele) into attacking at a strong point in the Selvanian defenses. Peter hears the real Sweet promising the Cat a photo, and sneaks across enemy lines to tell Donald. Furious, Donald steals a plane, kidnaps Sour, and brings him to Selvania. The war over, Donald and the Cat both rush back to their newspapers with a photograph of the general. The Cat's paper publishes first, but still gets a pic of the wrong man; Donald's paper gets a shot of the real General Sweet, and Linotype rewards Donald and Peter for their service.

=== Salesman Goofy ===
"Pippo viaggiatore di commercio" ("Salesman Goofy") was published in 9 parts, from issue #40 to 48 (29 Sept. – 24 Nov 1938). The story was drawn by Enrico Pinochi. The story was reprinted as a full 17-page story in the biweekly Nel regno di Topolino #72 (25 December 1938).

In the story, Goofy is hired by the Rosatea perfume company. A jealous rival tries to trick Goofy into switching the normal bottles with bottles made of unbreakable glass, and Goofy ends up breaking all of the bottles to prove they're the right ones.

This "Pippo" (Goofy) story premiered in issue #40, replacing the American strip Ella Cinders as the American content was being phased out. Pedrocchi was hoping to produce another comic headlined by a Disney character, Il Giornale di Pippo, and created a dummy mockup of the first issue. The final panel in the last part has the word "Continua..." ("To be continued..."), presumably a lead-in to the proposed Pippo paper, which never materialized.

There was a six-month gap from Paperino #49 to #71 (November 1938 to May 1939) without a Pedrocchi-written Disney story. During this period, Pedrocchi wrote two stories published in Albi d'Oro—"Donald Duck and the Philosopher's Stone" and "Clarabelle in the Claws of the Black Devil"—while the front page of Paperino was filled with American Donald Duck comic strips.

=== Donald Duck and the Philosopher's Stone ===
"Paperino e la pietra filosofale" ("Donald Duck and the Philosopher's Stone") was published as a 28-page story in Albi d'oro #22/1938 (15 October 1938). This story was the first Donald Duck comic story intended as a full-length adventure, rather than for serialization. The story was the third and last Disney story with Pedrocchi as both writer and artist.

Donald inherits a gigantic, complicated machine from his late uncle Paolo Paperis, which is supposed to turn rocks into gold. Uncle Paolo's faithful butler Socrate shows Donald the machine, which is kept in the dungeons of Paolo's mansion. Donald needs to load the machine with rocks, and then use the fabled philosopher's stone, which is buried in the garden. Donald ultimately discovers that Socrate is actually Paolo in disguise, who wanted to test his nephew.

The Italian Disney Comic Guide blog comments, "The stock moralistic ending of the so-called Socrate would risk confining the story to the list of stories for the little ones if it were not for the timely Donaldesque reaction to the forced life lesson."

=== Clarabelle in the Black Devil's clutches ===
"Clarabella fra gli artigli del diavolo nero" ("Clarabelle in the Black Devil's clutches") was published as a 26-page story in Albi d'oro #25/1939 (15 April 1939). The story was drawn by Enrico Pinochi.

Horace Horsecollar (Orazio Cavezza) and Clarabelle Cow (Clarabella) work at a luxury hotel, where there's a series of mysterious thefts committed by the "Black Devil". Assisting with the investigation, they end up getting kidnapped by the thief, Fagnocco the cook, and taken on board a smuggling ship. Fagnocco turns out to be Peg-Leg Pete (Pietro Gambadilegno), who was disguised with a fake mustache. Clarabelle saves the day, and at the end of the story, Horace proposes marriage to Clarabelle. While often romantically linked, Horace and Clarabelle have never tied the knot in Disney comics published in any other countries.

Pinochi swiped most of the art for this story from the Mickey Mouse adventures "Race for Riches" (1935), "The Pirate Submarine" (1935–36) and "Dr. Oofgay's Secret Serum" (1934).

=== Donald Duck Among the Redskins ===
Original stories returned to Paperino e altre avventure with "Paperino fra i pellirosse" ("Donald Duck Among the Redskins"), published in 29 parts from issue #72 to 100 (11 May – 23 November 1939). The story was drawn by Enrico Pinochi. The story was reprinted as a full 29-page story in the monthly Albi d'oro #33 (December 1939).

Mr. Linotype sends Donald and Peter on another assignment, this time to report on a tribe of Indians who live in a hidden valley. The Cat, now a tax collector trying to collect from the Indians, follows them and tries to take advantage. There are two rival tribes in the valley, and Donald and Peter try to end the war between them.

=== Snow White and Basilisk the Wizard ===
At the same time that original Donald Duck stories began to appear on the front page of Paperino, a Pedrocchi-written Snow White story took over the back page. "Biancaneve e il mago Basilisco" ("Snow White and Basilisk the Wizard") was published in 29 parts, from issue #72 to 100 (11 May – 23 November 1939). The story was "drawn in a baroque, sometimes surreal style" by artist Nino Pagot. It was reprinted as a full 29-page story in the biweekly Nel regno di Topolino #92 (25 November 1939).

The evil wizard Basilisk (Mago Basilisco) kidnaps the child of Snow White and Prince Charming. Snow White discovers that the sorcerer is living in the castle that belonged to the Evil Queen, and the prince goes to rescue the child, but he is blinded by Basilisk's magic gaze. The Seven Dwarfs help Snow White to rescue the child from the sorcerer's gorilla servants, and they annihilate the wizard by rolling an avalanche of boulders to crush him. When the wizard dies, his castle crumbles.

This story continues the comics adaptation of Snow White and the Seven Dwarfs by Merrill De Maris, Hank Porter and Bob Grant, created in the United States for the Silly Symphony Sunday comic strip. The 20-part adaptation was translated into Italian and printed in Topolino #265–284 (20 Jan. – 2 June 1938), and collected in Nel regno di Topolino #66 (25 Sept. 1938). Pedrocchi's sequel makes reference to the Prince's imprisonment in the Queen's dungeons, a subplot that appeared in the comic strips but not in the original movie.

The Italian Disney Comic Guide blog comments, "For the Seven Dwarfs, Pagot's models are obviously those already available, in fact the schematism and repetitiveness of their poses is a limit. But the best job is the one on the environments, fully enjoyable only in the first edition: the influences from contemporary déco inspirations can be guessed, as in the initial sequence on the waters of the enchanted lake. The hybrid Mago Basilisco is a completely new authorial creation, devilish and with a body similar to that of a wolf. An unironic incarnation of pure Evil, he literally dies at the end of the story, crushed by an avalanche of boulders so much that his black soul soars in the air for a few seconds before heading to Hell."

Mago Basilisco appeared later in Luciano Bottaro's 1966 story "Paperin Furioso", a parody of the Italian epic poem Orlando Furioso published in Topolino #544–545 (1–8 May 1966).

=== Donald Duck, Fortune Teller ===
"Paperino chiromante" ("Donald Duck, Fortune Teller") was published in 30 parts, from issue #101 to 130 (30 November 1939 – 13 June 1940). The story was drawn by Enrico Pinochi. The story was reprinted as a full 26-page story in the monthly Albi d'oro #37 (April 1940).

In the story, Donald sets up a fortune telling tent, with Goofy as his assistant. Peter Pig and "the Cat" appear in small roles, and the cast also includes Horace, Clarabelle, Peg-Leg Pete and Eli Squinch (Eli Squick).

Horace and Clarabelle Cow are depicted in this story as married, following on from his proposal in "Clarabelle in the Claws of the Black Devil".

Disney Comic Guide points out, "The plot anticipates some thirty years, more or less, that of 'Donald Duck, Wizard of Duckburg' ('Paperino stregone di Paperopoli', 1967) of Rodolfo Cimino and Giulio Chierchini, but the latter will be a story of very different depth and foresight."

=== The Seven Bad Dwarves Against the Seven Good Dwarfs ===
"I Sette Nani cattivi contro i Sette Nani buoni" ("The Seven Bad Dwarves Against the Seven Good Dwarfs") was published in 21 parts, from issue #101 to 130 (30 November 1939 – 13 June 1940). The story continued the Snow White adventures printed on the magazine's back page, and was drawn by Nino Pagot.

In the story, Dopey (Cucciolo) has disappeared, and Grumpy (Brontolo) and Doc (Dotto) set off to search for him. They're taken prisoner in the realm of King Severo, where they learn that Dopey was kidnapped by the Seven Bad Dwarfs, who want to take the diamond mine from their Good counterparts. The Bad Dwarfs' underground country is accessed through a hollow tree trunk. The Good Dwarfs triumph by diverting water through the Bad Dwarfs' caves, flushing them out and into the sunlight.

This story introduces the Seven Bad Dwarves: Furbicchio, Sibilo, Maligno, Mastiff, Ricino, Spinaccio and Cipiglio. Alberto Becattini translates the names into English as Wily, Hiss, Malicious, Mastiff, Castor Oil, Bramble and Scowl.

Disney Comic Guide comments, "The deformed and memorable Seven Bad Dwarfs... represent the dark side of the mythology of the Dwarfs, so much so that the adventure can be characterized as a sibylline descent into the unconscious of the protagonist Dwarfs, with the congenital muteness of Cucciolo as a further signal of impotence of the protagonists before being able to resurface in the world kissed by light, where the word (= intelligence) has finally, a way to express one's power in the face of the brute forces to be sedated."

The Bad Dwarfs returned to Italian comics in four stories written from 1960 to 1966, often in the service of the Evil Queen. The first was "The Seven Dwarfs and the Christmas Spell" ("I Sette Nani e l'incantesimo di Natale") in Almanacco Topolino #48 (Dec 1960). The fourth story was Paperin furioso, Luciano Bottaro's parody of Orlando Furioso in Topolino #544 (May 1966), which also included the Mago Basilico from Pedrocchi's first Snow White story. They were also revived in the mid-70s to mid-80s in Brazilian comics, in eight stories printed in O Pato Donald, Mickey and Tio Patinhas.

=== Donald Duck and the Chinese Vase ===
"Paperino e il vaso cinese" ("Donald Duck and the Chinese Vase") was published in 19 parts, from issue #131 to 149 (27 June – 26 October 1940). The story was drawn by Enrico Pinochi.

In the story, Donald reads that Count Baffirossi (Count Red Mustache) is offering ten thousand lire to detectives who can recover his stolen Chinese vase. Donald and Goofy set up a detective agency in front of the Count's house, and Donald puffs enough hot air about being expert detectives that Baffirossi agrees to a hundred thousand lire. They find suspicious fingerprints on the column that held the vase, and discover they belong to the cook, who quit recently. When the investigators go to the cook's house, her fierce husband chases them away. They convince the Count to buy a second vase, to lure the thief into returning—and the thief does, taking the second vase while Donald and Goofy are sleeping nearby. Donald accidentally finds the thief in the cellar the next morning—it's the cook's husband, an alcoholic who stole the vase to drain the Count's wine caskets. Both vases have smashed, and Donald and Goofy try to put them back together. The police lieutenant Sbronzini hears the cook's husband admit that he's the thief, and takes credit for the capture. Donald and Goofy manage to reassemble the vases, as the cook begs the Count for clemency. The Count agrees not to press charges if the cook comes back to work for him, and then gives the hundred thousand lire to Donald and Goofy.

Pinochi's artwork is heavily traced from Gottfredson's Mickey Mouse comic strip story "The Seven Ghosts", with Count Baffirossi as a double for Gottfredson's Colonel Bassett.

== Non-Disney stories ==
These stories also appeared in Paperino e altre avventure:

=== Italian comics ===
- Will Sparrow by Luigi Cordero & Kurt Caesar: #1-44
- Zorro Della Metropoli by Cesare Zavattini, G. Martina & Walter Molino: #1-16
- Il Corsaro Nero by D. Natoli, Rino Albertarelli & Walter Molino: #17-77
- Luciano Serra Pilota by Amedeo Martini & Walter Molino: #56-79
- Kit Carson by Federico Pedrocchi & Walter Molino: #80-133
- Capitan L'Audace by Federico Pedrocchi & Walter Molino: #91-149
- Saturno contro la Terra by Federico Pedrocchi & Giovanni Scolari : #122-149
- Aeroporto Z by Federico Pedrocchi & Kurt Caesar: issues #124-149

=== American comics ===
- Buck Rogers (Elio Fiamma) by Dick Calkins & Rick Yager: #1-40
- Ming Foo (La Rondine dei Mari) by Brandon Walsh & Nicholas Afonsky: #1-37
- Popeye (Braccio di Ferro) by Elzie Segar: #1-40
- Ella Cinders (Ella Parella) by Bill Conselman & Charles Plumb: #25-39
- Tarzan by Burne Hogarth: #112-133
- Tim Tyler's Luck (Mario e Furio) by Lyman Young & Nat Edson: #134-149

== Cancellation ==
The 1938 Ministry of Popular Culture decree that magazines had to stop publishing American-created content put pressure on both Topolino and Paperino, which had to fill the void with more Italian-created content. (After dropping Buck Rogers, Ella Cinders, Ming Foo and Popeye in 1938, Paperino did introduce one American-produced page in February 1940, first presenting Tarzan and then Tim Tyler's Luck.) After Paperino issue #149 (26 October 1940), the magazine was absorbed into Topolino.

The three artists that worked on Paperino's Disney-related comics never drew Disney characters again after the paper closed. Federico Pedrocchi continued to write and work as art director for Topolino, but only on non-Disney stories. Enrico Pinochi became a full-time illustrator, and later moved to Argentina. Nino Pagot set up an animation studio with his brother Toni, and left the field.

== Legacy ==
Rebo, the Saturnian dictator from Pedrocchi's Saturno contro la Terra (Saturn Conquers the Earth), returned to Disney comics in a March 1960 story by Carlo Chendi and Luciano Bottaro: "Paperino e il razzo interplanetario" ("Donald Duck and the interplanetary rocket"), in Topolino #230-232, in which Donald foils his plans to conquer Jupiter. Bottaro also wrote and drew three more stories featuring Rebo in 1995 and 1997.

== Reprints ==
=== Italy ===
As noted above, six of the eight Paperino e altre avventure stories were reprinted shortly after their serialization, as complete stories in the biweekly Nel Regno di Topolino or the monthly Albi d'oro. Both magazines ended publication in 1940, so the final two Paperino stories ("The Seven Bad Dwarfs Against the Seven Good Dwarfs" and "Donald Duck and the Chinese Vase") were not reprinted in the pre-war books.

After the war, most of the stories were reprinted once in the restarted Albi d'oro between 1947 and 1954. Some were reprinted in Super Almanacco Paperino in the late 1970s, in Paperino Mese in 1989-1990, and in Zio Paperone and Le imperdibili between 2006 and 2008. The apparently unfinished "Salesman Goofy" is the least-reprinted of the Disney stories; it hasn't been published in an Italian comic since 1949. The two Pedrocchi stories from Albi d'oro were last reprinted in 1956.

In 1990 and 1991, the entire series of Paperino e altre avventure was reprinted, including the non-Disney strips, in six volumes by Comic Art as Paperino: Collana Grandi Ristampe.

=== United States ===
Only two of the Paperino stories have been reprinted in the United States.

"Donald Duck and the Secret of Mars" was reprinted in Gladstone Publishing's Donald Duck #286 (Sept 1994), translated by Fabio Gadducci, with dialogue by Bruce Hamilton & David Gerstein. It was also reprinted in 2012, with restored art and a new translation, in the Gottfredson collection Walt Disney's Mickey Mouse volume 3: High Noon at Inferno Gulch.

The second story, "Donald Duck, Special Correspondent", was reprinted in two parts in Boom! Studios' Donald Duck #364 and 365 (March–April 2011), translated by Gerstein.

=== Europe ===
The Paperino stories have also been reprinted rarely in other European countries. Some of the stories were reprinted in the Scandinavian countries between 1984 and 1988, "The Secret of Mars" was reprinted in France's Picsou Magazine in 2004, "Special Correspondent" in India's Donald Duck and Friends in 2012, and "Chinese Vase" in Germany's Die tollsten Geschichten von Donald Duck in 2016.

In Portugal, most of the Paperino stories were reprinted between 2015 and 2017 in Disney Big, Disney Hiper and Minnie & Amigos, except for "The Secret of Mars" and "Salesman Goofy". There are two stories that have only been reprinted in Portugal and Italy: "Donald Duck, Fortune Teller" and "The Seven Bad Dwarves Against the Seven Good Dwarfs".

"Donald Duck and the Philosopher's Stone", "Clarabelle in the Claws of the Black Devil" and "Salesman Goofy" have never been seen outside of Italy.
