= Alberto Mondadori =

Italian publisher, journalist and poet (1914–1976)

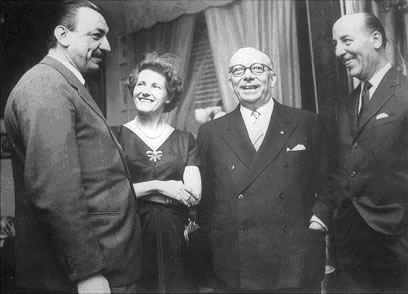
- Alberto Mondadori (left) with Nini Bompiani, his father Arnoldo and Valentino Bompiani
- Born: 8 December 1914; Ostiglia, Italy
- Died: 14 February 1976 (aged 61); Venice, Italy
- Occupations: Publisher, journalist, writer
- Spouse: Virginia Barella (m. 1941)
- Children: Fabrizio (1943–2021); Marco (1945–1999); Nicoletta (born 1947)
- Parent(s): Arnoldo Mondadori; Andreina Monicelli
- Relatives: Giorgio Mondadori (brother); Mario Monicelli (cousin)
- Awards: Viareggio Prize (1957)

Alberto Mondadori (8 December 1914 – 14 February 1976) was an Italian publisher, journalist, film director and poet. The eldest son of Arnoldo Mondadori, he founded the magazine Tempo and his own publishing house, Il Saggiatore, and co-created the paperback series Oscar Mondadori within his father's company.

== Biography ==
=== Early years and family ===
Mondadori was the first child of Arnoldo Mondadori, founder of the publishing house that bears his name, and Andreina Monicelli. He was the elder brother of Giorgio (1917–2009), Laura (1924–1991), and Cristina (1934–2015). He attended primary school in Verona up to the fourth grade, then moved with his family to Milan, where he completed primary school and enrolled first at the Liceo classico Giuseppe Parini and then at the Liceo Berchet. There he met the philosopher Remo Cantoni, who became a close friend. He attended courses at the Faculty of Political Science of the University of Pavia, but did not graduate.

In 1932, aged 18, Alberto Mondadori with a group of friends founded ‘Camminare’ magazine. The magazine addressed the social issues of the 1930s, anti-bourgeois debates, and the illusion of a new, revolutionary, and anti-capitalist form of fascism.

=== Cinema and Tempo ===
He joined the family company in 1927, at the age of 13, and stayed until he came of age in 1935. Between 1936 and 1937, he left Milan and moved first to Tirrenia, then to Rome, to pursue a career in cinema. He wrote and directed I ragazzi della via Paal, an adaptation of The Paul Street Boys, together with his cousin Mario Monicelli. In 1938 he founded his own production company in Rome, Montedoro Film, named after the nickname Gabriele D'Annunzio had given to Arnoldo, but it was not successful.

Returning to Milan, he devoted himself to journalism, founding and editing Tempo (1939), a current-affairs weekly printed in rotogravure with colour illustrations, the first of its kind in Italy, which was an immediate success. When the Second World War broke out in September 1939 he went abroad as a war correspondent, filing reports from Hungary, the Soviet Union and Germany between 1940 and 1943. In 1941 he returned to Italy to marry Virginia Barella, daughter of Giulio Barella, managing director of the newspaper Il Popolo d'Italia. The couple had three children: Fabrizio (1943–2021), Marco (1945–1999) and Nicoletta (born 1947).

On 8 September 1943 Tempo stopped publication following the occupation of northern Italy by German army. Mondadori sold the magazine to Aldo Palazzi in 1946.

=== Publishing and Il Saggiatore ===
After the war, having sold Tempo to the publisher Aldo Palazzi, Mondadori returned to the family firm in a management role. In 1950 he took part in the launch of the rotogravure weekly Epoca, serving as its first editor and giving it the editorial line that would become its hallmark: the utmost care for the quality of both text and images.

He also managed Mondadori's relations with its authors and founded many new book series, including Orientamenti, Biblioteca storica, Il pensiero critico, Biblioteca moderna Mondadori and Urania. He was one of the founders of the Casa della Cultura in Milan.

According to researcher Domenico Scarpa, the entire history of Alberto Mondadori's publishing career is a story of neurosis. He was in many ways ahead of his time, discovering books by young authors and not shying away from publishing openly provocative texts; he tried to distance himself as much as possible from his father's stance and views, while at the same time suffering deeply from his father's lack of approval.

From the start of World War II, the relationship between Alberto Mondadori and his father deteriorated. Alberto, who had developed strong anti-fascist convictions, insisted on the need for a radical shift that would openly position the Mondadori publishing house within the progressive political camp. Arnoldo, for his part, refused to take a clear political stance. This disagreement between father and son led Alberto to leave the family business in 1958 and found the publishing house Il Saggiatore. However, Il Saggiatore never became profitable and continued to rely on financial support from Arnoldo Mondadori and his publishing empire.

=== Later years ===
Starting in the late 1950s, his health worsened: due to his alcoholism, he was repeatedly forced to take time off work to undergo treatment at a clinic.

In 1965, together with Vittorio Sereni, he launched the paperback series Oscar Mondadori, personally selecting its first fifty titles. The series revolutionized the Italian book market and made an enormous contribution to the enlightenment of an entire generation.

In 1967 he ended his collaboration with the family company.

=== Writing ===
A writer and essayist, Mondadori also published four collections of poetry. With Quasi una vicenda he won the 1957 Viareggio Prize for poetry, jointly with Pier Paolo Pasolini and Sandro Penna.

=== Death and legacy ===
Alberto Mondadori died of a heart attack on 14 February 1976 in Venice, which he had chosen as his second home in his final years. The Fondazione Arnoldo e Alberto Mondadori was established in 1979 to preserve the memory of his work as a publisher.

== Honours ==
- Grand Officer of the Order of Merit of the Italian Republic (2 June 1969), on the proposal of the Presidency of the Council of Ministers.

== Works ==
- Quasi una vicenda, Mondadori, 1957 (poetry)
- Ho sognato il vostro tempo. Il mestiere dell'editore, Il Saggiatore, 2014

== Literature ==
- Ferretti, Gian Carlo (2011). "Mondadori, Alberto". Dizionario Biografico degli Italiani (in Italian). Vol. 75.
- Il cinquantennio editoriale di Arnoldo Mondadori 1907-1957. Verona: Arnoldo Mondadori. 1957.
- Mondadori, Sebastiano (2022). Verità di famiglia. Riscrivendo la storia di Alberto Mondadori. Milan: La Nave di Teseo. ISBN 978-88-346-1258-3.
- Bonsaver, Guido (2013). Mussolini censore: Storie di letteratura, dissenso e ipocrisia. Editori Laterza. ISBN 9788858109793.
- Scarpa, Domenico (1997-05-31). "Ritratto dell'editore da cucciolo". Belfagor. 52 (3): 303–316.
- Cadioli, Alberto; Vigini, Giuliano (2018). Storia dell'editoria in Italia dall'Unità a oggi. Milano: Editrice Bibliografica. p. 20. ISBN 9788893570053.
- Lascialfari, Riccardo (2002). "'Tempo.' Il settimanale illustrato di Alberto Mondadori 1939-1943" (PDF). Italia contemporanea. 228: 439–468.
