= Riccardo Castagnedi =

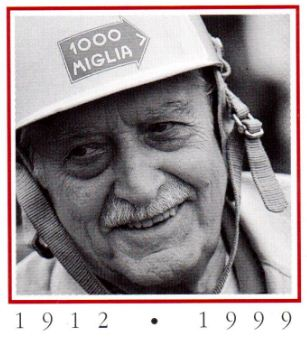
- Born: April 25, 1912; Colico, Italy
- Died: April 4, 1999 (aged 86); Genoa, Italy
- Resting place: Cimitero Maggiore di Milano, Milan, Italy
- Occupation(s): Artist, designer

Riccardo "Ricas" Castagnedi (April 25, 1912 in Colico – April 4, 1999 in Genoa) was an Italian artist, designer, and commercial advertising creator who was prominent in the magazine and television industries in post-war Europe, primarily in Italy.

== Biography ==
During the 1920s he attended the Brera Academy. He was an adherent of Futurism and to the ideas of Filippo Tommaso Marinetti, and became his youngest student and greatest personal friend (Marinetti was his wedding witness).

At that time he met Bruno Munari, with whom he opened the "R + M" graphic studio: together they designed the first brands for industries, they created the first print campaigns and experimented with innovative artistic techniques, from photomontage to useless machines to tactile tables. In the 1940s he directed his interests towards surrealism and metaphysics, Salvador Dalí and Alberto Savinio.

In the postwar period, through design and graphics, Castagnedi returned to the world of advertising and publishing: he worked with Arrigo Benedetti to create the graphics for the weekly periodical "The European", and with Mario Pannunzio for the magazine "Il Mondo". He later became general manager of the magazine Domus and subsequently moved on to work for the Italian public television channel Sipra, where he was among the creators of advertising spots on the show "Carosello". In 1962 he was the first director of the internal advertising office of Rizzoli.

He was engaged in and ultimately led the Rotary Club, and strove for a more modern and aware tourism as he became president of the Touring Club Italiano, where he held office from 1984 to 1988. He died in 1999, during a medical transport by helicopter, following a domestic accident. He rests in the permanent family tomb at the Cimitero Maggiore di Milano.
