= Valentina De Poli =

Italian journalist and editor

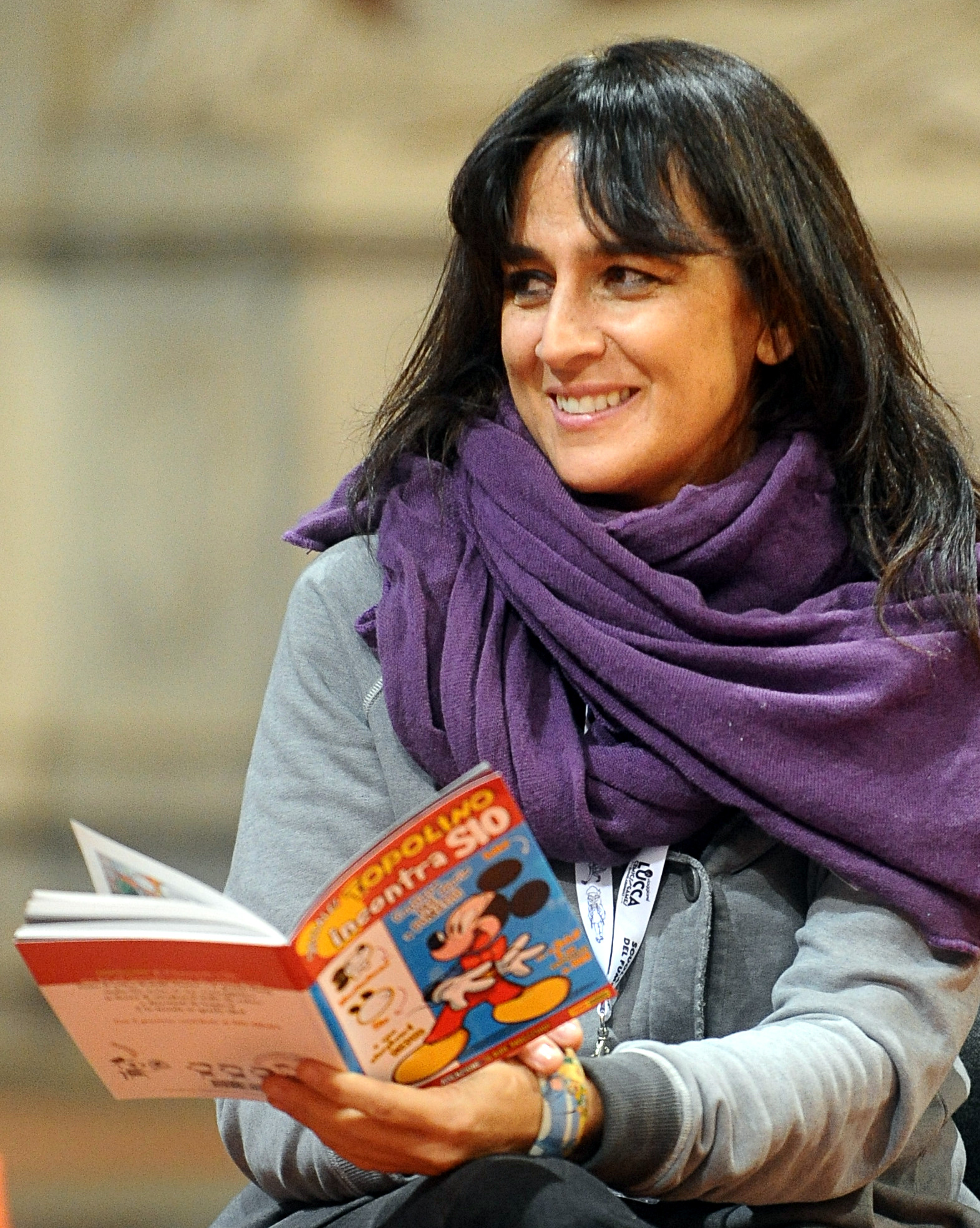
Valentina De Poli at Lucca Comics & Games 2015

Valentina De Poli (born 2 September 1968) is an Italian journalist and editor.

She was born on 2 September 1968 in Milan. She was the second woman to become editor of the weekly Topolino comic book, taking over in 2007 from Claretta Muci, and holding the role until 2018. She had started contributing to the magazine in 1988. Between 2001 and 2007, she was also the editor of the comic book series W.I.T.C.H..
