= Romeo Bertani =

Italian footballer

Personal information
- Date of birth: 17 May 1999 (age 27)
- Place of birth: Ravenna, Italy
- Height: 1.88 m (6 ft 2 in)
- Position: Midfielder

Team information
- Current team: Corticella

Senior career*
Years	Team	Apps	(Gls)
2018–2019	Mezzolara	31	(2)
2019–2020	AlbinoLeffe	7	(0)
2020–2021	Arzignano	2	(0)
2021	Borgosesia	11	(2)
2021–2023	Mezzolara	44	(6)
2023–	Corticella	12	(2)
- * Club domestic league appearances and goals as of 20 December 2023

Romeo Bertani (born 17 May 1999) is an Italian footballer who plays as a midfielder for Serie D club Corticella.

== Club career ==
In July 2019, Bertani moved to Serie C club AlbinoLeffe on a free transfer.

On 2 September 2020, he signed with Arzignano.
