= Matt Bertani =

American ice hockey coach

- Born: March 27, 1976 (age 49); Pittsburgh, Pennsylvania, U.S.
- Occupation: Asst. Coach
- Employer: New York Islanders

Matt Bertani (born March 27, 1976) is an American ice hockey coach. He currently serves as an assistant coach with the South Korean National Ice Hockey Team.

== Career ==
Bertani attended Mercyhurst University on a tennis scholarship while majoring in criminal justice and playing collegiate hockey. After graduating, Bertani moved to Europe and later served as an assistant coach for the Johnstown Chiefs. After the 2004–05 season, Bertani spent three years as the director of player development for Penn State.

On July 28, 2008, Bertani joined the New York Islanders organization as an assistant coach for their AHL affiliate, the Bridgeport Sound Tigers. He moved up to serve as a video coach for the New York Islanders with the 2012–13 NHL season. He held that position until 2018.
