= Arnoldo Mondadori =

Italian publisher (1889–1971)

Cavaliere del lavoro Arnoldo Mondadori OML
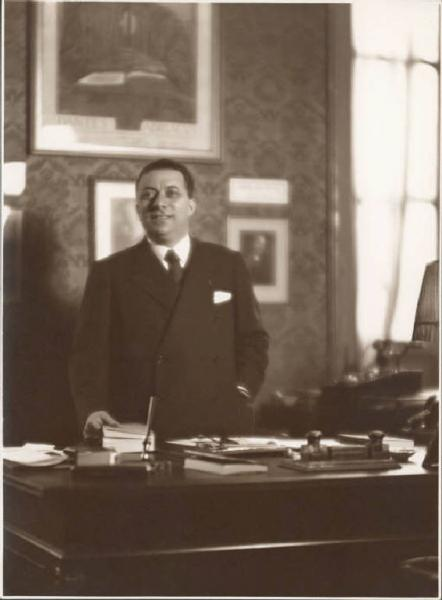
- Arnoldo Mondadori, 1932
- Born: 2 November 1889; Poggio Rusco, Italy
- Died: 8 June 1971 (aged 81); Milan, Italy
- Occupations: Businessman, publisher
- Years active: 1911–1970
- Known for: Founder of Mondadori
- Children: Alberto Mondadori (1914-1976); Giorgio Mondadori (1917-2009); Laura Mondadori (1924-1991); Cristina Mondadori (1934-2015)

Arnoldo Mondadori (2 November 1889 – 8 June 1971) was one of the greatest and most influential Italian publishers of the 20th century. Born into a poor family, he created a publishing empire Arnoldo Mondadori Editore that is today the largest in Italy.

Arnoldo Mondadori was forced to drop out of school after five years of study and began working while still a teenager. He held a variety of jobs before landing a position as an apprentice at a printing house. From there, he gradually built a media empire: his publishing house held a significant share of the market for fiction, popular science, schoolbooks, manuals, and periodicals.

Mondadori was a member of the National Fascist Party since 1924 and collaborated with the Fascist regime in Italy. However, he was not an ideological adherent of fascism; his only concern was keeping his publishing house afloat, and to that end, he conducted business with the party and the government.

== Biography ==
=== Early years and family ===
Arnoldo Mondadori was born in Poggio Rusco, Mantua, in 1889, he was the third of six children of Domenico Secondo, an illiterate itinerant shoemaker, and Ermenegilda Cugola. The family struggled financially. Ermenegilda, as recalled, was forced to count candles that allowed her son to read in the evening: Arnoldo was the most curious among the kids and took every opportunity to read. After the fifth grade of elementary school, he was forced to stop his studies and start working. He was considered lucky, because his brothers had stopped after the third grade. In 1897, the family moved to Ostiglia, where the father had opened an osteria. Later, he began earning a living by working at a grocery store in town, then he worked as a peddler with a horse-drawn cart, and finally, thanks to his soothing voice, as a narrator of intertitles at the town movie theater. From this last experience, he would carry with him for the rest of his life the nickname "Incantabiss" ("snake charmer") because of his deep voice and great powers of persuasion.

At the age of 17, he became an apprentice of a typographer Manzoli. In his own words, it was ‘an old, outdated print shop in Ostiglia, where dust completely covered the type cases, and the hand press lay idle most of the time because the owner had no desire to work; and so I began dusting, learning to set type, and printing.’ There, in 1907, he founded ‘La Sociale’, an enterprise that would later become Mondadori Publishing House.

=== Career ===
From left to right: Luigi Pirandello, Sinclair Lewis and Arnoldo Mondadori, 1932

In 1906, Mondadori won a prize of 5 lire in books for a short story that he had published in Letture per la gioventù magazine, edited by E. Novelli. The event marked the beginning of a journey of self-education that characterized his entire life.

In 1906-1907, with a group of friends Mondadori founded a monthly magazine Luce: giornale popolare istruttivo. With the help of an investor from Banca Agricola Mantovana and his father’s signature (since he was not yet of legal age), he purchased the "Manzoli" printing house in 1907, renamed it "La Sociale," and began printing custom forms, invoices, and letterheads, and hired his siblings Dina and Remo, to work with him.

Mondadori's career as a publisher officially started in 1912 when he published his first book: Aia Madama, a collection of folk tales and customs by the Ostiglia-born writer Tommaso Monicelli. Monicelli became a friend, a valuable collaborator and even a relative as he married Mondadori's sister Andreina in 1913. The title marked the beginning of a collection of children's books ‘La Lampada’, which enjoyed huge commercial success. In the early 1915, Mondadori received a 2000 square meter former factory building in Ostiglia from the city government. He equipped the new premises with 10 printing presses, 1 linotype and a small stereotype printing machine. He began collaborating with the military and printed periodicals such as La Ghirba, La Tradotta, Il Cavallo di Frisia, and Le Fiamme Nere, as well as stationery and printed materials for the army and propaganda leaflets. He also increased his production of fiction and schoolbooks and educational materials which grew both in both quantity and quality. In November 2017, Mondadori invested the earned money into an acquisition of Tipografia Franchini, a printing house in Verona.

Partnership with Senatore Borletti

In 1921, Mondadori entered into a financial partnership with Italian industrialist Senatore Borletti, a prominent entrepreneur associated with the textile industry and the La Rinascente department stores. The agreement led to the reorganization of the publishing business as A. Mondadori Società Anonima on 31 May 1921, with Borletti becoming chairman and Arnoldo Mondadori serving as managing director.

Borletti’s financial backing helped stabilize the company and supported its expansion, while Mondadori continued to direct its publishing activities. Their collaboration also extended to major editorial ventures, including the publication of the collected works of Gabriele D’Annunzio.

Borletti remained chairman until his death in 1939. Mondadori subsequently acquired majority control of the publishing house in 1940, marking a significant transition in the company’s ownership and governance.

In 1921, Arnoldo Mondadori bought a 14,000 square meter factory building in via San Nazaro, Verona, for 450,000 lire. All the printing equipment from the old premises of the former Francini printing house and from Ostiglia was moved to Verona. At this point, his company counted more than 250 employees.

In 1925, Mondadori received the Order of Merit for Labour.

After the First World War, Mondadori launched many successful book series. Of particular importance wereI libri gialli (‘the yellow books’), launched in 1929. The series of crime novels, released weekly, had a characteristic design with a yellow front cover background. The series was so successful and influential that it gave its name to an entire genre. In 1933, Mondadori launched Meduza (collana), a series dedicated to modern foreign literature, introducing to Italian public such writers as John Galsworthy, Aldous Huxley, Francois Mauriac, André Maurois, Pearl S. Buck, Thomas Mann, André Gide, and others.

In 1935, through an agreement with Walt Disney, the publishing house began the publication of children's magazines based on Disney comics characters, which ran until 1988, when the agreement between Mondadori and the Walt Disney Company ended. After several warnings, in 1941 the government prohibited to publish pages with Mickey Mouse (Topolino in Italy), but Mondadori managed to negotiate his way through it and substitute Mickey with Tuffolino, an anthropomorph character created byartists Federico Pedrocchi and Pier Lorenzo De Vita.

=== Mondadori and the Fascist Party ===
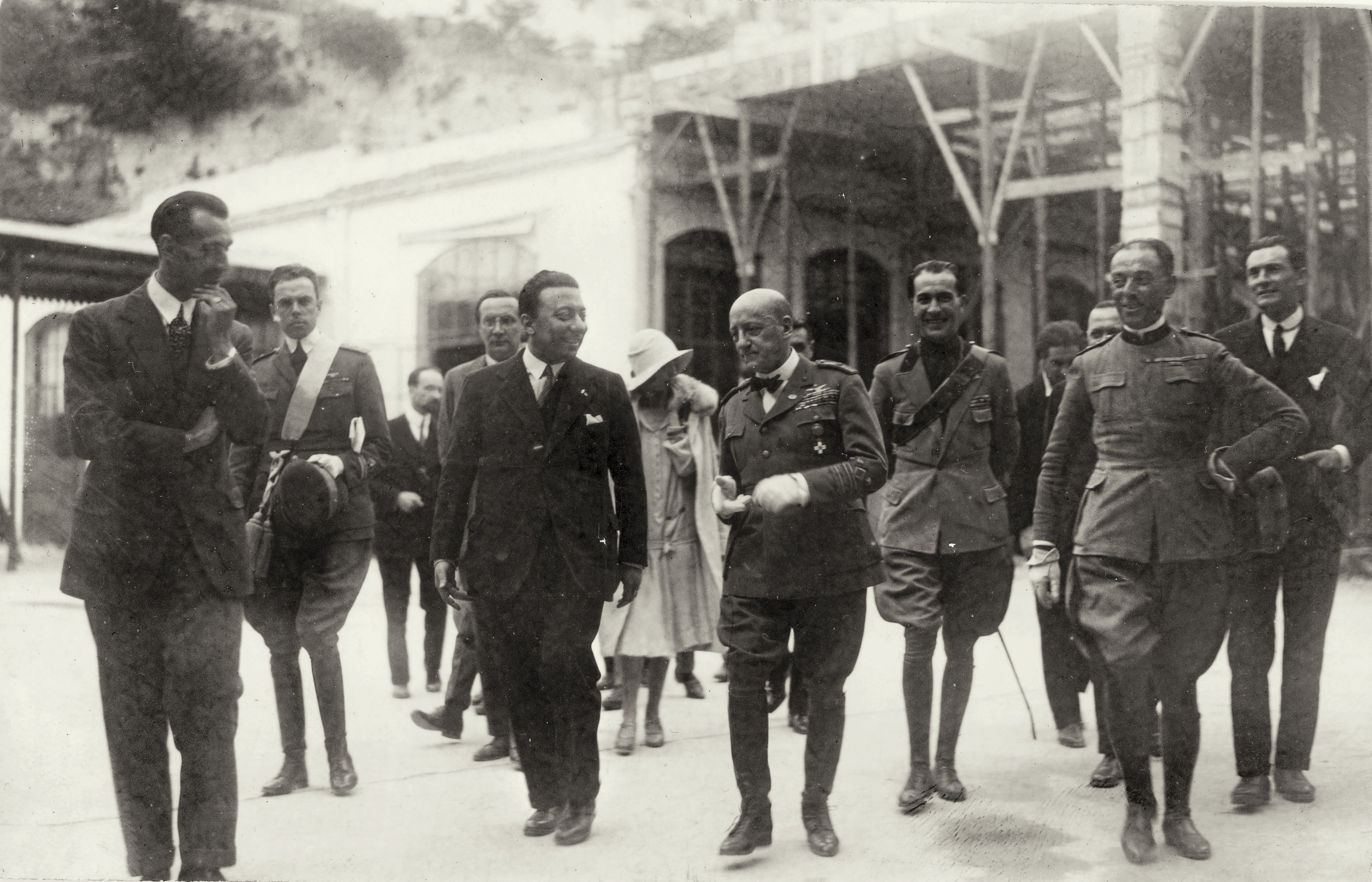
Arnoldo Mondadori with Gabriele D'Annunzio, before 1938

In the 1930s, in order to backdate his adherence to fascism, Mondadori stated that he had printed leaflets for the March on Rome at his printing shop in Verona, though the claim appears to lack corroborating evidence, the date of his enrollment in the National Fascist Party, Verona chapter, on 27 February 1924, is certain.

Beginning in the early 1920s, Mondadori sought to forge closer ties with the leaders of Fascism and Mussolini himself. One of the first opportunities was the publication of Duce's biography, titled Dux, written by Margherita Sarfatti. Already published in the United Kingdom under the more neutral title The Life of Benito Mussolini, the work, which was essentially apologetic, was released in June 1926 with a preface by Mussolini himself, following a thorough and non-superficial revision by the protagonist, and was an extraordinary success. It was against this backdrop that a publishing decision was made that seemed risky at first glance: the decision, in 1932, to entrust the writing of a comprehensive biography of Mussolini the statesman to the German-Jewish writer Emil Ludwig. The work, titled Colloqui con Mussolini (1933), was fiercely contested by the most hardline Fascists both because it was based largely on the author’s meetings with Mussolini and because it sought to present an image of absolute truthfulness, despite the fact that Mussolini himself had once again reviewed the drafts and taken care to tone down content deemed too controversial, particularly regarding relations with the Vatican.

The researcher Giorgio Fabre in his 2018 book Il censore e l’editore: Mussolini, i libri, Mondadori (A censor and a publisher: Mussolini, books, Mondadori) claims that even though Mondadori was the official publisher of Libro del fascista, an official handbook published by the National Fascist Party (PNF) beginning in the late 1930s, and enjoyed a vast financial support from the fascist government, he disliked Mussolini and committed some steps to avoid censorship. He also refused to publish the Italian translation of Mein Kampf; he introduced Thomas Mann's works and devised strategies to evade the police, printing some texts in Italian-speaking Switzerland. After 1938, he set aside the royalty payments owed to Jewish authors, hoping that Mussolini's turn toward racism would be short-lived. When, in 1938, the fascist regime attempted to censor Alba de Céspedes's first novel Alba de Céspedes, demanding that it be removed from bookstores, Mondadori personally opposed this order.

In 1945, after eighteen months of exile in Switzerland, he returned to Verona and resumed the business he had set aside for that year and a half. That moment was marked with the first conflict between Arnoldo Mondadori and his eldest son Alberto Mondadori, who had developed a sincere anti-fascist conviction, and asserted the need for a militant shift that would openly position the publishing house within the progressive political sphere. This disagreement between father and son led Alberto to leave the family enterprise and open the publishing house "Il Saggiatore" in 1958. However, "Il Saggiatore" never became profitable and relied on the funds provided by Arnoldo Mondadori and his publishing house.

=== Late years ===
In 1959, the University of Pavia awarded him an honorary degree. In 1963, he was named an honorary citizen of Verona and received the "S. Zeno" Prize at its inaugural ceremony in 1963.

One of Mondadori’s major achievements was the Oscar Mondadori series, conceived and launched in 1965. The series took the form of pocket-sized paperback books and sold at newsstands for low prices. They revolutionized the Italian publishing market and helped realize Mondadori's dream to making reading widely accessible.

In 1968, he handed over the reins of the company to his son Giorgio and assumed the position of honorary chairman, leaving the role of deputy director to his son-in-law Mario Formenton, who would later become the de facto manager of Italy’s largest publishing house.

Arnoldo Mondadori died in Milan on 8 June 1971.

=== Personal life ===
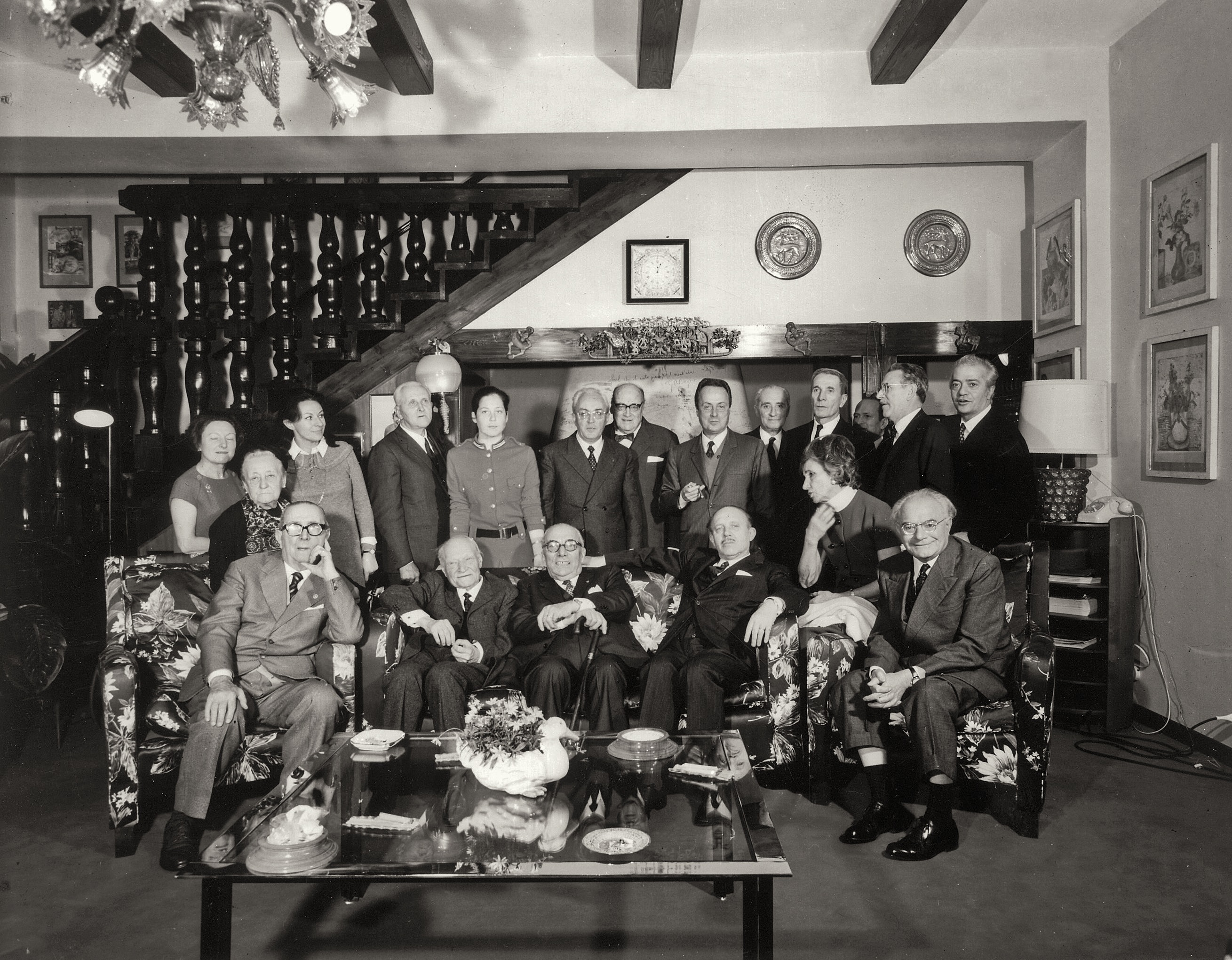
Italian publisher Arnoldo Mondadori with authors Giuseppe Ungaretti, Mario Soldati, Guido Piovene, Dino Buzzati, and Piero Chiara, in the villa of Meina, Christmas 1968.

In 1913, he married Andreina Monicelli, the sister of Tommaso Monicelli. The couple had four children: Alberto (1914-1976), Giorgio (1917-2009), Laura (1924-1991), and Cristina (1934-2015). Both Alberto and Giorgio later joined the family business as managers.

In the mid-1920s, Mondadori was looking for a summer residence for his family. In Meina, near Arona, a small town on lago Maggiore, he bought a late 19th-century Art Nouveau building that once belonged to the musician and conductor Luigi Mancinelli, and rebuilt it into a 1,400 square meter 4-storey villa. Called La Verbanella, the villa had more than 50 rooms and 20 bedrooms to host all members of the big family and frequent guests and collaborators of Arnoldo Mondadori, including Thomas Mann, Georges Simenon, Ernest Hemingway, Eugenio Montale, and many more. In 2019, the villa was purchased by Donatella Versace.

Valentino Bompiani, who worked along Mondadori for more than five years as a secretary and later as a fellow editor, recalled him as ‘a man of great grace and elegance, full of patience and tact. He was also a very down-to-earth person who wasn't ashamed to ask for help when necessary.’

Mondadori's incredible career was marked with a life-long rivalry with Angelo Rizzoli. They were born two days apart in late 1889 and died eight months apart, both at the age of eighty-one. Both started as typographers and came from very poor families. Mondadori routinely referred to Rizzoli as "that gangster," while Rizzoli reportedly refused to even say Mondadori's name out loud.

From the surviving family correspondence, it is clear that Arnoldo had an authoritarian, domineering personality, and this often complicated his relationship with Alberto. On the one hand, he wanted his eldest son to be like him; on the other hand, he was not willing to accept his son’s decisions.

== Literature ==
- Il cinquantennio editoriale di Arnoldo Mondadori 1907-1957. Verona: Arnoldo Mondadori. 1957.
- Mondadori, Sebastiano (2022). Verità di famiglia. Riscrivendo la storia di Alberto Mondadori. Milan: La Nave di Teseo. ISBN 978-88-346-1258-3.
- Bonsaver, Guido (2013). Mussolini censore: Storie di letteratura, dissenso e ipocrisia. Editori Laterza. ISBN 9788858109793.
- Scarpa, Domenico (31 May 1997). "Ritratto dell'editore da cucciolo". Belfagor. 52 (3): 303–316.
- Cadioli, Alberto; Vigini, Giuliano (2018). Storia dell'editoria in Italia dall'Unità a oggi. Milano: Editrice Bibliografica. p. 116-117. ISBN 9788893570053.
