= L'Avventuroso =

Discontinued weekly comics magazine in Italy

- Categories: Comics magazine
- Frequency: Weekly
- Founded: 1934
- Final issue: 1943
- Company: Mondadori
- Country: Italy
- Based in: Milan
- Language: Italian

L'Avventuroso (Italian for "The Adventurer") was a weekly comic magazine published in Italy from 1934 to 1943. It was the first Italian comics magazine which explicitly aspired to have a more mature audience than infancy, and it is regarded as a magazine which had a key role in the success of comics in Italy.

== History and profile ==
L'Avventuroso was established in 1934. The magazine was published weekly.

Directed by the Florentine publisher Mario Nerbini, the magazine introduced to the Italian audience several successful American comic series, in the main part originally owned by King Features Syndicate, including Flash Gordon, Jungle Jim, Secret Agent X-9, Radio Patrol, Terry and the Pirates, The Phantom, Red Barry. Its average circulation was about 300,000 / 350,000 copies per week, with peaks of over 500,000 copies.

L'Avventuroso ceased publication in 1943.

== See also ==
- List of magazines published in Italy

== Notes ==
- Media related to L'Avventuroso at Wikimedia Commons
