= Federico Pedrocchi =

Italian comics artist

Federico Pedrocchi (1 May 1907 – 20 January 1945) was an Italian comic book artist and writer. He sometimes used the pen name Costanzo Federici. He founded the magazine Paperino e altre avventure (Donald Duck and Other Adventures) in 1937, and wrote some of the earliest Disney comic book stories.

== Life and career ==
Pedrocchi was born in Buenos Aires, Argentina of Italian parents, and he moved back to Italy with his family in 1912. Forced to interrupt his studies because of his father's death, in 1930 he opened a small advertising studio and the same year he started collaborating as illustrator with the children magazine Corriere dei Piccoli and with a number of other magazines, notably La Domenica del Corriere. In 1935 he debuted as a cartoonist with the story "I due tamburini", and in 1936 he started collaborating with Cesare Zavattini for the script of Saturno contro la Terra.

In 1937 Pedrocchi was allowed by Disney to write and draw stories with Disney characters, and the same year he founded the magazine Paperino e altre avventure (Donald Duck and Other Adventures), published by Mondadori, in which Donald Duck became the protagonist of long, adventurous stories. Pedrocchi wrote eight serials starring Disney characters for the paper, featuring Donald Duck, Goofy (Pippo) and the characters from Snow White and the Seven Dwarfs (Biancaneve e i Setti Nani). During the same period, he also wrote two further Disney stories which were printed in Mondadori's biweekly publication Albi d'oro.

Following the success of the magazine, he was appointed editorial and artistic director of Mondadori's comic magazines in 1939, a role he maintained until he was enlisted in the army in 1942. Pedrocchi died in Gallarate at 37 years old, after having been hit by a burst of machine gun during an English air raid.

== Disney comics bibliography ==
Pedrocchi's Disney stories in Paperino e altre avventure were:

- Paolino Paperino e il mistero di Marte (Donald Duck and the Secret of Mars): issues #1-18
- Paolino Paperino inviato speciale (Donald Duck, Special Correspondent): #19-48
- Pippo viaggiatore di commercio (Goofy, Business Traveler): #40-48
- Paperino fra i pellirosse (Donald Duck Among the Redskins): #72-100
- Biancaneve e il mago Basilisco (Snow White and Basilisk the Wizard): #72-100
- Paperino chiromante (Donald Duck, Fortune Teller): #101-130
- I Sette Nani cattivi contro i Sette Nani buoni (The Seven Bad Dwarves Against the Seven Good Dwarfs): #101-121
- Paperino e il vaso cinese (Donald Duck and the Chinese Vase): #131-149

The stories published in Albi d'oro were:

- Paperino e la pietra filosofale (Donald Duck and the Philosopher's Stone): #22/1938
- Clarabella fra gli artigli del diavolo nero (Clarabelle in the Claws of the Black Devil): #25/1939
