= Donald Duck in comics =

Donald Duck, a cartoon character created by the Walt Disney Company, is today the star of dozens of comic-book and comic-strip stories published each month around the world. In many European countries, Donald is considered the lead character in Disney comics, more important and beloved than Mickey Mouse.

In the United States, the Donald Duck comic strip debuted on February 7, 1938, following a 1936-1937 trial run in the Silly Symphony Sunday page. The strip ran for more than 50 years, ending in 1995.

The Donald Duck comic book first appeared as part of Dell Comics' Four Color Comics one-shot series, beginning in 1942 (published as Four Color #9). It became an independent comic book with issue #26 in November 1952.

Donald Duck also has a prominent role in Walt Disney's Comics and Stories, the American flagship anthology comic first published in 1940. The most popular issues featured the Donald Duck 10-pagers written and drawn by Carl Barks, who began the run with issue #31 (April 1943).

== Pre-cartoon namesake ==
The earliest print mention of a character called "Donald Duck" is in 1931 in the book The Adventures of Mickey Mouse, published by David McKay Company, Philadelphia. On the first text page, none of which are numbered, the third paragraph begins, "Mickey has many friends in the old barn and the barnyard, besides Minnie Mouse. They are Henry Horse and Carolyn Cow and Patricia Pig and Donald Duck..."

A duck with the same name made another early printed appearance in Mickey Mouse Annual #3 (published 1932; the annual for 1933), a 128-page British hardback. This book included the poem Mickey's 'Hoozoo': Witswitch, and Wotswot, which listed some of Mickey's barnyard animal friends: "Donald Duck and Clara Hen, Robert Rooster, Jenny Wren...". Mickey Mouse Annual #3 was drawn entirely by Wilfred Haughton.

== Comic strip debut ==
The Donald introduced in the short film The Wise Little Hen made his printed debut in the June 1934 issue of Good Housekeeping magazine: a single-page ad depicted six comic images of Donald as part of the monthly Silly Symphony section. Later that year, Donald made his newspaper debut in the comic strip adaptation of that cartoon. It was released between September 16 and December 16, 1934, in the Silly Symphony Sunday pages by Ted Osborne and Al Taliaferro.

Starting February 10, 1935, Donald appeared in the Sunday variant of the Mickey Mouse comic strip by Ted Osborne and Floyd Gottfredson. He would make his daily strip appearance on March 13, 1935 in the story "Editor-in-Grief." In the story, Mickey hires Donald as a newsboy to sell Mickey's newspaper, the Daily War-Drum. The paper is involved in a battle with a criminal gang who try to keep Donald from selling the paper, which makes him furious and even more determined. Donald is there for the happy ending at Mickey's house on May 30, and then disappears from the strip for a while.

== Featured character ==
A supporting character in Mickey's strip, Donald came to dominate the Silly Symphony strips between August 30, 1936, and December 12, 1937. At the time, Ted Osborne was credited as writer and Al Taliaferro as artist and inker. The duo turned Donald from a countryman to a city dweller. They also introduced the first members of the Duck family: Donald's identical triplet nephews Huey, Dewey, and Louie, who debuted on October 17, 1937. The triplets were sent to spend some time with him as guests while their father recovered at the hospital from their latest prank. Nevertheless, Donald ended up serving as their adoptive parent.

== Comic book debut ==
At this time, the first Donald Duck stories originally created for a comic book made their appearance. In the United Kingdom, Odhams Press also created original stories with Donald Duck. "Donald and Donna", published in Mickey Mouse Weekly #67 (May 15, 1937), was the first Donald Duck adventure ever. The story was fifteen pages long and published in weekly episodes. The last appeared on August 21, 1937. All episodes were drawn by William A. Ward.

Disney had also licensed the Italian publishing house Mondadori to create stories with the Disney characters as their stars. The first to star Donald, under his Italian name Paolino Paperino, was "Paolino Paperino e il mistero di Marte", written and drawn by Federico Pedrocchi for the new 1937 Disney comics magazine Donald Duck and Other Adventures (Paperino e altre avventure). The story was later reprinted in the United States as "The Secret of Mars" in Donald Duck #286.

In February 1940, Donald Duck made his first appearance as the main character on the cover of an American comic book in Dell Publishing's Four Color #4.

== Developments under Taliaferro ==
Back in the USA, Donald finally became the star of his own newspaper comic strip. The Donald Duck daily strip started on February 2, 1938, and the Donald Duck Sunday page began December 10, 1939. Taliaferro drew both, this time co-operating with writer Bob Karp. He continued to work at the daily strip until October 10, 1968, and at the Sunday page until February 16, 1969.

Among other innovations, Taliaferro made several additions to Donald's supporting cast. Bolivar, Donald's pet St. Bernard first appeared in the strip on March 17, 1938, following his animated appearances in Alpine Climbers (July 25, 1936) and More Kittens (December 19, 1936). Donald's cousin Gus Goose made his first appearance on May 9, 1938, in a series of strips that promoted his upcoming debut short Donald's Cousin Gus (1939). Daisy Duck first appeared in the strip on November 4, 1940, following her first proper animated appearance in Mr. Duck Steps Out, first released on June 7, 1940. Donald's paternal grandmother, usually just called Grandma Duck, first appeared in a portrait on August 11, 1940, and in person on September 28, 1943. Taliaferro also reintroduced Donna Duck as a separate character from Daisy. This old flame of Donald rivaled Daisy for his affections between August 7, 1951 and August 18, 1951, before leaving him for another.

== First treasure hunt ==
Donald had already been familiar to the American reading public through his newspaper comic strip by 1942. Then Disney licensed Western Publishing to create original comic book stories, with Disney characters as their stars. But the first American Donald Duck story originally created for a comic book was created by Studio-employed artists: Donald Duck Finds Pirate Gold, first published in October 1942. The story was written by Bob Karp, who based it on the storyboard of the unproduced Mickey Mouse short Morgan's Ghost by Harry Reeves and Homer Brightman. Karp gave Donald a starring role by removing Mickey and Goofy from the plot while also adding Donald's nephews. Then it was given to Carl Barks and Jack Hannah to illustrate.

The story places Donald and his nephews on a treasure hunt for the lost treasure of Henry Morgan, and it manages to combine elements of humor and adventure with dramatic moments and mystery rather well. Though it is one of his early drawings, Barks's attention to detail is already visible. The script asked for drawings of a Harbor and a sailing ship. Barks decided to use issues of National Geographic, which he collected, as reference sources. It was the first Donald story drawn by Barks for a comic book and the first to involve Donald in a treasure hunting expedition. Barks would later use the treasure-hunting theme in many of his own stories.

== Developments under Barks ==
Until this point, the development of both the animated and the comic strip version of Donald was the result of a combined effort by a number of different creators, but the comic book version of Donald was mainly developed by Carl Barks beginning in 1943. The comic version had already diverged from the animated one in a number of ways. This same division between Mouse strips and Duck strips was generally followed in the comic books. Pete, however, remained his villain of choice for the first few years of his comic book work. Barks largely did away with Donald's animated persona as a loafing, lazy hothead whose main quality is his hardly understandable quacking. To make him suitable for a comic-book story, Barks redefined his personality and gave him articulated speech and shaded emotions. To give Donald a world to live in, Barks developed the city of Duckburg in the American state of Calisota. He was allowed to focus entirely on his own cast of Duckburg citizens, such as the richest duck in the world, Uncle Scrooge McDuck, lucky cousin Gladstone Gander, and peculiar inventor Gyro Gearloose. In the comics, Donald lives in a Duckburg house with Huey, Dewey, and Louie Duck.

Much of this scenario would resurface in the 1987 television series, DuckTales. In that cartoon, however, Donald works and lives as a sailor on an aircraft carrier, and Huey, Dewey and Louie live for a time with Uncle Scrooge.

Barks quit working at the Studio and found employment at Western Publishing with a starting pay of twelve dollars and fifty cents per page. He created his first Donald Duck ten-pager, The Victory Garden, which first published in April 1943; the basic script came from the studio, but Barks was asked to rewrite it in addition to drawing it. From then on, Barks both scripted and illustrated his stories, with few exceptions.

His production during that year seems to be at the pace he would follow for much of the following decade. Eight 10-pagers to be published in Walt Disney's Comics and Stories, published in a monthly basis, and one longer story for the sporadically published Donald Duck. In this case the story was Donald Duck and the Mummy's Ring, 28-pages long, first published in September, 1943. The shorter stories would usually focus on Donald's everyday life and on comedy, while the longer ones were usually adventure stories set in exotic locales. The latter would often contain more dramatic elements and darker themes, and would place Donald and his nephews into dangerous and often near-fatal situations. To add realism to his illustration of those stories' settings, Barks would still seek reference sources. The magazine National Geographic would usually provide most of the material he needed.

In both cases the stories presented Donald's personality as having multiple aspects that would surface according to circumstance. Or as Barks would say later: "He was sometimes a villain, and he was often a real good guy and at all times he was just a blundering person like the average human being." Adding another note of realism was that Donald could end up being either the victor or the loser in his stories. And often even his victories were hollow. This gave a sense of realism to Donald's character and the characters and situations around him. His nephews accompanied him in those stories and Barks also gave many aspects to their personalities. In some cases they acted as the mischievous brats Taliaferro had introduced, often antagonizing their uncle. In some cases they got in trouble and Donald would have to save them. But in others they proved remarkably resourceful and inventive, often helping their uncle out of a difficult situation. But most of the time, they would appear to have developed a deeper understanding of things and level of maturity than their uncle.

The first recurring character that Barks would introduce was Donald's next-door Neighbor Jones. He was mentioned by name and made a cameo in Good Deeds, first published in July, 1943. He was mentioned as a neighbor that Donald likes to tease. Then he made his first full appearance in Good Neighbors, first published in November 1943. There Donald and he appear to have agreed to a truce. But when they misinterpret a number of chance events to be covert attacks by their respective neighbor, they resume their fighting with renewed determination. Jones seems to always be in a bad mood and Donald just serves to make him angry. The two irrational and easily irritated neighbors would serve as the focus of a number of short stories. From 1947, Jones was also used by non-Barks comics writers; from the 1960s onward, he has frequently reappeared in stories by a great number of authors.

The next two recurring characters to be introduced by Barks were much more significant. Donald's maternal uncle Scrooge McDuck made his first appearance in Christmas on Bear Mountain, first published in December 1947. The first member of The Clan McDuck to appear, his name was based on Ebenezer Scrooge, a fictional character from Charles Dickens's A Christmas Carol. The story's title was based on A Night on Bald Mountain by Modest Mussorgsky, a scene of Fantasia. Scrooge's first appearance was almost immediately followed by that of Donald's first cousin Gladstone Gander in Wintertime Wager, first published in January, 1948. Both characters did not yet have their now-recognizable characteristics. Scrooge was a bearded, bespectacled, reasonably wealthy old duck living in isolation in a huge mansion who is visibly leaning on his cane. Gladstone was presented as a rather arrogant cousin, he does not yet lay claim to the title of The Luckiest Duck In the World, and Daisy still has no interest in Gladstone.

In the following years both characters would become prominent members of Donald's supporting cast. In Gladstone's case, he soon started to rival his cousin in a number of personal wagers and organized contests. His incredible luck was introduced in Race to the South Seas!, first published in 1949. This story also was the first to present Donald and Gladstone trying to win Scrooge's favor in order for one of them to become his heir. The story also explains their relationship to their rich relative: Donald is the son of Scrooge's sister and Gladstone is the son of Scrooge's sister's sister-in-law. Gladstone would also rival his cousin in a treasure hunt in Luck of the North, first published in December, 1949. Gladstone soon became Donald's rival for Daisy's affections. The love-triangle of Donald, Daisy and Gladstone would become an ongoing theme for the following decades.

While Gladstone's development and establishment seemed to take about a year after his appearance, Barks continued to experiment with Scrooge's appearance and personality for the following four years. Scrooge was soon established as a recurring character and various stories cast him as a featured character alongside Donald. By 1952, Scrooge had gained a magazine of his own. From then on Barks produced most of his longer stories in Uncle Scrooge with Scrooge as their star and focusing in adventure, while his ten-pagers continued to feature Donald as their star and focused on comedy. Scrooge became the central figure of the stories while Donald and their nephews were cast as Scrooge's helpers, hired helping-hands who followed Scrooge around the world. Other contemporary creators also reflected this change of focus from Donald to Scrooge in stories. Since then the role of the central figure in new stories alternates between Donald and Scrooge.

== Further developments ==
Hundreds of other authors have used the character — for example, the Disney Studio artists that made comics directly for the European market. Two of these, Dick Kinney and Al Hubbard, created Donald's cousin Fethry Duck, an obsessive dreamer with a love of discovering new lifestyles and hobbies. Fethry remains one of the most popular Duck characters in Italy and Brazil, frequently with his own comic book title in Brazil.

The American artists Vic Lockman and Tony Strobl, working directly for the American comic books, created Moby Duck.

Don Rosa started writing and drawing Disney comics in 1987 for the American publisher Gladstone. He later worked briefly for the Dutch editors, but moved to work directly for Egmont soon afterwards. Rosa created numerous sequels to Barks' stories, including a 12-part series on The Life and Times of Scrooge McDuck, which won Rosa two Eisner awards. Also for Egmont, Rosa developed a popular edition of the Donald Duck family tree. Rosa retired in 2008, two years after the publication of his last story.

Other important artists who have worked on Donald are Freddy Milton and Daan Jippes, who made eighteen ten-pagers in the 1970s and 1980s that some claim are as good as Barks' work. More recently, both Jippes and Milton have continued to produce Duck stories on a solo basis.

Romano Scarpa, an Italian Disney artist, created Brigitta MacBridge, a female Duck who is madly in love with Scrooge. Her affections are rarely reciprocated, although she perseveres. Scarpa also created Dickie Duck (Paperetta Ye-Ye in Italian), granddaughter of Glittering Goldie (Scrooge's prospective love interest in the Klondike), and Kildare Coot (Sgrizzo Papero in Italian), an eccentric nephew of Grandma Duck.

=== Paperinik (Superduck / Duck Avenger) ===
Paperinik, also known as PK (Italy), Superduck (UK), Duck Avenger (USA), (Note: The latter used in Italy for Donald as a fictional superhero different from Paperinik.)) is a comic book-costumed vigilante, Donald Duck's alter ego. Donald originally created Paperinik as a dark avenger alter-identity to secretly seek revenge upon relatives such as Scrooge McDuck and Gladstone Gander, but he soon found himself fighting other menaces as a superhero. The character is an Italian invention and, though dominant in stories in which he appears, is very much absent from all others not starring him. The Italian creators (editor-in-chief Elisa Penna, writer Guido Martina, and artist Giovan Battista Carpi) introduced Paperinik in the two-part, 60-page story "Paperinik il diabolico vendicatore" ("Paperinik the diabolical avenger") published in Italy in Topolino #706–707, on June 8 and June 15, 1969. The name "Paperinik" was initially meant to reference the Italian comic book antihero Diabolik, to which Paperinik's original depictions wear similarities.

== Donald's character history ==
According to Don Rosa, Donald was born in 1920, however, this is not an official year of birth. According to Carl Barks, Donald's parents are Hortense McDuck and Quackmore Duck. Donald’s sister is named Della Duck, but neither she nor Donald's parents appear in the cartoons or comics except for special cases, like The Life and Times of Scrooge McDuck. According to Rosa, Donald and Della are twins.

== See also ==
- Donald Duck – the character in film and comics
- Huey, Dewey and Louie and The Junior Woodchucks
- Scrooge McDuck and the Clan McDuck
- Daisy Duck and the extended Duck family
- Donald Duck universe – cast, locations and themes
- List of Donald Duck universe characters
- Disney comics – comic strips and books
- Inducks – Disney comics database
- Al Taliaferro / Carl Barks / Don Rosa – comics creators
- List of Disney comics by Carl Barks / List of Disney comics by Don Rosa
- Donald Duck – comic strip / Donald Duck / WDC&S / Uncle Scrooge – comic books
- Donaldism – Disney comics fandom / Flipism – theory from a Donald Duck comic
- Mickey Mouse – comic strip / Mickey Mouse – comic book / Mickey Mouse universe
