= List of unproduced Disney animated projects =

This is a list of unmade and/or unreleased animated projects by The Walt Disney Company. These include feature films, short films, and television series/specials, stemming from Walt Disney Animation Studios, Pixar, Disney Television Animation, and other animation studios owned by The Walt Disney Company. Some of these projects stem from simply Walt Disney Pictures.

== 1930s ==
=== 1933 ===
Series	Title	Description
Feature film	Alice in Wonderland	The first attempt to produce an animated film adaptation of the classic novel of the same name written by Lewis Carroll. The film would be the first theatrical animated feature-length film of Disney. It was planned to be a combination of animation with live-action. Mary Pickford was attached to star as Alice. However, the project was scrapped in favor of Snow White and the Seven Dwarfs. In 1939, there was a second attempt to produce the animated film. Following the success of Snow White and the Seven Dwarfs, Disney purchased the film rights to Carroll's book with Sir John Tenniel's illustrations. A script and some storyboards were made by David Hall, as well as a Leica reel, but the project never materialized due to World War II. Twelve years later, a film based on the novel was released by Disney.

=== 1934 ===
Series	Title	Description
Mickey Mouse	"Hillbilly" "Mickey the Hillbilly" "Hillbilly Mickey"	Pete the moonshiner mistakes Mickey for a revenue agent, and Minnie Mouse appears as a hillbilly girl.
Mickey Mouse	"Station Agent"	Mickey works at a train station, where he encounters a troublesome kangaroo. During the development of the cartoon, the kangaroo was dropped in favor of an ostrich. At one time, Mickey was supposed to help Donald with the ostrich, before he was omitted from the plot altogether in favor of the duck. The original kangaroo elements ended up in "Mickey's Kangaroo", which was released in 1935, minus the train station. Probably at the same time as Mickey was dropped from the cartoon, the film (now starring Donald Duck) was renamed "Donald's Ostrich", which was released in 1937.
Pluto	"The Good Samaritan"	Pluto rescues a baby puppy that wrecks the house of his black mistress. A short with this plot was made for House of Mouse.

=== 1935 ===
Series	Title	Description
Mickey Mouse	"Mickey's Vaudeville Show"	Mickey is a magician with a hat. Donald and Pluto are his helpers. Donald is frustrated and wants to expose Mickey's act. The magic act is followed by a grand opera, featuring Mickey, Donald, Clara Cluck, and Pluto, and exposing the hat again. During the development, this was split into two cartoons, since the plot was considered too thick for a standard short, and it became "Mickey's Magic Hat". During the development of the former short, Donald was downgraded from Mickey's helper to a frustrated spectator role. It was released in 1937 as "Magician Mickey". Somewhere during the development after the split, "Mickey's Grand Opera" was produced first and kept most of the original elements, and it was released in 1936.
Mickey Mouse	"The Sea Monster" "Mickey's Sea Monster"	Mickey, Donald, and Goofy are pitted against a comic sea serpent.
Silly Symphonies	"The Emperor's New Clothes"	A proposed Silly Symphony based on Hans Christian Andersen's story about two weavers who promise an emperor a new suit of clothes that is invisible to those unfit for their positions, stupid, or incompetent.

=== 1936 ===
Series	Title	Description
Mickey Mouse	"Davy Jones' Locker" "Pearl Divers"	Mickey goes undersea treasure hunting.
Mickey Mouse	"The Deer Hunt"	Mickey sets out to hunt deer in a story that was supposed to feature all of the same plot elements as in the released cartoon The Pointer in 1939.
Mickey Mouse	"Desert Prospectors"	Mickey, Donald, and Goofy discover a ledge of 19-karat gold in the desert with the aid of an automatic gold-finder, which has been constructed by Goofy. However, the machine goes berserk when it gets too close to Donald's gold belt buckle, attacking the duck and ultimately exploding a stick of dynamite. The trio of prospectors are left in tattered disarray.
Mickey Mouse	"The Emperor's New Clothes"	When the Silly Symphony failed to materialize, Mickey Mouse was brought into the story and the concept was developed as either a short or featurette. At one point, Donald and Goofy were also considered for inclusion in the plot.
Mickey Mouse	"The Love Nest"	Mickey, Donald, and Goofy are interior designers who set up a honeymoon cottage for Horace Horsecollar and Clarabelle Cow.
Mickey Mouse	"Mickey's Bakery"	Mickey, Donald, and Goofy bake an enormous cake for Mrs. Vandersnoot's reception.
Mickey Mouse	"Mickey's Sunken Treasure"	Mickey, Donald, and Goofy go treasure hunting and end up on a desert island.
Mickey Mouse	"Mickey's Treasure Hunt"	Mickey, Donald, and Goofy go treasure hunting on a shipwreck.
Mickey Mouse	"Navy Mickey" also known as "Mickey in the Navy"	Mickey joins the Navy, where he encounters a bulldog admiral.
Mickey Mouse	"North West Mounted" "Royal Mounted Police" "Mickey of the Mounted" "Mickey Gets His Man" "Mickey the Mountie"	Black Pete kidnaps Minnie Mouse and tries to force her to disclose the location of her secret gold mine. Intrepid mountie Mickey gives chase, but is hampered in his search by the antics of his gluttonous horse Tanglefoot.
Silly Symphonies	"Snowbabies"	A proposed Silly Symphony, a sequel to "Water Babies", and a sequel/prequel to "Merbabies". The babies are now playing in the snow instead of water.
Silly Symphonies	"Struebel Peter" "Slovenly Peter"	A proposed Silly Symphony featuring Peter, an unruly boy who delights in tormenting animals. The animals, in the end, take their revenge.
Silly Symphonies; Mickey, Donald & Goofy	"The Three Bears" "Goldie Locks and Three Bears"	(Version 1:) A proposed Silly Symphony of the well-known children's story. Model sheets prove that Goldilocks was planned to resemble and possibly be voiced by Shirley Temple. Papa Bear was modeled after W.C. Fields. (Version 2:) When the proposed Silly Symphony short failed to materialize, Donald was cast as Goldilocks while Pete, Goofy, and Mickey were cast in the roles of the Three Bears.
Silly Symphonies	"Timid Elmer" "Elmer's Light o Love"	A proposed sequel to the Elmer Elephant Silly Symphony. Elmer has to watch helplessly as Tillie Tiger's ballet arts of Granville inspires Goat. When trouble comes, Goat runs away and Elmer has to save Tillie.
Feature film	Peter Rabbit	A proposed animated film based on the Peter Rabbit books written by Beatrix Potter. However, she refused Walt Disney's offer to make the film. 82 years later, Columbia Pictures produced a live-action/CGI film adaptation version.

=== 1937 ===
Series	Title	Description
Donald Duck	"Interior Decorators"	Donald and his assistant Gus Goose are entrusted with the renovation of a villa. Donald encounters a throbbing cuckoo clock. If this film were completed, it would have been the debut of Gus Goose.
Donald Duck	"Lumberjack Donald"	Donald gives the orphans a how-to lesson on how to cut down a tree. A different lumberjack Donald Duck cartoon was eventually titled Timber and released in 1941.
Donald Duck	"Nightwatchman Donald"	Donald is a night watchman in a store, in which he has to deal with a playful monkey.
Mickey, Donald & Goofy	"Clock Tower"	Mickey, Donald, and Goofy open a shop to fix clocks. They are tricked by Pete into fixing Big Beth. All of these elements were dropped in favor of cleaning Big Beth. The Big Beth element was kept and released in 1937 as "Clock Cleaners".
Mickey Mouse	"The Dog Show"	Dropped elements from a released cartoon titled "Society Dog Show", including the original title. Pete was originally considered for the role of the judge. The Good Housekeeping page suggested that Donald helps Mickey prepare Pluto for the show, but the studio record did not match the Good Housekeeping page.
Mickey, Donald & Goofy	"The Janitors"	Mickey, Donald, and Goofy work in a store, cleaning it overnight.
Mickey, Donald & Goofy	"Jungle Mickey"	(Version 1:) Mickey is a solo newsreel photographer in darkest Africa. (Version 2:) Mickey, Donald, and Goofy are newsreel photographers in darkest Africa.
Mickey, Donald & Goofy	"The Legionaires"	Mickey, Donald, and Goofy join the French Foreign Legion.
Mickey Mouse	"Mickey's Follies"	(Not be confused with the 1929 short of same name) a large and ambitious projected short featuring nearly all of the original Disney characters, including Mickey and the gang, as well as some of the more popular Silly Symphonies characters, in a grand musical revue. This eventually formed the basis of the Mickey Mouse Revue show at Walt Disney World's Magic Kingdom.
Mickey Mouse	"Sargasso Sea"	Mickey Mouse visits Atlantis.
Silly Symphonies	"Japanese Symphony"	(Version 1:) Originally planned as a story, set in Japan, featuring a moth rescued from a bat. (Version 2:) A romantic story about two Japanese children, which was stalled in production.
Silly Symphonies	"Minnehaha"	A proposed sequel to "Little Hiawatha", featuring Hiawatha's female counterpart, a little Indian girl named Minnehaha. Little seems to be known about the actual plot.
Feature film	Reynard the Fox; The Romance of Reynard	Walt Disney originally considered producing an animated film featuring Reynard the Fox, but the project was cancelled because he felt that Reynard might be an unsuitable choice for a hero. Four decades later Reynard served as the inspiration for the main character in the 1973 Disney animated film Robin Hood.

=== 1938 ===
Series	Title	Description
Donald Duck	"The Delivery Boy"	Donald has to deliver a mechanical doll to a doll museum, and another package to another destination. Pluto was considered at one point to be included to help Donald with his job.
Donald Duck	"Donald Munchausen"	Donald tells his nephews a tall tale a la Baron Munchausen, about his adventures as a National Geographic photographer in Africa. He claims to have discovered a lost world of prehistoric creatures, and to have beaten King Kong in feats of strength.
Donald Duck	"Donald's Shooting Gallery"	Donald attracts his nephews to the shooting range, by offering a box of chocolates as a prize. This proposed Donald Duck short was, in theory, an alternative story to the finished 1947 cartoon "Straight Shooters".
Donald Duck	"Lost Prospectors"	Donald and Gus Goose are prospectors lost in Death Valley. Tortured by heat and thirst, they trek across the barren terrain in search of water. They encounter various mirages, including a group of Lorelei ducks lounging by a swimming pool. One of the girls sips a cool drink and beckons to them. While Donald investigates, Gus, with the aid of his lucky derby hat, discovers a strange capricious laughing spring and is able to quench his thirst. Donald tries to trap the elusive water, but is unable to get a drop.
Mickey Mouse	"Mickey's Beach Picnic"	Mickey, Goofy, and Pluto have a rough day at the beach.
Donald Duck	"The Rubber Hunter"	Donald travels to South America in order to obtain a particularly rare species of raw rubber for new tires for his car.
Mickey Mouse; Donald Duck	"Yukon Mickey" "Yukon Donald"	(Version 1:) Mickey discovers that a mischievous baby walrus has been stealing food from his cache. Chasing the little thief, he runs afoul of the walrus' giant father. When Mickey tries to placate papa walrus with a fish, the baby walrus steals it. (Version 2:) Donald discovers that a mischievous baby walrus has been stealing food from his cache. Chasing the little thief, he runs afoul of the walrus' giant father. When Donald tries to placate papa walrus with a fish, the baby walrus steals it.
Mickey Mouse; Donald Duck	"Mickey's Nephews"	A Christmas story, in which Mickey would have played Santa for the orphans.
Mickey Mouse; Donald Duck	"Mickey's Toothache"	Mickey inhales laughing gas and enters a nightmare world where he is threatened by dental equipment. As part of the nightmare Pete appears and attacks Mickey.
Mickey Mouse; Donald Duck	"Movie Makers"	Mickey is an amateur filmmaker in Hollywood, and Donald and Pluto set out to help him make films.
Mickey Mouse; Donald Duck	"Pilgrim Mickey"	Mickey is a pilgrim setting out to hunt a turkey for Thanksgiving dinner.
Mickey Mouse; Donald Duck	"The Salvagers"	(Version 1:) Mickey and Donald go treasure hunting in the deep blue sea. (Version 2:) Mickey and Pluto go treasure hunting in the deep blue sea. This version of the film's plot came about when the Mickey and Donald story failed to materialize.
Mickey Mouse; Donald Duck	"Spring Cleaning"	An attempt to bring back Bobo the Elephant from "Mickey's Elephant". Mickey is a servant, where he and Pluto clean Minnie Mouse's garden.
Mickey Mouse; Donald Duck	"Tanglefoot"	Mickey goes to the race track, where he encounters a horse with Allergic rhinitis.
Mickey Mouse; Donald Duck	"20,000 Leagues Under the Sea"	Mickey plays Captain Nemo in an undersea adventure.
Pluto	"Pluto's Robot Twin"	Mickey builds a robot dog to keep Pluto company, but the robot goes out of control. Pluto has to fight the robot to regain control of the household.
Silly Symphony Featurette	"Snow White Returns"	A sequel featurette to Snow White and the Seven Dwarfs (1937).
Feature film	Penguin Island	This proposed feature was about a fictitious island of great auks that exists off the northern coast of Europe. The story begins when a wayward Christian missionary monk accidentally lands on the island and sees the great auks as a sort of Greek pre-Christian pagan society. Partially blind, he mistakes the animals for people and baptizes them.

=== 1939 ===
Series	Title	Description
Donald Duck	"The Beaver Hunters"	Donald and Pluto go hunting for beavers, but the wily rodents foil them, even though Donald disguises himself as a tree and uses ingenious weapons, such as a rifle that fires a plumber's helper.
Donald Duck	"Donald's Elephant"	Bobo becomes Donald's pet.
Donald Duck	"Donald's Outboard Motor"	Donald has trouble with a boat motor. The plot was considered too thin, as it was one of two cartoons to be merged into the released cartoon "Put-Put Troubles".
Donald Duck	"Donald's Stratosphere Flight"	Donald has problems repairing and launching his hot air balloon.
Donald Duck	"Haunted Castle"	Donald camps outside a spooky castle but, when a strong wind blows his tent up into the air, Donald lands inside.
Donald Duck	"Museum Keeper" "Old Masters" "Donald and the Old Masters"	Donald is a museum keeper guarding a priceless collection of paintings. Some of the "paintings" in this unmade short feature Donald in various classic artworks.
Donald Duck	"Tree Surgeon"	(Version 1:) Mickey, Donald, and Goofy are tree surgeons. (Version 2:) Donald and Goofy are tree surgeons. Goofy asks for his doctor's tools as he bandages an unseen "patient"... really a tree. Donald and Goofy struggle to dope trees with laughing gas while various forest animals fight back. Eventually, Donald and Goofy inhale the laughing gas themselves, leading to a dizzy ballet around the woods and a bad fall for Donald into some poison ivy. Donald needs the next round of Goofy's bandages.
Mickey Mouse	"Balloon Race"	Mickey, Minnie, Horace, and Clarabelle participate in a balloon race against Black Pete.
Mickey Mouse	"The Band Concert"	A remake of an earlier short of the same name.
Mickey Mouse	"Ice Antics"	A remake of On Ice.
Mickey Mouse	"Mickey's Man Friday"	A remake of an earlier short of the same name.
Mickey Mouse	"Mickey's Revival Party"	An umbrella name for a project to revisit and remake several older Disney shorts.
Mickey Mouse	"Miracle Master"	Mickey becomes master of a magic lamp. The genie of the lamp continually shocks Mickey and his friends in the real world.
Mickey Mouse	"Morgan's Ghost" "Pieces of Eight" "Three Buccaneers"	Mickey, Donald, and Goofy find a treasure map and try to follow it to the end, while at the same time trying to evade Pete. At one point, story was considered for upgrading to a feature film project. Elements of this unmade project were saved for the Donald Duck comic book story Donald Duck Finds Pirate Gold.
Mickey Mouse	"Mountain Carvers"	Mickey, Donald, and Goofy as artisans attempting to carve out their own version of Mount Rushmore.
Pluto	"Pluto and the Springs"	Pluto has trouble with a worm at the springs. The plot was considered too thin, as it was one of two cartoons to be merged into the released cartoon "Put-Put Troubles".
Pluto	"Pluto's Pal Bobo"	Pluto and Bobo are rivals for Mickey's attention, which is focused on a howdah that he built.
Silly Symphonies	"The Flying Mouse"	A remake of an earlier short of the same name.
Silly Symphonies	"Goldilocks and the Three Bears"	An adaptation of the fairy tale of the same name directed by Hugh Harman and outsourced to Harman-Ising Productions. Scrapped due to RKO's intervention and sold to Metro-Goldwyn-Mayer, where it was completed after Harman was hired.
Silly Symphonies	"Grasshopper and the Ants"	A remake of an earlier short of the same name.
Silly Symphonies	The Little Goldfish	Directed by Rudolf Ising and outsourced to Harman-Ising Productions. Scrapped due to RKO's intervention and sold to Metro-Goldwyn-Mayer, where it was completed after Ising was hired.
Silly Symphonies	"Lullaby Land"	A remake of an earlier short of the same name.
Silly Symphonies	"Santa's Workshop"	A remake of an earlier short of the same name.
Short film	Abdul Abulbul Amir	The story of two valiant heroes, a Russian, Ivan Skavinsky Skavar, and one of the Shah's mamelukes, Abdul Abulbul Amir, who, because of their pride, end up in a fight and kill each other.
Short film	Jabberwocky	The nonsense world of Lewis Carroll is brought to life in this short.

== 1940s ==
=== 1940 ===
Series	Title	Description
Donald Duck	"Traveling Salesman Donald"	Donald is a traveling salesman who cons bartender Pete into buying a phony pearl, then becomes the victim of Pete's energetic revenge. The tables are turned when Pete accidentally knocks down a pillar supporting the second story of his saloon and must hold up a heavy safe to keep from being crushed.
Mickey Mouse	"Men in Uniform"	Mickey is a milkman who is foiled by a small kitten.
Short film	Penelope and the Twelve Months	A proposed short film featuring a young girl who travels through time with the aid of a magic grandfather clock.
Fantasia	Fantasia segments	After the release of Fantasia, Walt Disney originally planned to have the film in continual release, but with new segments with replacing the older ones. However, the idea was scrapped after Fantasia failed at the box office and the idea was never revisited for the remainder of Disney's lifetime, although he produced spiritual successors such as Make Mine Music (1946) and Melody Time (1948).

=== 1941 ===
Series	Title	Description
Donald Duck	"Calling Dr. Duck"	Donald is a tree surgeon. The plot is very similar to the earlier "Tree Surgeon".
Donald & Goofy	"Ditch Diggers"	Donald and Goofy work in construction for Pete.
Donald Duck	"Sculptor Donald"	Donald enters a contest for the best wax sculpture, but his nephews sabotage his statue with a blow torch.
Health for America	"Public Enemy No. 1"	An unproduced Health for America educational short about how flies spread disease. The plot of this film is very similar to "The Winged Scourge".
Mickey Mouse	"Mickey's Elopement"	Mickey tries to help Minnie escape her stern Uncle Mortimer's house so he can get her to a quickie wedding chapel.
Feature film	Chanticleer	A rooster believes his crowing makes the sun rise.
Feature film	Don Quixote	A man named Alonso Quixano (or Quijano), a retired country gentleman nearing 50 years old, lives in an unnamed section of La Mancha with his niece and a housekeeper. He has become obsessed with books of chivalry, and believes their every word to be true, despite the fact that many of the events in them are clearly impossible. Quixano eventually appears to other people to have lost his mind from little sleep and food, and so much reading. He decides to become a knight-errant, and with his fat, food-loving, squire Sancho Panza, sets out on an hilarious misadventure.
Feature film	The Hound of Florence; Inspector Bones	Based on the novel by Felix Salten (who was also the author of Bambi, a Life in the Woods), the story is about a detective who turns into a dog. The dog detective in "Inspector Bones" was a direct parody of Basil Rathbone's role in the Sherlock Holmes films, which were very popular in the 1940s. Inspector Bones and Dr. Beagle are pitted against either Professor Mongrel ("The Mad Dog of London") or Sir Cyril Sealyham. The story would have featured Tex Avery-style self-referential jokes. The project later inspired the 1959 live-action comedy The Shaggy Dog.

=== 1942 ===
Series	Title	Description
Donald Duck	"Donald's Tank"	While cleaning an armored tank, Donald accidentally explodes some grenades near his sergeant, Black Pete. To escape Pete's wrath, he takes off in the tank, crashing through the officer's mess and separating a general from his T-bone steak. Donald's problems are compounded when an experimental television monitor inside the tank is activated, and he confuses its telecast for scenes of the passing terrain. Straying across the French line, he spoils a surprise attack on Adolf Hitler's Panzer division.
Donald Duck	"Guerilla Duck"	A continuation of Donald's wartime exploits has him trying to intercept a Japanese troop carrier.
Donald Duck	"Madame XX"	On a mission to deliver secret plans to the war office, private Donald Duck is waylaid by a Garboesque foreign spy Madame XX. She steals the plans and escapes in a motorboat, but Donald pursues her and ultimately recovers the stolen plans.
Donald Duck	"A Brazilian Symphony: Caxangá"	Donald, José Carioca (the parrot from Saludos Amigos), and Goofy attempt to play "caxangá", or the Brazilian matchbox game; Donald is constantly driven to the point of madness in his attempt to master this complex, nerve-wracking game.
Goofy	"How to Be a Cowboy"	A projected "how-to' short featuring Goofy as the chief cowboy on a dude ranch. A similar concept would be used for the short Two-Gun Goofy.
Wartime	"Army Psycho-Therapy"	An unproduced army training film dealing with stress, the adrenal glands, and the importance of discipline.
Short film	The Blue Orchid	Based on Venezuelan folklore about animals and spirits in the jungle who repel their vision of man.
Short film	Chichicastenango	A surreal visual tour of Chichicastenango.
Short film	A House Divided	A proposed wartime short about rationing, pitting the Big Bad Wolf as a black marketeer against the Three Little Pigs, who have to be taught not to waste resources.
Short film	The Lady with the Rad Pomom	A Tauchan Bird encounters an Aracuan Bird, and they fight over the lady with the Rad Pomom.
Short film	Lima Story	Adventurous Lima finds himself in the South American Lake Titicaca. Elements of this story ended up in Saludos Amigos.
Goofy	Lumberjack Goofy	Goofy chops down a tree that fails on him, and he gets stuck on the band of the power saw.
Short film	The Near-Sighted Overbird	The hero of the story is nearsighted, which continuously causes him trouble. He mistakes a wineskin for his home.
Feature film	The Ostrich Who Laid the Golden Egg	In a tale told by the Ostrich People of Prax when asked "Where did you come from?", there seems to be nothing conclusive about the tale.

Note: Disney studios produced an animated sequence for Samuel Goldwyn's film Up in Arms, which was unused in the final version of the film.

=== 1943 ===
Series	Title	Description
Goofy	"Army Story"	In the Army, Goofy becomes romantically involved with a pretty WAC.
Goofy	"How to Be a Commando"	A proposed Goofy World War II short wherein Goofy dreams of going up against Adolf Hitler and goes through commando training camps to achieve his goal.
Pluto	"The Good Samaritan"	Pluto rescues a cute little puppy from the snow, who subsequently begins to tear the house apart, and Pluto has to rescue him again.
Private Snafu	"Snafu"	Proposed Private Snafu shorts were planned by Disney and Frank Capra, but was turned down by the United States Army when Disney demanded commercial rights to the character and a high production cost. Disney did end up using Snafu in some A Few Quick Facts shorts.
Wartime	Ajax the Stool Pigeon; Roland XIII	A short that was to feature a bird performing as a military carrier pigeon, despite having a fear of heights.
Wartime	Democracy	A proposed wartime short comparing American democracy with the society of Nazi Germany through the trials of an immigrant family, the Joneses.
Wartime	Melting Pot	An unmade propaganda short with a Nazi lecturer extolling the virtues of the German way. This might be an alternate version of "Education for Death".
Wartime	The Square World	This proposed wartime short satires the conformist society of Nazi Germany. This was considered to be extended into a feature film project at one point.
Bambi	Bambi's Children	A sequel to the original Bambi film, dealing with Bambi's adult life.
Feature film	The Gremlins	(Version 1:) A feature film based on the novel by Roald Dahl of the same name about Gremlins that wreck airplanes. (Version 2:) A short film based on the novel by Roald Dahl of the same name about Gremlins that wreck airplanes. The short was proposed after plans for a feature film adaptation fell apart. Warner Bros. eventually released the Bugs Bunny short Falling Hare and Russian Rhapsody using the same premise.
Feature film	The Tales of Hans Christian Andersen	The film was intended to be a co-production with Samuel Goldwyn, who also wanted to produce a film based on Andersen's life. It was decided at some point that part of the film would be shot in live action, with animated segments depicting some of Andersen's tales. These included The Emperor's New Clothes, The Emperor's Nightingale, Through the Picture Frame, The Little Fir-Tree, The Steadfast Tin Soldier, and The Little Mermaid.

=== 1944 ===
Series	Title	Description
Donald Duck	"La Loca Mariposa"	Donald is a butterfly collector visiting the country of Venezuela.
Mickey Mouse	"Intros and Outros"	Mickey presents the CIAA Health for America series. Note: These intros would have gone by the name of the actual CIAA films.
Pluto	"Pluto and the Anteater"	Pluto encounters an aardvark in South America in a very strange manner.

=== 1945 ===
Series	Title	Description
Feature film	Chanticleer and Reynard	The stories of Chanticleer the rooster and Reynard the fox are featured in the same film after plans fail in each of the earlier attempts to bring them separately to the screen.

=== 1946 ===
Series	Title	Description
Donald Duck	"Caxanga"	Version 1: Donald's heart is captured by a female parrot after his frustration over the South American game caxanga. Version 2: Donald and Goofy are introduced by Jose to the game of caxanga. Frustrated over the game, Donald throws a tantrum. The next night, he cannot get the game out of his head.
Donald Duck	"Share and Share Alike"	Donald and his three nephews fight over an apple. Pencil tests for this proposed short still exist.
Donald Duck	"Trouble Shooters"	Donald Duck is a telephone and power linesman who has some trouble with the same woodpecker that once destroyed his camera.
(n/a)	Don Quixote: Fantastic Variations on a Theme of Knightly Character for Large Orchestra	This proposed short is another take on the Don Quixote tale. This time, the Disney animators set it around Richard Strauss' tone poem.
(n/a)	Fiesta of the Flowers	Depicts the botanical action of the flowers on South America.
(n/a)	On the Trail	Ferde Grofé's Grand Canyon Suite is brought to life, set in the light and color of southern desert.
Feature film	Carnival Surprise Package; Cuban Carnival	A proposed third South of the Border Disney feature film. The segments would have included: "Brazilian Rhapsody", an extended version of what would later become "Blame it on the Samba", released as part of Melody Time in 1948; "The Laughing Gauchito" featuring the character first seen in "The Three Caballeros", who learns he has the ability to shatter glass with his laugh. He becomes a star, but his fame ends when his voice deepens as he becomes a man; "San Blas Boy" is about a boy named Chico and his dog Kiki, who are lost in a storm. "Cape Dance" was a surreal colourful fantasy; "Rancho in the Sky", and four others featuring Donald Duck, José Carioca, Panchito Pistoles, and a newly introduced small rooster from Cuba; Miguelito Maracas.
(n/a)	Sonja Henie Fantasy	A proposed Fantasia short would have been either animated or a live action/animation mix featuring the famed ice skater.

=== 1947 ===
Series	Title	Description
Donald Duck; Goofy	"Cowpoke Donald" "Old Geronimo"	Version 1: Donald sets out to capture the roughest, toughest steer in the whole state of Texas. Version 2: Goofy sets out to capture the roughest, toughest steer in the whole state of Texas.
Goofy	"How to Train a Dog"	Goofy tries to teach Pluto some new tricks.
Mickey Mouse	"Mickey and Claudius the Bee"	Mickey is shrunk to the size of a bee and is given a tour of the hive by Claudius.
Short Film	Trees with Faces	A one-shot animated short that was supposed to be about the life of Native Americans, featuring animated bits about the raven's mischief.

Note: Fun and Fancy Free, released in 1947, was originally planned to be two separate feature films.

=== 1948 ===
Series	Title	Description
Pluto	"Pluto's White Elephant"	Pluto encounters Bobo in the last attempt to bring Bobo back onto the screen. Little is known about the plot.
Pluto	"Scrambled Eggs"	Pluto encounters the Ugly Duckling. This story was dropped from production for unknown reasons.
Feature film	Tintin	In 1948, Hergé wrote to Walt Disney hoping he would adapt the Adventures of Tintin comic strip into a potential animated feature. Gil Souto, a publicity director for Disney, turned down the proposal as Disney was occupied with Cinderella at this time, though Hergé did receive a Mickey Mouse trophy and a picture showing Tintin and Mickey shaking hands decades later.

=== 1949 ===
Series	Title	Description
Feature film	Currier and Ives	Planned for release sometime in the late 1940s, it was to be a "combination film" (live action mixed with animation). It was eventually dropped because the cost involved would have been too high. At the time, there had been a slate of combination pictures with the box office, each being less than its predecessor.
Feature film	Hiawatha	Hiawatha was a follower of The Great Peacemaker, a prophet and spiritual leader, who proposed the unification of the Iroquois people. This proposed feature was considered to be taken in a similar direction as Fantasia, though it would feature a single story line.

Note: The Adventures of Ichabod and Mr. Toad, released in 1949, was originally planned to be two separate feature films.

== 1950s ==
=== 1951 ===
Series	Title	Description
Mickey Mouse	"Plight of the Bumble Bee"	Mickey produces a stage musical number with Hector the Bee.
Mickey Mouse	"The Talking Dog"	Pluto gets roped into becoming a ventriloquist's dummy in a circus sideshow. When Mickey figures out that his dog is missing, he starts looking for him and finds him in the hands of Pete. Mickey battles Pete to get Pluto back. Some animation that was done on this short was dropped. It was animated for a pencil test.
Feature film	Don Quixote	A second attempt for this proposed feature film had the same basic plot as the 1940 take on the Don Quixote story, but the animation would have had a similar style as seen in UPA animated shorts and features of the time.

=== 1955 ===
Series	Title	Description
Donald Duck	"Money-sorting Machine" "Donald-Scrooge Opus"	Donald works at Scrooge's Money Bin, operating a money-sorting machine that runs by power. When Donald is away at lunch, the radio announces a plague of rats is loose in the city. Scrooge closes and shutters all of his windows and bolts the door. He sits down, terrified, to eat his cheese sandwich but, before he can begin, he is besieged by a determined rat who has smelled the cheese from afar. The rat threatens to destroy a $10,000-dollar bill if Scrooge does not order the most expensive cheese in the world.
Feature film	Babes in Toyland	Walt Disney announced the film in 1955 as an animated feature. In 1956, he said he wanted to make it the following year, and assigned Bill Walsh to produce and Sidney Miller to direct. Filming was delayed, then the project was reactivated as the live-action 1961 movie of the same name.

=== 1959 ===
Series	Title	Description
(n/a)	Prairie Rhythm; Pretty Red Wing	A planned satire of the classic Western film stereotypes about an Indian girl and a white trapper.
Short film	Barefoot Boy	This proposed short film was to be an adaptation of the John Greenleaf Whittier poem set in Norman Rockwell's "Never Land".

== 1960s ==
=== 1960 ===
Series	Title	Description
Feature film	The Emperor's Nightingale	This proposed film would have used paper cut-out animation to tell the traditional tale, but with a much finer and more delicate Asian style than the earlier 1959 short Noah's Ark. At one point, Mickey Mouse was considered to be included in the plot.
Feature film	Chanticleer	Having just completed One Hundred and One Dalmatians, Ken Anderson and Marc Davis were looking for new ideas for the studio's next feature in which they located earlier conceptual artwork from the 1940s and attempted to adapt the story into an animated film. However, it was ruled that only one film would go into production at the time, and Chanticleer was turned down once again when the studio decided to go for Bill Peet's adaptation of The Sword in the Stone.

=== 1963 ===
Series	Title	Description
Feature film	Goldilocks and the Three Bears	This proposed feature was to be an adaptation of "Goldilocks and the Three Bears", involving a little girl who breaks into the bears' house.
Feature film	Little Red Riding Hood	This proposed feature was to be an adaptation of the Charles Perrault's tale "Little Red Riding Hood", involving a little girl who tries to travel to her grandmother, but she is pursued by a wolf.

=== 1967 ===
Series	Title	Description
Feature film	Hansel and Gretel	This proposed feature was to be an adaptation of the Brothers Grimm's tale "Hansel and Gretel", involving a brother and a sister threatened by a cannibalistic witch living deep in the forest in a house constructed of cake and gingerbread.

=== 1969 ===
Series	Title	Description
Feature film	The Bremen Town Musicians	The story about a donkey, a dog, a cat, and a rooster, all past their prime years in life and usefulness on their respective farms, who are soon to be discarded or mistreated by their masters. One by one they leave their homes and set out together. They decide to go to Bremen, known for its freedom, to live without owners and become musicians.
Feature film	Hootsie the Owl; Wise Little Owl	A second attempt of this proposed feature about a misfit owl who sleeps at night and is awake during the day because he hatched during the day. He is an embarrassment to his parents and has no friends. This is basically the same plot as the "Hootsie the Owl" short proposed in 1940, but with the addition of a snake character, similar to Kaa in The Jungle Book.

== 1970s ==
=== 1973 ===
Series	Title	Description
Feature film	Scruffy	An adaptation of the children's book by Paul Gallico, the story centered around the titular Barbary ape, who is the honorable leader of a family of apes. Set during World War II, off the coast of Gibraltar, Scruffy falls in love with Amelia, a pampered pet ape, and together they evade capture from the Nazis. When the time came to approve the project, the studio leaders decided to approve The Rescuers for production.

=== 1976 ===
Series	Title	Description
Feature film	The Hero from Otherwhere	Based on the book by Jay Williams, it was conceived as a live action/animated film about two schoolboys with different attributes who are transported to a strange planet whose leader persuades them to help destroy the wolf Fenris that has been ravaging the land.

== 1980s ==
=== 1980 ===
Series	Title	Description
Feature film	Musicana	An early version of what eventually became Fantasia 2000. Some segments of the planned film were to be titled "Finlandia", involving a fight between the Ice God and Sun Goddess; an African segment about a curious monkey and a Rain God, including many hippos, lions and elephants; "The Emperor's Nightingale", based on the Andersen story, which would have starred Mickey Mouse as the keeper of the nightingale; a southern jazz story titled "By the Bayou", which included many frogs, including caricatures of Ella Fitzgerald and Louis Armstrong; a segment set in the Andes with a beautiful girl/bird; and a version of "Ali Baba and the Forty Thieves", featuring tropical birds. It was cut due to financial issues in favor of The Fox and the Hound and The Black Cauldron.
Feature film	The Little Broomstick	A few months after Mary Stewart's novel of the same name was published in 1971, Walt Disney Productions acquired the film rights. In 1980, director Wolfgang "Woolie" Reitherman decided to adapt it into an animated feature following the release of The Fox and the Hound, but studio management felt the project was too similar to Bedknobs and Broomsticks. Also, they wanted the animation department to produce more ambitious films such as The Black Cauldron. In 2017, the book was adapted into the Japanese animated film Mary and the Witch's Flower by Studio Ponoc as their first film.

=== 1981 ===
Series	Title	Description
Feature film	Catfish Bend	Based on the book series by Ben Lucien Burman, it follows the journey of several animal residents in Catfish Bend. Following several treatments, it was never greenlit for production, and Disney dropped its option on the books.

=== 1983 ===
Series	Title	Description
Mickey Mouse	The Three Musketeers	Storyboard artists Steve Hulett and Pete Young developed the project with Mickey Mouse, Donald Duck, Goofy, and José Carioca as the Musketeers, but it fell into development hell. However, in 2004, Mickey, Donald, Goofy: The Three Musketeers was released, but it was unrelated to the earlier project.
Feature film	Where the Wild Things Are	This was to be a film adaptation of the children's picture book written and illustrated by Maurice Sendak. Animators Glen Keane and John Lasseter (who later moved on to Pixar) completed a test film blending traditionally animated characters with computer-generated settings, but the project proceeded no further. However, a live-action film adaptation, distributed by Warner Bros. and directed by Spike Jonze was released twenty-six years later.

=== 1985 ===
Series	Title	Description
Feature film	Mistress Masham's Repose	Before the release of The Black Cauldron, producer Joe Hale and his production team were working on an adaptation of the T. H. White novel. While Roy E. Disney supported the project, Jeffrey Katzenberg disliked it. Eventually, Hale and most of the team were fired, and the project languished.

=== 1986 ===
Series	Title	Description
Feature film	Dufus	Then-Disney CEO Michael Eisner proposed that Disney Feature Animation should develop an animated adaptation of The Catcher in the Rye, since Eisner was a fan of the original book. However, knowing that J. D. Salinger would refuse to sell the film rights, Eisner then suggested to do an animated film that dealt with similar topics from the book, but with German shepherds as the characters. The film was briefly mentioned in the Disney+ film Howard; where in 1986, lyricist Howard Ashman was sent a letter from then-Disney studio chairman Jeffrey Katzenberg in regards to collaborating with the studio on one of their films. Dufus was listed, alongside a sequel to Mary Poppins and The Little Mermaid.

=== 1988 ===
Series	Title	Description
Feature film	Army Ants	Disney considered producing an animated feature film that centered on a pacifist ant living in a militaristic colony. However, the idea never fully materialized. This idea, however, was reincarnated ten years later into DreamWorks' Antz and the unrelated Pixar's A Bug's Life.
Winnie the Pooh	Untitled Winnie the Pooh film	When one of her novels came to the attention of a Disney executive, Linda Woolverton was hired to work on several animated projects, including one involving Winnie the Pooh. However, it was later shelved once The New Adventures of Winnie the Pooh had aired.

=== 1989 ===
Series	Title	Description
Mickey Mouse	Swabbies	The story found Mickey, Donald, and Goofy out of work, out of luck, and in need of a job. They enlist in the Navy and go to boot camp with Pete as their exasperated drill instructor. They meet their feminine counterparts—Minnie, Daisy and Clarabelle—who are all WAVES. After they put to sea, they encounter a submarine full of the Beagle Boys, who all speak a Russian-sounding gibberish. The entire film was storyboarded and recorded, and an animatic was created. Complete model sheets of all of the characters were printed, and layouts and some animation had begun before the project came to an abrupt halt.

== 1990s ==
=== 1990 ===
Series	Title	Description
Roger Rabbit	Who Discovered Roger Rabbit	As the proposed prequel to the 1988 Disney/Amblin film, Who Framed Roger Rabbit, the film, which previously went by the working title, Roger Rabbit Two: The Toon Platoon, was set in 1941 during World War II, and would have had Roger Rabbit and Baby Herman going on a journey through the perils of the war in search of Roger's birth parents in the Americas. It would have been a direct-to-video musical film.
Goofy	Goofy of the Apes	A spoof of Tarzan of the Apes starring Goofy.
Horace Horsecollar	Maximum Horsepower	In the 1990s, Horace Horsecollar was intended to star in a new television series for The Disney Afternoon, intended to explain his disappearance from cartoons since the 1930s. The concept would be that, in 1939, Horace had grown tired of playing bit parts and, and upon learning that Mickey was going to appear in Fantasia, he would demand Walt Disney to give him a featured role as well. However, on his way to Disney's office, Horace gets abducted by aliens who are in desperate need of the hero that they believe Horace is. Nevertheless, Horace dreams of returning to Earth and resuming his acting career.

=== 1991 ===
Series	Title	Description
Feature film	Humphrey the Whale	An animated adaptation of the children's book Humphrey the Lost Whale by Richard Hall and Wendy Tokuda.
Feature film	Puss in Boots	A film version of the tale. It is unrelated to the released DreamWorks Animation film of the same title, especially since this one was more connected to the original fairy tale.
Feature film	Tiny the Alligator	It was described as a "growing up story" of a resident of New York City who happens to be the size of an 18-wheeler.
Short film	A Tin Toy Christmas	A half-hour television sequel to the short Tin Toy was considered, but Pixar felt convinced they could produce a feature film. The project later became Toy Story.

=== 1992 ===
Series	Title	Description
Mickey Mouse	Mickey Columbus	Mickey, Donald, and Goofy were cast as the captains of the Niña, the Pinta and the Santa Maria, and Minnie stands in for Queen Isabella I of Castile. The film's writers could not decide what to do about the Native Americans that Columbus would encounter in the New World.
Mickey Mouse	Mickey's Arabian Nights	A featurette starring Mickey, Minnie, Donald, Daisy and Goofy, set around the entire One Thousand and One Nights anthology.
Mickey Mouse	Tourist Trap	Based on an idea for a scrapped Roger Rabbit short, Mickey and Donald are heading on a vacation, with Donald attempting to kill Mickey.
Feature film	Homer's Odyssey	A feature film set around the odyssey of Odysseus. The project was scrapped when it failed to translate into animation comedy.
Feature film	Sinbad the Sailor	This proposed feature film, itself based on the Arabian Nights tale of the same name, was scrapped after Aladdin was released.
Feature film	Song of the Sea	Composer Stephen Flaherty and lyricist Lynn Ahrens had pitched the project as a re-telling of the mythological story of Orpheus and Eurydice, but with humpback whales. In March 1992, The New York Times had reported that both had signed on to compose songs for the project. Gary Trousdale and Kirk Wise were to direct, but the project was dropped when they were recruited to work on The Hunchback of Notre Dame.
Feature film	Swan Lake	The project was dropped because former Disney animation director Richard Rich was developing The Swan Princess.
Feature film	Silly Hillbillies on Mars	Based on the idea of feuding hillbillies from outer space, it was inspired by a Disney storyman who saw the title of a Disney short, "The Martins and The Coys", mistaking it for "The Martians and The Cows".

=== 1993 ===
Series	Title	Description
Feature film	The Man Who Would Be King	An adaptation of the Rudyard Kipling short story.
Feature film	A Princess of Mars	During the 1990s, Jeffrey Katzenberg attempted to produce an animated adaptation of the novel. After he had disapproved of Ron Clements and John Musker's pitch for Treasure Planet, Katzenberg instead offered them to direct A Princess of Mars. However, the directors were uninterested, and Disney relinquished the film rights to Paramount Pictures in 2002. By 2008, Paramount's film rights had expired and the project, now directed by WALL-E and Finding Nemo director Andrew Stanton, entered production under Disney once again. The finished project, titled John Carter, was released 19 years later on March 1, 2012, to mixed reviews. The film became one of the biggest box-office bombs of all time. Stanton initially conceived John Carter as the first in a trilogy of sequels, which were all cancelled due to the film's diminishing box-office returns.

=== 1994 ===
Series	Title	Description
Roger Rabbit	Hare in My Soup	A fourth Roger Rabbit cartoon short based on Who Framed Roger Rabbit was planned for release in 1995, to coincide with the release of Toy Story, preceding that proposed feature film in the process. It was canceled after pre-production ended and before production could begin, and was replaced in the gap with a reissue of Rollercoaster Rabbit. This cartoon was supposed to be followed by three more Roger Rabbit shorts, also starring Baby Herman; Clean and Oppressed, Beach Blanket Bay and Bronco Bustin' Bunny.

=== 1996 ===
Series	Title	Description
Feature film	Toots and the Upside Down House	Based on the book by Carol Hughes, it tells of a young girl who creates a fantasy world of goblins, fairies, sprites, and an evil Jack Frost. The film's production was canceled when Disney shut the film's animation production company Skellington Productions after the box office failure of James and the Giant Peach.

=== 1998 ===
Series	Title	Description
(n/a)	Totally Twisted Fairy Tales	Conceived as a direct-to-video project of four featurettes developed by Walt Disney Television Animation, it included Jack and the Beanstalk, Redux Riding Hood, a remake of 1933's Three Little Pigs, and a fourth cartoon that was never finalized. Jack and the Beanstalk was written by Peter Tolan and George Carlin was cast in an unspecified role, but it never went pass post-production. "Three Little Pigs" was written and directed by Frank Conniff and Darrell Rooney respectively, starred Harvey Fierstein as the wolf, and was completed but never released. Redux Riding Hood itself was nominated for Academy Award for Best Animated Short Film at the 70th Academy Awards.

=== 1999 ===
Series	Title	Description
Pepper Ann	Pepper Ann's Rio Adventure	In 1999, a theatrical animated film based on the Disney's One Saturday Morning series Pepper Ann was in development at Walt Disney Television Animation and Walt Disney Pictures under the name Pepper Ann's Rio Adventure. The movie would have followed Pepper Ann's soccer team being invited to Rio de Janeiro as part of an event where they try to stop a land developer to deforest the Amazon River. The movie was scrapped for unknown reasons. However, concept art of the film by animation director Richard Bowman was discovered on eBay in February 2025.

== 2000s ==
=== 2000 ===
Series	Title	Description
Feature film	Bitsy	The story focused on the eponymous elephant who leaves India to try to make it in Hollywood, and ends up working in a used-car lot and falling in love. Veteran story artists Joe Grant and Burny Mattinson developed the first act through storyboards. After the twenty-minute pitch meeting, the executives were reluctant to approve the pitch.
Feature film	Wild Life	Loosely based on George Bernard Shaw's play Pygmalion, the movie was to tell the story of an elephant who becomes a sensation on the New York club circuit. In the fall of 2000, Roy E. Disney watched a work-in-progress screening and was so appalled by the film's adult humor that he immediately ordered production to be shut down.

=== 2001 ===
Series	Title	Description
Atlantis	Atlantis II	Prior to the release of Atlantis: The Lost Empire, directors Gary Trousdale and Kirk Wise were in development of a theatrical sequel to the film. The plot was to have been about a masked Darth Vader-like villain who attempts to re-take Atlantis, only to be revealed as Helga Sinclair. However, the project was cancelled and a 2003 sequel titled Atlantis: Milo's Return was released.
Atlantis	Team Atlantis	It was also planned to adapt Atlantis: The Lost Empire into an animated television series produced by Disney Television Animation. Tad Stones was the series' showrunner, and in an interview, he claimed they were well into development with half the scripts written. However, on July 13, 2001, Barry Blumberg, then-president of Disney Television Animation, walked into a room and declared, "You've got to shut down the show." The series' pause in development was attributed due to the film's poor box office performance. At the time of its cancellation, three episodes were finished and were later released direct-to-video as Atlantis: Milo's Return. One of the unfinished episodes would have crossovered with Gargoyles.
Feature film	Don Quixote	A third attempt to adapt the novel that was under development by Paul and Gaëtan Brizzi who aimed for a more adult take, but the project was never approved.
Dumbo	Dumbo II	Disney planned a proposed direct-to-video sequel to Dumbo. The plot was to follow Dumbo and his circus friends who navigate through a large city after being left behind by their traveling circus and trying to find their way home. It was also supposed to explain what happened to Dumbo's father. The trailer was included on the Dumbo: 60th Anniversary Edition DVD. In 2002, the project was placed on hold after Joe Grant found the computer-animated test footage for the film to be lackluster. In 2005, the project was placed back into production, but was cancelled by John Lasseter a year later after being named Creative Officer. Additionally, a third Dumbo film would be planned if the sequel ever came to be.
Hercules	Hercules II: The Trojan War	Disney planned a proposed direct-to-video sequel to Hercules. Hercules is now living in Athens with Megara and their daughter, Hebe. However, when an old friend named Helen is captured by the evil Paris of Troy, Hercules joins the united Greek army as they head out to war. However, this war will create revelations, and Hercules finds an old friend who eventually goes missing.
Feature film	Stoneflight	Based on the children's book by Georgess McHargue, the story follows a lonely girl seeking refuge from her parents who befriends a lonely gargoyle at the roof of her Manhattan brownstone. The gargoyle then transports her to Central Park where other gargoyles have convened with other children from troubled families.
Feature film	The Frog Prince	A satirical adaptation of the Brothers Grimm fairy tale, The Frog Prince. It was developed by Eric Goldberg and his wife, Sue, and it was pitched to then-Feature Animation president Thomas Schumacher who rejected it feeling that a satirical animated feature would not be popular with audiences. Disney eventually revived The Frog Prince project, which became The Princess and the Frog.
The Nightmare Before Christmas	The Nightmare Before Christmas 2	Disney planned to make a sequel to The Nightmare Before Christmas, but instead of using stop motion, Disney wanted to use 3D CGI animation. However, Tim Burton convinced Disney to drop the idea.

=== 2002 ===
Series	Title	Description
Feature film	Antonius	The project follows the story of a leopard in ancient Egypt who becomes a freedom fighter.
Feature film	The Emperor's Nightingale	Written by Robert Reece, this version of the Hans Christian Andersen story would have been set in India.
Feature film	The Fool's Errand	The story is said to have centered on a court jester who goes on a mythical journey to return peace to his kingdom.
Mickey Mouse	The Search for Mickey Mouse	In honor of Mickey Mouse's 75th anniversary, the project was about Mickey Mouse getting "mousenapped" by unknown forces. Minnie Mouse hires Basil of Baker Street to investigate his disappearance. They, along with Donald Duck and Goofy, travel around the world to find Mickey. Along the way, they come across several characters from Disney's animated film canon, including Alice, Peter Pan, Robin Hood, and Aladdin. The film was initially scheduled for a 2002 release, but it was cancelled due to script issues as the multiple cameos were considered too gimmicky. The project was later replaced by Mickey, Donald, Goofy: The Three Musketeers.
Treasure Planet	Treasure Planet II	The cancelled direct-to-video sequel to the original film. In the sequel, Jim Hawkins and Kate, his love interest and classmate at the Royal Interstellar Academy, must team with Long John Silver to stop the villainous Ironbeard from freeing the inmates of Botany Bay Prison Asteroid. Willem Dafoe was set to voice Ironbeard. The sequel was canceled after Treasure Planet bombed at the box office.
(n/a)	Pepe the Bull	In 2002, Jorge R. Gutierrez and Sandra Equihua, creators of El Tigre: The Adventures of Manny Rivera, had pitched an animated series titled Pepe the Bull to Disney Television Animation. If it had been approved, it could have been Disney's first ever Flash-animated series, but instead it was The Buzz on Maggie, which Gutierrez provided character designs for. Gutierrez claimed that the project was not picked up because the producers wanted the series to be about Pepe's sister. They were willing to greenlight the project, but he declined.

=== 2003 ===
Series	Title	Description
Brother Bear	Brother Bear: The Series	Disney Television Animation was set to produce a television series titled Brother Bear: The Series for Disney Channel. The Simpsons veteran Pete Michels was to helm the series and was allowed to watch an incomplete version of the film so that he could construct a pilot. The series would have taken place directly after the events of the film and would have seen Kenai and Koda adopt other orphaned animals into their family. Jeremy Suarez, Rick Moranis and Dave Thomas were to reprise their respective roles, while Will Friedle would have replaced Joaquin Phoenix as Kenai. While the pilot tested well, it was not picked up because the Disney Channel executives felt that the series was "counterproductive" to their goal of reaching a tween audience, combined with the fact that the film performed below expectations at the box office.
The Jungle Book	The Jungle Book 3	In 2003, a third installment to The Jungle Book was planned. It would have been about Baloo and Shere Khan being captured and sold off to a Russian circus, and Mowgli, Shanti, Ranjan, and Bagheera deciding to save them both. Over the course of the film, Shere Khan regrets his hatred against humanity because of his capture, and eventually reforms, but the project never materialized.
The Jungle Book	Mowgli and Baloo's Jungle Jams	In 2003, cartoonist John Fountain was asked by Disney Television Animation to adapt The Jungle Book into a potential animated television series. He wrote a pitch bible titled Mowgli and Baloo's Jungle Jams.
Feature film	My Peoples	While being produced at Walt Disney Feature Animation Florida, this proposed feature film was to be about two young lovers named Elgin Harper and Rose McGee. They are both from two rival families in Appalachia during the late 1940s. A group of mountain spirits inhabiting folk art dolls do what they can to bring the two of them together. Mixing traditional and computer-generated animation, it went through several title changes, including A Few Good Ghosts, Angel and Her No Good Sister, Elgin's People, and Once in a Blue Moon. It would have been directed by Barry Cook, the co-director of Mulan. Set to a bluegrass score, its voice cast included Dolly Parton, Lily Tomlin, Hal Holbrook, and Charles Durning. Despite the well-received test screenings, on November 14, 2003, David Stainton announced in a company email that production on A Few Good Ghosts had been cancelled. Months later, Walt Disney Feature Animation Florida closed its doors on March 19, 2004.
Feature film	Tam Lin	In 2002, Roger Allers began developing a film adaptation of the Scottish fairy tale, but it was rejected after being pitched to Michael Eisner. At the time, Eisner was in a corporate struggle with Roy E. Disney, and recognized that the project was Disney's "baby". In May 2003, Sony Pictures Animation (SPA) announced that the project was being directed by Allers and Brenda Chapman, but one year later, he was later moved to co-direct SPA's first film Open Season while Chapman moved to Pixar.
Feature film	The Prince and the Pig	The project was described as a fairy tale focused on the grand adventure of a boy and his pig as they set off against all odds to try to steal the moon.
Feature film	The Three Pigs	An adaptation based on David Wiesner's book The Three Pigs. In May 2002, it was reported that the book was optioned to Walt Disney Feature Animation. In December 2003, it was announced that the project was being developed as a 2D/3D animated hybrid film.
Feature film	Uncle Stiltskin	The story begins where the famous Brothers Grimm fairy tale Rumplestiltskin leaves off. In Uncle Stiltskin, the fabled aspiring babynapper Rumplestiltskin again tries to fulfill his dream of being a father but, this time, he discovers the true meaning of family.
Feature film	Which Witch?	Based on the children's novel of the same name by Eva Ibbotson, the project tells of a fantasy adventure in which a magical wizard realizes that before he retires, he must find a wife. He holds a contest in which all the world's witches compete by performing their most outrageous spells. In October 2014, it was announced that the project is in development again at the Jim Henson Company with Billy Crystal serving as a writer, producer and star.

=== 2004 ===
Series	Title	Description
Feature film	One for Sorrow, Two for Joy	Based on the Clive Woodall novel of the same name, it is set in an imaginary kingdom of Birddom and follows the plight of a plucky robin tasked with saving the world from evil magpies. In 2004, Disney entered negotiations with Woodall to acquire the film rights in hopes of producing an animated adaptation.
Mulan	Mulan III	In 2002, a third Mulan film was announced to be in development.

=== 2005 ===
Series	Title	Description
Winnie the Pooh	Disney Learning Adventures	Originally, Disney planned to release more Winnie the Pooh Learning Adventures installments, such as Winnie the Pooh: Good Day Good Night and Winnie the Pooh: Time to Rhyme. However, these plans were ultimately scrapped after DisneyToon Studios was reorganized. The original trailer for them can be found on several Disney DVDs as well as YouTube.
Feature film	The Abandoned	Based on the children's book by Paul Gallico, the story focused on a young boy who transforms into a cat.
Feature film	Fraidy Cat	This proposed feature film was to have chronicled a frightened cat, who had already lost three of his nine lives, that finds himself trapped in a Hitchcockian plot. The project originated with Piet Kroon, but was inherited by Ron Clements and John Musker. However, David Stainton, then-president of Walt Disney Feature Animation, refused to green-light the project.
Feature film	Mr. Popper's Penguins	Based on the novel of the same name, the project was developed by Joe Grant where Eisner and Stainton wanted the project to be set in contemporary New York, to which Grant contested. The project was later moved to 20th Century Fox and was released on June 17, 2011. It starred Jim Carrey and Carla Gugino in the lead roles and received mixed reviews from critics but was a box office success.
Winnie the Pooh	Untitled Winnie the Pooh film	Screenwriter Robert Reece wrote a treatment for a Winnie the Pooh feature film. It was to center on a dilemma for one of Pooh's friends, but it was never pitched.
Aladdin	Aladdin 4	In 2005, screenwriter Robert Reece pitched a fourth Aladdin feature to Disneytoon executives, although it never came to fruition.
Toy Story	Toy Story 3	This original version of Toy Story 3 by Disney's Circle Seven Animation was to focus on Andy's mother shipping a malfunctioning Buzz to Taiwan, where he was built, as the other toys believe that he will be fixed there. After Buzz has been shipped, they find out the company has issued a massive recall. Fearing Buzz's destruction, a group of Andy's toys (Woody, Rex, Slinky, Mr. Potato Head, Hamm, Jessie, and Bullseye) venture out to rescue Buzz. At the same time, Buzz meets other toys from around the world that have been recalled, including several Transformers toys. After Disney bought Pixar in 2006, Circle Seven was shut down and their version of Toy Story 3 was cancelled. In 2010, Pixar released their own version of the Circle Seven film of the same name.
Monsters, Inc.	Monsters, Inc. 2: Lost in Scaradise	In 2005, Circle Seven Animation screenwriters Bob Hilgenberg and Rob Muir wrote a film treatment for a sequel of Monsters, Inc. The film would have focused on Mike and Sulley visiting the human world to give Boo a birthday present, only to find that she had moved. After getting trapped in the human world, Mike and Sulley split up after disagreeing on what to do. However, it was cancelled following the shutdown of Circle 7. In 2013, Pixar released a prequel, Monsters University. The studio eventually announced a third film, which will still be a sequel, to be in development in March 2026.
Finding Nemo	Finding Nemo 2	In 2005, Disney was going to make a sequel to Finding Nemo without Pixar's involvement by the now-defunct Circle Seven Animation. Although it never went into production, a script for the Circle Seven version was uploaded to the official Raindance Film Festival website in 2018. It would have focused on Nemo reuniting with Remy, his long-lost brother. Marlin later gets captured and sent to an aquarium so Nemo, Remy, and Dory venture to save him. After Disney bought Pixar in 2006, Circle Seven was shut down and their version of Finding Nemo 2 was cancelled. In 2016, Pixar released their own sequel, Finding Dory.
Tron	Untitled Tron TV series	In 2005, animation director Ciro Nieli was given the opportunity to develop an animated TV series based on Tron. Nieli, who is best known for 2012's Teenage Mutant Ninja Turtles, had previously created the series Super Robot Monkey Team Hyperforce Go! for Disney. However, plans for the Tron series ultimately fell through. According to Nieli, the pitch for the Tron series was reworked from a previous original concept of his known as "Powercade", featuring two kids who inherit electrical powers, accompanied by a creature named "Glitch".

=== 2006 ===
Series	Title	Description
Fantasia	Fantasia 2006	This would have been the third film installment in the Fantasia series. The plans were eventually dropped altogether, and proposed segments from that abandoned film were instead produced and released as individual stand-alone Disney animated shorts. One of them was the 2004 short film One by One which was added to the special edition release of The Lion King II: Simba's Pride, and the 2006 short film The Little Matchgirl which was added to the special edition release of The Little Mermaid.
The Brave Little Toaster	Untitled fourth The Brave Little Toaster film	In 2006, the official website of Hyperion Pictures posted an image of a possible fourth The Brave Little Toaster film which was supposed to use computer-animation instead of hand-drawn animation, but it was never pitched. The website has largely been inactive since then but was updated in 2019.
Chicken Little	Chicken Little: The Series	Walt Disney Television Animation developed an animated series based on Chicken Little for Disney Channel. The project was passed in favor of Phineas and Ferb according to Dan Povenmire. An animation test for the series was found in 2024. The entire script for the pilot episode would leak in June 2025.

=== 2007 ===
In June 2007, Disneytoon Studios president Sharon Morrill stepped down, and the animation studio units under the Walt Disney Company underwent corporate restructuring as the Pixar leadership assumed more control. Thus, most sequels, plus a prequel series, out of DisneyToon Studios were cancelled.

Series	Title	Description
The Aristocats	The Aristocats II	The direct-to-video sequel to the original 1970 film. The story was to have concerned Marie, Duchess's daughter, who becomes smitten by another kitten aboard a luxury cruise ship. However, she and her family must soon take on a jewel thief on the open seas.
Chicken Little	Chicken Little II	The canceled direct-to-DVD sequel to Chicken Little. The plot would have centered around Abby Mallard competing with a new schoolgirl for Chicken Little's affection.
Meet the Robinsons	Pet Project	A 6-minute short intended to be included on the film's DVD release, entailing the story of how Bowler Hat Guy was able to retrieve, raise and train a giant dinosaur to ravage against Lewis. Progress was slightly swindled when Ed Catmull said that he didn't want the studio to devote any more time with creating extra shorts for DVD releases because they "don't pay for themselves", and was eventually cancelled after the second draft animatic was completed.
Meet the Robinsons	Meet the Robinsons II	The canceled direct-to-DVD sequel to Meet the Robinsons.
Snow White	The Seven Dwarfs	At one point, Disney was developing a 3D-animated, The Lord of the Rings-like franchise series of direct-to-DVD films, which would have chronicled the adventures of the Seven Dwarfs before they met Snow White. The planned series faced creative differences and was eventually scrapped. The concept was revived into a television series titled The 7D, which aired on Disney XD from 2014 to 2016.
Pinocchio	Pinocchio II	The canceled direct-to-video sequel to the original 1940 film. According to Robert Reece, the project's screenwriter, Pinocchio would have gone on a quest to find out why life is so unfair sometimes.
Disney Princess	Disney Princess Enchanted Tales	Initially, after the release of the direct-to-video film Disney Princess Enchanted Tales: Follow Your Dreams, there was to be an entire series of Enchanted Tales direct-to-video film installments.

=== 2008 ===
Series	Title	Description
(n/a)	Carmen Got Expelled!	In 2008, El Tigre creator Jorge R. Gutierrez stated he had pitched to Disney Television Animation an animated television series titled Carmen Got Expelled. The series was to revolve around Carmen, a rebellious young girl who has been expelled from every school. Enrolled in a private academy by the Baron, she faces challenges to avoid expulsion and has to navigate a new environment with unique rules. A pilot episode with a colored animatic has since been uploaded. According to Gutierrez, the DTA executives loved the pitch, but were uncomfortable with a Hispanic female lead. Instead, Gutierrez stated they wanted "her to be a white girl who follows the rules." Guiterrez also claimed they were told the series would be too "edgy" for Disney Channel. Nevertheless, he was thankful the series was not picked up as he later directed The Book of Life.

== 2010s ==
=== 2010 ===
Series	Title	Description
Feature film	Newt	In 2008, Disney announced an original film from Pixar, which would have concerned the exploits of two blue-footed newts, one male and one female, who cannot stand each other. They embark on an adventure and emotionally bond with each other to prevent the extinction of their species. Gary Rydstrom was the director, and it was intended to be released in 2011. However, in 2011, John Lasseter stated Newt had been shelved and asserted it shared similarities with Blue Sky Studios' Rio. In a March 2014 article, Pixar president Edwin Catmull stated that Newt was an idea that was not working in pre-production. When the project was passed to Pete Docter, he pitched an idea that Pixar thought was better, and that concept became Inside Out.
Feature film	ShadeMaker	In 2010, Henry Selick formed a joint venture with Pixar called Cinderbiter Productions, which was to exclusively produce stop-motion films. Its first project under the deal, a film titled ShadeMaker was set to be released on October 4, 2013, but was canceled in August 2012 due to creative differences. Selick was given the option to shop ShadeMaker (now titled The Shadow King) to other studios. Selick later stated in interviews that the film suffered from interference from John Lasseter who Selick claimed came in and constantly changed elements of the script and production that ended up ballooning the budget that would lead to its cancelation. However, in November 2022, Selick had reacquired the rights for The Shadow King from Disney and that he may revive the project.
Feature film	Calling All Robots	On March 26, 2008, Michael Dougherty was set to direct the animated sci-fi adventure film Calling All Robots with Zemeckis producing the film through ImageMovers Digital for Walt Disney Pictures.
Feature film	The Nutcracker	On November 26, 2009, Zemeckis had signed on to produce and direct the motion capture animated film adaptation of E.T.A. Hoffmann's The Nutcracker through ImageMovers Digital for Walt Disney Pictures. On July 21, 2016, Universal Pictures revived the adaptation, which may or may not use motion capture, with Zemeckis only set to produce the film and Evan Spiliotopoulos was hired to write the script. There has been no information since.
Feature film	Untitled Lee Unkrich Pixar film	Before Lee Unkrich directed Toy Story 3, he was developing an untitled film that "had similar elements with The Secret Life of Pets".
Disney Princess	Princess Academy	Princess Academy was to be an animated musical short that was developed by Olivier Ciappa and illustrator David Kawena, with music from Alan Menken. The short would have featured nearly all the female characters from Snow White and the Seven Dwarfs to Tangled, including those from the Pixar films, Jessica Rabbit from Who Framed Roger Rabbit, and Sally from The Nightmare Before Christmas. All the characters would have interacted with each other, singing, dancing and enjoying each other's company at a royal boarding school.

=== 2011 ===
Series	Title	Description
Feature film	Mort	This proposed traditionally animated film would have been based on Terry Pratchett's Discworld novel of the same name. It would have been directed by John Musker and Ron Clements, the directors of the 2009 film The Princess and the Frog. Disney could not afford the rights to the film so it was scrapped. Clements and Musker moved on to direct Moana.
Special	Untitled Phineas and Ferb/Kick Buttowski crossover	When Kick Buttowski: Suburban Daredevil was in the middle of its first season, a crossover of the show with Phineas and Ferb was in the talks. The special would have Phineas and Ferb making Kick a new stunt course while Brad and Candace team up to get them busted with Brad having a crush on her and Gunther would be teaming up with Perry to stop Doofenshmirtz from taking over the world by using stuntmen as his henchmen. However, the idea was scrapped for unknown reasons and the original information about it can be shown on Tumblr.
Mickey Mouse	Untitled Mickey Mouse film	In 2011, veteran Disney storyboard artist Burny Mattinson revealed in one interview that he was developing a "Mickey, Donald, Goofy feature film idea". In February 2023, Mattinson died at the age of 87.
Phineas and Ferb	Untitled Phineas and Ferb theatrical film	In January 2011, Gary Marsh, the president of Disney Channels Worldwide announced that early development on a theatrical feature film adaptation of Phineas and Ferb had commenced. Sean Bailey, head of production at Walt Disney Pictures, led the development, which would combine live-action and animation. By July, Povenmire and Marsh were in the early stages of writing the film's script; Michael Arndt, the writer of Little Miss Sunshine and Toy Story 3, was hired to write a further draft of the screenplay. The film was to be produced by Mandeville Films, and was originally scheduled for release on July 26, 2013. In October 2012, Disney moved the release date to 2014, and in August 2013, the film was removed from its schedule. In 2019, a new movie "Phineas and Ferb the Movie: Candace Against the Universe" was announced for then upcoming Disney+ streaming service slated for a 2020 release. In January 2026, it was announced that a third Phineas and Ferb film for Disney Channel and Disney+ entered in production.
Feature film	Yellow Submarine	This motion capture remake of the 1968 Beatles film was developed by Robert Zemeckis. Disney canceled the project due to the box office failure of the Zemeckis-produced motion capture film Mars Needs Moms and aesthetic concerns about the technology. After its cancellation at Disney, Zemeckis then tried to pitch the film to other studios, before eventually losing interest in the project.

=== 2012 ===
Series	Title	Description
Feature film	King of the Elves	Based on the short story by Philip K. Dick, it was originally directed by Aaron Blaise and Robert Walker, and scheduled for a Christmas 2012 release. However, the project was cancelled in December 2009, though it returned development in 2011 with Chris Williams as the director. Ultimately, Williams left the project in 2012 to work on Big Hero 6.
Feature film	The Graveyard Book	In April 2012, Walt Disney Pictures acquired the rights and hired Henry Selick, director of The Nightmare Before Christmas and the film adaptation of Gaiman's novel Coraline, to direct The Graveyard Book. The film was moved to Pixar as a stop-motion production, which would have been the company's first adapted work. After the studio and Selick parted ways over scheduling and development, it was announced in January 2013 that Ron Howard would direct the film. In July 2022, it was announced that Marc Forster would be directing a live-action feature film adaptation with Renée Wolfe, Gil Netter and Ben Brown set to produce, and David Magee writing the script. Later that year, Neil Gaiman stated that he has no involvement with the film.

=== 2013 ===
Series	Title	Description
Feature film	Untitled Mark Andrews Pixar film	In 2013, Brave co-director Mark Andrews stated he was developing an original feature film at Pixar. Andrews later left Pixar in 2018 when it was understood Pixar no longer wanted to make the film, which he described as a "big action-adventure fantasy epic".
Toy Story	Toy Story Toons: Mythic Rock	In 2013, it was revealed a fourth short of Toy Story Toons was in the works, entitled Mythic Rock. However, it was never released.
Cars	Cars Toons: Tales from Radiator Springs: To Protect and Serve	At the 2013 Disney D23 Expo, it was announced that a fifth episode of Cars Toons: Tales from Radiator Springs, entitled To Protect and Serve, was in production. However, it was never released.
Prep & Landing	Prep & Landing 4	In a 2011 interview promoting the third entry in the series of Christmas specials, Naughty vs. Nice, creators Kevin Deters and Stevie Wermers-Skelton stated that there were plans for a fourth entry in the series, but that they could not reveal any more about the project. The project ultimately never made it to broadcast, and the two were instead assigned to a different Christmas short, Olaf's Frozen Adventure, in 2016; by this point, the two spoke of the series in the past tense. In June 2024, it was announced that the franchise was revived at Disney Television Animation with a new special called Prep & Landing: The Snowball Protocol which had a November 2025 premiere on Disney Channel and Disney+. Following its release Disney Television Animation CEO Meredith Roberts expressed interest on the studio becoming the new home for the series with multiple specials.

=== 2014 ===
Series	Title	Description
Tinker Bell	Tinker Bell: Tinker Academy	In addition to the six feature-length Tinker Bell films, DisneyToon Studios also had plans for a seventh film. In April 2014, The Hollywood Reporter stated that the film was cancelled due to storyline problems. The story would have centered around Tinker Bell going to the titular school and meeting a new group of fairies called City Tinkers, with the most prominent one being a fairy named Ember.
Tinker Bell	Tink Meets Peter	Stephen Anderson stated on Twitter he had worked on an eighth Tinker Bell film with Dan Abraham in late 2014. The working title was Tink Meets Peter and was intended to be the final installment in the franchise and a direct prequel to the 1953 Peter Pan film. The story would have told how Peter arrived in Neverland and met Tinkerbell.
The Haunted Mansion	The Haunted Mansion	In July 2014, it was announced that Disney Television Animation was developing an animated special based on the attraction, the project originally was going to be helm by Phineas and Ferb writers Joshua Prett and Scott D. Peterson with Gris Grimly as art director and executive producer, the project was later re-developed as a potential mini-series for Disney XD with Shannon Tindle as executive producer but executive changes at Disney Channels Worldwide in 2017 shelved the production.
Winnie the Pooh	The World According To Winnie the Pooh	A collaboration between Cartoon Saloon and Disney Television Animation, the series was to be a modern reimagining of the Winnie the Pooh franchise. However, it was turned down by Disney. Since then, a clip of the pilot can has been uploaded to Twitter/X.

=== 2016 ===
Series	Title	
Series	Untitled Variety Show	In 2016, Uncle Grandpa alumni Audie Harrison developed an untitled variety series featuring short segments starring Chip and Dale, Cheshire Cat, Lilo & Stitch, and Tigger.

=== 2017 ===
Series	Title	Description
Feature film	Gigantic	Based on the English folk tale "Jack and the Beanstalk", the story was set in Spain, in which Jack befriends an 11-year-old female giant named Inma. Originally titled Giants, the film would have been directed by Nathan Greno and Meg LeFauve, co-written by LeFauve, produced by Dorothy McKim, executive-produced by John Lasseter, and included songs written by Robert Lopez and Kristen Anderson-Lopez. However, the project faced multiple delays, having been scheduled for release on March 9, 2018, November 21, 2018, and November 25, 2020. On October 10, 2017, Walt Disney Animation Studios President Ed Catmull announced that the film's production was "ending active development for now", with Raya and the Last Dragon taking up its original release date. Prior to the film being shelved, it was marketed in a scene in Disney's 2016 film Zootopia. Six years later, in 2023, a different Jack and the Beanstalk project was revealed to be in development at Skydance Animation, with Lasseter as producer and Disney alumnus Rich Moore as director.

=== 2018 ===
Series	Title	Description
Cars	Untitled Disney Space Movie	In July 2017 at the D23 Expo, John Lasseter announced that a spin-off film in the Planes series would explore the future of aviation in outer space. The film would have been released on April 12, 2019. On March 1, 2018, it was removed from the release schedule. On June 28, 2018, DisneyToon Studios was shut down, which ended development on the film.
Cars	Metro	Another spin-off after Planes set in the Cars universe about trains. Steve Loter incorporated some elements from Metro into the animated series Moon Girl and Devil Dinosaur.
Journey into Imagination with Figment	Untitled "Journey into Imagination" series	In August 2026, The Loud House and Sing 2 alumni Jordan Koch uploaded concept art of a proposed Journey into Imagination with Figment series that was pitched to Disney Television Animation and Walt Disney Imagineering around 2018, the project would end up being shelved for unknown reasons. In September 2022, it was announced that Walt Disney Pictures, Seth Rogen and Evan Goldberg through their Point Grey Pictures banner were developing a live-action/animated hybrid film starring Figment with Dan Hernandez and Benji Samit writing the screenplay. In September 2026, Seth Rogen confirmed that the Figment movie was still in active development at Disney. In March 2025, former The Walt Disney Company CEO Bob Iger stated that they were looking for ways to re-introduce the character by asking creative teams at Disney to develop short-form content with him or a long-form series, the following year newly appointed CEO Josh D'Amaro stated that development in new content starring the character was still in the works.
Adventures of the Gummi Bears	Untitled Adventures of the Gummi Bears reboot	In May 2026, Young Love and Carmen Sandiego alumni Brayden Kowalczuk uploaded concept art for a proposed Adventures of the Gummi Bears reboot that was pitched to Disney Television Animation in 2018 with the caption "Some work from the graveyard". In July 2024, Brazilian animator Pedro Eboli revealed at his X account that he and Mark Satterthwaite attempted to pitch a Adventures of the Gummi Bears reboot however Disney TVA opted to give the duo a overall development deal for the creation of original series.

=== 2019 ===
Series	Title	Description
Goof Troop	Untitled Goof Troop reboot	In 2019, Steven Universe Future and Star vs. the Forces of Evil alumni Becky Dreistadt and Frank Dreistadt attempted to pitch a Goof Troop reboot at Disney Television Animation. The series would have combined elements from Goof Troop, A Goofy Movie and An Extremely Goofy Movie. The project was scrapped for unknown reasons.
Doug	Doug Kids	In 2019, Doug creator Jim Jinkins was approached by an executive to pitch a sequel series titled Doug Kids focusing on Doug and Patti Mayonnaise's children. The series was reported to be in production at Disney Television Animation in fall 2023. Jinkins clarified that the series was scrapped due to the leadership changes at Disney Kids & Family, with Ayo Davis appointed as the new CEO.

== 2020s ==
=== 2020 ===
Series	Title	Description
The Princess and the Frog	Tiana	In December 2020, Disney announced they were developing a streaming television series titled Tiana. Set after the events of the film, the series was to center on Tiana's new role as princess of Maldonia and exploring her home city, New Orleans. The series was to be released in 2022. The release date was postponed to 2023 and eventually 2024. In March 2023, the show's page was changed to "coming soon to Disney+" with no mention of a release window. In March 2025, it was announced that the series had been shelved due to its high production costs and the studio was moving away from longform streaming content. Disney however confirmed a television special based on the film would be produced instead.
Gargoyles	Untitled Gargoyles reboot	In 2020, Super Robot Monkey Team Hyperforce Go! creator Ciro Nieli pitched a Gargoyles reboot to Disney Television Animation. The new series would have been a sequel to the original with the premise of "Canmore casting a spell where it sets the Manhattan Clan back in to deep sleep while he takes over the 5 Burroughs of NYC with crime lords and monster beasts. 25 years later Elisa Maza raises the Gargoyles back from their spell and the fight to take back the city begins". The project would get scrapped due to cuts that affected The Walt Disney Company during the COVID-19 pandemic. In October 2023, it was announced that Disney Television Studios and Atomic Monster where developing a live-action Gargoyles series for Disney+ with Gary Dauberman as showrunner and James Wan and Michael Clear as executive producers. Dauberman would mention that the project was still alive in April 2025. In August 2026, series creator Greg Weisman confirmed that the live-action series won't move forward at Disney+. The same month, Brent Spiner which voiced Puck in the original series hinted at his podcast 'Dropping Names with Brent and Jonny' that a brand new animated series was in development at Disney Television Animation and Disney Kids & Family. In November 2026, Seth Rogen expressed interest in reviving the series trought Point Grey Pictures.

=== 2021 ===
Series	Title	Description
Oswald the Lucky Rabbit	Untitled Oswald the Lucky Rabbit series	A series centered on Oswald was in development, with the project announced in 2019 for a potential release on Disney+. Disney Television Animation veteran Matt Danner revealed that a series was in development as a follow up for the team behind Legend of the Three Caballeros, but that they "got broken up and scattered to the wind". He expressed hope that the series could still be revived in the future and further hinted that another team would develop it, as Disney was still heavily invested in wanting to revive the character. In March 2025, it was reported that Jon Favreau was developing a live-action animated hybrid series based on the character for Disney+. Concept art for the scrapped series would get discovered in May 2025.

=== 2022 ===
Series	Title	Description
The Rescuers; The Great Mouse Detective	The Rescue Aid Society	In 2022, Rapunzel's Tangled Adventure, Monsters At Work and Wish alumni Tom Caulfield revealed that he alongside The Ghost and Molly McGee creators Bill Motz and Bob Roth pitched a crossover series featuring The Rescuers and The Great Mouse Detective at Disney Television Animation. The series would have featured the descendant of Basil working at a modern version of The Rescue Aid Society more akin to The Kingsman or Mission: Impossible led by Bianca. According to Caulfield the project was scrapped due to the release of the Chip 'n Dale: Rescue Rangers film.
Recess	Recess: Next Bell	In September 2022, Paul Germain and Joe Ansolabehere revealed on a interview with SlashFilm that they where working on a revival series of Recess at Disney Television Animation stating that "We've come up with several different angles and we've tried different things. It's been four years that we've been working on it, but that's an example of how things have changed... things are slower." An early bible for the sequel series was leaked in June 2024 detailing that the project would take place 20 years after the events of the original sequel series following Spinelli and Vince's daughter Ruby and her gang at the Third Street Elementary School now run by Randall. In January 2026, Germain and Ansolabehere confirmed that the project got scrapped by Disney due "political reasons".

=== 2023 ===
Series	Title	Description
Win or Lose	Untitled Win or Lose follow-up series/Ghost Market	Pixar was working on an untitled follow-up series, but it was quietly cancelled. In August 2025, TheWrap reported that the series might be reworked as a feature film. The production team ended up moving to direct the feature film Ghost Market, which is set for March 10, 2028.
Kim Possible	Untitled Kim Possible reboot	In January 2023, it was speculated that a Kim Possible continuation series was in development at Disney Television Animation. In May 2026, Bob Schooley indicated on his Bluesky account that the project had been scrapped, stating, "It's a long, painful story". Christy Carlson Romano, the voice of Kim Possible, called out a Disney Kids & Family executive who said a reboot of the series was irrelevant during Disney Channel Nite at Disneyland in April 2026.
Feature film	BeFri	In 2023, Pixar's leadership screened an in-progress film titled BeFri, short for "best friends", to Bob Iger and other Disney executives. Intended to be directed by story artist Kristen Lester, the story was focused on two teenage girls who were once best friends but find themselves drifting apart after learning that their favorite, Sailor Moon–style TV show was real. The girls then set out on a universe-spanning quest to save humanity. In April 2026, several anonymous former Pixar employees told The Hollywood Reporter the film was scrapped by Disney executives rather than Pixar themselves feeling that the movie "didn't feel like little boys could see themselves in the film enough".
The Proud Family: Louder and Prouder	La Familia Avenúñez	In December 2023, Disney Enterprises Inc. registered a new project under the title La Familia Avenúñez which was set to be a spin-off of The Proud Family: Louder and Prouder. The spin-off was set to focus on LaBrea Avenúñez and her mother Melrose Avenúñez dealing with their extended Latin American family. In August 2026 series writer Ashley Soto Paniagua confirmed at her Instagram account that the project was shelved.

== See also ==
- List of unproduced 20th Century Studios animated projects
- List of unproduced Marvel Comics projects
  - List of unproduced television projects based on Marvel Comics
  - List of unproduced films based on Marvel Imprints
- List of unproduced Universal Pictures animated projects
- List of unproduced DreamWorks Animation projects
- List of unproduced Paramount Pictures animated projects

== Bibliography ==
- Solomon, Charles (1995). The Disney That Never Was. New York: Disney Editions. ISBN 978-0-786-86037-1.
