= Searching for a Successor =

- Story code: W WDC 187-01
- Story: Carl Barks
- Ink: Carl Barks
- Date: April 28, 1955
- Hero: Donald Duck
- Pages: 10
- Layout: 4 rows per page
- Appearances: Donald Duck; Scrooge McDuck; Huey, Dewey and Louie; Gladstone Gander
- First publication: April 1956

"Searching for a Successor" is a Disney comics story by Carl Barks about the rivalry between Donald Duck and Gladstone Gander.

== Plot ==
A top hat is rolling down the street and both Donald and Gladstone try to catch it. They both hit the wall and discovers that the hat belongs to Scrooge McDuck. Scrooge gets his hat back and reveals that it's time for him to choose a successor. As a test of who is most fit for the role he decides to give Donald and Gladstone a business each to run.

Next day Donald goes to meet Uncle Scrooge, but Gladstone is too lazy to show up. Donald gets the first choice of business between a house moving company and a feather bed factory, the manager of the house moving company will have to move a house from a steep hill to another just as difficult spot, so Donald thinks the feather bed factory is the easiest way to go to become the winner of the test. Gladstone ends up with the house moving company.

Donald and his nephews have a very hard time selling any mattresses so they shift the production to make feather pillows instead. A sudden tornado appears and luckily for Glandstone it moves the house he is needing to relocate to the new designated spot, while it also scatters Donald's feathers all over town. Fortunately, Scrooge gives Donald a big commission because the McDuck businesses sold two warehouses of vacuum cleaners, thanks to all feathers Donald's factory lost to the tornado.

== See also ==
- List of Disney comics by Carl Barks
