= Gigantic (unproduced film) =

Cancelled animated Disney film

- Directed by: Nathan Greno; Meg LeFauve
- Screenplay by: Meg LeFauve; Allison Moore
- Story by: Shane Morris; Meg LeFauve; Jennifer Lee
- Based on: Jack and the Beanstalk by Benjamin Tabart
- Produced by: Dorothy McKim
- Cinematography: Rob Dressel (layout) Adolph Lusinsky (lighting)
- Edited by: Jeff Draheim; Tim Mertens
- Music by: David Newman (score); Robert Lopez (songs); Kristen Anderson-Lopez (songs)
- Production company: Walt Disney Animation Studios
- Country: United States
- Language: English

Gigantic is an unproduced American animated musical fantasy film based on the English fairy tale "Jack and the Beanstalk". The film was to be directed by Nathan Greno and Meg LeFauve, produced by Dorothy McKim, and was to feature original songs from Robert Lopez and Kristen Anderson-Lopez.

Gigantic was initially scheduled to be released on November 21, 2018, but it was pushed back to November 25, 2020 after it was announced that Ralph Breaks the Internet would be released on the former date. It was also intended to be the first Walt Disney Animation Studios adaptation film since Big Hero 6. However, on October 10, 2017, Disney cancelled the movie due to creative differences. Raya and the Last Dragon then assumed the November 2020 date even though its release was delayed to March 5, 2021 due to the COVID-19 pandemic.

== Premise ==
Set in Spain during the Age of Exploration, the film followed Jack as he discovers a world of giants hidden within clouds. Jack befriends the giantess Inma, who's "11 years old, 60 feet tall, fiery, feisty, and a lot to control" and estimated to be over 90 tons or over 180,000 pounds! She treats him like a living doll. Meanwhile, the antagonists, Storm Giants, stand at 120 feet.

== Production ==
During the D23 Expo in August 2015, Disney announced the film Gigantic, which would be produced by Dorothy McKim, and the film's music would be written by Robert Lopez and Kristen Anderson-Lopez (Winnie the Pooh, Frozen). Director Nathan Greno stated "we're looking to make the definitive version of Jack and the Beanstalk," which he also mentioned did not really have one. The film would be different from the original tale. On October 3, 2016, it was announced that Oscar-nominated screenwriter Meg LeFauve (Inside Out) would join Greno as director.

=== Cancellation and aftermath ===
On October 10, 2017, Walt Disney Animation Studios President Ed Catmull announced that the film's production was "ending active development for now", with another project, later revealed to be Raya and the Last Dragon, taking up its original release date. Discussing the film being shelved, Catmull stated: "It's impossible to know when we begin a project how the creative process will unfold, and sometimes, no matter how much we love an idea or how much heart goes into it, we find that it just isn't working. With Gigantic, we've come to that point, and although it's a difficult decision, we are ending active development for now." A month later, The Wall Street Journal reported that Disney had written-off nearly $98 million in the film's production costs.

Prior to the film's cancellation, it was marketed in a scene in Disney's 2016 film Zootopia. In the scene, the film is referenced as Giraffic. Other then-upcoming films referenced in the scene include Moana, referred to as "Meowana", and Frozen 2, referred to as "Floatzen 2".

In 2020, Disney officially released the project's concept artwork in the book They Drew as They Pleased: Volume 6—The Hidden Art of Disney's Golden Age.

In 2023, a different Jack and the Beanstalk project was revealed to be in development at Skydance Animation, with Lasseter returning as producer, but with Disney alum Rich Moore now directing.

== Release ==
When announced in 2015, Gigantic was scheduled to be released on March 9, 2018. However, on June 30, 2016, Disney announced that Ralph Breaks the Internet would instead be released on that date, and Gigantic was pushed back to November 21, 2018. In April 2017, Ralph Breaks the Internet took the November 2018 release date, and the release date of Gigantic was pushed back to November 25, 2020.

== See also ==
- My Peoples
- List of unproduced Disney animated projects
- List of Disney animated films based on fairy tales
