= A Financial Fable =

1951 Donald Duck comic book story by Carl Barks

- Walt Disney's Comics and Stories #126 (March 1951)
- Story code: W WDC 126-02
- Story: Carl Barks
- Ink: Carl Barks
- Date: September 14, 1950
- Hero: Donald Duck
- Pages: 10
- Layout: 4 rows per page
- Appearances: Donald Duck; Scrooge McDuck; Gladstone Gander; Huey, Dewey and Louie
- First publication: Walt Disney's Comics and Stories #126; March 1951

"A Financial Fable" is a Donald Duck comic book story written and illustrated by Carl Barks in September 1950. As with many other Barks stories, it was originally untitled. The story deals with what will happen if everyone in a community becomes a millionaire.

In the story, Scrooge McDuck is running a farm and keeps all his money in a corn crib at the farm. A cyclone hits the crib, and spreads the cash all over an agricultural area. Many people immediately quit their jobs in hopes of financing travels. Scrooge maintains control over the only functioning farm in the area and gains a monopoly over the area's food supply. He charges millions for small quantities of eggs, ham, cabbages, and corn (maize), and all the new millionaires are forced to pay him in order to eat. Scrooge soon gets all of his money back, having profited from his monopoly.

The story emphasizes that Scrooge believes in hard work as a virtue, working in his own farm along with his farmworkers. He is depicted as an emblem of the Protestant work ethic instead of the exploitive capitalist depicted in his previous stories. On the other hand, the new millionaires represent consumerism. The story itself functions as a defense of the capitalistic system, and its right-wing political message had been described as indicating that Barks' socio-economic viewpoint "was somewhat to the right of Ayn Rand". A professor of economics has noted the similarities between this story and the 1960s theories of helicopter money by Milton Friedman.

== Publications ==
The story first appeared in Walt Disney's Comics and Stories #126 in March 1951. It has later appeared in Walt Disney's Comics and Stories #363 (December 1970) and #489 (August 1981), Uncle Scrooge Adventures #23 (November 1993), Uncle Scrooge #326 (February 2004), and other publications.

Outside of the United States, the story has been published in Australia, Belgium, Brazil, Bulgaria, Chile, China, Croatia, Czechia, Denmark, Egypt, Estonia, Faroe Islands, Finland, France, Germany, Greece, Hungary, Iceland, Indonesia, Italy, Latvia, Netherlands, Norway, Poland, Portugal, Romania, Russia, Serbia, Slovakia, Slovenia, Spain, Sweden, and Yugoslavia.

This story has been published 186 times in 34 countries.

== Plot ==
Scrooge McDuck is running a farm, employing his nephews as farmhands. While Huey, Dewey and Louie enjoy working, Donald Duck is tired of labour and quits the job, joining his lucky cousin Gladstone Gander in searching for luck and money.

Scrooge keeps all his money in a corn crib at the farm. When a cyclone hits the crib, the cash is spread all over the area. Scrooge is not upset, knowing that if he and his young nephews keep working, they will get the money back soon enough.

Meanwhile, Gladstone is demonstrating his unbelievable luck, holding out his hat and asking for some money to land in it. Two million of Scrooge's dollars then fall down from the sky and land in the hat. Meanwhile, the wind rains money on other farms, causing farmhands to exclaim "The heck with work, I am going to see the world"! The two cousins decide to spend the money on traveling, and drive to the local village to buy gas, while Huey, Dewey and Louie elect to stay on the farm out of moral obligation to care for the animals and tend crops. When they arrive, they learn that money has been distributed to the villagers as well, and the village has become a ghost town. They cannot get gas, buy a soda nor a bus ticket as the gas station, drugstore and bus depot all have signs akin to "Closed; Owner Gone to See the World".

Gladstone does not know what to do, while Donald suggests walking to a nearby community not hit by the money cyclone. However, he cannot buy a good pair of shoes as the shoe store is now abandoned as well. Donald gives up, and returns to his uncle, where he gets his job back, while Gladstone gives Donald his million and goes fishing. Scrooge informs him that if he wants to eat eggs for breakfast, they cost a million each.

Eventually, all the new millionaires go to Scrooge's farm to buy food and perhaps get a job. Due to Scrooge and the nephews being the only producers of food, the prices having drastically increased — an egg now costs one million dollars, as does a ham, a cabbage costs two million, and a peck of corn costs four million — Scrooge soon gets all of his money back, and everything is back to normal.

== Analysis ==
"A Financial Fable" changes the character of Scrooge into a proponent of hard work. Thomas Andrae writes, "No longer an old Shylock or exploitive capitalist, he is an emblem of the Protestant ethic. The owner of a farm, he works right alongside the ducks, who are his hired help. Donald, conversely, hates work and wishes for a million dollars for everyone so that they can live a life of leisure and fun rather than toil. These positions stake out contradictions in the tenets of the American dream and the way in which alienation in the workplace and a consumer ethos of immediate gratification were undermining the Protestant ethic, which demanded hard work, thrift, and the sacrifice of present pleasures for future gains."

The message of the story has been described as politically right-wing. Ed Natcher of Prism Comics wrote that Barks "wrote from a socio-economic viewpoint that was somewhat to the right of Ayn Rand" and that the story could make "any Bush blush with envy at its conservative credentials". Donaldist Jon Gisle called the story "a classic defence of the capitalistic system".

Gunnar Bårdsen, a Norwegian professor of economics, has pointed out the similarities between the story and Nobel Prize-winning economist Milton Friedman's 1969 theories of "helicopter money".

Barks himself called "A Financial Fable" a "story of easy riches" and said that the message of the story surely would get him "in a cell in a Siberian gulag someday."

== See also ==
- List of Disney comics by Carl Barks
