= Race to the South Seas! =

- Story code: W MOC 41-01
- Story: Carl Barks
- Ink: Carl Barks
- Date: 1949
- Pages: 22
- Layout: 4 rows per page
- Appearances: Donald Duck; Huey, Dewey and Louie; Gladstone Gander; Uncle Scrooge
- First publication: March of Comics #41

"Race to the South Seas!" is a 22-page Disney comics story written, drawn, and lettered by Carl Barks. Characters in the story include Donald Duck, his nephews Huey, Dewey, and Louie, Gladstone Gander, and Uncle Scrooge. The story was first published in March of Comics #41 (1949), and has been reprinted several times. Race is one of Barks's first stories to present Gladstone's good luck to be something almost supernatural.

== Plot ==
Uncle Scrooge has been lost at sea, but is believed to be alive on some remote Pacific island. Donald and Gladstone each set sail to be the first to rescue their favorite uncle. Gladstone has all the luck and smooth sailing while Donald and the nephews have rough going. Scrooge is finally found on an island where he has the natives worshiping and waiting on him like an idol and king. He is running his business from the island because he doesn't want his relatives interfering. When Gladstone appears, Scrooge removes him from his will. He promises to leave his fortune to Donald because he has kept his distance. Donald sails home the winner.
