= My Peoples =

Cancelled animated Disney film

- Directed by: Barry Cook
- Written by: Ian Southwood
- Produced by: Kendra Haaland
- Starring: Dolly Parton; Charles Durning; Travis Tritt; Ashley Judd
- Music by: Mark O'Connor
- Production company: Walt Disney Feature Animation
- Country: United States

My Peoples (also known as Once in a Blue Moon, Elgin's Peoples, Angel and Her No Good Sister and A Few Good Ghosts) is a cancelled animated musical fantasy film that was to be directed by Barry Cook, the co-director of Mulan (1998). It was scrapped in favor of Chicken Little (2005).

== Premise ==
Set in Appalachia in the 1940s, My Peoples was to tell the story (similar to Romeo and Juliet) of two feuding families: the Harpers and the McGees (modeled after the Hatfields and McCoys), whose two children, Elgin and Rose, fall in love. Elgin Harper creates dolls from various household objects, and ships one doll named Angel to woo Rose McGee. However, a magic potion from Rose's father, Old Man McGee, backfires and brings the dolls to life. Angel abandons her mission and proceeds to leave town, at which the other dolls pursue her so she can unite the families.

== Cast ==
- Dolly Parton as Angel, a heaven-themed doll made from a flour scoop that Elgin created as a proposal gift for Rose.
- Charles Durning as Old Man McGee
- Mike Snider as Good O'Boy, a hillbilly-type doll made from car parts
- Travis Tritt as Elgin Harper
- Ashley Judd as Rose McGee
- Lou Rawls as Blues Man
- Lily Tomlin as Miss Spinster, an old lady doll made from the wooden leg of Elgin's dear, departed aunt.
- Hal Holbrook as Abe, an Abraham Lincoln doll made from a scrub-brush who had spoons for ears.
- Jean Smart as Arvilla Tugthistle, the McGees' neighbor.
- Diedrich Bader as Herbert Hollingshed
- James Carville as Crazy Ray, a convict-themed doll made from a tree stump that lived under Elgin's porch.
- Billy Connolly as Angel's Dog, Angel's canine companion, made from a spool and clothespin.

== Development ==
Five months after directing Mulan (1998), Barry Cook began developing a pitch for an animated film based on a short story he had previously written titled The Ghost & the Gift, which involved three children and a ghost helping an Appalachian couple get together. In 2000, Cook pitched his idea to Michael Eisner and Thomas Schumacher, both of whom agreed the idea showed potential but were reluctant. Eisner demurred about the project's simplicity while Schumacher felt the project was "too human" and more appropriate for a live action film. Looking back over the research, Cook remembered how many of the residents there dabbled in the creation of household-item induced dolls. He then retooled his idea and added seven folk art characters into the story. For the next pitch meeting, he created a maquette of the character Angel which he hoped to use as a visual aid. However, because he was located at the Feature Animation Florida studio, Cook could not physically attend the meeting.

Not to be deterred, Cook shipped a maquette in a wooden violin case to Burbank, California, at which point he phoned up an assistant, instructing him to place it on the conference room table at the meeting. When the meeting came, Cook re-pitched his idea to Schumacher over the phone and told him to open the case. Charmed by the idea, Schumacher green-lit the project into active development. The story was then revised into being about mischievous mountain spirits inhabiting the folk art dolls. By May 2003, the film was re-titled again to Elgin's People. In June, during a meeting about the studio's future animation slate, Pam Coats told Eisner the project had been re-titled to Angel and Her No Good Sister. David Stainton believed the new title suggested "automatic conflict". In October 2003, the project was re-titled once more to A Few Good Ghosts. One month later, Eisner viewed a rough cut screening of the film's first act. To the crew's surprise, Eisner reportedly praised the film exclaiming, "You folks finally have a movie here!"

However, on November 14, Stainton announced in a company email that production on A Few Good Ghosts had been cancelled. Cook believed the project was cancelled because Chicken Little (2005) was more marketable for a release. The project's cancellation and the subsequent closure of the Florida studio led to nearly 260 artists losing their jobs.

== Legacy ==
The characters for the film were used in Disney's 2007 animated film Meet the Robinsons as part of the failed inventions of Cornelius Robinson.

== See also ==
- Gigantic (unproduced film)
- List of unproduced Disney animated projects
