= Donald Duck Finds Pirate Gold =

1942 Donald Duck comic story

- Cover of Four Color #9 by an unknown artist, probably Hank Porter
- Story code: W OS 9-02
- Story: Homer Brightman (plot); Harry Reeves (plot); Bob Karp (script)
- Ink: Carl Barks; Jack Hannah
- Date: October 1942
- Hero: Donald Duck
- Pages: 64
- Layout: 3 rows per page
- Appearances: Donald Duck; Huey, Dewey and Louie; Black Pete; Yellow Beak; Red Eye and his brother
- First publication: Four Color #9

"Donald Duck Finds Pirate Gold" is a Disney comics story starring Donald Duck that was originally printed in Four Color #9 (the first Four Color issue titled "Donald Duck") in October 1942. The script was by Bob Karp and illustrated by Carl Barks and Jack Hannah. The story is significant for launching the first American Donald Duck adventure comic series, and for being Barks' first duck comics work.

The storyline was originally developed for a Mickey Mouse feature cartoon (under the title "Morgan's Ghost") in which Mickey Mouse, Donald, and Goofy meet Yellow Beak and encounter Pete, but the cartoon was never produced.

== Plot ==
In this story, Donald and his three nephews meet a parrot named Yellow Beak and they wind up searching for the lost treasure of Henry Morgan. Unfortunately for them, Black Pete wants the treasure too.

== Production ==
Disney historian Jim Korkis reports the notion of taking the unmade feature and adapting the storyline for publication as a comic book occurred when Dell Comics editor Oskar Lebeck "was given permission to look through the Disney files of cartoon ideas that were shelved. He found the over 800 numbered sketches for "Morgan's Ghost" and was instantly struck that most of the work had already been done in terms of visualizing the story. Lebeck felt it could easily be adapted into a Donald Duck comic book story."

Bob Karp, who wrote the script, was a gag writer for the Donald Duck newspaper comic strip.

Hannah recalled John Clarke Rose, Story Research Director at the Disney Studio, "took us to meet Eleanor Packer who I believe was in charge of Whitman/Western Publishing. They wanted us to draw 64 pages of a Donald Duck story. I suspect the reason we were chosen for this assignment was that it was a more story related project. We were doing all the Donald Duck stories for the shorts and doing all the story sketches at the time so I'm just guessing that they probably felt we could work out this story as well, maybe even add in a few touches to help it flow properly."

In 1993, Barks recalled, "Jack and I looked the script over and decided which pages we would like to draw. After we had drawn a few pages, we decided that I should draw all of the stuff that was involved with the ducks outside on the deck of the boat or on the island, and Jack would take care of the inside stuff." The two artists inked their own work.

Almost half of the story's pages have no words, relying instead on the visual style preferred for animation. "That's why there's so little dialogue in Pirate Gold," Barks said in 1983. "Bob took it from the storyboards. In animation they wanted things moving on the screen: they didn't want characters in held positions moving their lips."

Before this story, the first Donald Duck adventure comics had so far only appeared in Italy, in the 1937–1940 Italian Disney comics magazine Donald Duck and Other Adventures (Paperino e altre avventure) by Federico Pedrocchi.

== Sequels ==
Two sequels to this story were published.

"Donald Duck and the Pirates" (Cheerios Giveaway #W1, 1947) by Chase Craig and Jack Hannah, has Yellow Beak accompany Donald and his nephews to an island to find buried treasure. This story was reprinted in the US in Donald Duck #365 (2011).

In "Donald Duck Finds Pirate Gold... Again!" (originally titled "Bacicin riprende il mare" in Almanacco Topolino #71, Nov 1962), by Abramo Barosso, Giampaolo Barosso, and Giovan Battista Carpi, Bacicin Parodi (Yellow Beak) comes out of retirement to tempt Donald, his nephews and Uncle Scrooge on another treasure hunt, followed by the Beagle Boys. This story was reprinted in the US in Donald Duck #366 (2011).

Yellow Beak also appeared in two more Disney comics stories:

- "The Seven Dwarfs and the Pirate" in Four Color #229 (May 1949), by Tony Strobl
- "Captain Hook and the Buried Treasure" in Peter Pan Treasure Chest #1 (Jan. 1953), by Del Connell and Dick Moores

== Legacy ==
The story's plot and storyboard-based style may have influenced Osamu Tezuka's influential manga Shin Takarajima.

== See also ==
- List of Disney comics by Carl Barks
- Donald Duck in comics
