= Morgan's Ghost =

Unreleased Disney film

"Morgan's Ghost" (also called "Three Buccaneers" and "Pieces of Eight" in production) is an unreleased cartoon film by Walt Disney Productions, dated around 1939. A Disney comics adaptation, Donald Duck Finds Pirate Gold, was published in Dell Comics' Four Color #9 in 1942.

It would also have been the first film which had Mickey Mouse's new eyes, which would first appear in The Pointer (1939).

== Plot ==
Mickey Mouse, Donald Duck, and Goofy are the owners of a small tavern in a New England village called Fish Haven. On a stormy night, they are visited by a parrot with a peg leg named Yellow Beak. He is hiding from Black Pete because Yellow Beak has the treasure map of the pirate Henry Morgan. Yellow Beak offers to share the treasure, if the trio can obtain a ship to get him to the island where the treasure is buried.

Pete overhears all of this discussion and disguises himself as an old woman, who persuades the treasure hunters to lease his ship, the Sea Skunk. After a series of slapstick interludes at sea, Pete captures Yellow Beak and the map. He sets Mickey, Donald, and Goofy adrift in a tiny raft. They wash ashore on a tropical island, the very one with the treasure. They find an old chest that contains not gold but the nutty ghosts of Henry Morgan and two of his crew. They have been trapped in the chest for a century and so they celebrate being released. They agree to help the trio rescue Yellow Beak and find the long lost treasure. The ghost of Captain Morgan can't tell the trio directly where the treasure is hidden because "Dead men tell no tales".

The trio and the ghosts rescue Yellow Beak and the map. A gap in the map has to be placed over the tattoo on Yellow Beak's chest to reveal the treasure's true hiding place. After battling man-eating plants, quicksand, and geysers, they find the gold.

There were two possible endings. One had Pete trying to take the loot but losing a game of "Who's Got the Drop on Whom?" with the good guys getting the treasure. An alternate version has Pete taking the treasure and the down hearted treasure hunters returning to their tavern. Their gloom is lifted when Donald bursts in with a newspaper and the headline that Pete has been arrested for passing counterfeit treasure. Yellow Beak announces that he just remembered that what they found was a decoy treasure chest. The location of the real treasure is tattooed on his rear end. The story ends with them heading off to find the real treasure.

== Legacy ==
The story was later released as Donald Duck Finds Pirate Gold.

"Dead men tell no tales" became a phrase mostly associated with the Pirates of the Caribbean franchise. It would originate in the Disney attraction that opened at Disneyland in 1967 as the last attraction in which Walt Disney had any involvement in. The phrase would later be used throughout the series of films, specifically The Curse of the Black Pearl, At World's End, and Dead Men Tell No Tales being the title of the fifth film.

== See also ==
- List of unmade and unreleased Disney animated shorts and feature films
