= Luck of the North =

1949 Donald Duck comic book story

- Original cover art by Carl Barks
- Story code: W OS 256-02
- Story: Carl Barks
- Ink: Carl Barks
- Date: December 1949
- Hero: Donald Duck
- Pages: 32
- Layout: 4 rows per page
- Appearances: Huey, Dewey and Louie; Gladstone Gander
- First publication: Four Color #256

"Luck of the North" is a 32-page Disney comics adventure story written, drawn, and lettered by Carl Barks. It stars Donald Duck, Huey, Dewey and Louie, and Gladstone Gander. It was first published by Dell Publishing in Four Color #256 (December 1949) with three gag stories by Barks: "Toasty Toys", "No Place to Hide", and "Tied-Down Tools". The story, cover, and gags have all been reprinted many times.

The story follows Donald's attempt to get Gladstone lost in Alaska with a fake map of a uranium mine. Donald and the nephews finally rescue Gladstone. It is one of the handful of longer duck adventure stories by Barks to include Gladstone, who mostly appeared in the 10 pagers and holiday tales.

== See also ==
- List of Disney comics by Carl Barks
