= March of Comics =

March of Comics was a comic book series published by Western Publishing. 488 issues were published from 1946 to 1982.

== History ==
Comics historian Mark Evanier has described it as "...one of the most widely circulated comic books in the history of mankind ... some issues reportedly were issued in quantities of five million and up". The comic was not in standard comic format. All issues were smaller (in page count and eventually in size) than normal, and at one point they were printed in an oblong format. None were sold. The series was published as a "giveaway" premium and sold to vendors who would stamp their name on it (or arrange for their logo to be printed on the cover) and give it away to children who shopped at their store. A prominent outlet for the series was through the shoe departments at Sears stores. No publisher logo was on the cover. It was published under Western's "K.K. Publishing" subsidiary through the mid-1960s, then by just Western. Many of the characters published by Western for Dell Comics and their own Gold Key Comics, both licensed and original, appeared in the comic.

Characters published included Walt Disney characters, Warner Brothers characters, Walter Lantz Studio characters, Tarzan, Our Gang (with art by Walt Kelly), Little Lulu, and Western's own Turok and Space Family Robinson.

Issues of the March of Comics series are typically harder to find for collectors than other comics published in the same period, given their method of distribution, and as a giveaway, they are more likely to be thrown away by recipients (or their parents). The three most sought-after March of Comics issues are those featuring long Donald Duck stories by Carl Barks. These are no. 4 from 1947 (Maharajah Donald), no. 20 from 1948 (Darkest Africa), and no. 41 from 1949 (Race to the South Seas). This latter story is the very first where Gladstone Gander's extravagant good luck is revealed.

Comics historian Michael Barrier has posted on his website circulation figures supplied by Disney Archivist David R. Smith for some early issues of March of Comics, derived from royalty statements Western submitted to the Disney studios:

- Donald Duck March of Comics No. 20: 278,200
- Donald Duck March of Comics No. 56: 572,450
- Mickey Mouse March of Comics No. 27: 471,900
