= Wintertime Wager =

- "Winterime Wager" was first published in Walt Disney's Comics and Stories #88, January 1948
- Story code: W WDC 88-02
- Story: Carl Barks
- Ink: Carl Barks
- Date: January 1948
- Pages: 10
- Layout: 4 rows per page
- Appearances: Donald Duck; Huey, Dewey and Louie; Daisy Duck; Gladstone Gander (first appearance)
- First publication: Walt Disney's Comics and Stories #88

"Wintertime Wager" is a 10-page Disney comics story written, drawn, and lettered by Carl Barks. It was first published in Walt Disney's Comics and Stories #88 (January 1948). Characters in the story include Donald Duck, his nephews Huey, Dewey, and Louie, Daisy Duck, and Gladstone Gander. The story marks Gladstone Gander's first appearance. "Wintertime Wager" has been reprinted many times.

== Plot ==
It is Christmas Day. The snows are deep and the temperatures are very cold. Donald wants to stay indoors to keep warm. His cousin Gladstone Gander arrives to tell Donald he has lost their wager made the previous summer.

At that time, Donald had agreed that he would forfeit his house to his cousin should he fail to go swimming in Frozenbear Lake on Christmas Day. To keep his house, Donald now dons his swimming suit, but cannot bring himself to jump into the cold lake.

Daisy Duck arrives to remind Gladstone that he promised her last summer that he would drink two gallons of lemonade within an hour, or return the house to Donald. Gladstone fails to drink the lemonade; Donald gets his house back.

The nephews decide the moral of the story is: "A big bragging mouth always get one into trouble." As Daisy leaves, she hears Gladstone and Donald boyishly making wagers for next year. With a sigh, she leaves, realizing that Donald and Gladstone have not learned their lesson.

== See also ==
- List of Disney comics by Carl Barks
