= Gladstone Gander =

Disney comics character

- Donald Duck character
- Gladstone as drawn by Don Rosa
- First appearance: "Wintertime Wager" in Walt Disney's Comics and Stories #88 (January 1948)
- Created by: Carl Barks
- Voiced by: Will Ryan (Sport Goofy in Soccermania; deleted scenes); Rob Paulsen (DuckTales 1987 series); Corey Burton (Donald Duck: Goin' Quackers); Paul F. Tompkins (DuckTales 2017 series)

In-universe information
- Species: Half-Duck, Half-Goose
- Title: The Luckiest Person in the World
- Family: Gander family Duck family
- Significant others: Daisy Duck; Linda Paper; Feather Mallard
- Relatives: Goostave Gander (father); Daphne Duck (mother); Donald Duck (first cousin); Della Duck (first cousin); Gus Goose (second cousin); Scrooge McDuck (uncle's brother-in-law); Huey, Dewey, and Louie (first cousins once removed)

Gladstone Gander is a cartoon character created in 1948 by Carl Barks for Walt Disney's Comics and Stories. He is an anthropomorphic gander (male goose) who possesses exceptionally good luck that grants him anything he desires as well as protecting him from any harm. This is in contrast to his cousin Donald Duck, who is often characterized for having bad luck. Gladstone is also a rival of Donald for the affection of Daisy Duck. Gladstone dresses in a very debonair way, often in a suit, and wearing a bow-tie, fedora, and spats. He has a wavy hairstyle which is depicted either as white or blonde. In the story "Luck of the North" (December 1949), he is described as having a brassy voice.

== Origin ==
Gladstone Gander first appeared in "Wintertime Wager" in Walt Disney's Comics and Stories #88 (January 1948), written and drawn by Carl Barks. In that story he arrives at Donald Duck's house during a freezing cold Christmas Day to remind him of a wager Donald made the previous summer; that he could swim in the Frozenbear Lake during Christmas Day or forfeit his house to Gladstone. Donald eventually loses the wager but Gladstone later on loses a wager of his own, brought to light by Daisy Duck, and thus Donald's house is returned to him.

Barks gradually developed Gladstone's personality and demeanor after his first appearance and used him quite frequently—in 24 stories between 1948 and 1953, the first five years of his existence. In his first three appearances in 1948 ("Wintertime Wager", "Gladstone Returns", "Links Hijinks"), he was portrayed as the mirror image of Donald: an obstinate braggart, perhaps just a little bit more arrogant, but did not yet have his characteristic luck. In his next two appearances, "Rival Beachcombers" and "The Goldilocks Gambit", Gladstone is portrayed as merely lazy and irritable, and also gullible. The breakthrough of his lucky streak occurs in 1949, within the adventure story "Race to the South Seas!" (March of Comics #41). In that story, Donald and his three nephews set sail on a rescue mission from Duckburg to a remote Pacific island on which Scrooge McDuck is believed to have stranded, in an attempt to gain their uncle's favor. For the same reason Gladstone is in hot pursuit as well, but because he was "born lucky" as Donald explains to his nephews, without lifting a finger, is having a much easier time than them.

His and Donald's rivalry over Daisy is established in "Donald's Love Letters" (1949), "Wild About Flowers" (1950), and "Knightly Rivals" (1951), and as potential heirs to Scrooge's fortune in "Some Heir Over the Rainbow" (1953). After that, Barks felt unable to develop the character further, finding him basically unsympathetic, and began using him less frequently. But by then, Gladstone had found a steady place in the Duck universe as one of the main established characters; frequently used by other writers and artists both in the Americas and Europe. He was first used by an artist other than Barks in 1951: "Presents For All" by Del Connell and Bob Moore. He appears as a main character in the Big Little Book series book "Luck of the Ducks" (1969).

== Character ==
Example of Gladstone Gander's luck and laziness. From "A Financial Fable" (September 14, 1950) by Carl Barks.

Gladstone's good luck defies probability and provides him with anything that would be to his benefit or enjoyment; as well as things he specifically wishes for, which are at times related to the plot of some stories. This could range from finding wallets and other valuables on the sidewalk to pieces of a ripped apart treasure map floating together in river to form it whole again; revealing the treasure's location. His good luck also protects him from any harm. At times he might not even know that a situation will work out in his favor in a later stage and by then often feeling confused or at times even thinking his luck has abandoned him; just to learn that it has been with him all along.

There have been various explanations for Gladstone's good luck over the years by various writers and artists. In Barks' story "Luck of the North" Gladstone proclaims: "I was born under a lucky star, and everything I do will bring me good fortune [...]." This is read from a horoscope book he owns which also has a map showing his lucky star conniving with the planet Neptunus. In many of the Italian comic books stories, Gladstone is bestowed with his luck because Fortuna, the goddess of fortune, is in love with him. In Don Rosa's story "The Sign of the Triple Distelfink" (1997), he added the fact that Gladstone was born on the day of his mother Daphne's birthday in 1920, under the protection sign of the Triple Distelfink, thus inheriting his mother's luck. In some stories he also uses good luck charms like lucky horseshoes or rabbits foots.

However, for all his luck, Gladstone has no achievements to be proud of and no true ambitions, as he is incapable of long-term planning. This is because he does not have to make the slightest of efforts to get what he wants, as his good luck will just give it to him in the end. He also often does not learn any life lessons from any misfortunes he could experience. This leads him to be extremely lazy; at times even thinking that willfully wishing for something is hard work, and disconnected from the realities of ordinary life. All of this is in stark contrast to his relative Scrooge McDuck, who is also capable of taking advantage of opportunities but works hard to create situations favorable for him; is strongly motivated by his ambitions and takes pride in forming his fortune by his own efforts and experiences. Instead, Gladstone often shows pride in his effortlessness and expresses great anxiety if he would betray those ideals. This is something first explored in more detail in Carl Barks's story "Gladstone's Terrible Secret" (May, 1952). Comic artist and writer Don Rosa has commented about this on the character: "Gladstone is unwilling to make the slightest effort to gain something that his luck cannot give him, and, when things go wrong, he resigns immediately, certain that around the next corner a wallet, dropped by a passer-by, will be waiting for him." Gladstone feels open contempt towards work of any kind, claiming it is beneath him, to the point of hesitating to help others even if it is to his own advantage, claiming that it seems alarmingly akin to work.

Also because of his fortune, Gladstone is most often characterized to "be very snobbish and a gloat"; especially toward his cousin Donald to whom he also can be very aggravating. For all of these reasons, he and Donald have formed a rivalry with each other. Gladstone's luck and "boastfulness" toward his cousin, combined with Donald's own "ego" and belief he can still best him despite all odds — or as Don Rosa's version of Donald comments, "Donald's eternal tendency towards self-destruction" — have set the stage for many stories featuring the two cousins' confrontations. They have, however, worked together or at least tolerated each other at times, but this is very rare and not without some tension that easily can turn into their rivalry.

Occasionally, he is a rival to Scrooge McDuck himself who resents his complete reliance on his uncanny good luck. In such stories, often the only way Gladstone can be believably defeated is to have him win by the letter of the original story preset while the heroes later on take the bigger prize. In Carl Barks' story "The Golden Nugget Boat" (Uncle Scrooge #35, September 1961), Gladstone and Scrooge are competing in a gold prospecting contest in which Gladstone finds a gold nugget the nephews fashioned from a gold item Scrooge already owns to stop him from killing himself from overexertion in the contest. Gladstone finds the nugget and returns to win, but Scrooge and his nephews then find a much bigger nugget they are able to fashion into a boat to return to civilization afterward with a monetary worth that is easily more than Gladstone's find. Another instance of this with his rivalry with Donald was in the "Salmon Derby" (Walt Disney's Comics and Stories #167, August 1954), where Gladstone catches the biggest fish and wins a new car but Donald manages to save a wealthy tycoon's daughter and is able to purchase a much bigger car. Another instance was when both Donald and Gladstone were competing for a job as a cameraman for a nature film director because Daisy was the director's assistant, Gladstone got the job but wished he had not because he wound up trudging through a swamp to film giant spiders while Daisy stayed behind in America, with Donald.

In more modern stories where he takes a more protagonistic role, writers most often downplay his unlikability to make him more relatable. For example, showing that he can learn from potential bad experiences, even if they never would become reality, and put more emphasis on his love for his family, even if he at times has a hard time expressing these feelings.

In many stories, Gladstone is also considered among the prime candidates for Scrooge McDuck's succession. In "Some Heir Over the Rainbow" (Walt Disney's Comics and Stories #155, August 1953) by Carl Barks, Scrooge gives $1,000 to Donald, Gladstone, and Huey, Dewey and Louie to determine how they use it in order to be the most suitable heir to his fortune. Gladstone thinks of using the money to buy a television set until he finds a raffle ticket, in which he decides to save the money by placing it in a tree. Scrooge is unimpressed that Gladstone did not increase the money at all, but acknowledges that at least he still "had" it. Huey, Dewey, and Louie infuriate Scrooge by investing their money in what Scrooge assumes was a scam. Finally, Scrooge thinks to himself, "I guess my heir will have to be Gladstone Gander! .... What an awful injustice to the world!" Soon afterwards, however, the children's decision proves to be the wisest, and they become Scrooge's heirs instead of Gladstone.

He is a rival of Donald for the love of his girlfriend Daisy Duck. This is often portrayed either by showing Daisy uncertain of which one she likes the most or; the more common version, that she is angry with Donald and goes out with Gladstone instead to make Donald jealous. In modern comics this love-triangle is at times often more downplayed. However, despite having an eternal crush on Daisy Duck, Gladstone has appeared in love with other duck girls in Italian and Danish comic stories. One of those is Linda Paper, who really conquered Gladstone, making him want to give up all his luck, since she is unlucky and absolutely hates lucky people. She appeared in two subsequent comic stories. Another is Feather Mallard, who is as lucky as Gladstone but whenever they are together they are instead experiencing bad luck. A number of recent Italian stories feature Gladstone's protector goddess Fortuna appearing in person. She appears in one noteworthy tale, "Gastone e il debole dalla Fortuna" ("Gladstone and the Struck of Luck"), by Enrico Faccini and Augusto Macchetto, first published on March 24, 1998. In this story, the Goddess takes mortal guise in order to be able to date her favorite gander, and appears to be love-struck with him. Although Gladstone competes for Daisy's attention and affection with Donald and often loses, he reassures himself that at least he still has his extraordinary luck, because in the end he is a hedonist and the only person he really adores is himself.

His exact relation to the Duck Family Tree at its early stages was somewhat uncertain. In Carl Barks' original version of the family tree from the 1950s, Gladstone was the son of Luke the Goose and Daphne Duck who died by overeating at a free-lunch picnic. He was later adopted by Matilda McDuck and Goosetave Gander. Later, Barks is reported to have done away with the adoption, which was never featured in any story. (Of course, no stories denying the event were published.) In a more recent version of the family tree created by Don Rosa, with input from Barks, it was established that Daphne Duck (Donald's paternal aunt) married Goostave Gander and the two were Gladstone's parents. This is consistent with what Gladstone says in "Race to the South Seas": "Scrooge McDuck is my mother's brother's brother-in-law".

Gladstone has a nephew named Shamrock Gladstone who shares his propensity for luck. He also has a con artist cousin (not on Donald's side of the family) named Disraeli Duck.

== Animation ==
Gladstone Gander in the DuckTales 1987 episode, "Dime Enough for Luck".

Gladstone Gander as he appears in DuckTales 2017.

Gladstone makes two speaking appearances in the animated series DuckTales, where he was voiced by Rob Paulsen. In these episodes he is not characterized as much of a braggart he is in the comics but rather focusing much more on his care-free nature, and additionally acting a bit more foolishly. In the episode "Dime Enough for Luck", Gladstone is an unwitting stooge for Magica De Spell in one of her attempts to steal Scrooge's Number One Dime. He returns in the episode "Dr. Jekyll & Mr. McDuck", where he accidentally bids on an item that turns out to be valuable. This inspires Scrooge to bid on the next item—a trunk containing Dr. Jekyll's formula—which sets the plot in motion. He also makes non-speaking cameo appearances in the episodes "Sweet Duck of Youth" and "Till Nephews Do Us Part", as well in episode of House of Mouse titled "Goofy For A Day". Gladstone appears in the 2000 video game Donald Duck: Goin' Quackers in his traditional role of Donald's rival for Daisy's affection, and every time a Boss Battle is about to start, Gladstone greets Donald, but always gets hurt, becoming squished by a giant bird, getting knocked off a building by a wrecking ball, being sent crashing to the bottom of a haunted mansion, and even gets sent back to Duckburg inside a pipe, and every time he gets hurt, he says that he has found a nickel. He also appears in the DuckTales reboot, first appearing in the episode "The House of the Lucky Gander!". In this series, he is voiced by Paul F. Tompkins. This series brings his personality far closer to how he acts in the comics, although it is implied that he is genuinely unaware of how arrogant he is.

== See also ==
- Duck family (Disney)
- Gladstone Publishing
