= Donald Duck (American comic book) =

1942–2017 American Disney comics magazine

Donald Duck and Friends #317, June 2004 (Gemstone Publishing)

Donald Duck, also known as Donald Duck and Friends, is an American Disney comic book series starring the character Donald Duck and published by various publishers from October 1942 to June 2017. As with many early Disney comics titles, Donald Duck began as individual issues of Dell Comics' Four Color one-shots series. It was published as its own regular series in November 1952, starting with issue #26.

Donald Duck featured many early stories by Carl Barks, including the first American Donald Duck comic book story, Donald Duck Finds Pirate Gold. All of the stories in the first nine years of the comic were written and drawn by Barks.

The comic passed through many different publishers. Western Publishing produced the book from 1962 to 1984 (issues #85-245), and it was then revived by Gladstone Publishing from 1986 to 1998 (issues #246-307).

From 2003 to 2006, the comic was renamed Donald Duck and Friends by Gemstone Publishing (issues #308-347). Boom! Studios continued the series under that title, but reverted to Donald Duck near the end of its 2009–2011 run (issues #347-367).

When IDW took over publishing Donald Duck in May 2015 they restarted from #1, but retained the 'legacy' numbering as a secondary number (issue #1 is also #368). IDW cancelled the book in 2017; the last issue published by IDW was #21 (#388) in June 2017.

Fantagraphics relaunched the comic in December 2025 as a bi-monthly title with a new issue #1 (legacy #389).

== Four Color one-shots ==
The first American Donald Duck comic book story, Donald Duck Finds Pirate Gold, was published as Four Color #9, October 1942. The story was written by Bob Karp and illustrated by Carl Barks and Jack Hannah, beginning Barks' decades-long career as "the Good Duck Artist". Barks wrote and drew all 21 of the Donald Duck Four Color issues between 1942 and May 1951, ultimately penning 24 out of the total 29.

In 1943, Barks began his run of Donald Duck 10-page stories in Walt Disney's Comics and Stories, often pitting Donald in competition with his nephews Huey, Dewey and Louie, or his next-door adversary Neighbor Jones. The stories published in Donald Duck enriched the character, as historian Alberto Becattini points out: "In the longer adventures which appeared in Four Color Comics, Donald and his nephews acted more like a team, and though luck did not necessarily seem to favor him, the Duck was often the winner in the end, showing qualities and feelings that made him even more sympathetic to the readers".

The second issue, "Donald Duck and the Mummy's Ring" (Four Color #29, Sept 1943), was the first long Duck story written and drawn by Barks, and it established patterns that would soon become standards. Donald and the nephews are swept up into an adventure with life-and-death stakes, although there are many comedic gags to lighten the tone. There are nasty criminals, mistaken identities, humorous coincidences and a surprise ending. The boys also get a tour of an exotic setting, with many detailed panels of Egyptian landmarks, painstakingly copied from Barks' collection of National Geographic magazines.

While Donald and his nephews mostly stayed close to home in the WDC&S 10-page stories, the Four Color adventure stories sent the ducks to more exotic locales. The third issue, "Frozen Gold" (Jan 1945), took them to Alaska; the fourth, "The Terror of the River!" (1946), takes place on a houseboat traveling to New Orleans; and the fifth, "Volcano Valley" (May 1947), involves a trip to the Central American nation of Volcanovia. These periodic adventures helped Barks to deepen the ducks' characterization—not just putting them in new settings, but broadening the kinds of events and experiences that they could react to.

At first, the Donald Duck issues were released on a roughly annual basis—the first four came out in 1942, 1943, 1945 and 1946—but beginning in 1947, Barks produced three issues a year. This included "Volcano Valley", "The Ghost of the Grotto" (Aug 1947) and "Christmas on Bear Mountain" (Dec 1947), the first story featuring Donald's uncle, Scrooge McDuck. Barks' second Uncle Scrooge adventure, "The Old Castle's Secret", was published in Donald Duck in June 1948.

In 1950, the rate of Donald Duck one-shots increased to five issues a year, and then to six issues a year in 1951. At that point, other writers and artists were enlisted to create the Donald Duck adventure stories. The first three issues of 1951 were Barks creations -- "Dangerous Disguise" (Jan 1951), "No Such Varmint" (March 1951) and "In Old California" (May 1951), but these were followed by "Donald Duck and the Magic Fountain" (July 1951, written by Del Connell and drawn by Bob Moore), "The Crocodile Collector" (Sept 1951, by Don Christensen and Frank McSavage) and "Rags to Riches" (Nov 1951, Frank McSavage).

In 1952, Barks wrote four of the six Donald Duck issues, including the classics "A Christmas for Shacktown" (Jan 1952) and "The Golden Helmet" (July 1952).

== Dell Comics series ==
Starting with the November 1952 issue, Dell transitioned Donald Duck from a bimonthly series of one-shots to its own bimonthly series. Dell called the first Donald Duck issue #26, counting the previous issues as if they'd always been part of the series. Unfortunately, the numbering was a mistake, as Four Color #422 was actually the 29th Four Color issue titled "Donald Duck".

The first issue of the new series led with a Carl Barks Halloween story, "Trick or Treat", which was based on the October 1952 Donald Duck short of the same name. That was Barks' last contribution to the Donald Duck comic for several years. In 1953, Barks' attention turned to producing a quarterly Uncle Scrooge comic, and the bimonthly Donald Duck passed to other creators. Barks returned to Donald Duck periodically, writing eight more stories over the next eighteen years, ending with three that were drawn by other artists -- "Pawns of the Loup Garou" in Donald Duck #117 (Jan 1968, drawn by Tony Strobl), "Officer for a Day" in #126 (July 1969, also Strobl) and "A Day in a Duck's Life" in #138 (July 1971, drawn by Kay Wright).

Most of the issues from 1954 to 1972 were drawn by Tony Strobl, including "The Kitchy-Kaw Diamond" (#40, March 1955), "Rainbow Island Rendezvous" (#41, May 1955), "The Mysterious Crewless Ship" (#47, May 1956), "The Secret of the Glacier" (#51, Jan 1957), "One for the Whammy" (#65, May 1959), "The Stone Money Mystery" (#69, Jan 1960) and "Secret of the Sargasso Sea" (#72, July 1960).

== Western Publishing ==
In 1962, all of Dell Comics' Disney comic books moved to Western Publishing, who released them first under the Gold Key Comics imprint, and then as Whitman Publishing. Gold Key continued the Donald Duck comic, beginning with issue #85 (Dec 1962).

Donald's seafaring relative Moby Duck premiered in issue #112 (March 1967) in "A Whale of an Adventure", written by Vic Lockman and illustrated by Strobl. Moby returned two issues later in "The Jewels of Skull Rock" (#114, July 1967), and then graduated to his own series in October.

In 1972, Strobl left Western to write for the Disney Studio Program; his last Donald Duck story was "The Siren's Whistle" in issue #142 (March 1972). John Carey took Strobl's place as the main artist for the original Donald Duck stories starting with issue #144 (July 1972).

Starting with issue #147 (Jan 1973), Donald Duck began alternating new stories with reprints of earlier issues. Four years later, the comic moved to all reprints; the last original story of the 1970s was "Inspiration Hunt", a story written and drawn by Bob Gregory in issue #186 (Aug 1977).

In 1979, Western Publishing was bought by toy company Mattel, and the management decided to stop publishing comic books for newsstands, preferring to sell bagged sets of three comics at department, variety and grocery stores. At this point, they stopped publishing the comics as Gold Key Comics and switched to Whitman Comics, another Western Publishing imprint.

The first issue of Donald Duck under the Whitman label was #212, published in October 1979. The comic continued to be mostly reprints, with only a few original stories. Sales declined, and the release schedule became erratic. They even managed to print the same reprint issue twice in a little over a year—issue #222 (Oct 1980) was a reprint of a 1969 issue led by the Carl Fallberg/Tony Strobl story "The Fuddleduck Diggin's", and then issue #235 (Jan 1982) reprinted the same stories, using the same cover. The series came to an end in 1984, with issue #245 reprinting three Vic Lockman/Tony Strobl stories from 1968.

== Gladstone Publishing ==
Gladstone Publishing got the license to publish Disney comics in 1986, and began publishing the four core comics in October: Walt Disney's Comics and Stories, Uncle Scrooge, Mickey Mouse and Donald Duck. Gladstone's approach was to publish an equal mix of the best classic stories (which in Donald Duck's case meant Carl Barks reprints), and new stories from Denmark and the Netherlands.

Gladstone began Donald Duck with issue #246 (Oct 1986), reprinting Barks' The Gilded Man from 1952, and issue #250 (Feb 1987) went all the way back to the beginning, reprinting "Donald Duck Finds Pirate Gold!" from the first Four Color issue in 1942. Gladstone also printed stories by Volker Reiche and Daan Jippes first published in the Netherlands' Donald Duck Weekblad, and stories drawn by Vicar and Daniel Branca from Denmark's Anders And & C:o.

The new comics were a success, and in 1987, Gladstone began publishing a second Donald Duck book, Donald Duck Adventures.

In issue #262 (March 1988), Gladstone's Donald Duck spotlighted a reprint of a 1938 sequence from Al Taliaferro's Donald Duck comic strip which introduced Gus Goose as Donald's troublesome cousin. Gus was featured on the cover, and an accompanying text piece described the history of the character in cartoons, comic strips and comics.

In 1990, the Walt Disney Company—seeing that Gladstone was successful at marketing Disney comics—revoked Gladstone's license, and began their own Disney Comics line. Gladstone's final issue of Donald Duck was a double-sized #279 (May 1990).

The next month, Disney published their first set of comics, starting again with the core four comics. Walt Disney's Comics & Stories and Uncle Scrooge continued their legacy numbering, but the Mickey Mouse and Donald Duck books were retitled Mickey Mouse Adventures and Donald Duck Adventures, starting with a new issue #1. The original Donald Duck series had to wait three years before it resumed.

== Gladstone Publishing, 2nd series ==
Disney's attempt at comics publishing only lasted three years, from 1990 to 1993. When Disney cancelled their books, they returned the license to Gladstone Publishing, which picked up from where they left off. Gladstone's second line included both Donald Duck and Donald Duck Adventures, which resumed their numbering from the first Gladstone run.

The new Donald Duck Adventures contained the longer adventure stories, mixing occasional reprints of Barks stories with new stories by Don Rosa, William Van Horn and others. With DDA taking the adventure stories and the revived Walt Disney's Comics & Stories printing traditional Donald Duck 10-page stories (mostly new ones by Van Horn), Donald Duck focused almost entirely on the past—specifically, the Al Taliaferro comic strips from the 1930s and 40s.

Starting with issue #280 (July 1993) and for the next 20 issues, almost every issue contained one 10-page story by Carl Barks (or Don Rosa, in issue #283), with the rest of the pages filled with Taliaferro reprints, in chronological order.

The historical focus of the title continued in issue #286 (Sept 1994), a 64-page special celebrating the character's 60th anniversary, featuring a special anniversary story by Don Rosa, and a reprint of the first Donald Duck adventure story from 1937, Federico Pedrocchi's "Paolino Paperino e il mistero di Marte" ("Donald Duck and the Secret of Mars") published in the Italian comic Donald Duck and Other Adventures (Paperino e altre avventure).

Issue #300 (Jan 1997) also broke the Barks/Taliaferro format, celebrating the milestone with a Dutch story by Evert Geradts and Mau Heymans originally written to celebrate the 2000th issue of the weekly Donald Duck Weekblad. The issue also featured the first American printing of one of Marco Rota's "Andold Wild Duck" stories.

Gladstone continued with the 10-pager/Taliaferro format until the end of the run, with issue #307 (March 1998).

== Gemstone Publishing ==
Five years later, publisher Steve Geppi got the license to publish Disney comics, and continued where Gladstone left off, even with the same creative staff. Now under Gemstone Publishing, the team retitled the Duck book Donald Duck and Friends, and continued Gladstone's numbering, with #308 coming out in September 2003.

While the last Gladstone run had focused on the past, the new Donald Duck and Friends published recent stories created for the Danish publisher Egmont. Most issues had three stories: a 10-16 page Donald Duck story, a 10-page Mickey Mouse story, and a 6-10 page story featuring one of the other Donald Duck universe characters, including Uncle Scrooge, Gyro Gearloose, Daisy Duck and Grandma Duck.

Almost all of the stories were from the late 1990s and early 2000s, often by creators that were previously unknown in the US, including Noel Van Horn, Pat and Carol McGreal, César Ferioli and Stefan Petrucha.

When the sales dipped lower than expected, Gemstone returned to a previously successful strategy: publishing Carl Barks stories. Issue #325 (March 2005) reprinted "Lost in the Andes!", #332 (Oct 2005) published "Trick or Treat", #339 (May 2006) ran "In Ancient Persia", and #344 "Pawns of the Loup Garou".

Gemstone's Disney comics run ended in December 2006; the last issue of Donald Duck and Friends was #346.

== Boom! Studios ==
Three years later, Boom! Studios picked up the Disney license, and began releasing a new slate of comics, including Donald Duck and Friends, which began with issue #347 (Nov 2009).

Boom! used two new strategies at the start of their run. The first was to use variant covers to encourage collectors to purchase multiple copies of each issue; every issue from #347 to 356 had two or three covers each.

The other strategy was to use non-traditional subseries for the Mickey Mouse and Donald Duck books, attempting to attract a new audience with modern storylines. Boom!'s Mickey Mouse and Friends began with the Italian fantasy-world story "Wizards of Mickey", and Donald Duck and Friends began with "DoubleDuck", an Italian subseries in which Donald is transformed into a secret agent. "DoubleDuck" is darker than traditional Donald Duck stories—both literally using a darker color scheme, as well as a darker, less comedic tone. The characters all keep secrets, and don't trust each other; one of the main characters is revealed to be a double agent. Boom! published 12 issues of the "DoubleDuck" storyline, from #347 to #358, comprising four complete stories originally published in Topolino.

The next four issues (#359-362) featured stories about Donald Duck doing martial arts. The first two reprinted "Son of the Rising Sun", an Italian story from 1989. The third and fourth reprinted other Donald martial-arts stories from Italy and Denmark.

In 2011, with the Disney line struggling, Boom! followed the same path as Gladstone and Gemstone ultimately did: they printed Carl Barks stories. The line pivoted to a celebration of "70 years of Disney comics", with all of the comics reprinting favorite stories from the past, as well as anniversary stories and sequels. Issue #363 (Feb 2011) featured the Barks 10-pager "Mystery of the Loch", and two recent Dutch stories that returned to the typical cast and locations of traditional Duck comics. The comic's title also reverted from Donald Duck and Friends back to Donald Duck.

In issues #364 and 365 (March–April 2011), Donald Duck featured one of the earliest Donald Duck adventure stories: "Donald Duck, Special Correspondent", from the 1938 Italian comic Paperino e altre avventure. Issue #366 (May 2011) featured "Donald Duck Finds Pirate Gold... Again!", a 1962 Italian sequel to Barks' first Duck adventure, the 1942 tale "Donald Duck Finds Pirate Gold". The final issue, #367 (June 2011), reprinted a 2006 story written by Carl Barks and drawn by Daan Jippes.

Boom!'s Disney comic line ended in 2011.

== IDW Publishing ==
In 2015, IDW Publishing obtained the Disney comics license and began publishing their own set of comics. IDW restarted Donald Duck's numbering over from #1, but also retained a secondary legacy numbering system that continued the series with #368. The new series continued Boom! Studios' variant covers gimmick; almost every issue had three different covers, and #1 had five.

This series featured a wide mix of stories, with contributions from Italy, Denmark, the Netherlands, the Disney Studio Program, and American stories seeing their first reprint. The most common source was Italian comics from the late 1960s and 70s, with stories by Romano Scarpa, Luciano Bottaro and Giorgio Cavazzano leading many issues.

Issue #5 and 6 (Sept/Oct 2015) presented "The True Origin of the Diabolical Duck Avenger"—an Italian story from June 1969 by Elisa Penna, Guido Martina and Giovan Battista Carpi that introduced Paperinik, Donald Duck's costumed vigilante alter ego which began as a way to get revenge on his own relatives, but later became a crime-fighting superhero. For the English translation, IDW used "the Duck Avenger". The second "Duck Avenger" story was presented in issues #14 and 15 (June/July 2016), and then IDW began a six-issue Duck Avenger spin-off series, reprinting stories from the 1996 Italian series PKNA.

Slow sales prompted IDW to drop most of their Disney comics titles in 2017, and Donald Duck's last issue was #21, aka #388 (June 2017).

== Fantagraphics ==
In October 2025, Fantagraphics became the publisher of the classic Disney comic titles after having published archival collections of Disney comics since 2011. Donald Duck returned as a bi-monthly title with issue #1 (legacy #389) releasing in December 2025.

== Publishers ==
- Western Publishing
  - Dell Comics as Four Color: 29 Donald Duck issues from #9 (Oct 1942) to #422 (Sept 1952)
  - Dell Comics, from issue #26 (Nov 1952) to issue #84 (Sept 1962)
  - Gold Key Comics, from issue #85 (Dec 1962) to issue #211 (Sept 1979)
  - Whitman Publishing, from issue #212 (Oct 1979) to issue #245 (1984)
- Gladstone Publishing (1st series), from issue #246 (Oct 1986) to issue #279 (May 1990)
- Gladstone Publishing (2nd series), from issue #280 (Sept 1993) to issue #307 (March 1998)
- Gemstone Publishing, from issue #308 (Sept 2003) to issue #346 (Dec 2006); the comic book was renamed Donald Duck and Friends
- Boom! Studios, from issue #347 (Nov 2009) to issue #367 (June 2011); the comic book was renamed Donald Duck from #363
- IDW Publishing, from issue #1 (May 2015) to issue #21 (June 2017); the numbering restarted from #1, with a secondary numbering system continuing the legacy numbering (#368-388). Some of the run was collected in Timeless Tales book series.
- Fantagraphics, from issue #1 (December 2025) to present (legacy #389-).

== Reprints ==
The Carl Barks Donald Duck stories have been reprinted many times around the world. In the United States, there have been three major reprint series of Barks' work: The Carl Barks Library (1984-1990), The Carl Barks Library in Color (Gladstone, 1992-1998) and The Complete Carl Barks Disney Library (Fantagraphics, 2011–present).

Of the five Four Color lead stories not written by Barks, only two of them have been reprinted in the US, both in 1976 issues of Donald Duck.

== See also ==
- Disney comics
- Disney comics titles in the USA:
  - Mickey Mouse Magazine (1935-1940)
  - Walt Disney's Comics and Stories (1940–2020)
  - Donald Duck (1942-)
  - Mickey Mouse (1943-)
  - Uncle Scrooge (1952–)
  - Walt Disney Comics Digest (1968-1976)
  - Uncle Scrooge Adventures (1987-1997)
  - Mickey Mouse Adventures (1990-1991)
  - Donald Duck Adventures (1988-1998)
  - Walt Disney Giant (1995-1996)
