= Mickey Mouse (comic book) =

1941–2017 American Disney comics magazine

- Cover of Mickey Mouse and Friends #296 (September 2009), "Cover A"

Publication information
- Publisher: Dell Comics, Gold Key Comics, Whitman, Gladstone Publishing, Gemstone Publishing, Boom! Kids (Boom! Studios), IDW Publishing, Fantagraphics
- Format: Ongoing series
- Publication date: 1941–
- Main character: Mickey Mouse

Mickey Mouse (briefly Mickey Mouse and Friends) is a Disney comic book series that has a long-running history, first appearing in 1943 as part of the Four Color one-shot series. It received its own numbering system with issue #28 (December 1952).

The book emphasizes stories with Mickey and his supporting cast: Goofy, Donald Duck, Minnie Mouse, Pluto and Mickey's nephews Morty and Ferdie Fieldmouse. Mickey's perpetual rival is the criminal Peg-Leg Pete (sometimes "Black Pete", "Sneaky Pete" or "Big Bad Pete"). Other adversaries have included Emil Eagle, Eli Squinch, Sylvester Shyster, the team of Dangerous Dan McBoo and Idjit the Midget, and the Phantom Blot. Two major artistic influences on the appearance of Mickey in comics are Floyd Gottfredson, who drew the Mickey Mouse comic strip from 1930 to 1975, and comic book artist Paul Murry, who drew Mickey stories from 1950 to 1984.

== Early development ==
In the mid 1930s original Mickey comic book stories were being produced in Italy and the United Kingdom for local consumption. In the UK, Dean & Son Ltd published the first Mickey Mouse Annual for Christmas 1930, which was made up of one-page Mickey & Minnie gag cartoons by Wilfred Haughton.

Publishing Mickey comic book stories in the United States was pioneered by the third Mickey Mouse Magazine series (1935–1940). Initially published by Hal Horne, it had artwork by John Stanley and text pieces by Irving Brecher. By mid-1936, Horne turned over the magazine to Kay Kamen, who oversaw merchandising for Disney.

Kamen the following year recruited Western Publishing to handle production and publication. Western added reprinted Disney comic strips to the book's lineup beginning with the July 1937 issue; these included Gottfredson's Mickey daily strips re-formatted and colored for serialized magazine publication. In the words of historian Michael Barrier: "Reprinted newspaper comics were never more than a minor part of its lineup until the very last issue, dated September 1940, when they suddenly took up half the pages". But Barrier has also judged the strip reprints "stood out by virtue of their crisp professionalism". The successor title, Walt Disney's Comics and Stories (WDC&S), described by Barrier as a true comic book, began publication with the Oct. 1940 issue and had the Gottfredson serials as a prominent feature.

Starting in 1943, Mickey's adventures appeared in a series of Dell Comics' Four Color one-shots with the name "Mickey Mouse" prominently displayed on the cover. In 1953, these one-shots evolved into a regular series titled Mickey Mouse, starting with issue #28 and lasting through 1990.

Although other magazines called Mickey Mouse were available in many countries, they often were less like the American title and more resembled WDC&S, acting as the flagship Disney title for its circulation area and thus containing stories of all the major Disney characters as a function of its anthology format.

== Classic era ==
The American Mickey Mouse title experienced changes in artists, publishers, length, cost, and printing quality over the years. A unique experiment deviating from the norm occurred in 1966: Inspired by the James Bond spy mania of the period for three issues (#107–109) the comic was titled Mickey Mouse, Super Secret Agent with stories of Mickey and Goofy becoming international spies and interacting with human characters in realistic settings. While Mickey and Goofy were drawn in the usual "cartoony" style by Paul Murry, the other characters and backgrounds were done by Dan Spiegle in a realistic manner. Comic book historian Michael Barrier dubbed it an aesthetic failure in a contemporary review. They dropped the concept after three issues.

By 1970, contents of the Mickey Mouse title mostly consisted of the reprinting of earlier stories, sometimes from Walt Disney's Comics and Stories or other Disney publications. The average paid circulation between September 1969 and September 1970, when the comic was published six times a year, and cost 15 cents, was 223,396, whereas in 1960 the figure stood at 568,803.

== Modern era ==
=== Gladstone ===
Gladstone Publishing assumed publication of Mickey Mouse in 1986, still publishing reprints, but which were recolored, taking advantage of more modern inking and printing techniques. Stories from foreign Walt Disney comic books were also translated and included. Issues contained a description of the source of each story, and gave credit to the writers and artists by name — which had not previously been done. Letters to the editor often provided additional story background.

Although the circulation of Mickey Mouse had declined for years, especially compared to Uncle Scrooge, in 1987 Gladstone said it had become their top selling title. Even so, in late 1987 Gladstone announced they were cutting all their publications back to eight issues per year (because comics sell less well in fall and winter). The cover price went to 95 cents in 1987 (equivalent to $2.69 in 2025). Gladstone published many of Gottfredson's Mickey stories that had never been reprinted since the 1930s or 1940s. Mickey Mouse ceased publication in 1990, with issue #256, when Gladstone lost their license to publish the Disney characters.

=== Publication hiatus ===
From 1990 to 2003, no Mickey Mouse comic book was published in the United States. However, from 1990 to 1991, a new comic book, Mickey Mouse Adventures, was published by Disney's then-new comic book imprint, Disney Comics. Disney Comics ceased all publications in 1993.

Additionally, the two part "Perils of Mickey" adventure, "Return to Blaggard Castle/Shadows of the Past", by writer David Cody Weiss and artist Stephen DeStefano, was published in two consecutive 1993 issues of Disney Adventures magazine. This story was a direct sequel to the 1930s Floyd Gottfredson story, "Blaggard Castle", and featured a return to the classic Mickey Mouse art style. The story has been reprinted in Walt Disney's Mickey Mouse: "Trapped on Treasure Island" (1932–33 dailies; 2011) ISBN 978-1-60699-495-5.

=== Gemstone ===
In 2003, Gemstone Publishing was granted the license for Disney's comic book characters. They relaunched Mickey Mouse under an expanded title, Mickey Mouse and Friends, continuing the original numbering from #257. The printing of Mickey Mouse and Friends was high quality, and the cost was $2.95. Similar to Gladstone's practice, most advertising in the issues was for Gemstone's own products.

Gemstone also took over publication of Mickey Mouse Adventures magazine, converting it to a digest, and announcing that it was the first "Disney controlled" comic publication in Disney comics' 55-year history that had not been not licensed to other publishers such as Dell, Gold Key and Gladstone.

In 2006, Gemstone ceased publication of both Mickey Mouse Adventures and Mickey Mouse and Friends (along with several non-Mickey titles), leaving WDC&S as the only outlet for Mickey Mouse comic book stories in the United States until 2009.

=== Boom! Kids ===
In 2009, Boom! Studios assumed the license for Disney's stable of comic book characters and resumed publication of both Mickey Mouse and Friends and WDC&S under their Boom! Kids imprint, continuing the original issue numbering. Boom! Studios' Mickey Mouse and Friends contains full-issue, multi-part modern stories originally created in Europe and translated to English.

Boom! Studios began serializing the multi-part Italian Wizards of Mickey epic from MM #296–299. It then spun off into its own title. To date, there have been many "Wizards of Mickey" sagas produced and published in Italy, most yet unpublished in the USA.

As with Boom! Studios' other Disney-related titles, two versions of each issue of Mickey Mouse and Friends were released in early months; one with "Cover A", the other with "Cover B". Aside from the two different covers, the two versions of each issue were identical and had the same contents.

The first Boom! Studios issue of Mickey Mouse and Friends was issue #296, released in September 2009. According to a Boom! Studios press release, the issue sold out immediately upon release. Boom! put the series on hiatus with #299 for several months, with the big #300 anniversary issue to be published September 2010.

Beginning with issue #300, the series reverted to a mixture of new and vintage Mickey stories set in Mickey's everyday life. Issue #304 was the last issue to feature two variant covers; from #305 on, each issue has been printed with a single cover design. The original title Mickey Mouse replaced Mickey Mouse & Friends beginning with issue #304.

In 2011, the Boom! Studios titles changed to Kaboom!, but by October of that year all Disney comics, including Mickey Mouse, ceased publication. Kaboom's final Mickey Mouse single issue was #309.

=== IDW Publishing ===
In 2015, IDW Publishing in San Diego began publishing new Disney comics. The first new Mickey Mouse comic was numbered "#1 (310)" and was released on June 3, 2015. IDW also relaunched Donald Duck, Uncle Scrooge and Walt Disney's Comics and Stories at the time.

IDW issues of Mickey Mouse, generally containing 35–40 pages of comics apiece, are slightly longer than the earlier Boom and Gemstone issues, and tend to feature extended-length adventure stories from two of the best-known Italian Mickey creators, Romano Scarpa and Andrea "Casty" Castellan. Co-stars such as Eurasia Toft and Ellsworth are featured prominently; the former for the first time in the United States, and the second for the first time in many years. Shorter backup stories by the likes of Noel Van Horn and Lars Jensen have also been included. IDW's run ended in 2017 with #21 (330). Mickey stories would afterwards be featured in Walt Disney's Comics and Stories and the short-lived Donald and Mickey until IDW ceased publishing Disney titles in 2020.

Some of the title's IDW Publishing run was collected in the hardcover book series Timeless Tales.

=== Fantagraphics ===
In October 2025, Fantagraphics became the publisher of the classic Disney comic titles after having published archival collections of Disney comics since 2011. Mickey Mouse returned as a bi-monthly title with a #1 and legacy numbering #331 in November 2025.

== Publication summary ==
- Dell Comics – title began as a selection of Four Color one-shots, starting with Four Color #16 ("Mickey Mouse Outwits the Phantom Blot", 1941). The regular series launched with Mickey Mouse #28 (Dec./Jan. 1952/1953), and was published by Dell until issue #84 (Jul./Sep. 1962).
- Gold Key Comics (1962–1980; Mickey Mouse #85–204)
- Whitman (1980–1984; Mickey Mouse #205–218)
- Gladstone Publishing (1986–1990; Mickey Mouse #219-#256)
- Gemstone Publishing (2003–2006; Walt Disney's Mickey Mouse and Friends #257–295)
- BOOM! Studios (2009–2011 Mickey Mouse and Friends #296–309, reverting to just Mickey Mouse from #304)
- IDW Publishing (2015-2017 Mickey Mouse #1 -21 (#310-330)
- Fantagraphics (2025- Mickey Mouse #1 (#331-)

== See also ==
- Disney comics
- Disney comics titles in the USA:
  - Mickey Mouse Magazine (1935–1940)
  - Walt Disney's Comics and Stories (1940–2020)
  - Donald Duck (1942–)
  - Mickey Mouse (1943–)
  - Uncle Scrooge (1952–)
  - Walt Disney Comics Digest (1968–1976)
  - Uncle Scrooge Adventures (1987–1997)
  - Mickey Mouse Adventures (1990–1991)
  - Donald Duck Adventures (1987–1998)
  - Walt Disney Giant (1995–1996)
