= Walt Disney Giant =

Comic book

Publication information
- Publisher: Gladstone Publishing
- Schedule: Bimonthly
- Format: ongoing
- Publication date: September 1995 - September 1996
- No. of issues: 7
- Main character(s): Scrooge McDuck; Mickey Mouse

Walt Disney Giant is a forty-eight page, bimonthly Disney comic book published by Gladstone Publishing from September 1995 to September 1996. It featured the adventures of Scrooge McDuck, his nephews, Mickey Mouse, and other Disney characters.

== Index ==
Issue number	Story	Pages
1	Hearts of the Yukon featuring Scrooge McDuck, by Don Rosa	24
2	The Mines of King Solomon featuring Scrooge McDuck, by Carl Barks	27
3	Super Snooper featuring Donald Duck, by Carl Barks	10
4	The Mysterious Stranger featuring Goofy, by Greg Crosby, Hector Adolfo de Urtiága and Horacio Saavedra	44
5	Fantasy Island featuring Mickey Mouse, by Byron Erickson, Cesar Feroli, et al.	23
6	The Day the Mountain Shook featuring The Junior Woodchucks, by Carl Barks and Daan Jippes	13
7	Micro-Ducks From Outer Space featuring Scrooge McDuck, by Carl Barks	24

== See also ==
- Disney comics
- Disney comics titles in the USA:
  - Mickey Mouse Magazine (1935-1940)
  - Walt Disney's Comics and Stories (1940-2020)
  - Donald Duck (1942-2017)
  - Mickey Mouse (1943-2017)
  - Uncle Scrooge (1952-2020)
  - Walt Disney Comics Digest (1968-1976)
  - Uncle Scrooge Adventures (1987-1997)
  - Mickey Mouse Adventures (1990-1991)
  - Donald Duck Adventures (1988-1998)
  - Walt Disney Giant (1995-1996)
