= Mickey Mouse Magazine =

1935–1940 American Disney comics magazine

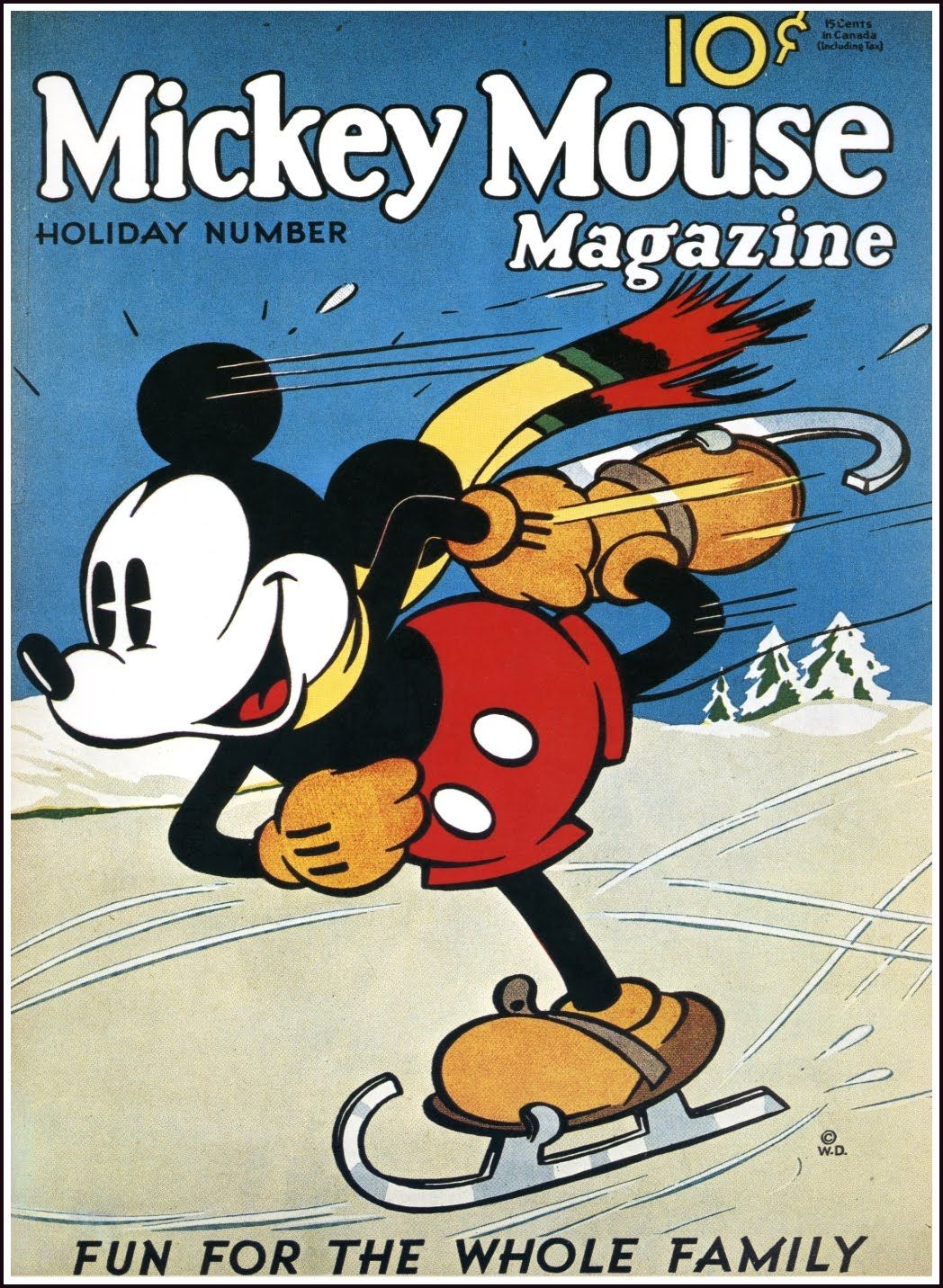
Cover of Mickey Mouse Magazine (3rd series) #4 (holiday issue)

Mickey Mouse Magazine is an American Disney comics publication that preceded the popular 1940 anthology comic book Walt Disney's Comics and Stories. There were three versions of the title – two promotional giveaway magazines published from 1933 to 1935, and a newsstand magazine published from 1935 to 1940. The publication gradually evolved from a 16-page booklet of illustrated text stories and single-page comic panels into a 64-page comic book featuring reprints of the Mickey Mouse and Donald Duck comic strips.

The first version of the magazine was founded by Kay Kamen, the merchandising representative for Walt Disney Enterprises, and was given away by department stores and movie theaters that promoted Disney products. Nine issues were printed between January and September 1933. In November 1933, the second version was launched as a promotional giveaway for local dairies, edited by United Artists publicist and gag writer Hal Horne. 24 issues were published, until October 1935.

In summer 1935, the third Mickey Mouse Magazine was published by Horne, with the support of Kamen and Walt Disney Enterprises. This was a full-size newsstand magazine of short stories, poems, puzzles and comic panels, which promoted Disney films, cartoons and products. In the magazine's first year, Horne went into debt and had to turn the magazine over to Kamen, who continued the publication. In 1937, Kamen went into partnership with Western Printing and Lithographing Company, who evolved the magazine's content and format over several years into its final form, Walt Disney's Comics and Stories, which became one of the best-selling comic books of all time.

== 1st series (1933) ==
In 1932, Kay Kamen became the merchandising representative for Walt Disney Enterprises. In January 1933, he and business partner Streeter Blair (as Kamen-Blair) launched the first version of Mickey Mouse Magazine. The publication was a 16-page digest-sized booklet with a two-color cover printed in black and red, with a black-and-white interior. The first two issues were priced five cents, but most were probably given away for free, and the price disappeared from the cover with issue #3. Rather than a money-making venture, the magazine was intended to be a tool to lure children and their parents into "Official" Mickey Mouse stores, and movie theaters that promoted Disney cartoons. Nine issues were published between January and September 1933.

Mickey Mouse and Minnie Mouse appeared on the cover, sometimes accompanied by the dog Pluto and their friends Horace Horsecollar and Clarabelle Cow. The first issue's cover was drawn by Kamen staff artist John Stanley.

The first issue begins with an editor's message "written" by Mickey: "I am Mickey. I put my picture on this page so that you will know what I look like the next time you see me at the movies. I am the one with the little shoes and mouth-um-um-um-um; um-um-um-um."

In the first issue, Mickey introduces "the Official Mickey Mouse Password", which was: Spingle Bell! Chicko! This "password" was used throughout the magazine's run. To mark a noteworthy event – the doing of a good deed, or a new product line – the letter "K" was added to the end of the password. For example, an advertisement on the back cover of the first issue announces, "Minnie Mouse Says: These cute wool jerseys are 'Spingle-Bell Chicko-K'". To promote the password, a pinback button was given away at stores and theaters adorned with the picture of Mickey Mouse and the words "Spingle-Bell-Chicko-K".

There are five pages in the first issue that are essentially a spot illustration of Mickey Mouse, and a string of nonsense text: the introduction, the following page where Mickey throws a punch at a framed photograph of Walt Disney, and three pages headlined "Sneezes and Cheeses", "All About What!" and "Where All About It!" There are two pages with short comic strips – one about Minnie asking Mickey to sing a song, and another about Mickey, a porcupine and an apple tree. There is a two-page text story by Minnie about her adventures skiing, with illustrations of her and Horace on skis, and a two-page story by "Ruffles" about cats and the moon. The first issue was reprinted in its entirety in February 1996 in Walt Disney's Comics and Stories #601.

== 2nd series (1933–1935) ==
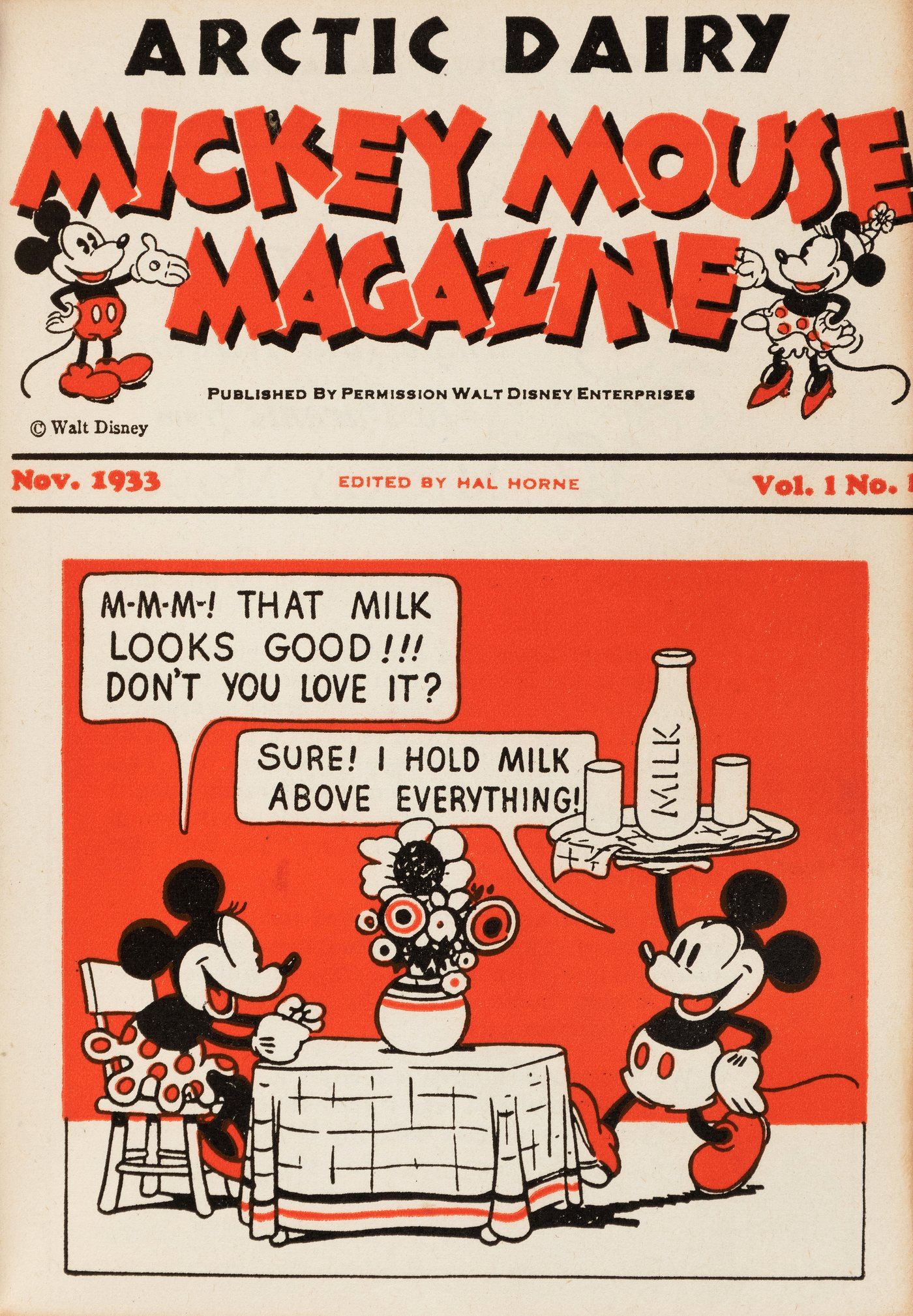
Cover for Mickey Mouse Magazine (2nd series) #1, in September 1933; the milk-related gag is typical of the series.

The first version of Mickey Mouse Magazine ceased publication with the September 1933 issue, and two months later, the second version launched in November 1933 as a promotion for dairies. The new series looked very much the same as the previous magazine, but had the name of a local dairy printed on the cover, and vigorously promoted the benefits of milk consumption. The magazine was distributed door-to-door by milk delivery drivers. 24 issues were published between November 1933 and October 1935.

The magazine was edited by Hal Horne, director of advertising and publicity for movie company United Artists, who began distributing Disney cartoons in 1932.

One of the key assets that Horne brought to the publication was the massive "gag file" – millions of jokes written on 3x5 cards – that he had been collecting for many years as a newspaperman, head of publicity of the Boy Scouts, film director and radio scriptwriter. In 1931, he began to file and cross-reference his collection, and by 1935, he had a staff to copy down and categorize jokes culled from magazines. He was reported to have the largest collection of jokes in the world. A 1936 newspaper article reported: "Horne's office, in a Fifth Avenue skyscraper, is probably the world's largest commercial gag factory. 6,000,000 jokes are housed in steel cabinets, all neatly filed, cross-filed and counter cross-filed. His storerooms are piled with magazines containing the earliest known printing of many of these jokes... Horne's clients are comic strip artists, stage, screen and radio comedians, playwrights, columnists, governors, senators, house organs and advertising agencies."

Horne's gag file gave the writers and artists of Mickey Mouse Magazine a trove of jokes to use. Unfortunately, that kind of material was only useful for short cartoon panels, and the comic pages in the magazine tended to be collections of puns and single exchanges, rather than stories. The ever-present dairy theme was also a limiting factor on the quality of the content.

On the plus side, this series of Mickey Mouse Magazine kept up with the evolving cast of Disney characters as they were developing in the cartoons and the Mickey Mouse and Silly Symphony comic strips. There were occasional one-page illustrated features telling the story of a contemporary Disney short, starting with the December 1933 adaptation of Mickey's The Steeple Chase. Donald Duck made an early appearance in a comic panel in the November 1934 issue, just a couple months after his first comics appearance in the Silly Symphony comic's adaptation of The Wise Little Hen. In the panel, Donald in his sailor suit leads a crowd of ducks, saying, "Quack! Quack! Drink lots of milk, Mickey! Quack! Quack!" Mickey, staring fixedly at a full glass of milk, says, "Now, that's what I call a wise quack!" Donald appeared on the cover for the first time in the March 1935 issue.

In addition, a 1934 issue of Mickey Mouse Magazine may have been the first licensed Disney product to use the name "Goofy" (initially, "Goofie") instead of the character's original name, Dippy Dawg.

That being said, the focus on milk was relentless. Comics historian Daniel F. Yezbick writes,

"Many issues enjoyed seasonal or holiday themes including Mickey and his gang drinking milk with Santa Claus or New Year's resolutions to 'Drink four glasses of milk every day.' Poetic tributes to dairy culture were also prevalent as in the December 1934 Christmas edition, wherein Mickey declares, 'The Milkman is like Santa, / He also brings you cheer. / But Santa comes on Christmas Eve / And the Milkman comes all year!'"

The recurring feature "Gallery of Hollywood stars who Drink Milk" included caricatures of celebrities like Claudette Colbert, Clark Gable, Jack Dempsey, and Babe Ruth.

== 3rd series (1935–1940) ==
=== Hal Horne (1935–1936) ===
Early in 1935, Horne talked to Kamen about publishing a magazine, which would be sold on newsstands. Horne would be the editor and publisher of the new magazine, and he resigned from United Artists to devote himself full-time to his publishing company, Hal Horne Inc.

This magazine, the third and final incarnation of Mickey Mouse Magazine, was a full-scale periodical, which debuted in summer 1935. (The magazine was dated "June-August 1935", and billed itself as a "summer quarterly".) The 44-page magazine was slightly larger than was usual at the time – 13¼ inches by 10¼ – and was priced at 25 cents. The new magazine had a full-color cover, and an interior color centerfold.

The first issue contained four two-page comic stories, Now for School and Barnum and Gaily's Side Show featuring Mickey, The Fun Book Frolics with Mickey and Horace, and Pluto the Pup's Barkin' Counter with Pluto. There were also several 3-page text stories ("Mickey and the Corn Storks", "Treasure Smile-land" and "Lost By a Hare", a retelling of the Silly Symphony short The Tortoise and the Hare) and 2-page text stories ("Professor Goof's Useful Inventions", "Mickey Mouse in Blunderland" and "Over the Mickeyphone"). The contents also included several joke and riddle pages, a coloring page, a dot-to-dot puzzle, a crossword puzzle, a "Let's Draw Minnie!" page, and a "Horacescope".

Comics historian Michael Barrier says that the magazine's content was poor quality from the start: "Although the Mickey Mouse Magazine, first under Horne and then under Kamen, generally resembled an established children's magazine like St. Nicholas, with a mixture of short stories, poems, puzzles, and drawings, the level of inspiration was low. The drawings, including those of the Disney characters, were often weak and even amateurish, the jokes lame, the stories pedestrian."

Horne was very enthusiastic about his new magazine's prospects for success, as he wrote to Roy O. Disney in May 1935:

"Last week both Kay and I addressed two important gatherings. The first was a convention of the supervisors of the Interboro News Company – hundreds of men who supervise the trucks that sell to newsstands. This gathering turned into a tremendous clamor for more copies, all of them complaining that their respective allotments, based on 200,000-circulation, would hardly do. The same thing happened at the following convention of the heads of wholesale news companies, who came in from all over the East. They too maintained that 200,000 would hardly be sufficient for national sale and as a result of both these appeals I took a chance and ordered an additional run of 100,000, making the print order for 300,000 in all."

Adding to the print order turned out to be a mistake; Horne distributed 294,000 copies, but only 148,000 were sold.

The magazine became a monthly with issue #2, which was published in October 1935. For the second issue, the price dropped from 25 cents to 10 cents. The dimensions also shrank from 13¼ x 10¼ to a more typical 11½ x 8½. Horne remained optimistic, writing to Roy Disney in October 1935, "The actual net sales on the twenty-five-cent issue is, at this time, 150,000. On the second issue (October), they expect 200,000 net. The print order for November is 300,000." Horne's actual print order for #2 and #3 were 300,000 each; they respectively sold 124,000 and 135,000. Starting with issue #4, Horne started to reduce the print order to the low 200,000s, but the sales continued to fall gently into the low 100,000s.

=== Kay Kamen (1936–1937) ===
By mid 1936, Horne was in financial difficulties, and asked Kamen to buy him out. Kamen reluctantly agreed, and Horne returned to the motion picture industry. Kamen sold a large number of excess copies of the early issues to foreign countries, which made the magazine profitable. In August 1936, Horne sold his gag file to Walt Disney for $20,000, which helped to recoup some of Horne's losses. Barrier reports:

"Dorothy Ann Blank, who had been working for Horne, moved over to the Disney studio to help the Disney writers use the gag file. The gags, in dozens of categories bearing such titles as “Absent Minded,” “Dumb Dames,” and “Laziness,” seem to have been received by the Disney writers with a predictable lack of enthusiasm, even after Horne gave them a pep talk in November 1936."

Kamen's run of the magazine began with issue #10 (July 1936), under the company name "Kay Kamen Ltd". The artists who contributed to the magazine were from Kamen's staff, including John Stanley (who later became well known for his work on the Little Lulu comic book starting in 1948), and Otto Messmer (well known for his creation of Felix the Cat). The magazine printed some non-Disney material, including Messmer's strip Bobby and Chip, which ran from 1936 to 1938, and Benny Bug, which appeared in the magazine in 1936.

As 1937 approached, Kamen made changes to the magazine to boost sales as the market started to shift to comic books rather than children's magazines. On issue #15 (Dec 1936) and #16 (Jan 1937), he added two words to the masthead, and the title appeared as "Mickey Mouse in a Magazine". Starting with issue #16, the cover also bore the words "with COMICS", and Kamen finally introduced reprints of the Disney comic strips to the magazine; reformatted Sunday pages from Ted Osborne and Floyd Gottfredson's Mickey Mouse were introduced in issue #16, and Osborne and Al Taliaferro's Silly Symphony Sunday pages in issue #17 (Feb 1937). The "with COMICS" subheadline continued to appear on the cover up to issue #24 (Sept 1937). Most of the covers from 1937 to 1940 were provided by Disney Publicity Art Department staffers Tom Wood and Hank Porter.

=== Western Publishing (1937–1940) ===
In 1937, Kamen went into partnership with Edward Wadewitz, founder of Western Printing and Lithographing Company. Western had been producing the popular Big Little Books series since 1933, which featured many Mickey Mouse and Donald Duck titles, and Wadewitz understood the characters' appeal. They formed the new imprint "K.K. Publications," which was owned 60% by Kay Kamen Ltd., and 40% by Wadewitz. Issue #21 (June 1937) was the first published under the new imprint; this was also the first issue to have half of the pages printed in color. By this point the circulation was around 45,000 copies a month.

The new collaboration brought an influx of Western-produced non-Disney content to the magazine, including adventure strips Roy Ranger, Ted True and the long-running Peter the Farm Detective.

The new regime also brought a new strategy, which was to promote the latest Walt Disney project on the cover. While the covers of the first 20 issues had featured the standard characters – Mickey, Minnie, Pluto, Donald and Goofy – issue #21 (June 1937) featured Elmer Elephant from the 1936 Silly Symphony short of the same name, issue #24 (Sept 1937) spotlighted the 1937 short Little Hiawatha, and issue #26 (Nov 1937) one of the Big Bad Wolf's little bad children, from the 1936 short Three Little Wolves.

Along the same lines, issue #27 (Dec 1937) began a four-part text/illustration adaptation of the upcoming feature film Snow White and the Seven Dwarfs, which went into wide release in February 1938. The Snow White characters appeared on the magazine's cover on issue #29 (Feb 1938) and #31 (April 1938), with Dopey appearing on his own on the cover of issue #33 (June 1938).

The magazine ran a similar promotion for Disney's 1940 Pinocchio feature, with a three-part adaptation beginning in issue #51 (Dec 1939). On that issue's cover, Mickey opens a door and welcomes Pinocchio, who waves hello to the readers. Pinocchio's friend Jiminy Cricket also appeared on the cover of issue #53 (Feb 1940). Other spotlighted cartoons included Brave Little Tailor (issue #37, Oct 1938), Ferdinand the Bull (#39, Dec 1938), The Practical Pig (#44, May 1939) and Donald's Penguin (#48, Sept 1939).

During the magazine's run, Donald Duck became increasingly popular, and his presence started to dominate the book. Silly Symphony Sunday strips featuring Donald were added to Mickey Mouse Magazine in issue #28 (Jan 1938). Comics historian Dennis Gifford says that as Donald's popularity grew, "Mickey's name was no longer the pulling power," and points out that the final four issues of Mickey Mouse Magazine only featured Donald on the cover.

=== Transition to comic book ===
Changes in the children's magazine market began to affect Mickey Mouse Magazine's format in its final year. In the late 1930s, American comic books grew in popularity, with April 1938's introduction of Superman in Action Comics #1 regarded as the beginning of the Golden Age of Comics. The story/activity/gag panel format of Mickey Mouse Magazine was increasingly seen as archaic.

The magazine tried to keep up, introducing the first serialized reprint of a Mickey Mouse daily continuity (Mighty Whale Hunter) beginning in issue #41 (Feb 1939). Still, Barrier says, "Converting Mickey Mouse Magazine to a comic book might have seemed like an obvious and appealing response [to the competition]. But by mid-1939, two years after reprinted Disney comic strips began appearing in the magazine, they had never established much more than a toehold, usually taking up only five pages. Despite the occasional ballyhooing of the comic strips on the cover of the magazine, there was always the sense that its editors begrudged the pages given to them."

Issue #48 (Sept 1939) was the first issue to be published in full color, but the number of comics pages still remained the same, with the non-Disney text feature Peter the Farm Detective still in evidence up until at least issue #54 (March 1940). In issue #57 (June 1940), the magazine shrank to the traditional comic book size.

The final issue, #60 (Sept 1940), is seen as a "transition issue", in which the magazine became a full-fledged comic book, just in time for a reboot. The size doubled to 64 pages, the usual size of a comic book at the time, including 34 pages of comic strip reprints.

=== Walt Disney's Comics and Stories ===
Starting with the October 1940 issue, the magazine was renamed Walt Disney's Comics and Stories, and started over with a new numbering system. The new title was suggested by Eleanor Packer, managing editor at Western's West Coast office. The publisher was still K.K. Publications, but by this time Western was the sole owner of the imprint. Western printed the magazine, and Dell Publishing (which had formed a partnership with Western in 1938) handled the management and distribution.

The new Walt Disney's Comics and Stories was 64 pages; in the first issue, 45 pages were reprints of Donald Duck and Mickey Mouse comic strips. The comic did still include a few pages of riddles, poems and a crossword puzzle, as well as three text adaptations of Disney shorts, but the era of the children's magazine was decidedly over.

In October 1940, the first issue of Walt Disney's Comics and Stories sold 252,000 copies, and within a few months, the comic began to increase its print runs by 100,000 or more each month. By issue #23 (Aug 1942), the comic was printing 1 million copies per issue. They reached 2 million copies by issue #66 (March 1946) and 3 million by issue #131 (August 1951). The magazine hit its peak circulation at 3,115,000 copies of issue #144 (September 1952), and is regarded as one of the best-selling comic books of all time.

== See also ==
- Disney comics
- Disney comics titles in the USA:
  - Mickey Mouse Magazine (1935–1940)
  - Walt Disney's Comics and Stories (1940–2020)
  - Donald Duck (1942–2017)
  - Mickey Mouse (1943–2017)
  - Uncle Scrooge (1952–2020)
  - Walt Disney Comics Digest (1968–1976)
  - Uncle Scrooge Adventures (1987–1997)
  - Mickey Mouse Adventures (1990–1991)
  - Donald Duck Adventures (1988–1998)
  - Walt Disney Giant (1995–1996)
