= Mickey Mouse Adventures =

1990-1991 Disney comic book

- Cover of Mickey Mouse Adventures #1 (June 1990)

Publication information
- Publisher: Disney Comics, Gemstone Publishing
- Format: Ongoing series
- Publication date: 1990–1991, 2004–2006
- Main character: Mickey Mouse

Mickey Mouse Adventures is a Disney comic book first published by Disney Comics from 1990 to 1991. It featured Mickey Mouse as the main character along with other characters from the Mickey Mouse universe. Somewhat similar in style to the animated series DuckTales, it was based on the continuity of earlier print material starring Mickey, mainly Floyd Gottfredson's stories in the Mickey Mouse comic strip.

These stories usually featured Mickey, with the help of longtime friends Goofy, Donald Duck, Pluto, Minnie Mouse, Horace Horsecollar, and Clarabelle Cow, having adventures in or out of Mouseton against adversaries such as The Phantom Blot, Big Bad Pete, Emil Eagle, and even newcomer villains like Wiley Wildbeest, Ms. Vixen, and Prince Penguin. The main feature was written by contemporary writers such as Michael T. Gilbert, Marv Wolfman, and others. The back-up features were reprints of classic Mickey Mouse comic stories. The comic ran for 18 issues from April 1990 to September 1991.

From August 2004 to October 2006, Gemstone Publishing published a smaller, digest-sized series of Mickey Mouse Adventures, alongside Donald Duck Adventures. The bi-monthly book was 128 pages and usually contained three or more longer stories that featured Mickey and various other Disney characters. The issue numbering of the original Disney Comics series was ignored, the digests being numbered issue 1 through 12 (issues 13 and 14 were announced, but cancelled).

Mickey Mouse Adventures was the only comic book that was originally published by Disney Comics that was published again by Gemstone but was never published by Gladstone.

== See also ==
- Disney comics
- Disney comics titles in the USA:
  - Mickey Mouse Magazine (1935–1940)
  - Walt Disney's Comics and Stories (1940–2020)
  - Donald Duck (1942–2017)
  - Mickey Mouse (1943–2017)
  - Uncle Scrooge (1952–2020)
  - Walt Disney Comics Digest (1968–1976)
  - Uncle Scrooge Adventures (1987–1997)
  - Mickey Mouse Adventures (1990–1991)
  - Donald Duck Adventures (1988–1998)
  - Walt Disney Giant (1995–1996)
