= Donald Duck Adventures =

Disney comic book series

Walt Disney's Donald Duck Adventures
- Cover to Gladstone Publishing's Donald Duck Adventures #1. November 1987. Cover by Daan Jippes.

Publication information
- Publisher: Gladstone Publishing, Disney Comics, Gemstone Publishing
- Schedule: monthly
- Publication date: November 1987–April 1990, August 1993-February 1998
- No. of issues: 48

Creative team
- Written by: Carl Barks, Byron Erickson, Geoffrey Blum, Bob Foster, Homer Brightman, Bob Karp
- Penciller(s): Carl Barks, Ben Verhagen, Frank Smith, Al Taliaferro, Don Rosa
- Inker(s): Carl Barks, Ben Verhagen, Al Taliaferro
- Colorist(s): Susan Daigle, Frank Smith

Donald Duck Adventures is a 1987–1998 Disney comic book series featuring the adventures of Donald Duck and his nephews Huey, Dewey and Louie.

== Publication history ==
=== Gladstone I: 1987–90 and Gladstone II: 1993–98 ===
Gladstone Publishing published 48 issues. The first 20 were published from 1987 to 1990 (#1-#20), and then the last 28 were published from 1993 to early 1998 (#21-#48), whereas Gladstone II continued the numbering of Gladstone I, ignoring the intermediate numbering of Disney Comics. The series contained original material alongside reprints from older Donald Duck strips from the 1930s and 1940s, as well as more modern material from the King syndicated strip from the 1980s.

=== Disney Comics: 1990–93 ===
Disney Comics published the title from 1990 to 1993, this one being the only one of the "new" Disney comic books to survive the company's comic implosion in 1991. They started a new numbering, issues #1-38.

=== Gemstone: 2003–06 ===
Gemstone Publishing published its own series of Donald Duck Adventures, this one as a digest size graphic novel alongside Mickey Mouse Adventures. These 128-page comics were sized 5" × 7½", and started a new numbering yet again, #1-#21. This Donald Duck Adventures was canceled in December 2006.

== Tamers of Nonhuman Threats ==
Tamers of Nonhuman Threats (TNT for short) is a continuing storyline in Walt Disney's Donald Duck comic books. The storyline began when Fethry Duck was enlisted in the secret international organization, whose purpose it is to find and counter paranormal threats to humanity before the public finds out about them and panics. Because of Fethry's general eagerness to involve Donald in his every interest, Donald involuntarily learned of the organisation and was enlisted too.

=== Characters ===
- The Head: A large dark-skinned man who leads the organisation with an effective leadership style.
- Katrina Kolik: A rough and tough female agent who functions as Donald's and Fethry's frequent supervisor. She believes in serious-minded, traditional secret agent behavior, and Donald's and Fethry's unorthodox methods often get on her nerves.
- Snort: A small, blue space alien with a long snout. He is the organisation's alien expert and also participates in training new agents. He speaks only in a strange grunting language which some other characters understand, but Donald and Fethry do not.
- Jackson and Finch: Two moderately experienced agents who enlisted Donald and Fethry and later became somewhat jealous of them.
- Boysenberry: A female mechanic, at least once enlisted as a saboteur.

Enemies Donald and Fethry have faced on their TNT missions include a strange blue jelly-like organism that grew everywhere (Blue Rain), a shapeshifting alien pirate (Gilor Borax), a horde of ghost rats killed by the Pied Piper, and a kingdom of demon-like monsters, led by monster king Molok Mak, who were about to break loose from their underground habitat.

The TNT pays their agents well for each mission but demands that the organisation be kept in total secrecy. When Donald groused that he was not paid by a German town for eliminating their ghosts, the Head reminds Donald that he was under cover and that any payment would have gone to TNT. TNT also does nonconfrontational work, such as cleaning up a gigantic mess of skunk oil that Donald created in Duckburg, while he was on a mission.

=== Publication history ===
The TNT series was created by Lars Jensen (writer), Flemming Andersen (artist), and David Gerstein (editor/co-writer) for Egmont Creative A/S (Denmark), and Egmont's European affiliate publishers have generally published the full TNT series in local editions. Non-Egmont European publishers have thus far generally published most, but not all, of the stories. North America's Gemstone Publishing published the first five, with IDW Publishing more recently publishing the second five.

In 2014, Lars Jensen ceased to be the series' main writer. The series was largely taken over by writers Byron Erickson (six TNT stories) and Maya Åstrup (three TNT stories), though Jensen would later return to write more chapters (2021 onward).

== See also ==
- Disney comics
- Disney comics titles in the USA:
  - Mickey Mouse Magazine (1935-1940)
  - Walt Disney's Comics and Stories (1940–2020)
  - Donald Duck (1942-2017)
  - Mickey Mouse (1943-2017)
  - Uncle Scrooge (1952–2020)
  - Walt Disney Comics Digest (1968-1976)
  - Uncle Scrooge Adventures (1987-1997)
  - Mickey Mouse Adventures (1990-1991)
  - Donald Duck Adventures (1988-1998)
  - Walt Disney Giant (1995-1996)
