= Mickey Mouse and Friends =

Mickey Mouse and Friends may refer to:

- Mickey Mouse universe, a fictional shared universe featuring the Disney character Mickey Mouse and related characters
- Mickey Mouse (comic book), a comic book series titled Mickey Mouse and Friends from issues #257–303
