= Timeless Tales =

Timeless Tales may refer to:

- Timeless Tales (Disney comics), a 2016–18 hardcover book collection series
- Timeless Tales (For Changing Times), a 1998 album byJoshua Redman
- Timeless Tales from Hallmark, an American live-action/animated direct-to-video series
