= Disney's Comics in 3-D =

Disney's Comics in 3-D was a two-part comic book series published by Disney Comics in 1992.

Unlike most comic books, the stories are drawn in 3-D stereo. The first issue had Mickey Mouse, Donald Duck, Uncle Scrooge, and Duck Tales, and the second issue had all Roger Rabbit stories.

== List of stories ==
=== Issue 1 ===
- Donald Duck in Knights of the Flying Sleds by Carl Barks (Reprinted from Walt Disney's Comics and Stories #223)
- Duck Tales in The Billion Bean Stampede by William Van Horn (Reprinted from Duck Tales #13 "The Gladstone Series")
- Mickey Mouse center spread by Floyd Gottfredson (Reprinted from King Features Syndicate on April 30, 1933)
- Uncle Scrooge in The Curse of Nostrildamus by Don Rosa (Reprinted from Uncle Scrooge #235)
- Donald Duck in Rocket Wing Saves the Day by Carl Barks (Reprinted from Walt Disney's Comics and Stories #139)

=== Issue 2 ===
- Roger Rabbit in Gym Dandy (Reprinted from Roger Rabbit #2)
- Roger Rabbit in The Candy Cane Mutiny (Reprinted from Roger Rabbit #6)
- Roger Rabbit in Movin to the Music (Reprinted from Roger Rabbit #11)
- Roger Rabbit in Cotton Tailspin (Reprinted from Roger Rabbit #4)

3-D comics were later used for issues of Disney Adventures Magazine which were used in the early to mid-1990s.
