= Walt Disney's Comics and Stories =

Anthology comic book series featuring Disney characters

- Cover of No. 126, by Dell Comics

Publication information
- Publisher: Dell Comics; Gold Key Comics; Disney Comics; Gladstone Publishing; Gemstone Publishing; Boom! Kids (Boom! Studios); IDW Publishing
- Format: Ongoing series
- Publication date: 1940 – 2020

Walt Disney's Comics and Stories, sometimes abbreviated WDC&S, is an American anthology comic book series featuring characters from The Walt Disney Company's films and shorts, including Donald Duck, Scrooge McDuck, Mickey Mouse, Chip 'n' Dale, Li'l Bad Wolf, Scamp, Bucky Bug, Grandma Duck, Brer Rabbit, Winnie the Pooh, and others. With more than 700 issues, Walt Disney's Comics & Stories is the longest-running Disney comic book in the United States, making it the flagship title, and is one of the best-selling comic books of all time.

The book was originally published by Dell Comics (1940–1962), and there have been many revivals over the years, continuing the same legacy numbering. The revivals have been published by Gold Key Comics (1962–1984), Gladstone Publishing (1986–1990), Disney Comics (1990–1993), back to Gladstone Publishing (1993–1999), Gemstone Publishing (2003–2008), Boom! Studios (2009–2011) and IDW Publishing (2015–2020).

== Publication history ==
The precursor to WDC was Mickey Mouse Magazine, published in several incarnations from 1933 to 1940. WDC itself was launched in October 1940, and initially consisted of reprints taken from the Disney comic strips Mickey Mouse, Donald Duck, and Silly Symphonies, reformatted for comic books and colored. The first original story created for WDC was an adaptation of The Flying Gauchito, illustrated by Walt Kelly, in issue No. 24 (August 1942).

To facilitate birthday and holiday gift giving to youngsters, Western Publishing offered to send subscription recipients illustrated letters that announced the gift. Various premiums were also offered for new subscribers, including a mini-poster attributed to Pogo creator Walt Kelly advertised on the back cover of issue No. 100 (Jan. 1949). Walt Kelly would do the cover art for many issues between No. 34 and No. 118 and provided interior art for issues # 34–41 and 43.

The anthology format usually began with a 10-page story featuring Donald Duck and for most of the run ended with a serial or single story featuring Mickey Mouse. The most popular issues featured the Donald Duck 10-pagers written and drawn by Carl Barks, who began the run with issue No. 31 (April 1943) and ended with original stories in issue No. 312 (September 1966), but have been continually reprinted. Almost all of these stories co-starred Donald's nephews, Huey, Dewey, and Louie, with frequent guest appearances by Barks' most famous creation, Scrooge McDuck, as well as the Beagle Boys, Gyro Gearloose, and Gladstone Gander.

Many 1940s issues featured Mickey Mouse serials by Floyd Gottfredson which were reprinted from newspaper daily comic strips; later, Paul Murry took over drawing original Mickey Mouse serials, with stories written by Carl Fallberg and Don Christensen among others. The 1980s saw numerous Murry reprints; the 1990s and more recent times saw new Mickey Mouse stories by Noel Van Horn and (usually only drawn by) Cesar Ferioli, as well as some Gottfredson serials not previously anthologized in comic book format.

Li'l Bad Wolf stories began in issue No. 52 (January 1945) and remained a regular feature for more than ten years, continuing to appear in the majority of issues even after the continuous run stopped. Carl Buettner (1945–1946), Gil Turner (1948–1956), and Dick Matena (2005–2008) are generally regarded as the most notable Wolf creators featured in the title. In the 2000s, Big Bad Wolf often supplanted his son as title character of the stories.

Bucky Bug stories began in issue No. 20 (May 1942) with a series of newspaper reprints; original Bucky stories started a while later, in issue No. 39 (December 1943). Bucky stories were monthly through 1950, were not seen for several decades, then returned on an occasional basis from 1988 onwards, with a mixture of old and new material.

By the mid-1950s, Walt Disney's Comics and Stories was the best selling comic book in the United States, with a monthly circulation of over three million. Mark Evanier described the high circulation as the product of "an aggressive subscription push."

In many 1980s issues, as well as scattered issues from 2006 onward, new Donald Duck stories by Daan Jippes or Freddy Milton would lead off the title. Issues No. 523, 524, 526, 528, 531, and 547 (all 1987–1990) featured lead-off stories drawn (and usually written) by Don Rosa, while most issues published between 1993 and 2005 featured lead-offs by William Van Horn.

After reaching its 600th issue, the title converted to prestige format and remained that way until the end of Gemstone's run at issue No. 698.

In September 2009, with the publishing rights of the "core four" comics being moved to Boom! Studios, the comic was cut down to 24 pages per issue and began focusing on printing multi-part story arcs that would run for about four issues each, the first being the infamous Ultraheroes arc (which would be concluded in its own series that ran for eight issues). As with all of Boom!'s Disney comics, each issue had at least two different variant covers, though this was eventually stopped at issue No. 709. At the start of 2011, to celebrate the comic's 70th anniversary, Walt Disney's Comics and Stories returned to its original anthology format. However, due to The Incredibles comic book being cancelled on a cliffhanger the previous year, coupled with Disney having acquired Marvel Comics two years earlier, Disney opted not to renew their deal with Boom! Studios, forcing Boom! to abruptly end their run with the title at issue No. 720. It was later announced that their first issue of Walt Disney's Comics and Stories would be published on July 22, 2015. Similar to the Boom! issues, each of IDW's issues were published with at least two different variant covers, with at least one cover being based on Disney theme parks and attractions in the first year.

Under IDW, issue No. 726 featured the first appearance of Oswald the Lucky Rabbit in the series.

To make room for the inclusion of the localized Duck Avenger title in the line, Walt Disney's Comics and Stories switched to bimonthly publication in July 2016, alternating with Duck Avenger each month. Due to IDW's Disney line expanding to include Tangled and DuckTales in July 2017, Walt Disney's Comics and Stories switched to quarterly publication from that point onward. It switched back to monthly publication when its name was shortened to Disney Comics and Stories in September 2018.

Unlike the other three "core four" comics, Walt Disney's Comics and Stories retained its original numbering system when IDW launched its Disney line; however, when the book's title was shortened, IDW restarted the numbering system as if it were a new series, instead including the legacy numbering (#744–756) in the issues' indicia.

=== Publishing history ===
Publisher	Run	Issues published
Dell Comics	October 1940 – July 1962	#1–263
Gold Key Comics	August 1962–1984	#264–510
Gladstone Publishing	July 1986 – January 9, 1990	#511–547
Disney Comics	April 1990 – May 1993	#548–585
Gladstone Publishing	June 1993 – December 1998	#586–633
Gemstone Publishing	June 2003 – November 2008	#634–698
Boom! Studios	September 2009 – June 2011	#699–720
IDW Publishing	July 2015 – July 2020	#721–756

== Notable stories ==
The following is a list of notable stories that had their first American printings in an issue of Walt Disney's Comics and Stories.

Story	Writer	Artist	Issue(s) featured in	Notes
"The Flying Gauchito"	unknown	Walt Kelly	No. 24	First original comic story published in the title that is not a reprint of a newspaper comic strip. Adapted from The Three Caballeros segment of the same name.
"Private Pluto" (text story)	unknown	unknown	No. 25	First public appearance of Chip and Dale in any media, based on a cartoon that would not come out until the following year.
"The Carnival King"	unknown	Carl Buettner	No. 27	First story starring José Carioca in this title.
"The Victory Garden"	Carl Barks		No. 31	First Comics and Stories Donald Duck story drawn by Carl Barks.
"The Gremlins"	unknown	Veve Risto	No. 33	First appearance of Gremlin Gus in this title.
"Good Deeds"	Carl Barks		No. 34	First appearance of Neighbor Jones.
"A Cure for Gout"	Al Taliaferro		No. 39	First original Bucky Bug story in this title.
"Li'l Bad Wolf Traps His Dad"	Chase Craig	Carl Buettner	No. 52	First appearance of Li'l Bad Wolf.
"The Practical Pig"	Carl Buettner		No. 54	First teamup of Li'l Bad Wolf with the Three Little Pigs.
"Magical Misery"	Carl Barks		No. 82	
"The Waltz King"	Carl Barks		No. 84	
"Wintertime Wager"	Carl Barks		No. 88	First appearance of Gladstone Gander.
"Log Rollers"	unknown	Don Gunn	No. 89	First comic book story starring Chip and Dale (who had only appeared earlier in other characters' stories). Adapted from the cartoon short Chip an' Dale.
"Gladstone Returns"	Carl Barks		No. 95	
"Truant Officer Donald"	Carl Barks		No. 100	Loosely adapted from the cartoon short of the same name (which Carl Barks was notably also a co-writer for). Also titled "Champion Truant Officer".
"Mickey Mouse Outwits the Phantom Blot" (redrawn version)	Floyd Gottfredson and Merrill De Maris	Dick Moores and Bill Wright	No. 101-106	First full-length Mickey Mouse story drawn for this title, though the script was adapted from an existing newspaper strip story. First appearance of the Phantom Blot in this title.
"Pizen Spring Dude Ranch"	Carl Barks		No. 102	
"Operation St. Bernard"	Carl Barks		No. 125	First appearance of the Junior Woodchucks.
"A Financial Fable"	Carl Barks		No. 126	
"The Ghost of Man-Eater Mountain"	Don R. Christensen	Bill Wright	No. 129-132	First entirely original Mickey Mouse story drawn for this title.
"Terror of the Beagle Boys"	Carl Barks		No. 134	First appearance of the Beagle Boys.
"Gladstone's Terrible Secret"	Carl Barks		No. 140	First appearance of Gyro Gearloose.
"Flip Decision"	Carl Barks		No. 149	
"The Last Resort"	Carl Fallberg	Paul Murry	No. 152-154	First Mickey Mouse story by this famous creative team, who would produce dozens of additional Mickey serials for this title.
"Salmon Derby"	Carl Barks		No. 167	
"Search for the Cuspidoria"	Carl Barks		No. 172	
"Searching for a Successor"	Carl Barks		No. 187	
"Ting-A-Ling Trouble"	Vic Lockman	Phil DeLara	No. 308	First appearance of Newton Gearloose.
"The Talking Dog"	Werner Wejp-Olsen and Edele Kenner	Daniel Branca	No. 510	First story drawn by Branca to be published in North America.
"The Do-Gooders' League"	Daan Jippes		No. 511	First story by Jippes to be published in this title.
"The Success Test"	Daan Jippes and Freddy Milton		No. 512	First story by Milton to be published in this title.
"Mythological Menagerie"	Don Rosa		No. 523	First story by Rosa to be published in this title.
"Recalled Wreck"	Don Rosa		No. 524	
"Oolated Luck"	Don Rosa		No. 528	
"Magica's Missin' Magic"	William Van Horn		No. 591	Originally published in Anders And & Co. 1993-19 in Denmark.
"The Once and Future Duck"	Don Rosa		#607–609	Originally published in Anders And & Co. 1996-21, 22, and 23 in Denmark.
"A Matter of Some Gravity"	Don Rosa		No. 610	Originally published in Anders And & Co. 1996-32 in Denmark.
"An Eye for Detail"	Don Rosa		No. 622	Originally published in Anders And & Co. 1997-19 in Denmark.
"Checkmate"	Noel Van Horn		No. 634	Originally published in Anders And & Co. 2002–30.
"Spidermouse"	Carol and Pat McGreal	Francisco Rodriguez Peinado	No. 635	Originally published in Anders And & Co. 2003-03.
"The Three Caballeros Ride Again"	Don Rosa		#635–637	Originally published in Anders And & Co. 2000–40, 41, and 42 in Denmark.
"The Great Birthday Robbery!"	Byron Erickson	Cèsar Ferioli Pelaez	No. 638	Originally published in Kalle Anka & Co. #1998-46 in Denmark.
"Mythos Island"	Per Hedman (plot); Carol and Pat McGreal (script)	Cèsar Ferioli Pelaez	#657–661	Originally published as a 10-part story in Anders And & Co. 2003–24, 27, 30, 33, 36, 39, 41, 45, 48, and 49 in Denmark.
"The Magnificent Seven (Minus 4) Caballeros"	Don Rosa		#663–665	Originally published in Anders And & Co. 2005-03, 04, and 05 in Denmark.
"New Year's Nightmare"	Carol and Pat McGreal	Cèsar Ferioli Pelaez	No. 676	Originally published as a 2-part story in Anders And & Co. 1999-52 and 2000–01 in Denmark.
"70th Heaven"	Evert Geradts	Daan Jippes	No. 715	Originally published in Donald Duck 1992X43 in the Netherlands.
"The Treasure of Marco Topo" (Part 2)	Romano Scarpa		No. 720	Originally published in Topolino (libretto) #1474 in Italy. The first half of the story was printed in Mickey Mouse No. 309.
"The Search for the Zodiac Stone"	Bruno Sarda	Franco Valussi; Massimo De Vita	#721–732	Originally published in Topolino (libretto) #1780–1791 in Italy.
"Just Like Magic!"	David Gerstein	Mark Kausler	No. 726	Originally published in Walt Disney's Julehefte Julen 2011 in Norway. First Oswald the Lucky Rabbit story to be printed in Walt Disney's Comics and Stories.
"The Persistence of Mickey"	Roberto Gagnor	Giorgo Cavazzano	No. 734	Originally published in Topolino (libretto) #2861 in Italy. Was originally planned to appear in issue No. 720 before being shelved for the second half of "The Treasure of Marco Topo".

== Numbering ==
While the issues are now referred to with sequential numbers, the format for the first ten years of the comic was to use the volume and number. Each volume contained 12 issues thus issue No. 13 (October 1941) was labeled "Vol. 2 No. 1" and included several stories about superstitions, especially about the number 13. The title started using whole numbers with issue No. 124, in January 1951.

=== Publishers ===
The publishers of Walt Disney's Comics and Stories have been:

- Dell Comics (Oct 1940 – Aug 1962) #1–263
- Gold Key Comics (Sept 1962 – 1984) #264–510
- Gladstone Publishing (Oct 1986 – April 1990) #511–547
- Disney Comics (June 1990 – July 1993) #548–585
- Gladstone Publishing (Aug 1993 – Feb 1999) #586–633
- Gemstone Publishing (June 2003 – November 2008) #634–698
- Boom! Kids (Boom! Studios) (September 2009 – June 2011) #699–720
- IDW Publishing (July 2015–July 2020) #721–756

== Circulation ==
The first issue of Walt Disney's Comics and Stories sold 252,000 copies. By issue No. 23 (August 1942), the comic was printing 1,000,000 copies per issue. They reached 2 million copies by issue No. 66 (March 1946) and 3 million by issue No. 131 (August 1951). The magazine hit its peak at 3,115,000 copies of issue No. 144 (September 1952).

== Collections ==
Between 1984 and 1990, Another Rainbow Publishing collected all of Carl Barks's Disney comics as The Carl Barks Library. Gladstone Publishing released further reprints of Barks's stories in the 1990s.

In 2011, KaBOOM! published the first volume of an Archives series collecting issues from the beginning of the comic's run. In 2018, IDW released an anthology of its stories.

== See also ==
- Other Disney comics titles in the US:
  - Mickey Mouse Magazine (1935–1940)
  - Donald Duck (1942–2017)
  - Mickey Mouse (1943–2017)
  - Uncle Scrooge (1952–2020)
  - Walt Disney Comics Digest (1968–1976)
  - Uncle Scrooge Adventures (1987–1997)
  - Mickey Mouse Adventures (1990–1991)
  - Donald Duck Adventures (1988–1998)
  - Walt Disney Giant (1995–1996)
