= Uncle Scrooge =

Disney comic book series starring Scrooge McDuck

- Uncle Scrooge #21 cover. Art by Carl Barks.

Publication information
- Publisher: Dell Comics, Gold Key Comics / Whitman, Gladstone Publishing, Disney Comics, Gemstone Publishing, Boom! Kids, IDW Publishing, Fantagraphics
- Genre: Humor
- Publication date: 1952–1984; 1986–1998; 2003–2008; 2009–2011; 2015–2020; 2025-
- No. of issues: 460, including 3 issues of Four Color (as of September 2020)

Creative team
- Created by: Carl Barks, Tony Strobl, Vic Lockman, Phil DeLara, Jack Manning, Pete Alvarado, Daan Jippes, Don Rosa, William Van Horn, Gutenberghus/Egmont Group (Vicar, Daniel Branca, Joel Katz, Dave Angus, Tom Anderson, Gail Renard, et al.), John Lustig, Pat McGreal, Dave Rawson, Michael T. Gilbert, Romano Scarpa, and others

Uncle Scrooge (stylized as Uncle $crooge) is a Disney comic book series starring Scrooge McDuck ("the richest duck in the world"), his nephew Donald Duck, and grandnephews Huey, Dewey, and Louie, and revolving around their adventures in Duckburg and around the world. It was first published in Four Color Comics #386 (March 1952), as a spin-off of the popular Donald Duck series and is still ongoing. It has been produced under the aegis of several different publishers, including Western Publishing (initially in association with Dell Comics and later under its own subsidiary, Gold Key Comics and their Whitman imprint), Gladstone Publishing, Disney Comics, Gemstone Publishing, Boom! Studios, and IDW Publishing. The series has maintained the same numbering throughout its life, with IDW Publishing resetting the series to issue #1 alongside a secondary legacy numbering.

Besides Scrooge and his family, recurring characters include Gyro Gearloose, Gladstone Gander, Emily Quackfaster, and Brigitta MacBridge. Among the adversaries who make repeat appearances are the Beagle Boys, Magica De Spell, John D. Rockerduck and Flintheart Glomgold. Uncle Scrooge is one of the core titles of the "Duck universe".

Its early issues by famed writer/artist (and creator of Scrooge McDuck) Carl Barks inspired the syndicated television cartoon DuckTales in the late 1980s. Several stories written by Barks and published in Uncle Scrooge were adapted into DuckTales episodes.

== Writers and artists ==
The first 70 issues mostly consisted of stories written and drawn by Carl Barks. The 71st issue had a story written by Barks and drawn by Tony Strobl. Subsequent Gold Key Comics issues combined reprints of earlier Barks tales with new material by creators such as Strobl, Vic Lockman, Phil DeLara, Jack Manning, and Pete Alvarado.

When Gladstone Publishing relaunched the title in 1986, a new generation of American creators began contributing to the title, including Don Rosa, William Van Horn, John Lustig, Pat McGreal, Dave Rawson, and Michael T. Gilbert. As before, their work was intermingled with Carl Barks reprints, as well as with translations of European Disney comics by such creators as Daan Jippes, Fred Milton and Romano Scarpa originally published by Oberon, Egmont (originally Gutenberghus) and Disney Italy/Mondadori.

== U.S. publication history ==
- Dell Comics: 1952–1962 (Four Color Comics issues 386, 456 and 495; issues 4–39)
- Gold Key Comics: 1962–1984 (issues 40–173 as Gold Key, 174–209 as Whitman)
- Gladstone Publishing: 1986–1990 (issues 210–242)
- Disney Comics: 1990–1993 (issues 243–280)
- Gladstone Publishing: 1993–1998 (issues 281–318)
- Gemstone Publishing: 2003–2008 (issues 319–383)
- Boom! Kids (Boom! Studios): 2009–2011 (issues 384–404)
- IDW Publishing: 2015–2020 (IDW #1-56, with "legacy" issue numbers 405–460 in brackets)
- Fantagraphics: 2025- (Fantagraphics #1-, with "legacy" issue numbers 461- in brackets)

Scrooge made his first appearance in the Donald Duck story "Christmas on Bear Mountain" as a curmudgeonly man who decides to test Donald and his nephews to see if they are worthy of inheriting his wealth. Barks found the character and his wealth a useful springboard for stories and re-used him in a number of subsequent Donald Duck one-shot adventures and ten pagers appearing in Walt Disney's Comics and Stories. By 1952 the popularity of the character convinced Dell to give Scrooge a try-out as a lead character in the seminal "Only a Poor Old Man" in Dell's Four Color anthology series, a story Barks expert Michael Barrier has termed a masterpiece. After two further Four Color appearances Scrooge was granted his own title starting with issue number 4 (counting the try-out issues as one through three).

The series continued uninterrupted (though not always on a monthly schedule) until 1984, when Western Publishing (the parent company of Gold Key/Whitman, who were publishing the title at the time) withdrew from the comic book business. Western had held the Disney comic book license since the late 1930s, and their withdrawal left the license, and Uncle Scrooge, in limbo for two years, when Another Rainbow, who had been publishing hardbound compilations of Carl Barks's work for several years, acquired it and launched Gladstone Publishing, resuming the title where Whitman had left off.

Gladstone continued publishing Uncle Scrooge until their license expired in 1990. At that point, the series shifted over to Disney Comics with little change in editorial direction. It was one of only three monthly titles to survive the "Disney implosion" of 1991 (the others being Walt Disney's Comics and Stories and Donald Duck Adventures), and continued to be published by Disney Comics until 1993, when Disney Comics folded and the license was reacquired by Gladstone Publishing. Gladstone went through their own implosion in 1998, and Uncle Scrooge was briefly converted into a double-sized (64 page), "prestige" format series, before Gladstone ended publication entirely later that year.

No further issues were published until 2003, when Gemstone Publishing (whose editorial staff included several former employees of Gladstone) acquired the license and resumed publication of Uncle Scrooge. Gemstone maintained the prestige format previously adopted by Gladstone, and continued to publish the series until November 2008. Financial difficulties at Gemstone ended its run then, and the license was acquired by Boom! Studios, who reverted to the standard 32 page format when they began publication in late 2009. Boom's run ended in 2011, when the Walt Disney Company's acquisition of Marvel Entertainment lead to the consolidation of all Disney comics licenses under Marvel Comics.

In January 2015, IDW Publishing announced that they would be publishing the title, starting in April 2015. Apart from the single issues of the comic book, IDW Publishing also publishes the run in trade paperback collections compiling three issues each, but did also at one point collect the issues in hardcover collections under the title Uncle Scrooge: Timeless Tales. However the hardcover compilations ceased to come out after the third volume. The Trade paperbacks soon followed, and IDW would cease publishing the comic after issue 460 (IDW 56), leaving the series ending on a cliffhanger as the story was to be continued in the next issue.

In July 2025, Fantagraphics, who had been publishing archival Disney material since 2011, announced they would be publishing Uncle Scrooge monthly starting in October 2025.

=== Other titles and spinoffs ===
Over the years, Scrooge McDuck has proven popular enough to appear as the main character in a number of other comic book series. Many of these series include republications of stories originally written for the "main" Uncle Scrooge title in the United States or various European countries.

Scrooge often appeared in The Beagle Boys alongside his frequent adversaries, published irregularly by Gold Key from 1963 to 1979. When that title ended, it was relaunched as The Beagle Boys Versus Uncle Scrooge in March 1979 and lasted for twelve issues, until February 1980.

In 1987, Gladstone Publishing began publication of Uncle Scrooge Adventures, which they would continue to publish until 1998, excluding the period from 1990 through 1993, when Disney Comics held the license to publish Disney comics.

Scrooge was also a major character in three different comic book titles tied in with the DuckTales television series. The first of these consisted of 13 issues and was published by Gladstone Publishing from 1987 to 1990. The second consisted of 18 issues published by Disney Comics from 1990 through 1991. The final (to date) was published over six issues by Boom! Kids in 2011. Several DuckTales comics starring Scrooge would also appear in the pages of Disney Adventures in the early 1990s.

Finally, The Adventurous Uncle Scrooge McDuck, published by Gladstone, ran for two issues in 1998. A third issue was planned but cancelled along with the rest of Gladstone's output other than Uncle Scrooge and Walt Disney's Comics and Stories following a collapse in comics sales.

== Reprints ==
Carl Bark's Greatest DuckTales Stories (printed in the order of adaptation into Ducktales episodes).
Volume 1	Four Color #456; Uncle Scrooge #13, 65, 9, 14 & 29
Volume 2	Uncle Scrooge #58, 12, 3, 41, 38 & 6

The Complete Carl Barks Disney Library.
Volume 1 (Volume 12 overall) "Only a Poor Old Man"	Four Color #386, 456, 495; Uncle Scrooge #4–6
Volume 2 (Volume 14 overall) “The Seven Cities of Gold”	TBA
Volume 3 (Volume 16 overall) “The Lost Crown of Genghis Khan”	TBA

Walt Disney's Uncle Scrooge (Fantagraphics)
The Diamond Jubilee Collection	TBA

== See also ==
- Disney comics
- Disney comics titles in the USA:
  - Mickey Mouse Magazine (1935–1940)
  - Walt Disney's Comics and Stories (1940–2020)
  - Donald Duck (1942–)
  - Mickey Mouse (1943–)
  - Uncle Scrooge (1952–)
  - Walt Disney Comics Digest (1968–1976)
  - Uncle Scrooge Adventures (1987–1997)
  - Mickey Mouse Adventures (1990–1991)
  - Donald Duck Adventures (1988–1998)
  - Walt Disney Giant (1995–1996)
- DuckTales (1987 TV series), based on the comic book
  - DuckTales (2017 TV series), a reboot
