= Uncle Scrooge Adventures =

Walt Disney's Uncle Scrooge Adventures

Publication information
- Publisher: Gladstone Publishing
- Publication date: November 1987 – March 1998
- No. of issues: 54
- Main character(s): Uncle Scrooge; Donald Duck; Huey, Dewey and Louie

Uncle Scrooge Adventures is a 1987–1997 Disney comic book series published by Gladstone Publishing under license from the Walt Disney Company. It features the adventures of Scrooge McDuck and his nephews Donald, Huey, Dewey, and Louie. It was usually distinguished from the main Uncle Scrooge title in its focus on longer, full-length stories, often in the pulp adventure style.

The first series ran for 21 issues from 1987 to 1990, when Gladstone Publishing's license with the Walt Disney Company ceased. Disney Comics chose not to continue the series from 1990 through 1993. When Gladstone renewed their license in 1993, they resumed the series, picking up with issue 22. The series continued until 1997, when it fell victim to the "Gladstone implosion" and ceased publication following issue 54. The series was not subsequently revived by either Gemstone Publishing (who held the Disney comics license from 2003 through 2008) or Boom! Studios (who held it from 2009 through 2011).

The story Horsing Around with History in issue 33 of the second series won the Comics Buyer's Guide Fan Award for Favorite Comic-Book Story for 1996.

== Original title ==
Original cover art for issue #1, as published in the November 1987 edition of the Cross Talk column previewing Gladstone's forthcoming titles

The series was initially intended to launch in 1987 as a tie-in to the forthcoming DuckTales television series. The focus was to be on the works of Carl Barks and other Disney comics creators that inspired the series, not necessarily original works produced in response to the series. Shortly before publication of the first issue, however, Gladstone Publishing and the Walt Disney Company decided to drop the DuckTales name and re-brand the series Uncle Scrooge Adventures, in the same format as its intended sister title, Donald Duck Adventures.

Because of the last minute of the nature of the change, however, promotional articles using the DuckTales title could not be altered, even in the first issue of Uncle Scrooge Adventures itself. Gladstone would eventually publish a thirteen issue DuckTales series of their own from 1988 through 1990, featuring a mixture of classic Uncle Scrooge stories and newly commissioned television tie-ins.

== Censorship ==
The Treasure Temple of Khaos, featured in issue 35, was censored in the United States due to several depictions of nudity (Uncle Scrooge used Huey and Dewey's sweatshirts as torches in an Egyptian pyramid and soon uses his own coat as a torch), replacing it with undershirts, although the nakedness is uncensored in most other countries.

== List of issues ==
=== Series 1 (1987–1990) ===
- 1. McDuck of Arabia (Carl Barks)
- 2. Trail of the Polka Dot Parrot (Branca)
- 3. Bongo on the Congo (Barks)
- 4. The Golden River (Barks)
- 5. The Last Sled to Dawson (Rosa)
- 6. The Oddball Odyessey (Barks)
- 7. The 12th Caesarius (Branca)
- 8. So Far and No Safari (Barks)
- 9. Ill Met by Moonlight (Branca)
- 10. The Land of the Pygmy Indians (Barks)
- 11. Crown of the Mayas (Barks)
- 12. The Log of the Nancy Bell (Gutenberghus)
- 13. The Twenty Four Carat Moon (Barks)
- 14. His Majesty McDuck (Rosa)
- 15. The Micro Ducks from Outer Space (Barks)
- 16. The Billion Dollar Safari (Barks)
- 17. Lost Beneath the Sea (Barks)
- 18. That's No Fable (Barks)
- 19. A Stitch in Time (Branca)
- 20. The Paul Bunyan Machine (Barks)
- 21. The Mystery of the Ghosttown Railroad (Barks)

=== Series 2 (1993–1997) ===
- 22. The Prize of Pizarro (Barks)
- 23. Uncle Scrooge Meets The Phantom Blot (Murry)
- 24. The Little Gronins (Vicar)
- 25. The Money Well (Barks)
- 26. Back to the Klondike (Barks)
- 27. Guardians of the Lost Library (Rosa)
- 28. Land Beneath the Ground (Barks) and The Man from Oola Oola Part 1 (Scarpa)
- 29. The Man from Oola Oola Part 2 (Scarpa)
- 30. The Golden Fleecing and The Lentils from Babylon Part 1 (Barks - Scarpa)
- 31. The Lentils from Babylon Part 2 (Scarpa)
- 32. The Lentils from Babylon Part 3 (Scarpa)
- 33. Horsing Around with History and Only a Poor Old Man (Van Horn/Barks - Barks)
- 34. The Money Counting Machine and Beagle Bug-off (Branca - Lockman)
- 35. The Treasure Temple of Khaos (Verhagen)
- 36. The Diamond of Duncan McDuck (Verhagen)
- 37. The Colossus of the Nile Part 1 (Scarpa)
- 38. The Colossus of the Nile Part 2 (Scarpa)
- 39. Tralla La (Barks)
- 40. The Rarest Dog in the World and The Hi-Tech, Low-Down Blues (Vicar - Branca)
- 41. The Starkos Statue (Vicar)
- 42. The Treasure of Marco Polo (Barks)
- 43. The Queen of the Wild Dog Pack (Barks)
- 44. Two in One and The Sheepish Rancher (Branca - Vicar)
- 45. The Secret of the Duckburg Triangle (Diaz)
- 46. The Tides Turn (Branca)
- 47. The Menehune Mystery <AKA Hawaiian Hideaway> (Barks)
- 48. The Great Steamboat Race and Riches, Riches, Everywhere! (Barks)
- 49. The Diary of Sideburns Smew (Santanach)
- 50. The Secret of Atlantis <AKA The Sunken City> (Barks)
- 51. The Treasure of the Ten Avatars (Rosa)
- 52. The Black Diamond and Taking A Gander (Colomer - Branca)
- 53. The Secret of the Incas Part 1 (Cavazzano)
- 54. The Secret of the Incas Part 2 (Cavazzano)

== See also ==
- Disney comics
- Disney comics titles in the USA:
  - Mickey Mouse Magazine (1935-1940)
  - Walt Disney's Comics and Stories (1940-2020)
  - Donald Duck (1942-2017)
  - Mickey Mouse (1943-2017)
  - Uncle Scrooge (1952-2020)
  - Walt Disney Comics Digest (1968-1976)
  - Uncle Scrooge Adventures (1987-1997)
  - Mickey Mouse Adventures (1990-1991)
  - Donald Duck Adventures (1988-1998)
  - Walt Disney Giant (1995-1996)
