= Goofy Adventures =

Goofy Adventures is a comic book published by Disney Comics featuring Goofy as the main character. In this comic book Goofy appears in different parody type stories. This comic book lasted for 17 issues from April 1990 to August 1991, edited by David Seidman.

== List of issues ==
1. Balboa De Goofy, and Goofy Frankenstein Part 1
2. Goofy Frankenstein Part 2, Goofy Peary at the North Pole, and Goof Brothers at Kitty Hawk
3. Covered Wagons Ho and Alexander Goof
4. The Great Goofidini
5. Sir Goof and Knights of the Square Table, and First Goof on the Moon
6. Super Goof and the Thief of Zanzipar
7. Two Muskeeters Plus One
8. Goofy Washington Our Nation's Flounder, A Goofy Look at the Movies, and Star Goof
9. The Name's Goof James Goof
10. Goofy Samurai, and A Goofy Look at Doors
11. Goofis Khan
12. Arizona Goof and the Lost Aztec Temple Part 1
13. Arizona Goof and the Lost Aztec Temple Part 2
14. Alexander Goof The Early Years
15. Super Goof Versus the Cold Ray
16. Sheerluck Goof and the Giggling Ghost of Notenny Moor, and The Goofy Wolfman
17. Back in Time, and Tomb of Goofula

Even after the series was cancelled the Goofy stories occasionally appeared in Walt Disney's Comics and Stories, Donald and Mickey, Donald Duck and Mickey Mouse and Walt Disney Giant.
