= Timeless Tales (Disney comics) =

Publication information
- Publisher: IDW Publishing
- Format: Hardcover
- Genre: Funny animals Adventure
- Publication date: May 2016 – July 2018
- No. of issues: Donald Duck: 3 Mickey Mouse: 3 Uncle Scrooge: 3 Walt Disney's; Comics and Stories: 1 In total: 10
- Main character(s): Donald Duck; Mickey Mouse; Scrooge McDuck; Others

Creative team
- Written by: various
- Penciller(s): various
- Editor(s): Series editor: Sarah Gaydos; Archival editor: David Gerstein; Collection editors - Justin Eisinger, Alonzo Simon

Timeless Tales was a 2016–18 hardcover book collection series, compiling the complete runs of several Disney comics titles from IDW Publishing, including Donald Duck, Mickey Mouse, Uncle Scrooge and Walt Disney's Comics and Stories. The series were released as compiled collector's editions of the single issues of the run of each comic book title, while also in conjunction with the same issues being released in trade paperback collections. The first series to launch was Uncle Scrooge: Timeless Tales - Vol 1 in May 2016. After a total of ten hardcover volumes the four lines of the Timeless Tales series were cancelled, ending with the Walt Disney's Comics and Stories Vault - Vol. 1 in mid 2018.

== Background ==
IDW Publishing got the rights to publish Disney Comics in 2015. They launched four monthly comics titles during the spring and summer of 2015. The monthly single floppy issues they later reissued in trade paperback format, containing three single issues each, in 2016 they also began compiling the single issues of the monthly titles in the Timeless Tales hardcover collection, each of these volumes collecting six single issues, the equivalent of two trade paperbacks.

The last Timeless Tales volume to be solicited but not released was Uncle Scrooge: Timeless Tales - Vol. 4 which was meant to collect #19 to #24 of the Uncle Scrooge comic book from IDW Publishing. The volume was scheduled for a release in February 2018 but was never published.

== Format ==
The hardcover volumes of the collections measure 7.5 inches × 10 inches, (191 mm × 254 mm). All pages are printed in full color. Extras such as introductions by David Gerstein, interviews and biographies of writers and artists are also íncluded. The MSRP of the volumes collecting six issues each was set at $29.99 while it was set at $34.99 for Walt Disney's Comics and Stories Vault - Vol. 1 and at $39.99 for the Mickey Mouse: Timeless Tales - Vol. 3 since each of these contained approximately 40 to 100 pages more than the other published volumes of the series.

Some of the material of the Timeless Tales are since February 2017 also available in digital form via IDW Publishing's digital service and at ComiXology.

== Volumes ==
Donald Duck: Timeless Tales
Volume	Release date	Title	Collected issues (IDW numbering)	Page count	ISBN	INDUCKS link
1	2016-05-31	Donald Duck: Timeless Tales - Vol. 1	#1 – #6	256	978-1-63140-572-3	DD TT 1
2	2017-01-31	Donald Duck: Timeless Tales - Vol. 2	#7 – #12	256	978-1-63140-765-9	DD TT 2
3	2017-08-01	Donald Duck: Timeless Tales - Vol. 3	#13 – #18	256	978-1-63140-911-0	DD TT 3

Mickey Mouse: Timeless Tales
Volume	Release date	Title	Collected issues (IDW numbering)	Page count	ISBN	INDUCKS link
1	2016-06-28	Mickey Mouse: Timeless Tales - Vol. 1	#1 – #6	260	978-1-63140-580-8	MM TT 1
2	2017-02-07	Mickey Mouse: Timeless Tales - Vol. 2	#7 – #12	256	978-1-63140-801-4	MM TT 2
3	2018-03-27	Mickey Mouse: Timeless Tales - Vol. 3	#13 – #21	352	978-1-68405-049-9	MM TT 3

Uncle Scrooge: Timeless Tales
Volume	Release date	Title	Collected issues (IDW numbering)	Page count	ISBN	INDUCKS link
1	2016-05-03	Uncle Scrooge: Timeless Tales - Vol. 1	#1 – #6	240	978-1-63140-566-2	US TT 1
2	2016-12-13	Uncle Scrooge: Timeless Tales - Vol. 2	#7 – #12	256	978-1-63140-672-0	US TT 2
3	2017-08-15	Uncle Scrooge: Timeless Tales - Vol. 3	#13 – #18	256	978-1-63140-935-6	US TT 3

Walt Disney's Comics and Stories Vault
Volume	Release date	Title	Collected issues (legacy numbering)	Page count	ISBN	INDUCKS link
1	2018-07-31	Walt Disney's; Comics and Stories; Vault - Vol. 1	#721 – #734 + 75th Anniversary; Special The Search for the Zodiac Stone serial originally featured in these numbers are not included	294	978-1-68405-180-9	WDC V 1
