= The Ghost of the Grotto =

- Original cover by Carl Buettner
- Story code: W OS 159-01
- Story: Carl Barks
- Ink: Carl Barks
- Date: August 1947
- Pages: 26
- Layout: 4 rows per page
- Appearances: Donald Duck; Huey, Dewey and Louie
- First publication: Four Color #159

"The Ghost of the Grotto" is a 26-page Disney comics story written, drawn, and lettered by Carl Barks. It was first published in Donald Duck Four Color #159 (August 1947).

== Plot ==
Donald Duck and his nephews have rented a boat in order to collect seaweed in the West Indies for money. When they get back on land in order to wait out the low tide so they can collect seaweed inside a grotto, the four hear that "tonight is the night". It turns out that tonight is the night when the ghost of the grotto kidnaps a little boy. With the ducks luck, Dewey is the one to be kidnapped. Now the ducks are faced with the task of saving Dewey and not only have to face the kidnapper, but an octopus guarding a giant ship. The ducks manage to get rid of the octopus by using a ton of pepper, while collecting a ton of seaweed in the process. Later, Donald uses a mouse named Montmorency to disarm the kidnapper. He is revealed to be the latest guardian of the treasure of Sir Francis Drake while Dewey was expected to succeed him. The story ends with the guardian being allowed to keep the treasure and spend it as he sees fit, which to him, is on fancy clothing and hamburgers.

== Development ==
In a 1974 interview with Michael Barrier, Barks said, "I can remember the first idea I had on that was just trying to figure out something Donald could do. I thought of him sailing boats and came up with a potential ten pages of gathering seaweed, and selling this kelp, which would give me a lot of gags with boats. Like I told you before, I think of a scene, I mean a locale, and think, 'Well, I feel in the mood to draw boats, and the ocean, and so on,' and that would cause me to start working on that particular type of story. As I developed more and more things with the story, I think it's quite possible that that 'Ghost of the Grotto' was brought in as a menace. There is so much in that, I couldn't have thought of it in a whole bucketful of writing at once. It had to come out one thing after another."

== Reception ==
Thomas Andrae writes that "The Ghost of the Grotto" marks a turn in Barks' writing toward the themes of Gothic fiction, which focus on "psychic repression and the fragmentation of self-identity, focusing on obsession, taboo, and the irrational." The story "introduces a motif that will inform many later Donald and Scrooge adventures: that western civilization's lust for conquest and empire and obsession with wealth and power invariably lead to alienation and self-disintegration."

== See also ==
- List of Disney comics by Carl Barks
