= Gladstone Publishing =

American publishing company

- Gladstone logo, 1993–1998
- Industry: Comics
- Founded: 1986; 40 years ago
- Defunct: 1998; 28 years ago
- Parent: Another Rainbow Publishing

Gladstone Publishing was an American company that published Disney comics from 1986 to 1990 and from 1993 to 1998. The company had its origins as a subsidiary of Another Rainbow Publishing, a company formed by Bruce Hamilton and Russ Cochran to publish the Carl Barks Library and produce limited edition lithographs of Carl Barks oil paintings of the Disney ducks. The name references Gladstone Gander.

Reprints of classic Donald Duck stories by Carl Barks and Mickey Mouse stories by Floyd Gottfredson were the foundation of their output. Don Rosa, William Van Horn, and Pat Block are among the modern Disney comics artists who got their start at Gladstone. Some of the Van Horn stories had scripts by frequent collaborator John Lustig. The company also published translations of European Disney comic book stories produced by Egmont, Oberon and Mondadori. These included stories by such famed creators as Romano Scarpa, Marco Rota, Daan Jippes and Freddy Milton.

While still distributed on newsstands, their orientation toward the collectors market was visible in their inclusion of scholarly articles, mostly by associate editor Geoffrey Blum. Unlike the previous Disney comic book licensee Western Publishing, Gladstone provided credits for the stories.

Although Gladstone is no longer an active publisher, it continues to offer its back issues through its website.

== First generation (1986–1990) ==
First Gladstone logo, 1986–1990

- Walt Disney's Comics and Stories
- Donald Duck
- Mickey Mouse
- Uncle Scrooge
- Uncle Scrooge Adventures
- Donald Duck Adventures
- Mickey and Donald
- DuckTales

== Second generation (1993–1998) ==
- Walt Disney's Comics and Stories
- Donald and Mickey
- Uncle Scrooge
- Uncle Scrooge Adventures
- Donald Duck
- Donald Duck Adventures
- Donald Duck and Mickey Mouse
- Walt Disney Giant
- Walt Disney's Comics and Stories Penny Pincher
- Uncle Scrooge and Donald Duck
- The Adventurous Uncle Scrooge McDuck

During the second run, there was another implosion in 1998, like the one that Disney Comics had back in 1991. This time, only two comics did not get cancelled – Walt Disney's Comics and Stories and Uncle Scrooge – both of which converted to prestige format.

== Softcover albums ==
During the first run Gladstone issued 28 albums and seven giant albums consisting mostly of reprints of stories by Carl Barks and Floyd Gottfredson. In 1990 Gladstone was licensed to publish a series of albums reprinting nearly all the Disney duck stories of Carl Barks. These were known as The Carl Barks Library in Color consisting of:

- Walt Disney Comics and Stories – Comic Albums #1–51 (With trading cards)
- Uncle Scrooge Adventures – Comic Albums #1–56 (With trading cards)
- Donald Duck Adventures – Comic Albums #1–25 (With trading cards)
- Gyro Gearloose – Comic Albums #1–6
- Uncle Scrooge – One-Pagers – Comic Albums #1 & 2
- Donald Duck 1940s Christmas Giveaways

There were also three different series of Albums featuring stories by Don Rosa and William Van Horn respectively.

- The Don Rosa Library of Uncle Scrooge Adventures in Color #s 1–4 featured The first twelve chapters of The Life and Times of Scrooge McDuck
- The Don Rosa Library of Uncle Scrooge Adventures in Color #s 5–8 featured all the Uncle Scrooge stories that Don Rosa did during his first two years as a Disney Comics Artist.
- The William Van Horn Library of Uncle Scrooge Adventures in Color #s 1–4 featured all of the stories that William Van Horn did during Gladstone's first run.

After its license expired in 1998, Gladstone ceased publishing new material, and there were no more Disney comics in the United States (except for occasional graphic novels based on the Disney films, put out by Dark Horse Comics), until 2003, when Gemstone Publishing gained the publishing rights.

== EC Comics reprints ==
Between 1990 and 1991, Gladstone reprinted four EC Comics titles, in association with EC-fan and publisher Russ Cochran. (Two different EC titles per issue). These included six issues of The Vault of Horror (August 1990 – June 1991), six issues of Tales from the Crypt (July 1990 – May 1991), four issues of Weird Science (September 1990 – March 1991), and two issues of The Haunt of Fear (May/July 1991). After four issues of Weird Science, Gladstone changed it to The Haunt of Fear. This took The Haunt of Fear from The Vault of Horror and replaced it with Weird Fantasy. The Haunt of Fear took Weird Science as its second issue per comic. Tales from the Crypt kept Crime SuspenStories for its double sized horror.

Subsequently, Cochran and the EC reprints moved to Diamond Comics-CEO Steven A Geppi's Gemstone Publishers, which naturally reprinted the Gladstone-printed issues as part of their EC reprints. (Gemstone, whose key editorial staff at startup – John Clark, Gary Leach and Susan Daigle-Leach – previously worked for Gladstone, also subsequently gained the rights to Disney comics, a license formerly held by Gladstone.)
