= Four Color =

1939–1962 anthology comic book series

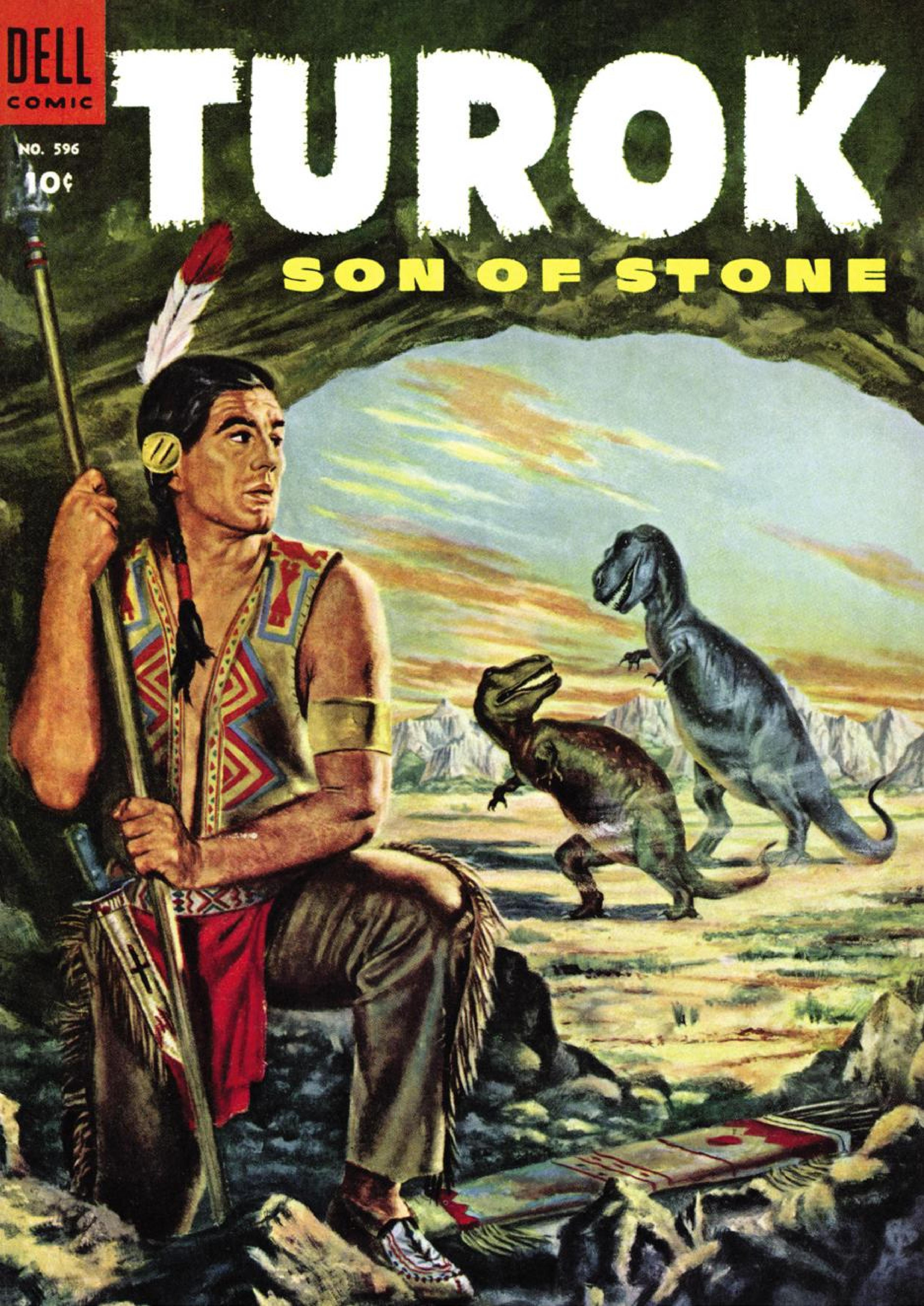
- Cover of Four Color #596 (Dec. 1954), featuring the debut of Turok, art by Robert Susor

Publication information
- Publisher: Dell Comics
- Schedule: Various
- Format: Ongoing series
- Publication date: July–September 1939 – April–June 1962
- No. of issues: 1,354

Four Color, also known as Four Color Comics and Dell Four Color, is an American comic book anthology series published by Dell Comics between 1939 and 1962. The title is a reference to the four basic colors used when printing comic books (cyan, magenta, yellow, and black at the time). The first 25 issues (1939–1942) are known as "series 1". In mid-1942, the numbering started over again, and "series 2" began. After the first 100 issues of the second series, Dell stopped putting the "Four Color Comic" designation on the books, but they continued the numbering system for 20 years.

More than 1,000 issues were published, usually with multiple titles released every month. An exact accounting of the actual number of unique issues produced is difficult because occasional issue numbers were skipped and a number of reprint issues were also included. Nonetheless, the Overstreet Comic Book Price Guide lists well over 1,000 individual issues, ending with #1354. Comics historian Alberto Becattini cites 1332 issues. It currently holds the record for most issues produced of an American comic book title; its nearest rival, DC's Action Comics, reached the 1,000-issue milestone in 2018. However, the actual volume ended at 904 issues, before rebooting.

Four Color published many of the first licensed Disney comics; about 20% of the Four Color issues were devoted to Disney characters.

== History ==
Unlike most comic book series of the day, which were either devoted to one character, or were anthologies with collections of stories starring the cartoon characters of a particular studio, Four Color instead devoted each individual issue to different characters. One issue might feature a popular cartoon character, while the next might be an adaptation of a popular movie or TV series. Thus, the phrase "one shot" was used in the publisher's code in the first interior page of the first story. For example, issue 223 (1949) was denoted DDOS 223, which translates as Donald Duck One-Shot #223. Most Four Color titles featured licensed properties; relatively few original characters were created for the line. The first Four Color comic featured comic strip and movie serial hero Dick Tracy; the last (issue number 1,354, series 2, dated April–June 1962) was based upon the TV series Calvin and the Colonel.

Comics historian Gary Brown wrote, "In the Four Color Series, you get a good sense of what America was like in the 1950s. Admittedly, it might be a white, middle-class version of the country, but the series hit on every fad, every icon, and every popular piece of culture that America embraced during this time span. Dell comics released anywhere from one to a half dozen Four Color titles a month, touching on topics such as the Old West, animation characters, newspaper comic strips, radio programs, TV programs, movies, and even pop music. For the most part, the series reflected what entertained America in the 1950s — and not just kids, but adults, as well."

Many of the early Four Color issues were reprints of newspaper comic strips; the first series included Dick Tracy, Little Orphan Annie, Mickey Mouse, Donald Duck, and Terry and the Pirates, among others. The only two issues from the first series that published comic book stories were based on new Walt Disney films. Issue #13 featured an adaptation of The Reluctant Dragon, and a Dumbo adaptation was the focus of issue #17.

The comic strip reprints continued well into the 1942 second series. Of the first 10 issues, eight are strip reprints, including Little Joe, Harold Teen, Alley Oop, and Flash Gordon. The first two original stories in the second series are issue #5, Raggedy Ann and Andy, and issue #9, Donald Duck Finds Pirate Gold. The series continued strip reprints of Dick Tracy until issue #163 (Sept 1947), Little Orphan Annie until issue #206 (Dec 1948) and Harold Teen until issue #209 (Jan 1949).

The focus of the series moved to original comic book stories, though, and soon, the primary purpose behind Four Color was as a try-out showcase for potential new Dell Comics series. For example, Tarzan and Little Lulu in early 1948 launched their own titles (starting with no. 1) after proving themselves via a number of Four Color try-out issues. However, during the 1940s, the transition was not always so prompt, as a number of prominent funny animal characters starred in 20–30 issues of Four Color (these include Mickey Mouse, Donald Duck, and Porky Pig). Comic book historian Michael Barrier notes that by the early 1950s, Dell seemed to be giving more emphasis to subscription sales (promoted via premium giveaways as part of the Dell Comics Club), which necessitated stable series instead of one-shots.

At one point in 1951, some issues of Four Color were double-numbered, reflecting the issuances for particular characters; thus issues 318 and 328, featuring Donald Duck, carried the notation "nos. 1–2" on the cover underneath the Four Color series number. Indeed, beginning in the early 1950s, it became more prevalent than previously for Four Color titles, if they proved popular enough, to become ongoing, independent series. In some cases, the issue numbering of these spin-offs took into account any previous Four Color issues (albeit sometimes miscounting the one-shots; Donald Duck started with #26 despite the publication of 29 Four Color issues with the character preceding it).

Only issues published between circa 1940 and 1946 actually carried the title Four Color Comic on the cover. (Note: Documenting the extent of the Four Color series was among the bibliographic tasks undertaken in the early 1960s by emerging comic book fandom. Fans Donald and Maggie Thompson took the lead in this endeavor, and in 1968, finally issued A Listing of Dell Special Series Comic Books (and a Few Others) as Bibliographic Supplement no. 1 to their fanzine Comic Art. In its 35 pages, it listed not only individual titles of comic books published in the Color/Four Color series, but also those in these series: Black and White, Large Feature, United Feature Single Series, Comics on Parade, McKay Feature Books, Stories by Famous Authors Illustrated, and Classics Illustrated (Classic Comics).)

Four Color ended its run around the same time Dell's partnership with Western Publishing came to an end. Western subsequently formed a competing company, Gold Key Comics, and took over a number of licenses previously held by Dell. This included numerous titles featured under the Four Color banner that were then continued as ongoing series under Gold Key; this included most of the Disney and Hanna-Barbera properties.
