= Noel Van Horn =

American comic artist (born 1968)

- Born: July 6, 1968 (age 58) San Francisco, California, U.S.
- Areas: Artist, writer

Noel Van Horn (born July 6, 1968) is a cartoonist born in the United States and living in Canada. He mainly produces Disney comics starring Mickey Mouse. He is the son of William Van Horn, a comics artist who is also well known for his work in Disney comics.

== Life and career ==
Noel Van Horn was born on July 6, 1968, in San Francisco as the son of William Van Horn and a Canadian mother. Inspired by his father's work as an animator when Noel was a child, he wanted to become an artist as well. Noel enjoyed the Walt Disney's Comics and Stories comic books in his childhood. In 1980, his family moved to Vancouver, British Columbia, Canada. After finishing school, Van Horn studied animation at the Emily Carr College of Art and Design. In 1992, Van Horn went to San Diego in the United States, where he met Byron Erickson and Bob Foster, editors of Egmont, the Danish publisher of Disney comics. Van Horn wanted to draw Bucky Bug comics, but the Egmont editors were in search for Mickey Mouse comics artists. He accepted this offer and started an 18 months long training. Van Horn was instructed to form Mickey's character vividly and to give him an American touch. Van Horn finally joined Egmont in 1993. Today, Noel Van Horn still lives in the Vancouver area. He has a daughter. Van Horn is a freelancing full-time artist at Egmont and works at home in his own studio.

Van Horn's work is inspired by the American comics artists Dave Stevens and Floyd Gottfredson, but also by his father. Noel and William Van Horn have a similar style, but while Noel mostly uses characters from the Mickey Mouse universe, including Goofy, his father is specialized on the Scrooge McDuck universe. Noel wrote a single Donald Duck comic drawn by his father, To Bee Or Not To Bee, which was first published in 1998. In 2007, the first and only comic starring Bucky Bug drawn by Noel Van Horn was published on the occasion of this character's 75th anniversary. Van Horn's works are mainly published in European Disney comic books, especially in Scandinavian countries, Germany, and Poland.
