= John Lustig =

American comics writer (born 1953)

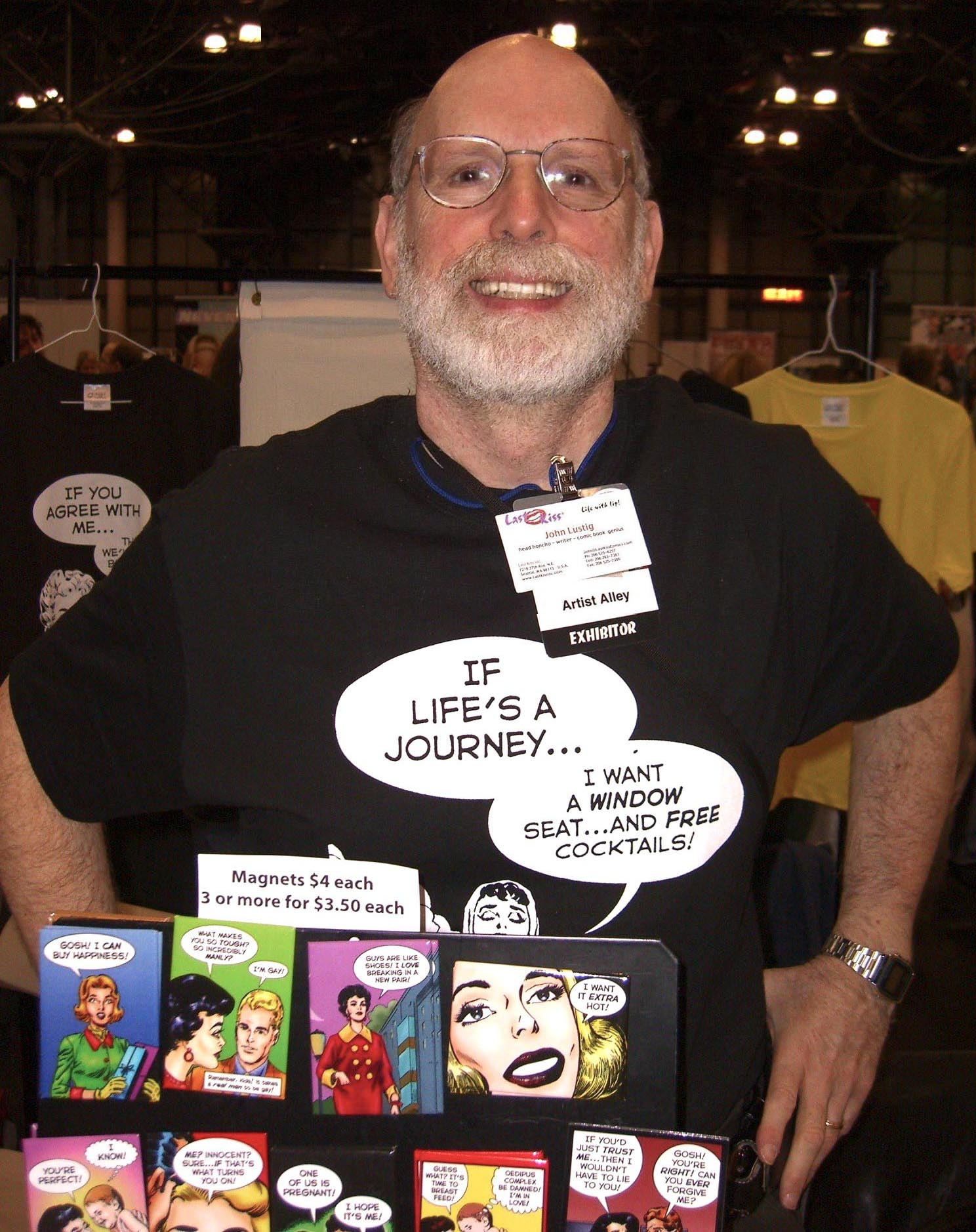
- Lustig at the New York Comic Con in Manhattan, October 10, 2010.
- Born: January 25, 1953 (age 73)
- Area: Writer

John Lustig (born January 25, 1953) is an American comics writer and former journalist, principally known for his Disney comics scripts featuring Donald Duck and other members of Disney's Duck family. Lustig's scripts have been illustrated by William Van Horn and other artists. In addition, Lustig has written Mickey Mouse scripts that have been drawn by Noel Van Horn (William's son) and others. His first script was for Gold Key Comics ("Flatfood Duck" Daffy Duck #112 [Dec. 1977]), done just after graduating from college (it would be a decade before he wrote any other comics).

Lustig has also become known for his post-modern rescripting of panels from old romance comic pages previously published by Charlton Comics under the banner Last Kiss. Besides four issues of the comic book Last Kiss, the panels have also become a regular feature of Comics Buyer's Guide, and recently expanded into being featured on T-shirts, greeting cards, and other merchandise.
