= William Van Horn =

American comics artist and writer

- Born: William Roger Van Horn; February 15, 1939 (age 87) Oakland, California, U.S.
- Areas: Artist, writer

William Van Horn (born February 15, 1939) is an American Disney comics artist and writer, and has been since 1988. He draws mostly Donald Duck and Uncle Scrooge stories, and he has also written and/or illustrated stories based on the animated series DuckTales. Some of these stories featured Launchpad McQuack as the main character. William's son Noel Van Horn is also a Disney comics artist, focusing on Mickey Mouse stories.

== Work ==
Prior to his association with Disney, Van Horn drew and wrote the black-and-white comic book Nervous Rex for Blackthorne Publishing. Focusing on the misadventures of a small, non-violent tyrannosaurus, the series ran for ten issues, from 1985 to 1987. Afterward, also for Blackthorne, he drew and wrote a short-lived superhero parody comic called "Possibleman," which ran for two issues.

In the first years of his career as a Disney Comics artist William often worked with John Lustig on the stories. In 1994 he did the art for Carl Barks' final script, Horsing around with History, which was released in Uncle Scrooge Adventures #33 (October 1994).

Here is a list of characters William Van Horn created for the Duck universe:

- Baron Itzy Bitzy – a whistling flea that Scrooge has.
- Rumpus McFowl – Scrooge's half brother who at first was believed to be Scrooge's cousin.
- Woimly Filcher – an enemy of Donald Duck and his nephews.

He often draws a small fly or mosquito flying around his comics.

== Reprints ==
In November 2020 it was announced that Van Horn's Disney comics would get comprehensively collected as a part of Fantagraphics Disney Masters line beginning in 2021.

- Walt Disney's Uncle Scrooge: Pie in the Sky: Disney Masters Vol. 18, 2021, Fantagraphics, 978-1-68396-441-4
