= Walt Disney Comics Digest =

Walt Disney Comics Digest is one of three digest size comics published by Gold Key Comics in the early 1970s. The other two were Mystery Comics Digest and Golden Comics Digest. It was the first digest-sized regular Disney comic published in the US, and was very successful, offering relief from the company's slipping comic book sales.

== History ==
Walt Disney Comics Digest was published for 57 issues from June 1968 to February 1976. The contents consisted of both new material and reprints, mainly from the various licensed Disney properties published by Gold Key. Most focused on the Disney animated characters (Mickey Mouse et al., Donald Duck et al., Junior Woodchucks, Uncle Scrooge, Gyro Gearloose, Chip 'n' Dale, Scamp, Peter Pan, etc.), but also included adaptations of live action Disney films and TV shows, such as 20,000 Leagues Under the Sea, Zorro, True Life Adventures, Summer Magic, Kidnapped, and more.

The new material was mostly drawn by Paul Murry, Tony Strobl, Pete Alvarado and Al Hubbard, and featured characters from Song of the South, Bambi, Dumbo, Little Hiawatha and The Jungle Book.

A new character, the cowboy hero Buck Duck, was introduced in issue #7 (Jan 1969), in the Murry story "When You Show Your Gums... Smile!" Buck, "the Last of the Good Guys", lived in the Old West town of Bootsville with his trusty horse Spot. Buck had a laconic personality who spoke little, and when he did speak he used terse sentences of monosyllabic words. The Sheriff was a cowardly fowl named Chicken Duck, and the love interest was represented by Calamity Duck, who owned a sarsaparilla saloon. Buck made five appearances in Walt Disney Comics Digest; the last story, "Showdown in Dishwater Gully", was published in issue #42 (Aug 1973). Buck also appeared in a 1970 Donald Duck story, and a 1977 Chip 'n' Dale story.

Walt Disney Comics Digest also featured six stories with the rarely seen character Glory-Bee, introduced in the Mickey Mouse comic strip in 1969. Glory-Bee first appeared in Digest in "The Goofy Trap" (issue #33, Feb 1972); her final appearance in the comic was in "Hero for a Day" (issue #53, June 1975).

Besides stories, there were various text features, including puzzle pages and Minnie Mouse's Hollywood gossip column, plus reprints of Disney's panel comic strips Merry Menagerie and True Life Adventures.

Initially, the digest was 196 pages, but gradually shrunk until the last issues were 132 pages. As distinguished from standard comics, the digest was square-bound with a glued binding. In many cases, stories were reformatted to fit the digest format.

== See also ==
- Disney comics
- Disney comics titles in the USA:
  - Mickey Mouse Magazine (1935–1940)
  - Walt Disney's Comics and Stories (1940–2020)
  - Donald Duck (1942–2017)
  - Mickey Mouse (1943–2017)
  - Uncle Scrooge (1952–2020)
  - Walt Disney Comics Digest (1968–1976)
  - Uncle Scrooge Adventures (1987–1997)
  - Mickey Mouse Adventures (1990–1991)
  - Donald Duck Adventures (1988–1998)
  - Walt Disney Giant (1995–1996)
