= Byron Erickson =

American editor and writer

Byron Erickson (born February 3, 1951, Tucson, Arizona) is an American editor and writer in the comic book industry. He works at Egmont on Disney comic books, and was formerly Don Rosa's editor.

Erickson began working at Another Rainbow Publishing in 1983, and when they received the license to publish Disney comics in the United States under the name of Gladstone Publishing, he became the editor. After Disney took over the license, Erickson left Gladstone Publishing for First Comics as an editor for various comics. He later moved to Denmark and joined Egmont (then known as Gutenberghus), first as editor/writer, then as editor-in-chief, and later as creative director.
