= Floyd Gottfredson =

American cartoonist (1905–1986)

- Born: Arthur Floyd Gottfredson; May 5, 1905 Kaysville, Utah, U.S.
- Died: July 22, 1986 (aged 81) Montrose, California, U.S.
- Areas: Artist, writer
- Notable works: Mickey Mouse comic strip
- Awards: Inkpot Award (1983)

Arthur Floyd Gottfredson (May 5, 1905 – July 22, 1986) was an American cartoonist best known for his defining work on the Mickey Mouse comic strip, which he worked on from 1930 until his retirement in 1975. His contribution to Mickey Mouse comics is comparable to Carl Barks's on the Donald Duck comics. 17 years after his death, his memory was honored with the Disney Legends award in 2003 and induction into the Comic Book Hall of Fame in 2006.

== Biography ==
=== Early life and career ===
Gottfredson was born into a large family in Kaysville, Utah, in 1905, and raised in the Church of Jesus Christ of Latter-day Saints. As a child, Floyd severely injured his arm in a hunting accident. Housebound during a long recovery, he became interested in cartooning and took several cartooning correspondence courses. Because of his injury, Gottfredson had to draw using his whole arm. In 1926, he took the Federal Schools of Illustrating and Cartooning's correspondence course, and by the late 1920s, he was drawing cartoons for trade magazines and the Salt Lake City Telegram newspaper.

After achieving second place in a 1928 cartoon contest, the 23-year-old Gottfredson moved to Southern California with his wife and family, just before Christmas. At the time, there were seven major newspapers in the area, but he was unable to find work with any. One job he had held in Utah, however, was as a movie projectionist and he found employment in that field in California. A year later, the movie theater where he had been working was torn down, resulting in another job search. On a whim, Gottfredson inquired at Disney studios, which hired him the same day.

=== Mickey Mouse ===
Walt Disney Productions hired Gottfredson as an apprentice animator and in-betweener on December 19, 1929. In April 1930, he started working on the four-month-old Mickey Mouse daily comic strip. It had originally been scripted by Walt Disney and drawn by Ub Iwerks who was succeeded by Win Smith. Iwerks later left Disney and tried to hire Gottfredson, but Roy Disney refused to allow Gottfredson out of his contract. In May, Win Smith refused to write the strip, and Disney assigned Gottfredson to it, promising it would be only a temporary arrangement until someone else could be found to take over. Gottfredson continued to produce the Mickey Mouse strips for the next 45 years.

Gottfredson's first daily strip was published in newspapers on his 25th birthday, May 5, 1930. In January 1932, he began work on the newly inaugurated Mickey Mouse color Sunday strip which, in addition to the daily, he continued through mid-1938. Gottfredson headed the comics department at Disney from 1930 to 1946, and was replaced by Frank Reilly.

Originally, Gottfredson wrote and drew the Mickey Mouse strip alone, but in 1932, he pulled back to plotting the stories and doing the penciling, while the dialogue was mostly done by other hands. Scripts were written by Webb Smith (1932–33), Ted Osborne (1933–38), Merrill De Maris (1933–42), Dick Shaw (1942–43), Bill Walsh (1943–64), Roy Williams (1962-69) and Del Connell (1968–88). Even so, Gottfredson always worked closely with his writers, and would often suggest changes in the scripts whenever he thought it would improve a story. There were a variety of inkers on the strip through the years; inkers for the Sunday strips included Al Taliaferro and Ted Thwaites in the 1930s, and Manuel Gonzales until 1981; Taliaferro also inked daily strips. Gottfredson returned to inking daily strips himself in 1947.

From the beginning, the strips were parts of long continuing stories. These introduced characters such as the Phantom Blot, Eega Beeva, and the Bat Bandit, which Gottfredson created; Disney created Eli Squinch, Mickey's nephews, Morty and Ferdie Fieldmouse, and Sylvester Shyster, who were also introduced in the comic. Gottfredson plotted the continuities until Bill Walsh started writing the strip in 1943. The stories were always untitled. Titles were usually assigned later, when the strips or pages were reprinted in picture-books or comic books, which the artists had no influence on. Starting in the 1950s, Gottfredson and writer Bill Walsh were instructed to drop the storylines and do only daily gags. Gottfredson continued illustrating the daily strip until he retired on October 1, 1975.

Animation critic Geoffrey Blum said "Gottfredson's Mormon upbringing and his unflaggingly positive outlook made him the perfect keeper for this icon. Never complaining, chocking back his hurts... this is the ethic he brought to Mickey. Gottfredson's mouse combines the virtues of a good citizen and a good soldier."

== Reprints and compilations ==
Gottfredson's Mickey strips were often collected in the 1930s and 1940s. Western Publishing's Big Little Book series based most of its Mickey volumes on the strip; Dell Publishing's Walt Disney's Comics and Stories serialized stories from the strip through 1948.

Modern-day American reprints began with "The Bar None Ranch" (1940), which appeared in Walt Disney Comics Digest #40 (1973). The following year "The Bat Bandit" (1934) appeared in a deluxe edition, The Best of Walt Disney Comics. Abbeville Press' large size Best Comics anthologies in the late-1970s included two all-Gottfredson volumes (one headlined "Goofy"), though the stories were relettered and sometimes condensed. In 1980, Abbeville issued a small-size Best Comics series that included three all-Gottfredson volumes (again, one headlined "Goofy"), all of which reprinted stories from the earlier large-size editions. In 1986, Another Rainbow/Gladstone Publishing (and later Gemstone Publishing) began a tradition of serializing Gottfredson stories in regular Disney monthly comic books, which continued on and off until 2008, when they ceased publication. Gladstone also collected a number of Gottfredson's serials in the larger-size "comic albums" it issued during the 1980s; in 1990, Disney Comics issued "Mickey Mouse Outwits the Phantom Blot" (1939) in the same format.

In 2007, Gemstone Publishing announced The Floyd Gottfredson Library, a comprehensive edition of Gottfredson's serialized stories (Mickey 1930–1955, plus later non-Mickey material). The series was postponed, then canceled once Gemstone no longer had the Disney license. In 2011, Fantagraphics Books resumed production of the series with the same editorial team, now titled Walt Disney's Mickey Mouse. A total of 14 volumes were published between 2011 and 2018, collecting the entirety of Gottfredson's Sunday color work (two volumes) and all of his serialized daily strips (twelve volumes).

== Legacy ==
In the late 1970s and early 1980s, before his health deteriorated, Gottfredson gave interviews to many comics-oriented magazines as well as mainstream publications. The deluxe edition of the book Mickey Mouse in Color included a small record containing an audio interview with Gottfredson and Disney Donald Duck-comic book artist Carl Barks. During the 1970s, Gottfredson attended the OrlandoCon and in 1983 the San Diego Comic Book convention and annual convention of The Mouse Club.

Between 1978 and 1983, Gottfredson did a total of 24 paintings commissioned by collector Malcolm Willits, inspired by the success of the paintings of the Disney ducks done by Carl Barks. The paintings depict various storylines from the classic period of the Mickey strip.

Gottfredson's work had been printed in newspapers, magazines, and comic books worldwide for over 50 years, but as a Disney employee, he was never allowed to sign it. Gottfredson's identity was finally revealed in the mid-1960s by fan Malcolm Willits. Subsequently, reprints of his Mickey Mouse strips in the 1970s gave him credit.

Floyd Gottfredson died at his home in Southern California at the age of 81. In 2006, Gottfredson was inducted into the Will Eisner Comic Industry Awards' Hall of Fame. He also was awarded an Inkpot Award in 1983.

Fellow Disney Legend Floyd Norman notes the drawing desk Gottfredson used today "occupies a corner in a special room at Disney's Publishing department in Burbank."
