= Kay Kamen =

American businessman

- Born: Herman Samuel Kominetzky; January 27, 1892; Baltimore, Maryland, U.S.
- Died: October 28, 1949 (aged 57); São Miguel Island, Azores, Portugal
- Occupation: Merchandising executive
- Known for: Work with The Walt Disney Company; Promoting Mickey Mouse

Herman "Kay" Kamen (born Herman Samuel Kominetzky; January 27, 1892 – October 28, 1949) was an American merchandising executive, who worked for the Walt Disney Company. He promoted merchandise in association with the Walt Disney Company including Mickey Mouse – the most popular cartoon character of the early 1930s.

== Early life ==
Kamen was born January 27, 1892, in Baltimore, Maryland, to Russian-Jewish parents. He spent his early life working as a merchant and an advertising man. Kamen was the youngest of four children. He did not finish high school and spent time in a juvenile penitentiary. His first work was selling mink hats in Nebraska in his twenties. He appeared to be a good salesman.

== Career ==
In his thirties Kamen founded a marketing company based in Kansas City, Missouri. The company's specialization was developing products based on movies and negotiation of merchandising agreements for a number of prominent animated figures.

In 1932, Kamen contacted Walt and Roy O. Disney with a proposal to handle licensing of their characters. They were receptive and invited him to come to the studio and make a presentation. Sensing a major opportunity, Kamen immediately withdrew his life savings from the bank and sewed the money into his coat for the two-day train trip to Los Angeles the same day and stayed awake for the entire trip for fear of having his coat stolen. Upon arriving at the Disney Brothers' office, Kamen spread the money on their desk and promised them that amount plus 50% of the revenue he would generate with the merchandising license.

As a result, Kamen (although briefly delayed by him falling asleep while the Disneys were privately conferring over the offer) secured the licensing agreement for all Disney merchandising, a contract his firm would hold for the next two decades. (Note: "1932". sources: *Walt Disney - An American Original, by Bob Thomas, 1994. Page 107. *Disneyana: Walt Disney Collectibles, by Cecil Munsey, 1974. Page 108. *Building a Company - Roy O. Disney and the Creation of an Entertainment Empire, by Bob Thomas, 1998. Page 70. *Walt Disney - The Triumph of the American Imagination, by Neal Gabler, 2006. Page 197.) Kamen's firm quickly monetized Mickey Mouse's image, providing a much-needed line of cash to the struggling Disney firm through its Walt Disney Enterprises division. The following year, Kamen's firm developed the Mickey Mouse watch, which was produced by Ingersoll-Waterbury and soon became the bestselling watch in the United States. The success of the Mickey Mouse watch not only provided much needed revenue to the Walt Disney company, but it rescued the Ingersoll-Waterbury watch company from certain bankruptcy. By 1948, revenue of licensed Disney products totaled more than $100 million. Kamen and WDE developed product lines for many of Disney's films and franchises, particularly Snow White and the Seven Dwarfs.

Kamen died in the 1949 Air France Lockheed Constellation crash on São Miguel Island, in the Azores at the age of 57.
