= Disney Comics (publishing) =

Comic book publishing imprint

- Parent company: Disney Publishing Worldwide
- Status: Revived as an imprint by Disney Publishing Worldwide in 2013
- Founded: 1990; 36 years ago
- Defunct: 1993; 33 years ago
- Key people: Len Wein (editor-in-chief); Art Young (editor); Bob Foster (editor); Cris Palomino (editor)
- Publication types: Comic books
- Imprints: Vista Comics (planned); Touchmark Comics (announced; never published)

Disney Comics is currently a label of Disney Publishing Worldwide and was a comic book publishing company operated by The Walt Disney Company from 1990 to 1993. It was connected with W. D. Publications, Inc., which was a subsidiary of The Walt Disney Company that published Disney comics during that time span. W. D. Publications, Inc. created Disney Comics in 1990 so that The Walt Disney Company would not have to rely on outside publishers such as Gladstone Publishing. In the US, Disney only licensed Disney comic books to other publishers prior to 1990.

Since the demise of the Disney Comics line, Disney continued to print comics in the magazine Disney Adventures, which was published from 1990 to 2007. Disney has licensed their properties to various US comics publishers. Disney reentered the periodical comics market through their 2009 purchase of Marvel Entertainment. Marvel and Disney Publishing began jointly publishing Disney/Pixar Presents magazine in May 2011 but did not revive the Disney Comics imprint, as Boom! Studios (and later IDW Publishing) would continue to publish classic Disney character comics.

== History ==
=== Initial titles ===
In its first year and a half, Disney Comics published:

- Walt Disney's Comics and Stories (issues #548-585)
- Uncle Scrooge (issues #243-280)
- Donald Duck Adventures (38 issues)
- DuckTales (18 issues)
- Mickey Mouse Adventures (18 issues)
- Goofy Adventures (17 issues)
- Roger Rabbit (comic book) (18 issues)
- Chip 'n Dale Rescue Rangers (19 issues)
- TaleSpin (a 4-issue limited series based on the series premiere episode, followed by 7 regular issues)
- Roger Rabbit's Toontown (5 issues)
- Seasonal specials: Autumn Adventures (2 issues, 1990–1991), Holiday Parade (2 issues, 1990–1991), Summer Fun (1991) and Spring Fever (1991)

=== Initial collections ===
Additionally, during the company's first year, eight trade paperbacks called Disney Comics Album were published. These featured older stories, prefaced by opening editorials similar to the earlier Gladstone Comic Album series.

1. Donald Duck and Gyro Gearloose
2. Uncle Scrooge and the Phantom of Notre Duck
3. Donald Duck in Dangerous Disguise
4. Mickey Mouse Outwits the Phantom Blot
5. Chip 'n Dale Rescue Rangers: The Secret Casebook
6. Uncle Scrooge in Tralla-La
7. Donald Duck in Too Many Pets!
8. Super Goof — The World's Silliest Super-Hero!

Giant-sized seasonal specials included two issues apiece of Autumn Adventures and Holiday Parade, and one issue apiece of Spring Fever and Summer Fun. All of these titles were new to Disney and most were published only by them, with the exception of Spring Fever (revived by Gemstone Publishing in 2007–2008).

=== Planned expansion ===
In this period, aggressive plans for expansion were announced. At one Comic Con panel, slides of a realistic European barbarian strip were previewed as one of many new titles in development. One planned imprint, Vista Comics, would showcase superheroes, many to be adapted from Disney films such as Tron and The Scarecrow of Romney Marsh, and was being developed by comic book writer and animated TV story-editor Martin Pasko. A second imprint, Touchmark Comics (named to echo Disney's Touchstone Pictures label for adult-targeted films) was actually announced, with former DC Comics editor Art Young at its head. Among the scripts Touchmark acquired were Enigma by Peter Milligan and Sebastian O by Grant Morrison. A third imprint, Hollywood Comics, was to be modeled after the newly launched Hollywood Pictures film label and offered a 64-page graphic novel adaptation of Hollywood Pictures' first film, Arachnophobia, as its debut offering. An adaptation of the Final Fantasy video game franchise (specifically Final Fantasy II) was also in the works, with Kurt Busiek writing at least two issues.

Editor-in-Chief Len Wein's Marvel Comics-esque approach to the Disney characters was criticized by many older Disney fans. The hiring of Wein has been championed by the comic book creative community as an alternative to the much disliked former Marvel Comics Editor-in-Chief Jim Shooter, who had made a favorable impression when interviewed by Disney management. Prior to the launch of the comics division, Disney management proclaimed their intention to quickly become a dominant presence in the comic book market, competing with industry leaders DC and Marvel.

=== The "Disney Implosion" ===
These unreasonable expectations, coupled with poor sales, led to a mass cancellation in 1991. Echoing what had been called the DC Implosion of the 1970s, Duckburg Times editor Dana Gabbard dubbed this the Disney Implosion. Walt Disney's Comics and Stories, Uncle Scrooge, and Donald Duck Adventures were the only surviving titles.

=== Remaining titles ===
Following the cancellations, the three titles continued being published along with an occasional mini-series based on a TV show or a movie. These included:

- Darkwing Duck (4 issues, 1991)
- The Little Mermaid (4 issues, 1992)
- Dinosaurs (2 issues, 1992–1993)
- Disney's Comics in 3-D (2 issues, 1992)
- The New Adventures of Beauty and the Beast (2 issues, 1992)
- Sebastian (2 issues, 1992)
- The Return of Aladdin (2 issues, 1993)

All plans for expansion, however, were cancelled. Editor Art Young moved back to DC, and many of the unpublished Touchmark titles were published as part of its new Vertigo imprint. Wein left and Marv Wolfman concentrated on being comics editor of Disney Adventures. In a mini-renaissance, editors Bob Foster, Cris Palomino, and David Seidman brought an appreciation of the classic Disney characters to the three continuing titles. Foster especially after a lifetime of involvement with Disney comic books and strips specialized in reprinting rarities even seasoned fans were unaware of. The Disney Studio finally decided to shut down its comic book publishing division in 1993.

=== Imprint ===
In November 2013, Disney Publishing Worldwide revived Disney Comics as an imprint in the US for sporadic publishing. The imprint's first publication was the Space Mountain graphic novel, its first original graphic novel, released on May 7, 2014.
