= Daan Jippes =

Dutch cartoonist (born 1945)

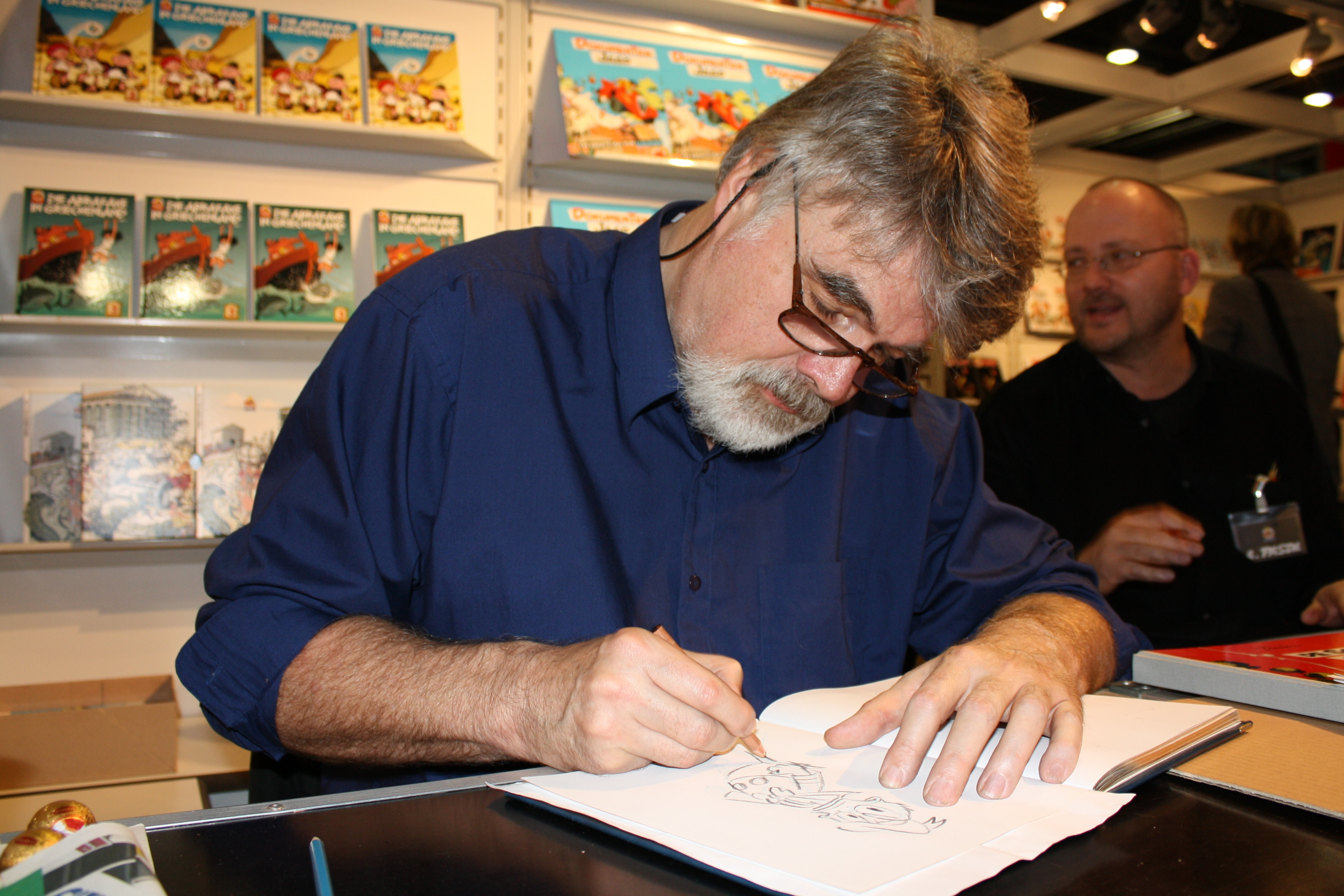
- Daan Jippes at the Frankfurt Book Fair 2009.
- Born: Daniel Jan Jippes; October 14, 1945 (age 81) Amsterdam, Netherlands
- Areas: Artist, writer

Daniel Jan "Daan" Jippes (born 14 October 1945) is a Dutch cartoonist who's known for his work on Disney comics. In the 1980s and 1990s he drew many covers for Gladstone Publishing's Disney magazines. In the 1990s he redrew for Egmont old Junior Woodchucks stories from the 1970s, originally written by Carl Barks and drawn by John Carey, Kay Wright and Tony Strobl.

== Biography ==
Daan Jippes started his comics career in the Netherlands, where his work was published in the comics magazine Pep in the late 1960s and early 1970s. He rose to national recognition with his comics album Bernard Voorzichtig: Twee Voor Thee. In the mid seventies he started working for the Dutch Donald Duck magazine, where his interpretation of the ducks and Mickey Mouse drew the attention of the Disney Studios in Burbank, California. Subsequently he was hired and worked for the Disney company; initially for the comic strip and merchandising department, later for the animation department as a designer and storyboarder, contributing to such films as The Rescuers Down Under, The Prince and the Pauper, Beauty and the Beast and Aladdin. Aside from his work at Disney, he also worked as a storyboard supervisor on Amblimation's Balto and provided covers in Disney style for the comic books of Gladstone Publishing.

Back in the Netherlands, in 2006 Jippes started a new album series, based on the detective stories by Havank, drawn in a Marcinelle style similar to Franquin. Two albums have been published. In 2013 Jippes stated in an interview: "that project's dead in the water. Though I've finished writing a third story I lack the time and funding to start drawing and coloring those 44-plus pages."

== Reprints ==
In 2018 a volume was dedicated to Daan Jippes and Freddy Milton in the Disney Masters book series by Fantagraphics Books. The volume was titled Donald Duck: The Great Survival Test (2018) ISBN 978-1-68396-111-6.

Since 2021 the Carl Barks' scripted Junior Woodchuck stories that Jippes finished are being reprinted in Fantagraphics' series The Complete Carl Barks Disney Library. These stories are featured in the following volumes:

- The Complete Carl Barks Disney Library, Vol 25 - Donald Duck: Balloonatics (2021) ISBN 978-1-68396-474-2
- The Complete Carl Barks Disney Library, Vol 27 - Donald Duck: Duck Luck (2022) ISBN 978-1-68396-653-1
- The Complete Carl Barks Disney Library, Vol 29 - Donald Duck: The Lonely Lighthouse on Cape Quack (2025) ISBN 979-8-87500-150-5
- The Complete Carl Barks Disney Library, Vol 31 - Donald Duck: Christmas Cheers (2026) ISBN 979-8-8750-0255-7
