= List of Disney comics by Don Rosa =

This is a complete list of Disney comics by Don Rosa. It is sorted in chronological order after the date of first publication.

== List ==
=== Original ===
#	Date	Title	Pages	Hero	Ink	Story	Story code
1	1987-07	The Son of the Sun	26	Scrooge McDuck	Don Rosa	Don Rosa	AR 102
2	1987-08	Nobody's Business	10	Donald Duck	Don Rosa	Don Rosa	AR 103
3	1987-10	Mythological Menagerie	10	Donald Duck	Don Rosa	Don Rosa	AR 104
4	1987-12	Recalled Wreck	10	Donald Duck	Don Rosa	Don Rosa	AR 105
5	1987-12	Cash Flow	26	Scrooge McDuck	Don Rosa	Don Rosa	AR 106
6	1988-02	Fit to Be Pied	10	Donald Duck	Don Rosa	Don Rosa	AR 108
7	1988-03	Fir-Tree Fracas	4	Donald Duck	Don Rosa	Don Rosa	AR 109
8	1988-04	Oolated Luck	10	Donald Duck	Don Rosa	Don Rosa	AR 110
9	1988-05	The Paper Chase	2	Scrooge McDuck	Don Rosa	Gary Leach	AR 107
10	1988-06	Last Sled to Dawson	28	Scrooge McDuck	Don Rosa	Don Rosa	AR 113
11	1988-07	Rocket Reverie	2	Donald Duck	Don Rosa	Gary Leach	AR 116
12	1988-07	Fiscal Fitness	2	Scrooge McDuck	Don Rosa	Gary Leach	AR 118
13	1988-08	Metaphorically Spanking	10	Donald Duck	Don Rosa	Don Rosa	AR 119
14	1988-10	The Crocodile Collector	18	Donald Duck	Don Rosa	Don Rosa	AR 125
15	1988-11	Fortune on the Rocks or His Fortune on the Rocks	12	Scrooge McDuck	Don Rosa	Don Rosa	AR 128
16	1989-05	Return to Plain Awful	28	Donald Duck	Don Rosa	Don Rosa	AR 130
17	1989-07	The Curse of Nostrildamus	10	Scrooge McDuck	Don Rosa	Don Rosa	AR 143
18	1989-08	His Majesty, McDuck	28	Scrooge McDuck	Don Rosa	Don Rosa	AR 145
19	1989-11	How Green Was My Lettuce	1/4	Scrooge McDuck	Don Rosa	Don Rosa	ARC 241B
20	1990-03	Untitled (Forget Me Not)	3	Daisy Duck	Don Rosa	Ruud Straatman	H 87112
21	1990-03	Untitled (Give Unto Others)	7	Donald Duck	Don Rosa	Arno Buitink	H 87178
22	1990-03	On a Silver Platter	10	Scrooge McDuck	Don Rosa, Mau Heymans	Don Rosa	H 89068
23	1990-04	Untitled (Making the Grade or Well-Educated Duck)	10	Donald Duck	Don Rosa	Jan Kruse	H 85218
24	1990-04	Untitled (Leaky Luck)	1	Scrooge McDuck	Don Rosa	Evert Geradts	H 87173
25	1990-05	The Pied Piper of Duckburg	8	Gyro Gearloose	Don Rosa, Carl Barks	Don Rosa, Carl Barks	H 89174
26	1990-09	Back in Time for a Dime!	4	Duck Tales	Cosme Quartieri, Robert Bat	Don Rosa	XU DTM 1990-2
27	1990-06	The Money Pit	12	Donald Duck	Don Rosa	Don Rosa	KD 0190
28	1990-11	The Master Landscapist	10	Donald Duck	Don Rosa	Don Rosa	D 90057
29	1991-01	On Stolen Time	13	Donald Duck	Don Rosa	Don Rosa	D 90147
30	1991-01	Treasure under Glass	20	Scooge Mcduck	Don Rosa	Don Rosa	D 90227
31	1991-03	Return to Xanadu	30	Scrooge McDuck	Don Rosa	Don Rosa	D 90314
32	1991-05	The Duck Who Fell to Earth	12	Donald Duck	Don Rosa	Don Rosa	D 90161
33	1991-08	Incident at McDuck Tower	10	Donald Duck	Don Rosa	Don Rosa	D 90345
34	1991-10	The Island at the Edge of Time	14	Scrooge McDuck	Don Rosa	Don Rosa	D 91071
35	1991-10	War of the Wendigo	27	Scrooge McDuck	Don Rosa	Don Rosa	D 91192
36	1992-01	Super Snooper Strikes Again	11	Donald Duck	Don Rosa	Don Rosa	D 91076
37	1992-08	The Last of the Clan McDuck	15	Scrooge McDuck	Don Rosa	Don Rosa	D 91308
38	1992-08	The Master of the Mississippi	28	Scrooge McDuck	Don Rosa	Don Rosa	D 91411
39	1992-11	The Buckaroo of the Badlands	15	Scrooge McDuck	Don Rosa	Don Rosa	D 92008
40	1993-01	The Raider of the Copper Hill or The King of the Copper Hill	15	Scrooge McDuck	Don Rosa	Don Rosa	D 92083
41	1993-03	The New Laird of Castle McDuck	15	Scrooge McDuck	Don Rosa	Don Rosa	D 92191
42	1993-05	The Terror of the Transvaal	12	Scrooge McDuck	Don Rosa	Don Rosa	D 92273
43	1993-06	The Dreamtime Duck of the Never-Never	15	Scrooge McDuck	Don Rosa	Don Rosa	D 92314
44	1993-07	The King of the Klondike or The Argonaut of White Agony Creek	24	Scrooge McDuck	Don Rosa	Don Rosa	D 92514
45	1993-09	Guardians of the Lost Library	28	The Junior Woodchucks	Don Rosa	Don Rosa	D 92380
46	1993-11	The Billionaire of Dismal Downs	15	Scrooge McDuck	Don Rosa	Don Rosa	D 93121
47	1994-02	From Duckburg to Lillehammer	12	Donald Duck	Don Rosa	Don Rosa	D 93287
48	1994-03	The Invader of Fort Duckburg	15	Scrooge McDuck	Don Rosa	Don Rosa	D 93227
49	1994-04	The Empire-Builder from Calisota or The Richest Duck in the World	24	Scrooge McDuck	Don Rosa	Don Rosa	D 93288
50	1994-05	The Richest Duck in the World or The Recluse of McDuck Manor	19 (16)	Scrooge McDuck	Don Rosa	Don Rosa	D 93488
51	1994-05	The Duck Who Never Was	16	Donald Duck	Don Rosa	Don Rosa	D 93574
52	1995-01	The Treasury of Croesus	24	Donald Duck	Don Rosa	Don Rosa	D 94012
53	1995-03	The Universal Solvent	24	Scrooge McDuck	Don Rosa	Don Rosa	D 94066
54	1995-06	Of Ducks, Dimes and Destinies or Of Ducks and Dimes and Destinies	15	Scrooge McDuck	Don Rosa	Don Rosa	D 91249
55	1995-09	Hearts of the Yukon	24	Scrooge McDuck	Don Rosa	Don Rosa	D 95044
56	1995-09	The Incredible Shrinking Tightwad	25 (24)	Scrooge McDuck	Don Rosa	Don Rosa	D 94202
57	1995-10	Untitled (Gyro's Beagletrap)	1	Scrooge McDuck	Don Rosa	Don Rosa	G TEM 9510
58	1995-10	The Lost Charts of Columbus	24	Donald Duck	Don Rosa	Don Rosa	D 94144
59	1996-05	The Once and Future Duck	24	Donald Duck	Don Rosa	Don Rosa	D 95079
60	1996-06	The Treasure of the Ten Avatars	28	Scrooge McDuck	Don Rosa	Don Rosa	D 95153
61	1996-08	A Matter of Some Gravity	16	Scrooge McDuck	Don Rosa	Don Rosa	D 96001
62	1996-12	The Vigilante of Pizen Bluff	24	Scrooge McDuck	Don Rosa	Don Rosa	D 96089
63	1997-05	An Eye for Detail	10	Donald Duck	Don Rosa	Don Rosa	D 94121
64	1997-06	A Little Something Special	29 (28)	Scrooge McDuck	Don Rosa	Don Rosa	D 96325
65	1997-07	Attack of the Hideous Space-Varmints or Attack of the Hideous Space Monsters	24	Scrooge McDuck	Don Rosa	Don Rosa	D 96203
66	1997-10	W.H.A.D.A.L.O.T.T.A.J.A.R.G.O.N.	16	The Junior Woodchucks	Don Rosa	Don Rosa	D 97052
67	1998	The Annual Speedskating Race of the Burg of Ducks	2	Donald Duck (not mentioned)	Don Rosa	Nils Lid Hjort	HC SKATE 8A
68	1998-01	The Sign of the Triple Distelfink	14	Donald Duck	Don Rosa	Don Rosa	D 97437
69	1998-01	The Last Lord of Eldorado	30	Scrooge McDuck	Don Rosa	Don Rosa	D 96066
70	1998-05	The Black Knight	24	Scrooge McDuck	Don Rosa	Don Rosa	D 97346
71	1998-12	The Cowboy Captain of the Cutty Sark	24	Scrooge McDuck	Don Rosa	Don Rosa	D 98045
72	1999-03	The Dutchman's Secret	24	Scrooge McDuck	Don Rosa	Don Rosa	D 98202
73	1999-07	Escape from Forbidden Valley	24	Scrooge McDuck	Don Rosa	Don Rosa	D 98346
74	1999-10	The Coin	12	Scrooge McDuck	Don Rosa	Don Rosa	F PM 99001
75	1999-11	The Quest for Kalevala	34 (33)	Scrooge McDuck	Don Rosa	Don Rosa	D 99078
76	2000-05	Attaaack!	12	Scrooge McDuck	Don Rosa	Don Rosa	F PM 00201
77	2000-09	The Three Caballeros Ride Again	28	Donald Duck	Don Rosa	Don Rosa	D 2000-002
78	2001-02	The Sharpie of the Culebra Cut	26	Scrooge McDuck	Don Rosa	Don Rosa	F PM 01201
79	2001-05	The Beagle Boys vs. the Money Bin	17	Beagle Boys	Don Rosa, Dan Shane	Don Rosa	D 2000-191
80	2001-10	The Crown of the Crusader Kings	28	Scrooge McDuck	Don Rosa	Don Rosa	D 2001-024
81	2002-03	Forget It!	13	Scrooge McDuck	Don Rosa	Don Rosa	D 2001-095
82	2002-05	Gyro's First Invention	20	Gyro Gearloose	Don Rosa	Don Rosa	D 2001-143
83	2002-12	The Dream of a Lifetime	25	Donald Duck	Don Rosa	Don Rosa	D 2002-033
84	2003-10	Trash or Treasure	13	Donald Duck	Don Rosa	Don Rosa	D 2003-017
85	2004-02	The Old Castle's Other Secret or A Letter from Home	34	Scrooge McDuck	Don Rosa	Don Rosa	D 2003-081
86	2004-06	The Black Knight Glorps Again!	26	Scrooge McDuck	Don Rosa	Don Rosa	D 2003-235
87	2004-12	The Starstruck Duck	10	Donald Duck	Don Rosa	Don Rosa	D 2004-277
88	2005-01	The Magnificent Seven (Minus 4) Caballeros	32	Donald Duck	Don Rosa	Don Rosa	D 2004-032
89	2006-05	The Prisoner of White Agony Creek	33	Scrooge McDuck	Don Rosa	Don Rosa	D 2005-061

=== Sequels to Barks' stories ===
Carl Barks' classic	Don Rosa's sequel
"Back to the Klondike"	"Last Sled to Dawson", "The Coin"
"Trail of the Unicorn"	"The Crocodile Collector"
"Lost in the Andes!"	"Return to Plain Awful"
"Tralla La", "The Lost Crown of Genghis Khan!"	"Return to Xanadu", "The Crown of the Crusader Kings", "The Old Castle's Other Secret"
"A Christmas for Shacktown", "Statuesque Spendthrifts", "The Think Box Bollix"	"Gyro's First Invention"
"The Gilded Man"	"The Last Lord of Eldorado"
"The Forbidden Valley"	"Escape from Forbidden Valley"
"The Golden Helmet"	"The Lost Charts of Columbus"
"The Trouble with Dimes"	"The Money Pit"
"Super Snooper"	"Super Snooper Strikes Again"
"Donald Duck's Atom Bomb"	"The Duck Who Fell to Earth"
"Land of the Pygmy Indians"	"War of the Wendigo"
"The Stone Ray"	"Cash Flow"
"Land Beneath the Ground!"	"The Universal Solvent", "The Black Knight", "The Black Knight Glorps Again!"
"The Fabulous Philosopher's Stone"	"The Crown of the Crusader Kings", "The Old Castle's Other Secret"

=== Continuity between Don Rosa's stories ===
These are Don Rosa's sequels to his own stories.

- See The Life and Times of Scrooge McDuck for a serial of comic book stories that chronicle the in-universe biography of Scrooge McDuck.
- "A Matter of Some Gravity", "Forget It!"
- "The Three Caballeros Ride Again", "The Magnificent Seven (Minus 4) Caballeros"
- "The Universal Solvent", "The Black Knight", "The Black Knight Glorps Again!"

== Collections ==
- The Don Rosa Library of Uncle Scrooge Adventures in Color Vols. 1–8
- The Life and Times of Scrooge McDuck
- The Life and Times of Scrooge McDuck Companion
- The Barks/Rosa Collection Vols. 1–3
- Walt Disney Treasury: Donald Duck Vols. 1, 2
- The Don Rosa Library

== See also ==
- Donald Duck in comics / Donald Duck universe
- Disney comics / Inducks (database) / Donaldism (fandom)
- List of Disney comics by Carl Barks
