= Gyro's First Invention =

- Original cover of Gyro's First Invention. Art by Don Rosa.
- Story code: D 2001-143
- Story: Don Rosa
- Ink: Don Rosa
- Date: November 2003 (US publication, US cover date December 2003)
- Hero: Gyro Gearloose
- Pages: 20
- Layout: 4 rows per page
- Appearances: Gyro Gearloose; Little Helper; Scrooge McDuck; Donald Duck; Huey, Dewey, and Louie
- First publication: Anders And & Co. #19-20; May, 2002

"Gyro's First Invention" is a Gyro Gearloose story by Don Rosa that also features Donald Duck, Scrooge McDuck, and Huey, Dewey, and Louie. It is a 50th anniversary story for the character of Gyro Gearloose, as well as a sequel to A Christmas for Shacktown (Dell One Shot #367, January 1952) by Carl Barks, and tells of the creation of Gyro's Little Helper.

Its INDUCKS story code is D 2001-143 . It first appeared in May 2002 as a two-part story in the issues #19 and #20 of Anders And & Co, a weekly published by Danish Disney licensee Egmont Group. Its first publication in its original English was in Uncle Scrooge #324, November 2003, by Gemstone Publishing.

== Plot ==
Donald tells his nephews the story about how Gyro started his business despite the fact that they were there. The story starts when Scrooge was still living with Donald and his nephews. Scrooge and Donald got into an argument which led to Scrooge breaking Donald's lamp. Donald took the lamp to get it repaired by Fulton Gearloose but unfortunately Donald finds out that Fulton has just retired and turned the shop over to his son Gyro. Gyro agrees to fix Donald's lamp, but Donald suggests that he should find a way to get Scrooge's money out of the cavern that it was stuck in.

Scrooge and Donald showed Gyro where the money was kept and explained the situation. When they went back to Gyro's shop he asked someone to turn on the light, but the lamp turned itself on. The lamp was hit by the unfinished think box that Gyro accidentally hit earlier. Gyro modified the lamp to have arms and legs and doll shoes. Donald put in a light bulb, and they created Gyro's Little Helper. Gyro's Little Helper went in the cavern and found some money. They found out how deep the cavern is and pumped up some helium gas as the money slowly went back up to the Money Bin.

Unfortunately the gas worked too well as it made the Money Bin float into the air. Little Helper used his head to break the plastic cover to let the gas out and the Money Bin wound up on the statue of Cornelius Coot. Scrooge called for some rescue plans to his Money Bin off the statue. The construction workers covered the hole with cement and gravel and the Money Bin was restored to its original location. After that Gyro and his Little Helper cleaned up Gyro's workshop. Donald let Gyro keep Little Helper alive despite the fact that it was made from his lamp. The story ends with Gyro and Little Helper trying to sell inventions as Donald finishes telling the nephews his story.

== Background ==
=== "The problem of the lost money" ===
Don Rosa is usually hesitant in using ideas that fans send him, because he knows that neither can he ever pay them for their ideas, nor is Disney ever likely to do so. "Gyro's First Invention" is special in that Rosa accepted a number of its key elements that were offered to him by Sigvald Grøsfjeld Jr., owner and maintainer of the Norwegian Rosa fansite The D.U.C.K.man. (Another notable exception is The Dream of a Lifetime! that Rosa created based on an idea by an anonymous fan from France only known by the initials F.S.M.)

In his research for his website, Grøsfjeld had come upon newsgroup exchanges between Rosa and his fans regarding "the problem of the lost money in A Christmas for Shacktown". In that classic Duck story by Carl Barks, Scrooge eventually loses all his money in a cave below his money bin, and the only access he has to it is by means of a little toy train (any other means would make the cave collapse and have Scrooge's money irretrievably fall into a reservoir of quicksand just below), bringing him a mere handful of coins and bills back on every trip in and out of the cave, which makes it clear for the characters at the end of the story that it will take Scrooge several hundreds years to regain his entire "three cubic acres of money".

However, upon Scrooge's next appearances in the one-pager Osogood Silver Polish and the long adventure story Only a Poor Old Man (both in Dell One Shot #386, March 1952) he has somehow, magically relocated all his fortunes back into the bin, a mystery for which Barks had never given an explanation.

=== Grøsfjeld's solution ===
On 11 January 1999, Grøsfjeld sent Rosa an e-mail containing his thoughts he had for a potential sequel to A Christmas for Shacktown:

"Somewhere you say that many fans and several editors for many years have asked you to do a sequel to the old Barks classic A Christmas for Shacktown (1951), where you were supposed to tell how $crooge managed to save his money from the deep pit much faster than he thought in the end of that story. [...] Anyway, I think that [...] it would be interesting to see an explanation of that mystery. If you ever decide to do that story (I know you like sequels) I have some ideas: My idea is that, the problems $crooge faces in the end of A Christmas for Shacktown cries out for a GEARLOOSE-MIRACLE. Perhaps this story thus could also show the first meeting between $crooge and Gyro? ...perhaps this could be a possible story for the first future [50th] Gyro-anniversary?" - Sigvald Grøsfjeld Jr., e-mail to Don Rosa, 11 January 1999

Rosa immediately replied to Grøsfjeld the very next day, 12 January 1999:

"That is a great story idea!!! I love it! I need to check when the first Gyro story appeared in WDC&S, but if Christmas for Shacktown predates it, that is a GREAT idea! They want me to do a Christmas story AND a sequel to that story AND they will probably ask me to do a 50th anniversary Gyro story! I am going to write this idea down *immediately*!" - Don Rosa, e-mail to Sigvald Grøsfjeld Jr., 12 January 1999

Yet another day later, Grøsfjeld had a few details worked out for Rosa:

"For some reason, Gyro [...] need[s] a little device to enter the pit the same way [...] [Huey, Dewey, and Louie]'s train did (reasons could be to get him/them samples of the soil in there, to help him/them drawing a detailed map of the situation inside the pit, or perhaps to install some other devices in there). However this little device must be able to do much more than could that train. The solution for this? A small MICROBOT created out of whatever he/they find in the workshop." - Sigvald Grøsfjeld Jr., e-mail to Don Rosa, 13 January 1999

== See also ==
- List of Disney comics by Don Rosa
