= Paul Murry =

American cartoonist

- Born: November 25, 1911 Stanberry, Missouri, U.S.
- Died: August 4, 1989 (aged 77) Palmdale, California, U.S.
- Area: Artist
- Notable works: Super Goof

Paul Murry (November 25, 1911 – August 4, 1989) was an American cartoonist and comics artist. He is best known for his Disney comics, which appeared in Dell Comics and Gold Key Comics from 1946 to 1984, particularly the Mickey Mouse and Goofy three-part adventure stories in Walt Disney's Comics and Stories.

== Biography ==
Like many Disney comic book artists, Murry started his career working at the Walt Disney Studios. During his time there he was an assistant to legendary animator Fred Moore.

Starting in 1943, Murry worked on Disney newspaper strips, beginning with several installments of the Sunday-only José Carioca strip. This was followed by a number of episodes in the 1944–1945 Panchito strip, which replaced José Carioca's, as well as some Mickey Mouse strips in 1945. Murry then provided pencil art for the Uncle Remus and His Tales of Br'er Rabbit strip from the first installment on October 14, 1945 through July 14, 1946.

After leaving the studio in 1946, he began to work for Western Publishing doing stories featuring the Disney characters. Dell Four Color No. 129 (1946) featuring three Uncle Remus stories penciled by Murry was the first comic book containing his artwork.

Murry drew many Disney characters, including Donald Duck, Uncle Scrooge, Brer Rabbit, The Sleuth, and others. The Phantom Blot and Super Goof comic books contained many Murry stories. Besides Disney, Murry also drew Woody Woodpecker comics, the 1951–1953 Buck O'Rue comic strip (written by Dick Huemer), and gag cartoons.

He is best known for his rendition of Mickey Mouse, especially the Mickey/Goofy adventure stories, mostly in Mickey Mouse, and three-part serials in Walt Disney's Comics and Stories. Murry's first published Mickey Mouse story was "Mickey Mouse and the Monster Whale," in Vacation Parade #1 (July 1950). Murry next wrote a couple of Mickey Mouse stories for Dell's One-Shots: "The Mystery of the Double-Cross Ranch" in issue #313 (February 1951) and "The Ruby Eye of Homar-Guy-Am" in #343 (August 1951).

Murry and writer Carl Fallberg began their run of Mickey Mouse and Goofy serials in Walt Disney's Comics and Stories with "The Last Resort", in issues #152–154 (May–July 1953). Murry and Fallberg continued to produce 3-part Mickey/Goofy adventures consistently from 1953 to 1962, and then occasionally from 1963 to 1972.

In 1966, at the height of popularity of the James Bond film series, Dan Spiegle provided naturalistic backgrounds and human characters while Murry drew Mickey Mouse and Goofy for the short-lived Mickey Mouse Super Secret Agent. As comic-book historian Scott Shaw notes, "What's even weirder about these stories is that in them, none of the 'real' human characters seem to notice anything remotely unusual about occupying space with a three-foot-tall talking cartoon mouse!"

When Fallberg moved on, Murry continued to draw single-part Mickey/Goofy adventures for Walt Disney's Comics and Stories and Mickey Mouse until 1984, retiring after more than 30 years of producing these stories. Murry died five years later, in 1989.

== Reprints ==
In 2018 Fantagraphics Books began publishing a hardcover series titled Disney Masters, in which Paul Murry has some of his Disney work (mainly on Mickey Mouse) reprinted.

- Mickey Mouse: The Case of the Vanishing Bandit (2018) ISBN 978-1-68396-113-0
- Mickey Mouse: The Pirates of Tabasco Bay (2019) ISBN 978-1-68396-181-9
- Mickey Mouse: The Sunken City (2020) ISBN 978-1-68396-330-1
- Mickey Mouse: New Adventures of the Phantom Blot (2021) ISBN 978-1-68396-411-7
- Mickey Mouse: The Monster of Sawtooth Mountain (2022) ISBN 978-1-68396-568- 8
- Goofy: Super Goof and the Strange Case of Dr. Syclocks (2025) ISBN 979-8-8750-0114-7

In 2019 The Library of American Comics released the fourth volume of Silly Symphonies: The Complete Disney Classics, ISBN 978-1-68405-264-6, in which the complete Silly Symphony comic strips José Carioca and Panchito, both pencilled by Murry, were included.

== Bibliography ==
The following table is a list of Murry's Mickey/Goofy adventure stories, from Walt Disney's Comics and Stories, Mickey Mouse and various specials:

Title	Issues	Dates	Writer	INDUCKS link
Mickey Mouse and the Monster Whale	Vacation Parade #1	July 1950	unknown	
The Mystery of the Double-Cross Ranch	Four-Color #313	Feb 1951	unknown	
The Ruby Eye of Homar-Guy-Am	Four-Color #343	Aug 1951	Don Christensen	
The Last Resort	WDC #152-154	May–July 1953	Carl Fallberg	
The Lens Hunters	WDC #158-160	Nov 1954-Jan 1954	Carl Fallberg	
The Case of the Vanishing Bandit	WDC #161-163	Feb-April 1954	Carl Fallberg	
The Mysterious Crystal Ball	WDC #164-166	May–July 1954	unknown	
The Lost Legion	WDC #167-169	Aug-Oct 1954	Carl Fallberg	
The Magic Rope	WDC #170-172	Nov 1954-Jan 1955	unknown	
Ridin' the Rails	WDC #173-175	Feb-April 1955	Carl Fallberg	
The Lost City	WDC #176-178	May–July 1955	Carl Fallberg	
Yesterday Ranch	WDC #179-181	Aug-Oct 1955	Carl Fallberg	
The Sign of the Squid	Mickey Mouse #44	Oct 1955	unknown	
The Big Christmas Tree Mystery	Christmas Parade #7	Nov 1955	Carl Fallberg	
The Marvelous Magnet	WDC #182-184	Nov 1955-Jan 1956	Carl Fallberg	
The Vanishing Railroad	WDC #185-187	Feb-April 1956	Carl Fallberg	
The Mystery of Diamond Mountain	Mickey Mouse #47	April 1956	Charles Beaumont & William F. Nolan	
The Case of the Hungry Ghost	WDC #188-190	May–July 1956	Carl Fallberg	
The Case of the Vanishing Bandit	Mickey Mouse #48	June 1956	Charles Beaumont & William F. Nolan	
The Pirates of Tabasco Bay	WDC #191-193	Aug-Oct 1956	Carl Fallberg	
The Giant Pearls of Aago Island	Mickey Mouse #49	August 1956	Carl Fallberg	
Double Trouble	Mickey Mouse #49	August 1956	Carl Fallberg	
The Great Stamp Hunt	WDC #194-196	Nov 1956-Jan 1957	Carl Fallberg	
The Legend of Loon Lake	WDC #197-199	Feb-April 1957	Carl Fallberg	
The Unlighted Lighthouse	Mickey Mouse #52	Feb 1957	unknown	
The Phantom Fires	WDC #200-202	May–July 1957	Carl Fallberg	
The Crystal Ball Quest	WDC #203-204	Aug-Sept 1957	Carl Fallberg	
The Sunken City	WDC #205-207	Oct-Dec 1957	Carl Fallberg	
The Mystery of Lonely Valley	WDC #208-210	Jan-March 1958	Carl Fallberg	
The Timber Treasure Trail	Mickey Mouse #58	Feb 1958	Carl Fallberg	
The Missing Money Mystery	Mickey Mouse #58	Feb 1958	Carl Fallberg	
The Bush Pilot's Peril	Mickey Mouse #59	April 1958	Carl Fallberg	
The Big Brain Baffler	Mickey Mouse #59	April 1958	Carl Fallberg	
The Castaways of Whale Bay	WDC #211-213	Apr-June 1958	Carl Fallberg	
The Idol of Moaning Island	WDC #214-216	July-Sept 1958	Carl Fallberg	
The Threat of the Stone-Eaters	WDC #217-219	Oct-Dec 1958	Carl Fallberg	
The Monster of Sawtooth Mountain	WDC #220-222	Jan-March 1959	Carl Fallberg	
The Secret of Earthquake Island	Mickey Mouse #65	April 1959	Carl Fallberg	
Alaskan Adventure	WDC #223-225	April–June 1959	Carl Fallberg	
The Secret of the Swamp	Mickey Mouse #66	June 1959	Carl Fallberg	
The Fantastic Fog	WDC #226-228	July-Sept 1959	Carl Fallberg	
The Golden Sea Shell	Donald Duck's Beach Party #6	Aug 1959	Carl Fallberg	
The Secret of Drake's Island	Mickey Mouse #67	Aug 1959	Carl Fallberg	
The Bar None Ranch	WDC #229-233	Oct 1959-Feb 1960	Floyd Gottfredson & Merrill De Maris	
Backwoods Boo-Boo	Mickey Mouse #68	Oct 1959	Carl Fallberg	
The Moose Head Mystery	Christmas Parade (Dell Giant #26)	Dec 1959	Nick George	
Pineapple Poachers	WDC #234-236	March–May 1960	Carl Fallberg	
An Education for Thursday	WDC #237-241	June-Oct 1960	Floyd Gottfredson & Merrill De Maris	
The Guest Ghost-Getters	Mickey Mouse #73	Aug 1960	Carl Fallberg	
The Trail to Treasure	WDC #242	Nov 1960	unknown	
Mickey's Strange Mission	WDC #243-245	Dec 1960-Feb 1961	Carl Fallberg	
The Floating Fortune	Mickey Mouse #76	Feb 1961	Carl Fallberg	
The Moon-Blot Plot	WDC #246-248	March–May 1961	Carl Fallberg	
Clipper Ship Caper	Mickey Mouse #77	April 1961	unknown	
The Golden Touch	WDC #249-251	June-Aug 1961	Carl Fallberg	
Backwoods Bugaboo	Mickey Mouse #78	June 1961	Carl Fallberg	
Crocodile Caper	Mickey Mouse #78	June 1961	unknown	
Blanket Bonanza	Mickey Mouse #79	Aug 1961	unknown	
The Potted Plant Plot	Mickey Mouse #79	Aug 1961	unknown	
The Great Giveaway Mystery	WDC #252-254	Sept-Nov 1961	Carl Fallberg	
All Steamed Up	Dell Giant #55	Sept 1961	Carl Fallberg	
The Catering Caper	Mickey Mouse #80	Oct 1961	unknown	
The Party Panic	Dell Giant #53	Dec 1961	unknown	
The Mystery of Misery Mesa	WDC #255-257	Dec 1961-Feb 1962	Carl Fallberg	
Arctic Roundup	Mickey Mouse #81	Dec 1961	unknown	
The Trail of the Phoenix	Mickey Mouse #82	Feb 1962	unknown	
The Unhelpful Helper	Mickey Mouse #82	Feb 1962	Carl Fallberg	
The Missing Merchantman	WDC #258-260	March–May 1962	Carl Fallberg	
Frontier Fiesta	Mickey Mouse #83	April 1962	unknown	
The Incredible Box Top Plot	WDC #261-263	June-Aug 1962	Carl Fallberg	
Lost Treasure Trackers	Mickey Mouse #84	July 1962	unknown	
The Jetboat Job	Mickey Mouse Album (One-Shot #518)	Aug 1962	Don Christensen	
The Treasure of El Dorado	WDC #264-266	Sept-Nov 1962	Carl Fallberg	
The Mysterious Mist	Christmas Parade (Gold Key) #1	Oct 1962	unknown	
A Whale of a Tale	WDC #267	Dec 1962	unknown	
Twenty Fathoms to Treasure	Mickey Mouse #86	Feb 1963	unknown	
The Priceless Dodo Bird	WDC #271	April 1963	unknown	
The Idol of Mystery Island	Mickey Mouse #87	May 1963	unknown	
Cliff Hangers	Mickey Mouse #87	May 1963	unknown	
The Secret of the Ancient Incas	WDC #274-276	July-Sept 1963	Carl Fallberg	
The Monstrous Air Serpent	Mickey Mouse #88	July 1963	unknown	
Undercover Mountie	WDC #277-279	Oct-Dec 1963	Carl Fallberg	
Strange Cargo to Pingoola	Mickey Mouse #91	Dec 1963	unknown	
One Foggy Knight	Mickey Mouse #92	Feb 1964	unknown	
The Whale Chasers	Mickey Mouse #93	April 1964	unknown	
The Missing Glink	WDC #283	April 1964	unknown	
The Return of the Phantom Blot	WDC #284-287	May-Aug 1964	unknown	
The Outlaw Trail	Mickey Mouse #94	June 1964	unknown	
The Phantom Blot Meets the Mysterious Mr. X	The Phantom Blot #1	July 1964	unknown	
The Amazing Hanjibug Jug	Mickey Mouse #96	Aug 1964	unknown	
The Bird Sitter	WDC #289	Oct 1964	unknown	
The Case of the Cankong Ruby	Mickey Mouse #97	Oct 1964	unknown	
The Phantom Ship	WDC #290-292	Nov 1964-Jan 1965	Carl Fallberg	
The Flight to Danger	Mickey Mouse #98	Dec 1964	unknown	
Using the Old Bean	Mickey Mouse #98	Dec 1964	unknown	
Robin Mickey and the Sheriff of Blottingham	Mickey Mouse #99	Feb 1965	unknown	
Medicine Man Mystery	WDC #295	April 1965	unknown	
The Phantom Blot Meets Super Goof	The Phantom Blot #2	April 1965	Del Connell	
Trapped on Wreckers Reef	WDC #296-298	May–July 1965	unknown	
The Red Wasp Mystery	WDC #317-319	Feb-April 1967	Cecil Beard	
Lair of the Zoomby	WDC #320-322	May–July 1967	unknown	
The Underwater Pirates	Mickey Mouse #112	April 1967	unknown	
Mickey Mouse Meets Blackbeard the Pirate	Mickey Mouse #114	Aug 1967	Carl Fallberg	
Trapped in Time	WDC #323-326	Aug–Nov 1967	unknown	
Lost in Atlantis	Mickey Mouse #115	Nov 1967	unknown	
Mickey Mouse and the Viking Raiders	Mickey Mouse #116	Feb 1968	Carl Fallberg	
The Case of the Dazzling Hoo-Doo	WDC #330-332	March–May 1968	Carl Fallberg	
Peril at Panther Pass	WDC #333-335	June-Aug 1968	unknown	
Twister Island	Mickey Mouse #118	Aug 1968	unknown	
The River Pirates	WDC #336-338	Sept-Nov 1968	Carl Fallberg	
The Strange Case of Professor Zero	WDC #339-341	Dec 1968-Feb 1969	unknown	
The Ski-Ghost	Mickey Mouse #120	Feb 1969	unknown	
The Secret of Shipnappers' Cove	WDC #342-344	March–May 1969	unknown	
The Mystery of the Mumbling Mountain	Mickey Mouse #121	May 1969	unknown	
The Sinking City	WDC #345-347	June-Aug 1969	unknown	
The Moose Monster Mystery	Mickey Mouse #122	Aug 1969	unknown	
Invaders from Hootowl Hollow	Mickey Mouse #123	Nov 1969	unknown	
The Sorcerer of Donnybrook Castle	WDC #351-353	Dec 1969-Feb 1970	unknown	
The Golden Moonlet	Mickey Mouse #124	Feb 1970	unknown	
Chief Bigfoot and the Ghost Warriors	WDC #354-356	March–May 1970	unknown	
The Case of the Talking Bone	Mickey Mouse #125	May 1970	unknown	
Journey to No-No Land	WDC #357-359	June-Aug 1970	unknown	
The Sign of the Scorpion	WDC #360-362	Sept-Nov 1970	unknown	
The Mystery of the Counterfeit Masters	WDC #363-365	Dec 1970-Feb 1971	unknown	
Kingdom in the Clouds	WDC #366-368	March–May 1971	unknown	
Haunted Hanadoom	WDC #373	Oct 1971	unknown	
The Pirates of Port Placid	WDC #374-376	Nov 1971-Jan 1972	Carl Fallberg	
The Golden Helmet	WDC #377-379	Feb-April 1972	unknown	
Message in a Nutshell	WDC #380-382	May–July 1972	unknown	
The Mystery Monster from Smoggy Bog	WDC #383-385	Aug-Oct 1972	unknown	
The Old Pirate's Mansion	WDC #386-388	Nov 1972-Jan 1973	unknown	
The Case of the Talking Tooth	WDC #389-391	Feb-April 1973	unknown	
Flight of the Dragon	WDC #392-394	May–July 1973	unknown	
Trail of the Golden Bell	Mickey Mouse #144	Sept 1973	unknown	
Monster Island	Mickey Mouse #149	June 1974	unknown	
A Whistle in the Dark	Mickey Mouse #150	Aug 1974	unknown	
A Helping Hand	Mickey Mouse #150	Aug 1974	unknown	
The Pelican of Smugglers' Island	Mickey Mouse #151	Sept 1974	unknown	
The Bee Bee-Havers	Mickey Mouse #151	Sept 1974	unknown	
Last of the Fire-Breathing Dragons	Mickey Mouse #152	Oct 1974	unknown	
Wrong Warpath	WDC #410	Nov 1974	unknown	
The Strange Gob O'Goop	WDC #411	Dec 1974	unknown	
Moose Call	WDC #413	Feb 1975	unknown	
Take a Giant Leap	Mickey Mouse #155	April 1975	unknown	
The Finger Genius	WDC #416	May 1975	unknown	
Rip Van Goofy	WDC #417	June 1975	unknown	
Finders Keepers	WDC #418	July 1975	unknown	
High-Sea Piracy	WDC #419	Aug 1975	unknown	
Space Treasure	Mickey Mouse #157	Aug 1975	unknown	
Secret of the Castle Tower	WDC #420	Sept 1975	unknown	
The Sea Rustlers	Mickey Mouse #160	Nov 1975	unknown	
The Sleep Creeps	WDC #422	Nov 1975	unknown	
The Snoozer	WDC #424	Jan 1976	unknown	
The Snow Queen	WDC #425	Feb 1976	unknown	
To Catch a Phantom	WDC #426	March 1976	unknown	
The Feathers of P'towwa	WDC #427	April 1976	unknown	
The Super-Duper Diamond	WDC #428	May 1976	unknown	
Turtle Triumph	WDC #429	June 1976	unknown	
The Case of the Secret Saucer	WDC #430	July 1976	unknown	
The Undercover Caper	WDC #431	Aug 1976	unknown	
Out to Launch	WDC #432	Sept 1976	unknown	
Showdown in Tumbleweed	WDC #433	Oct 1976	unknown	
The Crooked Clown Case	WDC #434	Nov 1976	Don Christensen	
The Man in the Hat	WDC #435	Dec 1976	unknown	
Gum Fight at O.K. Corral	WDC #436	Jan 1977	unknown	
Power Pin Pickle	WDC #437	Feb 1977	unknown	
The Clarabelle Caper	WDC #438	March 1977	unknown	
A Hit and Misses	WDC #439	April 1977	unknown	
Sword of Sunbeard	WDC #440	May 1977	unknown	
A Square Deal	WDC #441	June 1977	unknown	
The Ghost Noises	WDC #442	July 1977	unknown	
The Small Heist	WDC #444	Sept 1977	unknown	
Dilemma at Deep Cove	WDC #445	Oct 1977	unknown	
Mystery Mountain	WDC #446	Nov 1977	unknown	
Case of the Talented Ears	WDC #447	Dec 1977	unknown	
The Secret Key Mystery	WDC #449	Feb 1978	unknown	
A Ticklish Situation	WDC #450	March 1978	unknown	
Cave Kuhdoom	WDC #452	May 1978	unknown	
The Whirlpool Monster	WDC #453	June 1978	unknown	
Musclemania	WDC #454	July 1978	unknown	
Grocery Grabbers	WDC #455	Aug 1978	unknown	
Dude Ranch	WDC #458	Nov 1978	unknown	
No Deposit, No Return	WDC #459	Dec 1978	unknown	
Wax Museum Mystery	WDC #460	Jan 1979	unknown	
The Ghost Zoo	WDC #461	Feb 1979	unknown	
Mystery in 3-D	WDC #462	March 1979	unknown	
Desert Dilemma	WDC #464	May 1979	unknown	
Fly Guys	WDC #465	June 1979	unknown	
Smuggler's Cove Caper	WDC #466	July 1979	unknown	
Case of the Vanishing Buttons	WDC #468	Sept 1979	unknown	
Mission to Junglavia	WDC #470	Nov 1979	unknown	
The Time-Travel Trek	WDC #471	Dec 1979	unknown	
Detective Pluto	WDC #472	Jan 1980	unknown	
The Cat's Meow	WDC #474	March 1980	unknown	
The Mystery on the Mesa	WDC #475	April 1980	unknown	
The Riverboat Mystery	WDC #477	June 1980	unknown	
The Midnight Delivery	WDC #479	Aug 1980	unknown	
The Haunting Hand	WDC #482	Nov 1980	unknown	
Mission to Planet Zoa	Mickey Mouse #209	Dec 1980	unknown	
The Magic Mystery	Mickey Mouse #209	Dec 1980	unknown	
Trail of the Tumbleweed	WDC #484	Jan 1981	unknown	
Whale of a Mystery	Mickey Mouse #210	Feb 1981	unknown	
The Case of the Stone Statues	WDC #488	July 1981	unknown	
The Return of the Bat Bandit	WDC #490	Sept 1981	unknown	
The Geyser Mystery	WDC #492	Nov 1981	unknown	
The Time Trip Gyp	WDC #493	Dec 1981	unknown	
Ghost Stage	WDC #495	Feb 1982	unknown	
The Time Trek	WDC #509	1984	unknown	
The Remote Control Caper	WDC #510	1984	unknown	
