= The Three Caballeros Ride Again =

2000 Donald Duck comic book story by Don Rosa

- Story code: D 2000-002
- Story: Don Rosa
- Ink: Don Rosa
- Hero: Donald Duck
- Pages: 28
- Layout: 4 rows per page
- Appearances: Donald Duck; Huey, Dewey and Louie; José Carioca; Panchito Pistoles
- First publication: 2000

"The Three Caballeros Ride Again" is a 2000 Donald Duck comic by Don Rosa.

The story was first published in the Danish Anders And & Co. #2000-40; the first American publication was in Walt Disney's Comics and Stories #635, in August 2003.

- The Three Caballeros Ride Again served as the title story to Fantagraphics Uncle Scrooge and Donald Duck: The Don Rosa Library Vol. 9

== Plot ==
Donald Duck drives his nephews to the Junior Woodchucks jamboree in Mexico. After he drops them off, they feel sorry for Donald because he does not have any friends to spend time with.

However, José Carioca, an old friend of Donald's, is at the hotel where Donald is heading, flirting with a woman named Rosa. Her boyfriend, the bandit Alfonso Bedoya appears and tries to kill José, who jumps from the window into Donald's rumble seat. Alfonso tries to shoot them, but they escape. Donald and José, remembering the old days, decide to teach Alfonso a lesson, but Donald takes a wrong turn and they find themselves lost in the desert.

They find themselves being shot at by their old friend Panchito Pistoles, who stops when he recognizes them. Panchito explains that he found a map to the lost city of Tayopa, a silver mining city, which they find buried in lava except for the church's belfry. Because of his many treasure hunts with his rich uncle Scrooge McDuck, Donald is able to identify the church as the headquarters for the Tayopa silver mine, so the friends climb down and find wooden kegs of pure silver ingots in a secret store room. They carry it to a nearby village and put it on a train to the city of Divisadero.

While the train is being loaded with mine carts, our heroes enter a cantina where they meet Alfonso again. He was looking for Panchito because of his map. They perform a musical number, but get knocked off by Alfonso, who hijacks the train, but the caballeros use Donald's car to jump on the last flatcar. During their fight with Alfonso, the train engineer cuts them loose and they are on a runaway train on the world's most dangerous railroad track. Alfonso falls from the train right into the jail.

The caballeros derail the silver kegs' flatcar and escape to Copper Canyon in Donald's car. However, they find out that the substance in the kegs is not silver after all, but mercury used to extract silver from ore. There is no silver remaining, but instead of feeling disappointed, the three caballeros share a hearty laugh, agreeing that they have had a great adventure, and the fact that there is no reward at the end just makes it a better story.

They ride back to the hotel in Divisadero, where the owner is threatening to fire José unless he comes up with a very special performance.

After departing the jamboree, Huey, Dewey, and Louie return to the hotel and observe the Three Caballeros performing their theme song on stage on Panchito's horse to strong audience applause. Following the performance, José and Panchito praise Donald Duck to the boys, describing him as a loyal friend and commending his commitment to raising his three nephews.

== See also ==
- The Magnificent Seven (Minus 4) Caballeros
