= Disney Masters =

Comic book collection

Publication information
- Publisher: Fantagraphics
- Format: Hardcover
- Genre: Anthropomorphic animals Adventure
- Publication date: May 2018
- Main character(s): Mickey Mouse, Donald Duck, Uncle Scrooge, Goofy

Creative team
- Written by: various
- Artist: various
- Editor(s): Michael Catron, David Gerstein

Disney Masters is a series of books collecting stories from a variety of Disney characters. Italian artist Romano Scarpa was the first featured creator in the series, in the volume titled The Delta Dimension. The publisher behind the project is Fantagraphics. The first book of the series was released in May 2018.

== Format ==
Each book in the series is hardcover with dimensions measuring 7.5 inches × 10.25 inches, (191 mm × 260 mm). Each volume is printed in full color and contains about 200 pages. Supplementary materials such as art, biographies of the artists, and essays are included as well. The MSRP for each single volume is set at $29.99 for volumes collecting around 200 pages and $34.99 for volumes collecting near 250 pages.

While the volumes are titled with one central figure, some volumes also include stories from a secondary main character.

Volumes of the series are primarily sold separately and in boxed sets, but the first five volumes are also available for purchase as a set via a subscription from the publisher. The release schedule for the series is five volumes a year, starting in May 2018. There are two types of boxed collections; one type collecting the volumes in chronological release order, and the other collecting volumes by the books' main character.

== Volumes and box sets ==
Volumes
| Vol. | Release date | Title Figure | Title | Artist(s) | Featured stories with INDUCKS links | Period | Page count | ISBN | INDUCKS link |
|---|---|---|---|---|---|---|---|---|---|
| 1 | 2018-05-09 | Mickey Mouse | The Delta Dimension | Romano Scarpa | Mickey Mouse in the Delta Dimension , The Bleep-Bleep 15 , The Fabulous City of Shan-Grilla | 1959-1961 | 208 | 978-1-68396-096-6 | DM 1 |
| 2 | 2018-06-05 | Donald Duck | Uncle Scrooge's Money Rocket | Luciano Bottaro | Uncle Scrooge's Money Rocket , The Return of Rebo , TV Trickery | 1960-1995 | 192 | 978-1-68396-109-3 | DM 2 |
| 3 | 2018-07-03 | Mickey Mouse | The Case of the Vanishing Bandit | Paul Murry | The Last Resort , The Lens Hunters , The Case of the Vanishing Bandit , The Mysterious Crystal Ball , The Lost Legion , The Magic Rope , Ridin' the Rails | 1953-1955 | 184 | 978-1-68396-113-0 | DM 3 |
| 4 | 2018-08-07 | Donald Duck | The Great Survival Test | Daan Jippes & Freddy Milton | The Great Survival Test , The Success Test , A Clean Case of Competence , The Do-Gooders' League , Donald's Happy Birthday , Copious Quantities of Cod Liver Oil , Disco-Ducks , Haste Makes Waste , Allworth and No Play , Going to Sea , Rewarding Formula , Sauce for the Duck , Arrested Development , Coat of Harms , The Right Man on the Wrong Spot , Scooting to Success , Bet You Didn't , The Briefcase Case | 1976-1982 | 192 | 978-1-68396-111-6 | DM 4 |
| 5 | 2018-10-09 | Mickey Mouse | The Phantom Blot's Double Mystery | Romano Scarpa | The Phantom Blot's Double Mystery , The Last Balaboo , The Eternal Flame of Kalhoa | 1955-1961 | 187 | 978-1-68396-136-9 | DM 5 |
| 6 | 2019-02-12 | Uncle Scrooge | King of the Golden River | Giovan Battista Carpi | King of the Golden River , Mickey the Kid and Six-Shot Goofy! , Me, Myself, and Why | 1961-1974 | 190 | 978-1-68396-170-3 | DM 6 |
| 7 | 2019-03-12 | Mickey Mouse | The Pirates of Tabasco Bay | Paul Murry | The Lost City , Yesterday Ranch , Mickey Mouse and the Marvelous Magnet , The Vanishing Railroad , The Case of the Hungry Ghost , The Pirates of Tabasco Bay , The Great Stamp Hunt | 1955-1956 | 184 | 978-1-68396-181-9 | DM 7 |
| 8 | 2019-06-18 | Donald Duck | Duck Avenger Strikes Again! | Romano Scarpa | Duck Avenger Strikes Again , Ellsworth's Ornery Orphan , Captured in Bananaland | 1971-1976 | 184 | 978-1-68396-197-0 | DM 8 |
| 9 | 2019-08-14 | Mickey Mouse | The Ice Sword Saga: Book 1 | Massimo De Vita | The Sword of Ice , The Tournament of Argaar | 1982-1983 | 189 | 978-1-68396-198-7 | DM 9 |
| 10 | 2020-04-15 | Donald Duck | Scandal on the Epoch Express | Bas Heymans & Mau Heymans | Scandal on the Epoch Express , Big Brain Blowout , Scent-imental Romeos , Winifred's Revenge , Don Quiduck de la Mancha , Nothin' Beats the Classics , Healers of the Andes! , The Daisy Chain , Trapdoor Trick , Regulationary War , Forty-Wink Zeke , Bargain Battle! , The Laurels of Julius Pecunius , Over Easy , Daisy Duck's Diatribe! , Family Feud , Dieu Dieu Duck | 1988-2015 | 192 | 978-1-68396-249-6 | DM 10 |
| 11 | 2020-06-09 | Mickey Mouse | The Ice Sword Saga: Book 2 | Massimo De Vita | The Prince of Mists Strikes Back , The Sleeping Beauty in the Stars! , The Secret of 313 , Arizona Goof and the Tiger's Fiery Eye | 1984-2008 | 192 | 978-1-68396-250-2 | DM 11 |
| 12 | 2020-10-20 | Donald Duck | The Forgetful Hero | Giorgio Cavazzano | Plantastic Voyage , The Dazzling Duck She-Venger , The Case of the Cut-Off Calls! , The Forgetful Hero | 1973-1991 | 200 | 978-1-68396-312-7 | DM 12 |
| 13 | 2020-11-03 | Mickey Mouse | The Sunken City | Paul Murry | The Sunken City , Legend of Loon Lake , The Phantom Fires , The Crystal Ball Quest , The Mystery of Lonely Valley , The Castaways of Whale Bay , The Idol of Moaning Island | 1957-1958 | 176 | 978-1-68396-330-1 | DM 13 |
| 14 | 2020-11-17 | Donald Duck | Follow the Fearless Leader | Al Hubbard | The Health Nut , Weaving and Ducking , The Big Dig , It's Music? , Haste Makes Waste , The Case of the Purloined Pearls , The Frontiersman , Time to Duck , The Blackboard Bungle , Pop Goes the Art , The Whopper Stopper , It's Magic , Follow the Fearless Leader , Must the Show Go On? , Jumping Pup , A Hutch Is Not a Home , The Big Cabbage Field in the Sky , The Heck Ship , The Cat Caper , Hot and Cold Running Ducks , Put It On the Diners , Ditch Day , The Retriever | 1958-1973 | 196 | 978-1-68396-362-2 | DM 14 |
| 15 | 2021-02-09 | Mickey Mouse | New Adventures of the Phantom Blot | Paul Murry | The Phantom Blot Meets the Mysterious Mr. X , The Phantom Blot Meets Super Goof , Oh, What a Tangled Rope We Wield! , Culprits, Inc. , Safe Surprise , The Phantom Blot Meets Madam Mim , Me and My Shadow-Boxing , Hi-Yo, Beagle! Away! , The Crown of Tabash , Tough Old Bird , Dogged Pursuit , Secret Sea Raider , Blotless Blot , Blotsa Laughs , The Case of the Disappearing Diamonds , By a Waterfall , Stairways to Seeing-Stars | 1964-1966 | 252 | 978-1-68396-411-7 | DM 15 |
| 16 | 2021-05-04 | Donald Duck | Jumpin' Jupiter! | Luciano Bottaro | Fear the Wrath of Rebo! , Jumpin' Jupiter! , The Washed-Up Witch , Voyage to the Bottom of the Hole | 1960-2007 | 180 | 978-1-68396-414-8 | DM 16 |
| 17 | 2021-07-20 | Mickey Mouse | The Man from Altacraz | Romano Scarpa | The Man from Altacraz , Risky Bees-Ness , Kali's Nail , The African Queen | 1958-1983 | 188 | 978-1-68396-428-5 | DM 17 |
| 18 | 2021-09-14 | Uncle Scrooge | Pie in the Sky | William Van Horn | Pie in the Sky , A Prickly Relation , Tightrope Gag , A Sound Deal , Fly Now - Pay Later , Dime Collector , Backyard Bet , Floating Alone , Large Deduction , Tents, Anyone? , Lost On a Dog , His Money's Worth , Poisoned Palate , The Bright Side , Shaping Up , Heavy Duty , Duel Personalities , The Three Bs , Seafood Blues , Quick Trim , Tree's a Crowd , Be My Gust , Shooting to the Top , False Economy , Another Vine Mess , Call Off the Wild , The Amazon Queen , Rootin', Tootin' Duck , Beachhead Bathos , The Bees Have It! , Snore Losers , It's Bats, Man! | 1988-1990 | 200 | 978-1-68396-441-4 | DM 18 |
| 19 | 2022-05-24 | Mickey Mouse | Trapped in the Shadow Dimension | Casty | Trapped in the Shadow Dimension , The Terrible, Terrible Triple-Dimensional Beagle Boy , The World To Come | 2008-2014 | 192 | 978-1-68396-448-3 | DM 19 |
| 20 | 2022-08-16 | Donald Duck | 20.000 Leaks Under the Sea | Al Hubbard | It's Only Money , Mountain Magic , Do It Yourself , The Missing Hair , Matador-to-Door Salesman , Flock Together , Bah Wilderness , Water Sports , The Contest , Out of the Depths of Despair , Vet Day , Suds in Your Eye , The Piggy Bank , The Case of the Renegade Circus , The Superior Intellect , Old Trusty's Scent , A Midsummer's Nightmare , 20.000 Leaks Under the Sea , Satisfied Customer , A Goofy Look at the Newspaper , The Bouncing Ball , The Carpet Baggers , The Pioneer , Fall Guy , Chased Chaser , Law Trouble , There's No Place Like Home | 1950-1965+ 1973 | 188 | 978-1-68396-567-1 | DM 20 |
| 21 | 2022-10-25 | Mickey Mouse | The Monster of Sawtooth Mountain | Paul Murry | The Fantastic Fog , The Threat of the Stone-Eaters , The Monster of Sawtooth Mountain , Alaskan Adventure , Pineapple Poachers , The Trail to Treasure , Mickey's Strange Mission , The Moon-Blot Plot | 1958-1961 | 184 | 978-1-68396-568-8 | DM 21 |
| 22 | 2023-06-06 | Uncle Scrooge | Operation Galleon Grab | Giorgio Cavazzano | Operation Galleon Grab , The Snacking Sleuths , Brother From Another Earth , Here Today, Gone Apollo , There's No Fool Like an Old Fool | 1973-1995 | 192 | 978-1-68396-764-4 | DM 22 |
| 23 | 2024-03-26 | Mickey Mouse | The Riddle of Brigaboom | Romano Scarpa | The Riddle of Brigaboom , Remotely Impossible , The Unsinkable Kildare Coot , The Famed Jumping Frog of Queen Zenobia | 1964-2000 | 192 | 978-1-68396-880-1 | DM 23 |
| 24 | 2024-05-21 | Uncle Scrooge | World Wide Witch | Daniel Branca | The Green Attack , The Quest for the Curious Constable, An Honest Mistake , Tip-Top Topiary , Con Job For a Snob , Ill Met by Moonlight , That's... Entertainment?! , Feline Fellini , The Hi-Tech, Low-Down Blues , Two in One , What About 65? , World Wide Witch , The Flying Mallard , In Quest of the Green Hope , The Croc Stopper | 1979-2003 | 204 | 978-1-68396-466-7 | DM 24 |
| 25 | 2024-08-27 | Mickey Mouse | The River of Time | Corrado Mastantuono | The River of Time , Boomer Buff's Big Boost , The Explorers of Tomorrow , Mouse in the Mirror , Once Upon a Pastry , | 1997-2013 | 190 | 978-1-68396-940-2 | DM 25 |
| 26 | 2025-09-30 | Donald Duck | Tales of Andold Wild Duck | Marco Rota | Big Little Bo , The Nightmare Ship , Saved by the Smell! , Night of the Saracen , The Runestone's Curse , Commuter Crisis , In Love and War | 1975-2007 | 208 | 979-8-8750-0044-7 | DM 26 |
| 27 | 2025-10-07 | Goofy | Super Goof and the Strange Case of Dr. Syclocks | Paul Murry | All's Well That Ends Awful , The Thief of Zanzipar , The Vanishing Zoo , Bullet-Proof Goof , Rarin' to Go , The Strange Case of Doctor Syclocks , Big Game , Knotty Problem , The Giant Windoola Jade , The Big Bib's Secret , Super-Blown Candles , Super Goof Meets Super Thief , Shockproof Watch , Reeling-In a Big One , The Twister Resisters , Super Goof Vs. the Cold Ray , A Clean Sweep , The Rocket Robbers , The Paste-Up Job , Mighty Mover , Paper Peril , The Case of the Flying Umbrella , The Spray Can Caper , The Misfit Matador , The Secret Key Mystery | 1965-1978 | 242 | 979-8-8750-0114-7 | DM 27 |
| 28 | 2026-08-04 | Uncle Scrooge | No Room for Human Error | William Van Horn | TBA | TBA | TBA | 979-8-8750-0220-5 | |

=== Box sets ===
Collector's Box Sets
| Vol. | Release date | Title Figure | Title | Artist(s) | Volumes | ISBN |
|---|---|---|---|---|---|---|
| 1 | 2018-10-09 | Mickey Mouse, Donald Duck | Volumes One and Two | Romano Scarpa, Luciano Bottaro | 1 & 2 | 978-1-68396-151-2 |
| 2 | 2018-10-09 | Mickey Mouse, Donald Duck | Volumes Three and Four | Paul Murry, Daan Jippes, Freddy Milton | 3 & 4 | 978-1-68396-152-9 |
| 3 | 2019-10-01 | Mickey Mouse, Uncle Scrooge | Volumes Five and Six | Romano Scarpa, Giovan Battista Carpi | 5 & 6 | 978-1-68396-268-7 |
| 4 | 2019-10-01 | Mickey Mouse, Donald Duck | Volumes Seven and Eight | Paul Murry, Romano Scarpa | 7 & 8 | 978-1-68396-269-4 |
| 5 | 2020-10-27 | Mickey Mouse, Donald Duck | Volumes Nine and Ten | Massimo De Vita, Mau Heymans & Bas Heymans | 9 & 10 | 978-1-68396-360-8 |
| 6 | 2020-10-27 | Mickey Mouse, Donald Duck | Volumes Eleven and Twelve | Massimo De Vita, Giorgio Cavazzano | 11 & 12 | 978-1-68396-361-5 |
| 7 | 2022-11-15 | Mickey Mouse, Donald Duck | Volumes Thirteen and Fourteen | Paul Murry, Al Hubbard | 13 & 14 | 978-1-68396-251-9 |
| 8 | 2022-11-15 | Mickey Mouse, Donald Duck | Volumes Fifteen and Sixteen | Paul Murry, Luciano Bottaro | 15 & 16 | 978-1-68396-665-4 |
| 9 | 2023-09-26 | Mickey Mouse, Donald Duck | Volumes Seventeen and Eightteen | Romano Scarpa, William Van Horn | 17 & 18 | 978-1-68396-875-7 |
| 10 | 2023-09-26 | Mickey Mouse, Donald Duck | Volumes Nineteen and Twenty | Andrea “Casty” Castellan, Al Hubbard | 19 & 20 | 978-1-68396-876-4 |
| 11 | 2024-09-10 | Mickey Mouse, Uncle Scrooge | Volumes Twenty-one and Twenty-two | Paul Murry, Giorgio Cavazzano | 21 & 22 | 978-1-68396-991-4 |

Gift Box Sets
| Vol. | Release date | Title Figure | Title | Artist(s) | Volumes | ISBN |
|---|---|---|---|---|---|---|
| 1 | 2018-10-09 | Mickey Mouse | Disney Masters Box Set 1 | Romano Scarpa, Paul Murry | 1 & 3 | 978-1-68396-153-6 |
| 2 | 2018-10-09 | Donald Duck | Disney Masters Box Set 2 | Luciano Bottaro, Daan Jippes, Freddy Milton | 2 & 4 | 978-1-68396-154-3 |

== Related ==
Free Comic Book Day 2020

In December 2019 it was announced that Fantagraphics was going to be participating in the promotion campaign Free Comic Book Day on May 2, 2020; with an issue showcasing their Disney Masters series. The free comic book released for the promotion would be titled Disney Masters: Donald Duck, and would feature reprints of the stories: "It's Bats Man" starring Donald Duck by William Van Horn, "The Health Nut" by Dick Kinney and Al Hubbard, which is the story that introduced Fethry Duck into the duck universe, and a story with Scrooge McDuck, "Much Ado About Telepathy" by Evert Geradts and Mau Heymans.

Due to the 2020 pandemic the Free Comic Book Day event was postponed and changed from its regular one day-event in May to be a Summer event taking place over several weeks from July to September. Fantagraphics Books' Disney Masters FCBD issue was released August 19, 2020.

Free Comic Book Day 2022

For FCBD of 2022 Fantagraphics released a new free issue, with once again the title, Disney Masters: Donald Duck; this time featuring: The Scrooge McDuck tale "Snore Losers" by William Van Horn, the Super Goof adventure "Here Today, Gone Apollo" by Giorgio Cavazzano and the Fethry Duck story "Fall Guy" written by Dick Kinney with art by Al Hubbard.

== See also ==
- Walt Disney's Mickey Mouse
