= Panchito Pistoles =

Disney animation and comics character

- Mickey Mouse & Friends and Donald Duck character
- First appearance: The Three Caballeros (1944)
- Created by: Ernesto Terrazas; Fred Moore
- Voiced by: Joaquin Garay (original); Carlos Alazraqui (2001–present); Rob Paulsen (singing voice in House of Mouse episode “Not so Goofy”); Jaime Camil (Legend of the Three Caballeros); Arturo Del Puerto (DuckTales)

In-universe information
- Aliases: Panchito; Panchito Romero Miguel Junipero Francisco Quintero González III (House of Mouse); Panchito Romero Miguel Francisco Quintero González III (Legend of the Three Caballeros); Pancho el Charro
- Species: Rooster
- Gender: Male
- Affiliation: José Carioca & Donald Duck
- Significant other: Clara Cluck
- Relatives: Miguel González (father); Maria Morales (mother); Roberto González (paternal grandfather); Raquel González (paternal grandmother); Michelle Alaez (paternal great aunt); Jose Morales (maternal grandfather); Sofia Morales (maternal grandmother); Junipero Morales (maternal uncle); Romero (miscellaneous cousin); Gallus Maximus (ancestor)
- Nationality: Mexican

Panchito Pistolas is a cartoon anthropomorphic rooster created by Fred Moore. He first appeared in the 1944 Disney film The Three Caballeros with his friends Donald Duck and José Carioca. He later appeared in several Disney comics, including a year-long run in the Silly Symphony Sunday comic strip (1944–1945) as well as Don Rosa's comic book stories The Three Caballeros Ride Again (2000) and The Magnificent Seven (Minus 4) Caballeros (2005). He speaks Spanish with a Mexican accent.

== Description ==
Panchito is a friend of Donald Duck and José Carioca. He lives in Mexico and rides on a horse called Señor Martinez. He had some appearances in the television series House of Mouse and in Minnie's Bow-Toons as a MC for a Mexican Fiesta. His first appearance in comics was a self-titled 1943 story in which he met and fell for Clara Cluck. A few months earlier he appeared in a text story titled "La Piñata".

From 1944, Panchito headlined a year-long sequence in the Silly Symphony Sunday comic strip, written by Bill Walsh, with pencils by Paul Murry and inks by Dick Moores.

Panchito's full name is Panchito Romero Miguel Junipero Francisco Quintero González III. Panchito is a nickname for Francisco, which is also his fifth name. The unusually long name is a joking reference to the fact that, in many Spanish speaking countries, people use two surnames (which in some cases are composed of two or more words) and commonly have one or more middle names. This full name was mostly maintained in Legend of the Three Caballeros, only dropping Junipero from his name.

As there is no reference to his surname "Pistoles", some people assume that it is another nickname. The word "Pistoles" does not exist in Spanish, although "Pistolas" would mean guns, specifically handguns or pistols. As a matter of fact, the character is known as "Panchito Pistolas" in the Spanish market.

== Señor Martinez ==
Señor Martinez is the anthropomorphic horse of Panchito Pistoles. Señor Martinez first appeared in a 1944 newspaper strip, written by Bill Walsh and drawn by Paul Murry. Recently the horse made appearances in "The Three Caballeros Ride Again" and "The Magnificent Seven (Minus Four) Caballeros", both stories written and drawn by Don Rosa. However, Don Rosa chose to draw Señor Martinez as a 'realistic' horse, instead of sticking with his more cartoonish original appearance.

== Disney theme parks appearances ==
The merchandise location at Disney's Coronado Springs Resort at Walt Disney World is named Panchito's Gifts and Sundries, and features Panchito's likeness on its sign.

In April 2007, Walt Disney World re-introduced Panchito (along with the second Caballero, José Carioca), in the newly revamped ride at Epcot's Mexico Pavilion with entirely new animation and a new storyline. It has been dubbed "The Gran Fiesta Tour". In the storyline, the reunited Three Caballeros are set to play a show in Mexico City. Donald Duck goes missing, and José and Panchito must search throughout Mexico for Donald as he takes in various sights around Mexico. The animation was apparently directed by Eric Goldberg.

Panchito can also be seen in the Hong Kong Disneyland version of It's a Small World, which opened on April 28, 2008, as well as the Disneyland (in California) version of It's a Small World, installed during major refurbishments between January and November 2008, also as the Tokyo Disneyland version of It's a Small World, installed during major refurbishments between March 2017 and April 2018.

José and Panchito's costumes were extinct at the Disneyland Resort by 2011, but were re-Imagineered for Mickey's Soundsational Parade. They now appear daily with Donald Duck and dancers with a float where Donald is trying to hit a Pinata.

In late 2012, Panchito appears with José and Donald in Disney California Adventure's ¡Viva Navidad! celebration for the holiday seasons.

== Aircraft representations ==
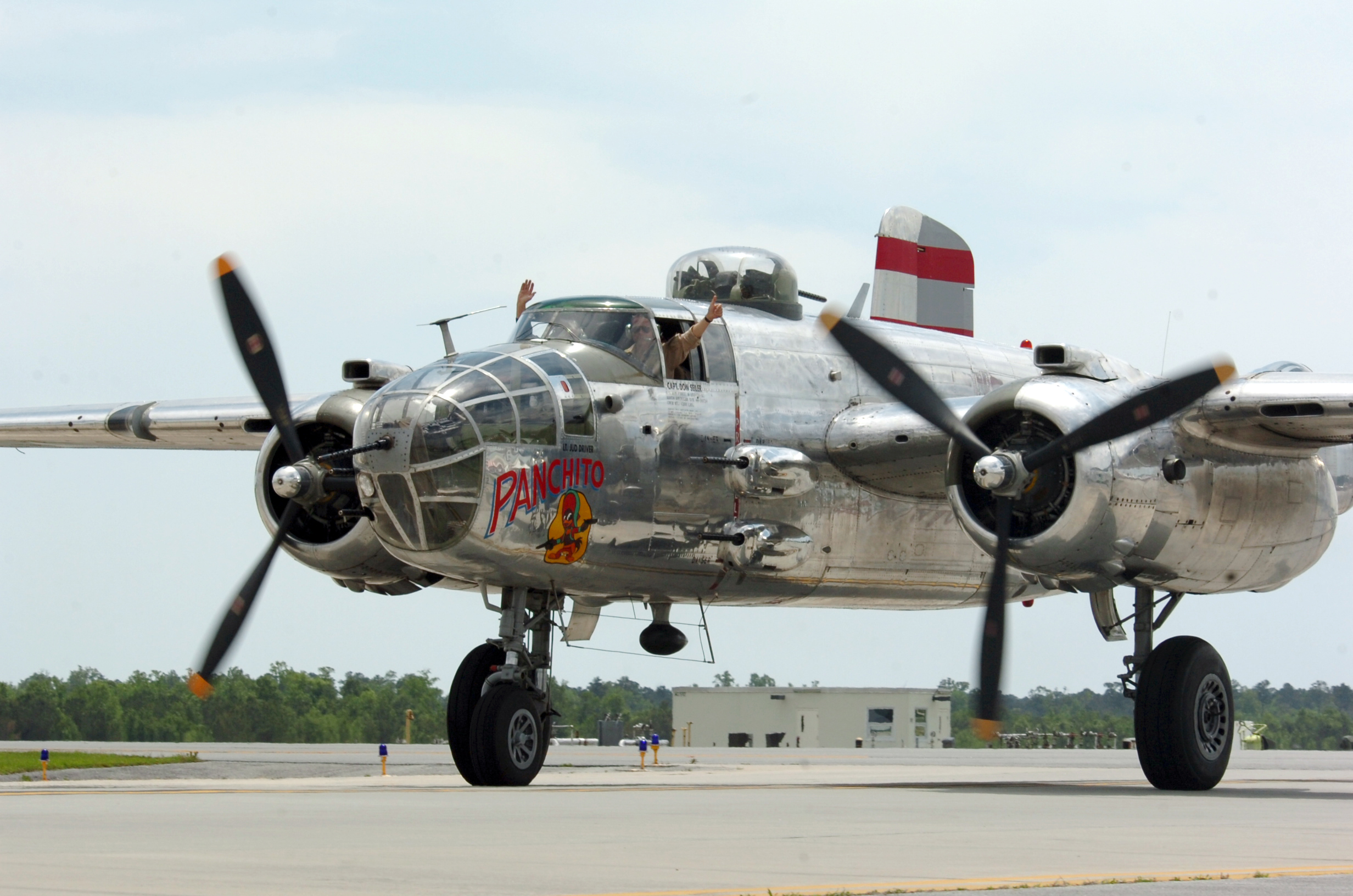
Present-day B-25J with Panchito nose art

During World War II, Escuadrón 201 of the Mexican Expeditionary Air Force used Panchito Pistoles as its unofficial emblem.

The United States Army Air Forces (USAAF) operated a North American B-25J Mitchell, serial number 43-28147, which was named Panchito and decorated with the likeness of Panchito Pistoles as her nose art. She operated with the 41st Bombardment Group in the Pacific theater from October 1944 until the Japanese surrender in August 1945 and was eventually scrapped in 1949.

The Swedish Air Force had a North American P-51 Mustang decorated with Panchito. The P-51, serial number 26009 and named Röd Erik ("Red Erik"), belonged to the 163. jaktflygdivisionen ("163rd Fighter Division"), the 3rd division of the 16th Wing at Ärna Air Base near Uppsala. The decoration was painted in 1946 by Sture Mattsson.

Today, another B-25J Mitchell, serial number 44-30734, flies as a replica of the original Panchito. Delivered in February 1945, she operated with the USAAF and its successor the U.S. Air Force until being sold into civilian service in 1959. She was restored to military configuration in 1986 and has been operated as a warbird at airshows ever since then.

== In other media ==
- Panchito made guest appearances in House of Mouse, voiced by Carlos Alazraqui. He and José appear in major roles in the episodes "The Three Caballeros" and "Not So Goofy", while in other episodes they are also seen sitting among the club's audience.
- Panchito appears alongside José in the Mickey Mouse Mixed-Up Adventures episodes "Mickey's Perfector Day!" and "Super-Charged: Daisy's Grande Goal", reprised by Carlos Alazraqui.
- Panchito and the Three Caballeros make an appearance in the Mickey Mouse episode "¡Feliz Cumpleaños!" as performers at Mickey's birthday.
- Panchito appears as one of the main characters in the Legend of the Three Caballeros animated series. He is voiced by Jaime Camil. For this incarnation, he does not use pistols and is credited as "Panchito Gonzalez".
- Panchito appears alongside the other Caballeros in the 2017 DuckTales series, voiced by Arturo Del Puerto. He appears in the episode "The Town Where Everyone Was Nice!", which explains that he, José and Donald performed in a band called "The Three Caballeros" in college, reuniting years later as adults. He returned in the third-season episode, "Louie's Eleven!" to increase the Caballeros' popularity, and makes a cameo in the series finale, "The Last Adventure!"
- Panchito also has a cameo appearance in the 2023 short film Once Upon a Studio, as part of the Walt Disney Animation Studios characters that take a group photo.
- Panchito appears alongside José in the Mickey Mouse Funhouse episode "Día de Muertos", reprised by Carlos Alazraqui.
