= Romano Scarpa =

Italian animator and comic book writer

- Scarpa at an Exposition in Rome in 2000
- Born: 27 September 1927 Venice, Italy
- Died: 23 April 2005 (aged 77) Málaga, Spain
- Areas: Artist, Writer

Romano Scarpa (27 September 1927 – 23 April 2005) was one of the most famous Italian creators of Disney comics.

== Biography ==
Growing up in Venice he developed a particular love for American cartoons and Disney comics, that, at the time, were published in the big format of the Topolino giornale which was then printing now classic Floyd Gottfredson's stories. In the 1940s he opened an Animation Studio in Venice in which he produced his first works: some commercials, a short titled E poi venne il diluvio and another one titled La piccola fiammiferaia (1953, based on Hans Christian Andersen's The Little Match Girl), distributed in Italy together with Robert Aldrich's Attack! (1956).

Right after that he stopped working in animation for a while and dedicated wholly to creating Disney comics. When in 1956 Italian editors had no more new Floyd Gottfredson's stories to reprint, he was given the responsibility to continue Gottfredson's stories about Mickey Mouse. Also influenced by Carl Barks in the late 1950s and up to about 1963 he wrote and penciled stories like Topolino e la collana Chirikawa (1960) or The Flying Scot (1957) that have, later, been translated in many different languages throughout the world. Many of these stories have their backgrounds in movies, for example Topolino nel favoloso regno di Shan Grillà (1961) is based upon Frank Capra's Lost Horizon (1937); not to talk about all the stories starring Snow White or the Seven Dwarfs, obviously based on Snow White and the Seven Dwarfs (1937). Sometimes the exact opposite happened; the Italian movie Riusciranno i nostri eroi a ritrovare l'amico misteriosamente scomparso in Africa? (1968) is based on Scarpa's story Topolino e il Pippotarzan (1957).

Around 1963, Scarpa stopped writing for 6 or 7 years. In the 1970s, he moved to Spain and started working for a different publisher. Among the last things he made while he was still in Italy, at the end of the 1980s and at beginning of the 1990s, there are the so-called Paperolimpiadi (a long story about the 1988 Seoul Olympic games) and some strip stories, the same kind of stories that he loved when he was a child. One of these, Topolino e l'enigma di Brigaboom (1989) was partially based on Brigadoon (1954).

He subsequently contributed to Aihnoo degli Icebergs (1972), The Fourth King (1977) and a TV series, The Adventures of Marco and Gina (Sopra i tetti di Venezia) (2001).

Scarpa mainly worked on Disney comics, but he was also able to work on non-Disney material once in a while, so he did one (Rolf Kauka's) Lupo story and one (Hanna and Barbera's) Yogi Bear story. In the 1950s he also drew some Angelino stories, and Italian character.

Since 1988 some of his comic stories have been published in the US by Gladstone Publishing; it was the first time that this happened to an Italian Disney author. Later, when Disney Comics took Gladstone's place; they published some more of his stories, and in 2003, the same happened with Gemstone Publishing. He has influenced many younger creators (Giorgio Cavazzano was his inker during the Sixties) and many have attempted to imitate his style.

== Disney characters created by Romano Scarpa ==
In his career Scarpa created many Disney characters that are now accepted by some as part of the Disney Universe. Those include, but are not limited to:

- Atomo Bleep-Bleep, a humanized atom created by Doctor Einmug, and uses supernatural abilities;
- Brigitta MacBridge, Scrooge McDuck's self-appointed girlfriend with whom she shares a love/hate relationship;
- Ellroy (Italian: Bruto), Ellsworth's adopted son;
- Dickie Duck (Italian: Paperetta Yé-Yé), a dynamic female teenage duck who was introduced as the granddaughter of "Glittering" Goldie O'Gilt;
- Gideon McDuck (Italian: Gedeone de' Paperoni), a newspaper editor and Scrooge's brother;
- Jubal Pomp (Italian: Filo Sganga), an unlucky wanna-be businessman always trying to imitate Scrooge and failing miserably;
- Kildare Coot (Italian: Sgrizzo Papero), a crazy cousin of Donald Duck's;
- Portis (Italian: Plottigat), Black Pete's cousin, a genius of crime;
- Trudy Van Tubb, Black Pete's mate and accomplice in crime;
- Zenobia, a ruler of an African state, and girlfriend of Goofy.

== Reprints ==
In 2017 Fantagraphics Books published a collection containing four stories of Scarpa's Snow White comics, titled The Return of Snow-White and the Seven Dwarfs, ISBN 978-1-68396-075-1.

In 2018 Fantagraphics Books began publishing a hardcover series titled Disney Masters, in which Romano Scarpa has to date (December 2024) had five volumes dedicated to his Disney works.

- Mickey Mouse: The Delta Dimension (2018) ISBN 978-1-68396-096-6
- Mickey Mouse: The Phantom Blot's Double Mystery (2018) ISBN 978-1-68396-136-9
- Donald Duck: Duck Avenger Strikes Again (2019) ISBN 978-1-68396-197-0
- Mickey Mouse: The Man from Altacraz (2021) ISBN 978-1-68396-428-5
- Mickey Mouse: The Riddle of Brigaboom (2024) ISBN 978-1-68396-880-1

== Index of comics books published in the United States ==
This is an index of all Romano Scarpa comics published in the US. Only Duck universe and Mouse universe are listed. Chip and Dale comics are not listed.

Story code	Hero	Title	Publications	Year	Pages	Trivia
I TL 116-A	Mickey Mouse	"The Blot's Double Mystery"	Mickey and Donald #6	1988	76	Serialized in volumes 7 and 8
I TL 135-A	Donald Duck	"Amundsen's Talisman"	Donald Duck #279	1990	33
I AT 21-A	Uncle Scrooge	"The McDuck Foundation"	Uncle Scrooge #241	1990	25
I TL 243-A	Uncle Scrooge	"The last Balaboo"	Uncle Scrooge #242	1990	35	Brigitta MacBridge's first appearance
I TL 183-A	Mickey Mouse	"Kali's Nail"	Mickey Mouse #254	1990	50	serialized in volume 255
I TL 142-A	Mickey Mouse	"The Mystery of Tapiocus VI"	Mickey Mouse #256	1990	53
S 88227	Mickey and Goofy	"TV Troubles"	Mickey Mouse Adventures #16	1991	9	Reprinted in Disney's Colossal Comics Collection 7
S 86081	Huey Dewey and Louie	"Delay of the Land"	Donald Duck Adventures #22	1992	10	Published as Donald story
E GN 92-03	Uncle Scrooge	"The Euro Disneyland Adventure"	Disney's Colossal Comics Collection 9	1993	44	Done for France
I TL 216-B	Uncle Scrooge	"The Man from Oola-Oola"	Uncle Scrooge Adventures #28–29	1994	37
I TL 250-A	Uncle Scrooge	"The Lentils from Babylon"	Uncle Scrooge Adventures #30	1995	71	Serialized in volumes 31 and 32
I TL 292-A	Uncle Scrooge	"Colossus of the Nile"	Uncle Scrooge Adventures #37–38	1996	45
I TL 174-A	Uncle Scrooge	"The Flying Scot"	Uncle Scrooge #315–316	1998	49
S 77048	Uncle Scrooge	"The Big Break-in"	Uncle Scrooge #320	2003	15
S 80107	Uncle Scrooge	"One Million Chase"	Uncle Scrooge #322	2003	13
F 98235 C	Mickey Mouse	"It's a Wonderful Christmas Story"	Christmas Parade #3	2005	14
S 64007	Uncle Scrooge	"Around the World in Eighty Daze"	Uncle Scrooge #341	2005	17
I TL 272-A	Uncle Scrooge	"The Secret of Success"	Uncle Scrooge #338	2005	33
I AT 7-A	Uncle Scrooge	"Anti-Dollarosis"	Uncle Scrooge #351	2006	25
I TL 430-B	Pluto and Ellsworth	"Foxy Hunters"	Mickey Mouse Adventures #10	2006	5
I TL 369-A	Uncle Scrooge	"Being Good For Goodness Sake"	Uncle Scrooge #360	2006	30
I TL 206-A	Mickey Mouse	"The Delta Dimension"	Mickey Mouse Adventures #11	2006	72
I TL 339-A	Mickey Mouse	"The Incredible Black Comet"	Mickey Mouse #292	2006	29
S 86139	Uncle Scrooge	"The Dollar Stalactite"	Uncle Scrooge #362	2007	14
I TL 154-A	Goofy	"The Great Gawrsh-Durn Champion"	WDC&S #681	2007	32
I AO 54051-A	Mickey Mouse	"Memoirs Of An Invisible Santa"	Christmas Parade #5	2008	29
I TL 222-A	Mickey Mouse	"The Sacred Spring of Seasons Past"	WDC&S #697-8	2008	59
I AT 120-A	Uncle Scrooge	"Last Hero of Banania"	Uncle Scrooge #373	2008	20
I AT 106-A	Uncle Scrooge	"The Easter Eggs-Port"	Uncle Scrooge #376	2008	21
I TL 348-A	Uncle Scrooge	"Taking the Plunge"	Uncle Scrooge #378	2008	29
I TL 552-B	Daisy Duck	"Witness Persecution"	Walt Disney Treasures #2	2008	18
I TL 386-A	Uncle Scrooge	"Lights Fantastic"	Valentine Classics #1	2010	32
I TL 167-A	Mickey Mouse	"Lost In the Microcosmos	Mickey Mouse Classics #1	2010	33
S 77053	Uncle Scrooge	"One With the Wind"	Uncle Scrooge #333	2004	13
The following stories were originally produced for Egmont.
D/D 2000-021	Uncle Scrooge	"Security"	Uncle Scrooge #343	2005	12
D/D 2000-022	Uncle Scrooge	"All You Need is Love"	Uncle Scrooge #344	2005	13
D 2000-188	Uncle Scrooge	"The Funny Carrots"	Uncle Scrooge #346	2005	16
D 99156	Mickey Mouse	"History Re-Petes Itself"	Walt Disney's Comics and Stories #654	2005	12
D/D 2002-002	Uncle Scrooge and Donald Duck	"The Keeper of Babylon Gardens"	Uncle Scrooge #359	2006	12
D/D 2001-017	Mickey Mouse	"The Transmutant Gifts"	Walt Disney's Comics and Stories #685	2007	16
D/E 2000-003	Mickey Mouse	"A Quiet Day at the Beach"	Walt Disney's Comics and Stories #691	2008	10
D 2004-236	Goofy	"Don't Worry About It"	Mickey Mouse #304	2011	10
