= Legend of the Three Caballeros =

American animated television series

- Genre: Action-adventure; Comedy
- Based on: Donald Duck by: Walt Disney; Dick Lundy
- Developed by: Disney Digital Network
- Directed by: Matt Danner
- Voices of: Tony Anselmo; Eric Bauza; Jaime Camil; Grey Griffin; Jessica DiCicco; Tress MacNeille; Wayne Knight; Kevin Michael Richardson; Jim Cummings
- Theme music composer: Manuel Esperzon Gonzalez; Ernesto Cortazar; Ray Gilbert
- Opening theme: "The Three Caballeros" by Gabriel Mann
- Composers: Gabriel Mann; Rebecca Kneubuhl
- Country of origin: United States
- No. of seasons: 1
- No. of episodes: 13

Production
- Executive producers: Joe Sichta; Sarah Finn; Matt Danner
- Editor: Christopher Painter
- Running time: 22 minutes
- Production companies: Disney Digital Network; 6 Point Harness; Atomic Cartoons; Mercury Filmworks

Original release
- Network: DisneyLife (Philippines)
- Release: June 9, 2018

Legend of the Three Caballeros is an American animated television series based on the 1944 animated Disney film The Three Caballeros. As with the original film, the series features the characters Donald Duck, José Carioca, and Panchito Pistoles. It was produced by Disney Digital Network and animated by 6 Point Harness, Atomic Cartoons and Mercury Filmworks.

It was first released in 2018 in the Philippines on DisneyLife. In the United States, it was released on Disney+ when it launched on November 12, 2019, and later aired on Disney XD from August 7 to October 30, 2021.

== Premise ==
When Donald Duck inherits a cabana from his great-grandfather Clinton Coot in the New Quackmore Institute alongside Brazilian parrot José Carioca and Mexican rooster Panchito Gonzalez, they discover a magical book that when opened releases a goddess named Xandra. The goddess explains that Donald, José, and Panchito are the descendants of a trio of adventurers known as the Three Caballeros, who long ago travelled to stop the evil sorcerer Lord Felldrake from taking over the world and ultimately sealed him in a magical staff.

Meanwhile, the staff containing Felldrake is discovered by his descendant Baron Von Sheldgoose, the corrupt President of the New Quackmore Institute. As Sheldgoose sets out to revive Felldrake, the new Three Caballeros must learn to become heroes to save the world from disaster.

== Characters ==
=== Main cast ===
- Donald Duck (voiced by Tony Anselmo): A constantly unlucky, angry, and unintelligible duck who is a descendant of one of the Three Caballeros.
- Panchito Gonzalez (voiced by Jaime Camil): A Mexican rooster who is a descendant of one of the Three Caballeros. His full name in this series is "Panchito Romero Miguel Francisco Quintero Gonzalez III", omitting the name "Junipero" from House of Mouse, while the last name "Gonzalez" is used in the credits instead of his nickname "Pistoles".
- José Carioca (voiced by Eric Bauza): A Brazilian parrot who is a descendant of one of the Three Caballeros.
- Xandra, the Goddess of Adventure (voiced by Grey Griffin): A Greek goddess who is cursed to be trapped in a book whenever it is closed, prompting her to use a bookmark to close it without being trapped. She wields a magical bow and arrows in battle.
- April, May, and June (all voiced by Jessica DiCicco): Daisy Duck's triplet nieces, wearing yellow, orange, and purple respectively, who communicate with Donald through a magic mirror to help and provide advice. They are portrayed as phone-obsessed but savvy teenage girls, and unlike their counterparts, Huey, Dewey, and Louie Donald Duck's nephews wearing red, blue and green, have slightly different personalities and voices. The series marks their second appearance in animation after the House of Mouse episode "Ladies' Night", and their first with speaking roles.
- Ari the Aracuan Bird (voiced by Dee Bradley Baker): A small, crazy bird who runs and maintains the cabana that the Caballeros inherit.
- Lord Felldrake Sheldgoose (voiced by Kevin Michael Richardson): An evil sorcerer and Baron's ancestor who becomes trapped in a staff after a battle with the ancient Caballeros. He recruits his descendant to help him conquer the world. A recurring gag throughout the series is Felldrake hitting Baron on the head whenever he says or does something unintelligent.
- Baron Von Sheldgoose (voiced by Wayne Knight): A rich goose and president of the New Quackmore Institute, who becomes Felldrake's assistant in helping him conquer the world.

=== Supporting ===
- Leopold the Horrible (voiced by Dee Bradley Baker): An anthropomorphic gargoyle that is Felldrake's pet and servant. He constantly refers to Felldrake and Sheldgoose as its mother and father.
- Daisy Duck (voiced by Tress MacNeille): Donald's girlfriend who breaks up with him after having enough of his issues, even though she was truly hurting him. Throughout the series, Donald tries to make amends to her while keeping their identities as Caballeros a secret to protect her.
- The Bear Rug (voiced by Jim Cummings): a bear-shaped rug that comes to life after Donald puts the Spark of Life inside of it. After seeing its will to live, the Caballeros agree to let it stay and keep the Spark inside of it.
- Rottweiler Guards (voiced by Jim Cummings): a pair of rottweilers who act as Sheldgoose's personal security.

=== Guest characters ===
- Dapper Duck (voiced by David Kaye): Daisy's well-mannered new boyfriend after she dumps Donald. Originally appeared in Donald's Double Trouble.
- Scrooge McDuck (voiced by Eric Bauza): Donald's rich uncle who is briefly seen crying when his money starts falling out of his Money Bin.

== Episodes ==
Chapters	Title	Original release date	American air date	U.S. viewers (millions)
1	"Dope-A-Cabana"	June 9, 2018	August 7, 2021	N/A
After a miserable birthday where Donald loses his job, his house, and his girlfriend Daisy, he gets a letter saying he has an inheritance from his great-grandfather Clinton Coot. When he arrives at the run-down cabana in the New Quackmore Institute, Donald is aggravated to find that he has to share it with two roommates named José and Panchito. While searching the cabana with Daisy's nieces and the unusual caretaker Ari for anything they can sell for cash, the unlikely trio find a strange book and open it, releasing a magical goddess that attacks them.
2	"Labyrinth and Repeat"	June 9, 2018	August 14, 2021	0.04
The trio manage to calm the goddess down and she introduces herself as Xandra, the Goddess of Adventure. She initially mistakes Donald, José, and Panchito for The Three Caballeros but is disappointed to find that they are their lackluster descendants. When the trio tell her that they're looking for treasure, Xandra teleports them to Crete where they fight the Minotaur within the hidden labyrinth. Despite their differences, they manage to prove themselves to Xandra as the Caballeros's rightful heirs by finding three magical amulets left by their ancestors. Meanwhile, Baron Von Sheldgoose discovers a magical staff containing his evil ancestor Lord Felldrake.
3	"Pyramid-Life Crisis"	June 9, 2018	August 21, 2021	0.02
With Sheldgoose to carry him around and his faithful minion Leopold for transportation, Felldrake begins his evil plans by traveling to Egypt. He intends to use the pyramids, which were actually giant rocketships built by space mummies, to travel to the Moon and take over the Egyptians' giant robot army stationed there. The Caballeros quickly give chase with Xandra's help and foil Felldrake for the first time.
4	"World Tree Caballeros!"	June 9, 2018	August 28, 2021	N/A
After detecting Felldrake in Rome, Xandra takes the Caballeros to the World Tree, where her fellow gods protect the planets that grow on its branches. Xandra is disappointed to find that the gods have grown older and have given up violence, and she and the Caballeros must encourage them to find the strength to fight again when Felldrake tries to take a planet's power for his own.
5	"No Man is an Easter Island"	June 9, 2018	September 4, 2021	N/A
On Easter Island, Felldrake and Sheldgoose convince the Moai to take a vacation from their duty of preventing evil Lava Lizards from incinerating the world. Donald refuses to go with the Caballeros as he has a date with Daisy, and so José, Panchito, and Xandra must find a way to stop the Moai beach party without him.
6	"Stonehenge Your Bets"	June 9, 2018	September 11, 2021	N/A
The Caballeros head to Stonehenge, which is the secret portal to Goblin Town. Once inside, the new Goblin King Felldrake sentences them to Goblin Jail and then demands that the goblins go to war. When their weapons prove unsatisfactory, Felldrake unleashes an unstoppable war beast. The Caballeros must recover Xandra's book and escape Goblin Jail before the beast reaches the portal back to Earth.
7	"Mount Rushmore (or Less)"	June 9, 2018	September 18, 2021	N/A
After retrieving the Spark of Life that Lord Felldrake intended to steal from Mount Rushmore, the Caballeros are assigned to guard it while Xandra and the nieces are at the Institute soirée. When they get bored, they stuff it into the cabana's bear rug, bringing it to life. As the Caballeros try to catch the bear as it seeks food, Xandra crashes the soirée, Sheldgoose deals with the Institute boardmembers who demand explanations for his absences, and Daisy shows off her new boyfriend Dapper Duck to Donald's anger, although Dapper later runs out on her at the first sign of danger.
8	"Nazca Racing"	June 9, 2018	September 25, 2021	N/A
To stop Felldrake's new plan, the Caballeros and Xandra travel to the Nazca Lines and enter a world of two dimensions where chalk drawings come to life. However, it ends up being a trap and the Caballeros must escape before Felldrake and Sheldgoose erase them forever. Meanwhile, April, May, and June sneak into Sheldgoose's mansion and make some shocking discoveries.
9	"Mexico a Go-Go"	June 9, 2018	October 2, 2021	N/A
The Caballeros are heading to Mexico after noticing Felldrake's activity there, but Donald has another date with Daisy and he can't be there in person. The nieces agree to help him by posing as Donald while he speaks to her from Mexico through a pair of magic mirrors, but this backfires and Daisy becomes even more furious. In Mexico, the natives revere and worship Panchito as a mighty warrior before throwing him into a ritualistic wrestling match against Sheldgoose. When the other Caballeros and Felldrake interfere with the match, the God of Death appears and kills them all as punishment for breaking the rules.
10	"Mt. Fuji Whiz"	June 9, 2018	October 9, 2021	N/A
The Caballeros are dead and trapped in the Underworld. As they try to escape, they find Clinton Coot, the one who left them the cabana in his will. He explains the history of the original Caballeros and how he spent his whole life following their exploits, then helps them find a way to return to life while newly-appointed Underworld managers Sheldgoose and Felldrake attempt to stop their escape. As the nieces attempt a seance to contact the Caballeros, Xandra goes to the Underworld herself to rescue them. With her help, the Caballeros return to life on Earth, while Felldrake and Sheldgoose are kicked out of the Underworld for being bad employees.
11	"Thanks a Camelot"	June 9, 2018	October 16, 2021	N/A
With the Caballeros back among the living, Xandra takes them and the nieces to Camelot to get them some proper "hero training" from King Arthur himself, but the King's purely-motivational training leaves a lot to be desired when the nieces accidentally summon a dragon. Meanwhile, Sheldgoose breaks into the Caballeros' cabana to steal back the Spark of Life. Though he is foiled by Ari and the bear, he manages to steal the amulets instead.
12	"Shangri-La-Di-Da"	June 9, 2018	October 23, 2021	N/A
Daisy's patience with Donald has run out, so Xandra books them for a vacation in Shangri-La to help solve all their problems. The Yeti resort staff have orders to not let Donald leave until his temper has been dealt with once and for all, leaving him unable to help the other Caballeros as they begin a final assault on Sheldgoose's mansion to stop him from reviving Felldrake.
13	"Sheldgoose Square Dance"	June 9, 2018	October 30, 2021	N/A
Donald arrives in time to join Xandra and the Caballeros and the four of them charge the basement of the mansion, while Felldrake gives Sheldgoose powers of his own to stall them while he reaches his full power. Sheldgoose's attempts to summon evil allies from their past adventures are countered by the Caballeros's own allies, and they arrive in time for Felldrake to awaken and destroy the Institute. The Caballeros try to fight Felldrake but are overpowered and pushed to the verge of defeat. In their last moment, they are contacted by Blazebeak, an ancient wizard whose power had been protecting them through their amulets. With his power, the Caballeros attempt to banish Felldrake back into his staff, but Sheldgoose destroys it out of panic and inadvertently restores everything to normal. His true nature exposed, the boardmembers strip Sheldgoose of his presidency and Donald is named the new Acting President to everybody's happiness. As Sheldgoose escapes on Leopold, he finds that Felldrake is now trapped inside his own body, and Felldrake decides to call in a favor from an "old friend", ending the show on a cliffhanger.

== Production ==
According to Francisco Angones, co-executive producer on the 2017 DuckTales reboot, the series was completed before DuckTales began production. However, the series was not released until 2018, one year after DuckTales premiered.

== Release ==
The series was first released on the DisneyLife app in the Philippines on June 9, 2018, and premiered on Disney Channel in Southeast Asia on January 1, 2019.

In the United States, the series was released as part of Disney+'s launch on November 12, 2019. The series made its U.S. television premiere on August 7, 2021, on Disney XD.
