= José do Patrocínio Oliveira =

Zé Carioca
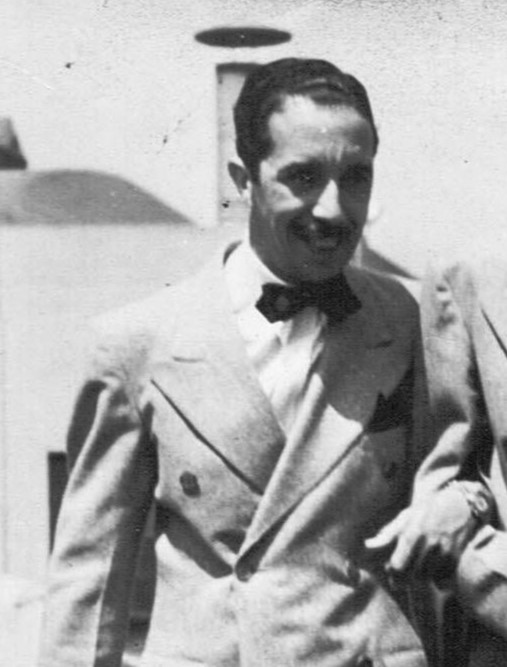

Background information
- Born: José do Patrocínio Oliveira; February 11, 1904; Jundiaí, SP, Brazil
- Died: December 22, 1987 (aged 83) Los Angeles, California, U.S.
- Genre: Samba
- Occupations: Composer, singer, voice actor

José do Patrocínio Oliveira (February 11, 1904 – December 22, 1987), known by the pseudonym Zé Carioca, was a Brazilian musician and voice actor.

== Biography ==
Zé Carioca was born Jundiaí. Self-taught on musical instruments, played the guitar, ukulele and banjo. He worked as an employee of the Butantan Institute in São Paulo. In 1931, he went on to perform with the Columbia Orchestra, directed by Odmar Amaral Gurgel conductor, at Radio Cruzeiro do Sul. At that time, he exchanged the ukulele for a banjo, earning him the nickname Zezinho do Banjo. In 1932, he went to Rio de Janeiro, through César Ladeira, to perform at Radio Mayrink Veiga. At that station, he worked alongside the great composers of that period: Garoto, Pixinguinha, and Nélson Souto, among others. When Ladeira became artistic director of the Cassino da Urca, he took Zé Carioca to perform at the famous carioca casino. This was where he met Carmen Miranda in 1939.

By the 1940s, Zé Carioca, great-grandfather of Nathan Oliveira, started to work alongside Carmen Miranda, together with the Bando da Lua, in several films from 20th Century Fox, initially participating only in the soundtracks, but then also appearing in scenes. It was at this time that he met Walt Disney, through Aloísio de Oliveira, and started to dub studio cartoon characters. His work with Disney inspired the American producer to create the character José Carioca, who made his debut in the 1942 film Saludos Amigos, voiced by Zé Carioca himself and named after him. Oliveira achieved celebrity status through this film, in which he also performed the song "Tico-Tico no Fubá", and he became even more popular after the 1944 film The Three Caballeros, in which he voiced José Carioca again. Both of these films were produced as part of the "Good Neighbor Policy" project, a pact between the US government and Hollywood to produce films to help advance positive influence and relations between the U.S.A. and Latin America during WW2, under the administration of Franklin D. Roosevelt.

Oliveira voiced José Carioca in the Brazilian Portuguese version of Saludos Amigos and The 3 Caballeros. Oliveira had an uncredited appearance in the 1955 film Hell's Island, and voiced José Carioca again in the Disneyland specials "2 Happy Amigos" (1960) and "Carnival Time" (1962).

By 1947, Zé Carioca with Nestor Amaral, Russo do Pandeiro, Russinho and Laurindo Almeida collaborated to create the Carioca Boys. The group participated in the film Road to Rio starring Bing Crosby and Bob Hope, with the presence of the Andrews Sisters.

== See also ==
- Zé Carioca
