= Disney Sports Football =

2002 video game

- Developer: Konami Computer Entertainment Osaka
- Publisher: Konami
- Platforms: Game Boy Advance, GameCube
- Release: Game Boy Advance: JP: July 25, 2002; NA: November 25, 2002; GameCube: JP: December 12, 2002; NA: December 17, 2002
- Genre: Sports
- Modes: Single-player, multiplayer

Disney Sports Football (Note: Known in Japan as Disney Sports: American Football. (Note: Japanese: ディズニースポーツ：アメリカン フットボール, Hepburn: Dizunī Supōtsu: Amerikan Futtobōru)) is a pair of 2002 sports video games released by Konami for the GameCube and Game Boy Advance.

== Gameplay ==
The game features Disney characters including Mickey Mouse, Minnie Mouse, Donald Duck and Goofy playing major league American football. Players pick a team to play in Challenge, Cup, Exhibition, and Practice modes against a number of opposing teams, and have a choice of magic items to help their team. The game includes commentary.

== Characters ==
The game introduces several new characters to the Disney Sports series, including: Mortimer Mouse, Scrooge McDuck from DuckTales, José Carioca from Saludos Amigos, the Big Bad Wolf from The Three Little Pigs, and the alligators from Fantasia, though they have no lines.

Each character has their own specific team name:

- The Superstars (Mickey Mouse)
- The Charmers (Minnie Mouse)
- The Seaducks (Donald Duck)
- The Belles (Daisy Duck)
- The Spacenuts (Goofy)
- The Lords (Max Goof)
- The TinyRockets (Huey, Dewey, and Louie, Scrooge McDuck and José Carioca)
- The Steamrollers (Pete)
- The Imperials (Mortimer Mouse)
- The Wolfgangs (Big Bad Wolf)
- The Headhunters (Alligators from Fantasia, but led by one named Boss instead of Ben Ali Gator)
- Mickey's All-Stars (Mickey, Minnie, Donald, Daisy, Goofy and Max)
- Pete's All-Stars (Pete, Mortimer, Big Bad Wolf and Boss)

== Reception ==
Reception

Aggregate score
Aggregator	Score	
Aggregator	GBA	GameCube
Metacritic	62/100	59/100

Review scores
Publication	Score	
Publication	GBA	GameCube
AllGame	2.5/5	3/5
Famitsu	22/40	28/40
Game Informer	N/A	6.75/10
GamesMaster	N/A	71%
GameSpot	7.4/10	5.2/10
GameSpy	N/A	3/5
IGN	5/10	5.1/10
NGC Magazine	N/A	69%
Nintendo Power	3.6/5	3.5/5
X-Play	N/A	3/5

The game received "mixed" reviews on both platforms according to the review aggregation website Metacritic. In Japan, Famitsu gave it a score of 22 out of 40 for the Game Boy Advance version, and 28 out of 40 for the GameCube version.
