= David Gerstein =

American comic book writer and editor

- Born: February 6, 1974 (age 52)
- Education: Williams College (BA in History)
- Occupations: Writer; editor; graphic designer; historian
- Years active: 1992–present
- Website: cartoonresearch.com/index.php/david-gersteins-virtual-inkwell/

David Gerstein (born February 6, 1974) is an American comics author and editor as well as an animation historian. Gerstein has five books and countless comic book credits to his name. He has written many Disney comics stories, usually featuring Mickey Mouse and/or Donald Duck and provided American English script doctoring for Mickey and Donald stories that were originally written in a different language. Past employments include Egmont Creative A/S, a Danish comics studio, and Gemstone Publishing. His current work is with various affiliates of both Egmont and Fantagraphics Books.

Recurring gags in Gerstein's writing (both original stories and script doctoring of others') include quotations from William Shakespeare, Gilbert and Sullivan, and T.S. Eliot, often paraphrased in a humorous manner.

== Book work ==
As author/editor (or co-editor):

- Uncle Scrooge: Clan McDuck Stories and Glories (Fantagraphics Books, 2026)
- Winnie the Pooh: The Hundred Acre Wood Comic Collection (Fantagraphics Books, 2025)
- Disney Masters—Goofy: Super Goof and the Strange Case of Dr. Syclocks (Fantagraphics Books, 2025)
- Donald Duck: The Ultimate History (with J. B. Kaufman; TASCHEN, 2024)
- Donald Duck: The 90th Anniversary Collection (Fantagraphics Books, 2024)
- Disney Afternoon Adventures—Chip 'n Dale Rescue Rangers: The Count Roquefort Case (Fantagraphics Books, 2023)
- Disney Comics: Around the World in One Hundred Years (Fantagraphics Books, 2023)
- Uncle Scrooge: The Diamond Jubilee Collection (Fantagraphics Books, 2022)
- The Complete Life and Times of Scrooge McDuck Deluxe Edition (Fantagraphics Books, 2021)
- Disney Masters—Uncle Scrooge: Pie in the Sky (Fantagraphics Books, 2021)
- Disney Afternoon Adventures—Darkwing Duck: Just Us Justice Ducks (Fantagraphics Books, 2021)
- Disney Masters—Donald Duck: Follow the Fearless Leader (Fantagraphics Books, 2020)
- Disney Masters—Donald Duck: The Forgetful Hero (Fantagraphics Books, 2020)
- Disney Masters—Mickey Mouse: The Ice Sword Saga Book 2 (Fantagraphics Books, 2020)
- Disney Masters—Donald Duck: Scandal on the Epoch Express (Fantagraphics Books, 2020)
- Disney Masters—Mickey Mouse: The Ice Sword Saga Book 1 (Fantagraphics Books, 2019)
- Mickey Mouse: The 90th Anniversary Collection (IDW Publishing, 2019)
- The Don Rosa Library—Uncle Scrooge and Donald Duck: The Old Castle's Other Secret (Fantagraphics Books, 2018)
- Mickey Mouse: The Greatest Adventures (Fantagraphics Books, 2018)
- Mickey Mouse: The Ultimate History (with J. B. Kaufman; TASCHEN, 2018)
- Disney Masters—Donald Duck: The Great Survival Test (Fantagraphics Books, 2018)
- The Don Rosa Library—Uncle Scrooge and Donald Duck: The Three Caballeros Ride Again! (Fantagraphics Books, 2018)
- The Floyd Gottfredson Library—Walt Disney's Mickey Mouse: The Mysterious Dr. X (Fantagraphics Books, 2018)
- Mickey Mouse: Timeless Tales, Vol. 3 (IDW Publishing, 2018)
- The Don Rosa Library—Uncle Scrooge and Donald Duck: Escape from Forbidden Valley (Fantagraphics Books, 2017)
- Uncle Scrooge: Timeless Tales, Vol. 3 (IDW Publishing, 2017)
- Donald Duck: Timeless Tales, Vol. 3 (IDW Publishing, 2017)
- The Don Rosa Library—Uncle Scrooge and Donald Duck: The Treasure of the Ten Avatars (Fantagraphics Books, 2017)
- The Floyd Gottfredson Library—Walt Disney's Mickey Mouse: Mickey vs. Mickey (Fantagraphics Books, 2017)
- Donald Duck: Timeless Tales, Vol. 2 (IDW Publishing, 2017)
- Uncle Scrooge: Timeless Tales, Vol. 2 (IDW Publishing, 2017)
- Mickey Mouse: Timeless Tales, Vol. 2 (IDW Publishing, 2016)
- The Don Rosa Library—Uncle Scrooge and Donald Duck: The Universal Solvent (Fantagraphics Books, 2016)
- The Floyd Gottfredson Library—Walt Disney's Mickey Mouse: Planet of Faceless Foes (Fantagraphics Books, 2016)
- Mickey Mouse: Timeless Tales, Vol. 1 (IDW Publishing, 2016)
- The Don Rosa Library—Uncle Scrooge and Donald Duck: The Richest Duck in the World (Fantagraphics Books, 2016)
- The Floyd Gottfredson Library—Walt Disney's Mickey Mouse: Rise of the Rhyming Man (Fantagraphics Books, 2016)
- Uncle Scrooge: Timeless Tales, Vol. 1 (IDW Publishing, 2016)
- The Don Rosa Library—Uncle Scrooge and Donald Duck: The Last of the Clan McDuck (Fantagraphics Books, 2015)
- The Floyd Gottfredson Library—Walt Disney's Mickey Mouse: The Tomorrow Wars (Fantagraphics Books, 2015)
- The Don Rosa Library—Uncle Scrooge and Donald Duck: Treasure Under Glass (Fantagraphics Books, 2015)
- The Floyd Gottfredson Library—Walt Disney's Mickey Mouse: March of the Zombies (Fantagraphics Books, 2015)
- Learn to Draw Mickey Mouse & Friends Through the Decades (Walter Foster Publishing, 2015)
- The Don Rosa Library—Uncle Scrooge and Donald Duck: Return to Plain Awful (Fantagraphics Books, 2014)
- The Floyd Gottfredson Library—Walt Disney's Mickey Mouse: Lost in Lands of Long Ago (Fantagraphics Books, 2014)
- The Don Rosa Library—Uncle Scrooge and Donald Duck: The Son of the Sun (Fantagraphics Books, 2014)
- The Floyd Gottfredson Library—Walt Disney's Mickey Mouse Outwits the Phantom Blot (Fantagraphics Books, 2014)
- Walt Disney's Hall of Fame: Manuel Gonzales (Egmont Serieforlaget, 2013)
- The Floyd Gottfredson Library—Walt Disney's Mickey Mouse Color Sundays: Robin Hood Rides Again (Fantagraphics Books, 2013)
- The Floyd Gottfredson Library—Walt Disney's Mickey Mouse Color Sundays: Call of the Wild (Fantagraphics Books, 2013)
- The Floyd Gottfredson Library—Walt Disney's Mickey Mouse: House of the Seven Haunts! (Fantagraphics Books, 2012)
- The Floyd Gottfredson Library—Walt Disney's Mickey Mouse: High Noon at Inferno Gulch (Fantagraphics Books, 2012)
- The Katzenjammer Kids—100 Years in Norway (Egmont Serieforlaget, 2011)
- The Floyd Gottfredson Library—Walt Disney's Mickey Mouse: Trapped on Treasure Island (Fantagraphics Books, 2011)
- The Floyd Gottfredson Library—Walt Disney's Mickey Mouse: Race to Death Valley (Fantagraphics Books, 2011)
- Walt Disney's Hall of Fame: Floyd Gottfredson II (Egmont Serieforlaget, 2010)
- Walt Disney's Hall of Fame: Dick Kinney and Al Hubbard (Egmont Serieforlaget, 2009)
- Walt Disney Treasures—Uncle Scrooge: A Little Something Special (Gemstone Publishing, 2008)
- Walt Disney Treasures—Disney Comics: 75 Years of Innovation (Gemstone Publishing, 2006)
- Mickey and the Gang: Classic Stories in Verse (Gemstone Publishing, 2005)
- Donald Duck: 70 Years (Egmont Serieforlaget A/S, 2004)
- The Walt Disney Centennial Book (Egmont Serieforlaget A/S, 2001)
- 70 Years With Mickey Mouse (Egmont Serieforlaget A/S, 1998)
- Nine Lives To Live: A Classic Felix Celebration (Fantagraphics, 1996)
- Walt Disney's Silly Symphonies (Fantagraphics, 2023)

As contributing author/editor:

- Disney Epic Mickey: The Comics Collection (Fantagraphics Books, 2025)
- Disney Masters—Donald Duck: Tales of Andold Wild Duck (Fantagraphics Books, 2025)
- Disney Masters—Uncle Scrooge: World Wide Witch (Fantagraphics Books, 2024)
- Scrooge McDuck: The Dragon of Glasgow (Fantagraphics Books, 2023)
- Donald Duck: Donald's Happiest Adventures (Fantagraphics Books, 2023)
- Mickey Mouse: Zombie Coffee (Fantagraphics Books, 2022)
- Disney Masters—Mickey Mouse: Trapped in the Shadow Dimension (Fantagraphics Books, 2021)
- Society is Nix: Gleeful Anarchy of the Dawn of the American Comic Strip 1895-1915 (Sunday Press Books, 2013)
- Mickey All-Stars (Fantagraphics Books, 2019)
- Walt Disney's Hall of Fame: Al Taliaferro (Egmont Serieforlaget, 2013)
- The 100 Greatest Looney Tunes Cartoons (Insight Editions, 2010)
- Kalle Anka & Co – Den kompletta årgången 1965-02 (Egmont Kärnan AB, 2010)
- Mickey Mouse Classics series (Boom! Kids, 2010)
- Donald Duck & Co-De komplette årgangene 1965 del V (Egmont Serieforlaget, 2009)
- Animation Art: From Pencil To Pixel (Harper Design International, 2004)
- Looney Tunes: The Ultimate Visual Guide (Dorling Kindersley, 2003)
- Black Images in the Comics (Fantagraphics, 2003)

== Comics and magazine work ==
- Uncle Scrooge (Fantagraphics Books) (As editor and contributing writer)
- Mickey Mouse (Fantagraphics Books) (As editor and contributing writer)
- Donald Duck (Fantagraphics Books) (As editor and contributing writer)
- Uncle Scrooge (Gemstone Publishing/Boom! Kids/IDW) (As archival editor and contributing writer)
- Mickey Mouse (Gemstone Publishing/Boom! Kids/IDW) (As archival editor and contributing writer)
- Donald Duck (Gemstone Publishing/Boom! Kids/IDW) (As archival editor and contributing writer)
- Walt Disney's Comics and Stories (Gemstone Publishing/Boom! Kids/IDW) (As archival editor and contributing writer)
- Anders And & Co. (Egmont Serieforlaget A/S) (As contributing story editor)
- Walt Disney's Christmas Jubilee Present (Egmont Serieforlaget Norway) (As editor and contributing writer)
- Comic Book Marketplace (Gemstone Publishing) (As writer)
