= Forget It! =

2001 Donald Duck comic by Don Rosa

- Story code: D 2001-095
- Story: Don Rosa
- Ink: Don Rosa
- Hero: Scrooge McDuck
- Pages: 13
- Layout: 4 rows per page
- Appearances: Scrooge McDuck; Donald Duck; Gladstone Gander (cameo); Huey, Dewey and Louie; Magica De Spell; Miss Quackfaster
- First publication: 2002

"Forget It!" is a 2001 Donald Duck comic by Don Rosa. The story was first published in the Danish Anders And & Co. #2002-11; the first American publication was in Uncle Scrooge #328, in April 2004.

== Plot ==
Magica De Spell once again attempts to steal Scrooge McDuck's Number One Dime. This time she is armed with a spell with an interesting effect on its victim. Whenever the victim hears his/her name spoken in conjunction with another thing, he/she immediately forgets the thing in question ever existed, and cannot even comprehend the idea. Magica uses the spell on both Scrooge and Donald and traps them in Scrooge's office by closing the door and causing them to forget doors exist.

Miss Emily Quackfaster frees Scrooge and Donald simply by opening the door, and they chase Magica to the airport, where she is trying to return to Mount Vesuvius. In the process, Scrooge and Donald forget various things, such as how to drive a car, how to walk, or even how to speak. Scrooge comes face to face with Magica, but unfortunately forgets who she is, so he lets her go. Donald reminds him that she is an enemy, so Scrooge resumes chase and they end up in a fight, during which Magica accidentally casts the spell on herself.

Magica shakes Scrooge off and flees in a helicopter, but unfortunately, the pilot calls her by name and asks what her destination is. This causes Magica to forget all about what she is trying to accomplish. She then returns to Duckburg to ask Scrooge what it was. However, the effects of the spell on the Ducks have worn off, and thus Scrooge is lucid enough to trick Magica into giving him the dime back.
