= The Treasure of the Ten Avatars =

The Treasure of the Ten Avatars cover artwork by Don Rosa.

"The Treasure of the Ten Avatars" is a 1996 Donald Duck story by Don Rosa.

The story was first published in the Danish Anders And & Co. #1996-26; the first American publication was in Uncle Scrooge Adventures #51, in October 1997.

== Plot ==
Scrooge McDuck has bought land in India's Punjab region, and arrives on the scene together with Donald and his nephews to inspect what he has bought. He meets with the local maharaja to seek his help in enlisting a work force, but the maharaja openly admits to being thoroughly corrupt, diverting the millions of dollars in foreign aid sent to his province; he declines to help, since it is his people's abject poverty that keeps that aid flowing into his coffers.

Left on their own, the Ducks begin their quest, when they accidentally discover a stone pillar, dating back to 326 BC, and tells the tale of Alexander the Great's attempt to conquer Punjab. However, the conquest failed, with Alexander's men fleeing India in utter terror. The tale also tells that Alexander was seeking Shambala, an ancient Indian city containing untold riches. When Scrooge hears of this, he sets out to find the city for himself. The maharaja overhears this and follows the Ducks in secret.

The Ducks eventually find Shambala in ruins, but the city is still booby-trapped with mortal dangers. Near the main temple they find some sort of control panel with ten buttons, each based on one of the ten avatars of Vishnu. The boys stay at the control panel while Scrooge and Donald venture deeper, maintaining radio contact with the boys.

All sorts of Indiana Jones-like trap situations occur when Scrooge and Donald progress on their way, with the boys saving them every time by telling them what to do and pressing the right button at the right time. Scrooge and Donald eventually find the treasure, but it's protected with one last booby-trap. The boys are about to clear this trap too, but the maharaja has caught up with them, and prevents the boys from pushing the button, causing the treasure to be flushed into a nearby river. The maharaja pushes another button, which sets off Shambala's self-destruct mechanism. The Ducks and the maharaja flee the city post-haste.

When arriving back in the maharaja's village, the Ducks find that the river has carried the treasure there, but the villagers have already shared it among themselves, finally having enough money to abandon the village and start new lives elsewhere. Scrooge, taking the loss of the treasure philosophically, offers to discuss employing the villagers in his future enterprises in India, and they are happy to agree.

The Maharaja is left in despair. With no treasure and now the ruler of an empty village, he has no remaining pretext to collect "aid" from unsuspecting foreign nations. As the Ducks depart, Scrooge cheerfully reminds him that he still has an unlimited supply of one legacy from his ancestors: the number zero.

== Reception ==
Reviews were generally positive, one calling it "one of those classic globe trotting stories that takes readers around the world and teaches us a little about history. To me, these are the stories that Rosa is masterful at crafting".

== See also ==
- The Treasure of the Ten Avatars served as the title story to Fantagraphics' Uncle Scrooge and Donald Duck: The Don Rosa Library Vol. 7
