= Mau Heymans =

Dutch artist and writer

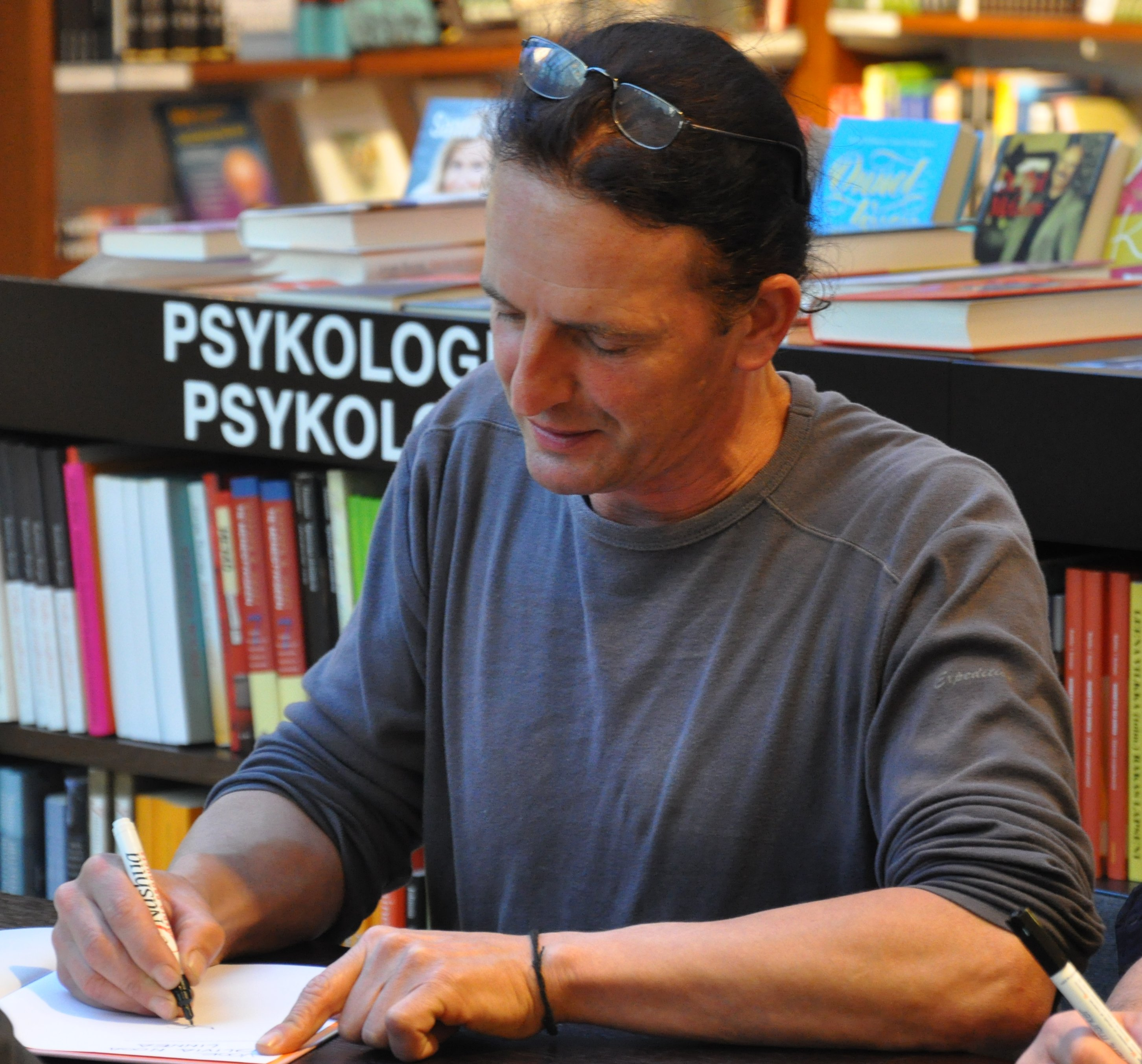
- Mau Heymans in (Turku, 2009)
- Born: 14 April 1961 (age 65) Veldhoven, Netherlands
- Areas: Cartoonist, Writer

Mau Heymans (born 14 April 1961) is a Dutch Disney comics artist and writer. He started his career in 1987. He is primarily an illustrator and also wrote some stories with Kirsten de Graaf. Heyman does Scrooge McDuck universe comics for the publisher Oberon. His style is Barks-inspired, with long necks and beaks on the ducks. Mau Heyman's older brother, Bas Heymans, is also a Disney comics artist, and the brothers have styles very similar to each other.

== Reprints ==
In 2018 Fantagraphics Books began publishing a hardcover series titled Disney Masters, in which Mau and his brother Bas Heymans in 2020 had a volume dedicated to their Disney works.

- Donald Duck: Scandal on the Epoch Express (2020) ISBN 978-1-68396-249-6
