= The Starstruck Duck =

- Story: Don Rosa
- Hero: Donald Duck
- Pages: 10
- Layout: 4 rows per page
- Appearances: Donald Duck; Huey, Dewey and Louie; Mickey Mouse; Goofy
- First publication: 1989

"The Starstruck Duck" is an unfinished Donald Duck story written and sketched in 1989 by Don Rosa on a commission from the Walt Disney Company to promote the MGM Studios park in Disney World.

When Gladstone Comics, Rosa's employer at the time, submitted the script and the sketches of the art to the Walt Disney Company, Disney rejected the story as too commercial. Thus Rosa never drew any finished version of the story, instead it exists only as the original sketches.

Rosa thought Disney's rejection of the script as "too commercial" was weird, as it was Disney who requested the story to promote MGM Studios in the first place.

== Plot ==
Donald Duck and his nephews are visiting MGM Studios in Disney World. Donald buys an autograph book and tries to get Mickey Mouse's autograph. However, Mickey is nowhere to be found, so Donald goes looking for him all around Disney World and eventually gets into trouble.

At one point a tourist couple come to Donald and ask him for an autograph. Donald replies "Certainly! You've heard of my exploits with my famous Uncle Scrooge, eh?" to which the man replies "Uncle who? No, we watch you on TV with that rabbit and that little bald guy!" After an angry Donald leaves the couple, the woman says "I told you that wasn't him! He didn't spit when he talked!"
