= The Duck Who Never Was =

1994 Donald Duck comic book story by Don Rosa

- Story code: D 93574
- Story: Don Rosa
- Ink: Don Rosa
- Hero: Donald Duck
- Pages: 16
- Layout: 4 rows per page
- Appearances: Donald Duck; Scrooge McDuck; Huey, Dewey, and Louie; Gladstone Gander; Daisy Duck; Gyro Gearloose; Grandma Duck; Beagle Boys; Flintheart Glomgold; Magica De Spell; April, May and June
- First publication: May 1994

"The Duck Who Never Was" is a 1994 Disney comics story written and drawn by Don Rosa. It was written to celebrate Donald Duck's sixtieth anniversary. The story was first published in the Danish Anders And & Co. #1994-23; the first American publication was in Donald Duck #286, in September 1994.

== Plot ==
It is Donald Duck's birthday, but he becomes depressed when he discovers that his three nephews have forgotten about his birthday. Donald then applies for a job as a museum janitor, but his application form is turned upside down so that he is mistaken for sixty years old (in reference to the comic being a 60th anniversary celebration), an age at which the job isn't available. While walking out of the museum, Donald is hit in the head by a magic urn. Suddenly, a birthday genie appears and offers him a wish.

Donald doesn't believe the genie at first and inadvertently wishes that he were never born, a wish that the genie grants him. It only gradually dawns on Donald that he has been abruptly transported to an alternate reality: the world as it would be if he had never existed.

When Donald gets out of the museum, he finds the streets dilapidated and his car gone. Just then, he notices Grandma Duck's car nearby and tries to get a lift to the police station. However, Donald is shocked to find Gyro Gearloose at the wheel. When Donald asks him what he's doing in Grandma Duck's car, Gyro says that he bought Grandma Duck's farm years ago. Gyro explains how he was once a brilliant inventor, until he created some think boxes that made animals as smart as people. When Gyro tried reversing their polarity, he was caught in the resulting burst and given a normal human brain. Afterwards, he was never able to invent anything again. (This references an old Carl Barks comic that ended quite differently, because in the original timeline, Donald was present rather than absent.)

Donald is confused at first, but walks off to Scrooge McDuck's Money Bin to use the telephone. Inside, he finds his Grandma, sitting at the front desk, who tells him that she sold the farm to Gyro because she couldn't run it alone (Gus Goose never worked for her) and Daisy Duck bought this building from Scrooge years ago to use as her printing plant. She is now a wealthy novelist, having started writing romance novels to fill her lonely life. A haggard Daisy appears, looking like a diva wearing tons of makeup. After Donald tries explaining his situation to her, Daisy throws him outside (pummeling him with empty bottles, subtly suggesting that in this reality, she has become an alcoholic).

Eventually, Donald realizes that this is real and now he was never born. He meets Gus Goose, who tells him that he went to work for Scrooge McDuck as his top assistant (he was the only relative Scrooge had who could be given the job and isn't as smart as Donald). On his first day at work, Magica De Spell turned up outside the money bin, selling hamburgers for a dime. Gus ignorantly handed her the Number One Dime, causing Scrooge to have a fit when he learnt what his new assistant had done. He came too late to stop Magica from turning the dime into a magical amulet, which she then used to become the richest person in the world.

The loss of the dime destroyed Scrooge's self-confidence, allowing Flintheart Glomgold to cheat him out of his money. Scrooge lost everything, and Glomgold relocated the former McDuck empire to his own home base. Losing the McDuck taxes is slowly turning Duckburg into a ghost town.

Donald flees in horror and drives to his cousin Gladstone Gander's house, thinking that if he saw that Gladstone was just as miserable as everyone else it would cheer him up. However, he doesn't find Gladstone. He instead finds grossly overweight versions of Huey, Dewey, and Louie, sitting on the couch eating junk food: they lived with Gladstone since they were ducklings, never joining the Junior Woodchucks. Gladstone then appears (he is the only one who hasn't suffered from Donald's absence) and accuses Donald of stealing his car.

When Donald tries to run away, he collides with a Beagle Boy in a police outfit (they turned "straight" after Scrooge went bust, but are implied to be a highly corrupt police force).

After witnessing this alternate future, Donald realizes that his existence was important after all. He jumps into Gladstone's car and drives off towards the museum, hoping to find the urn and set things right. He crashes through the museum's walls and finds the urn, but thinks that he used his only wish. However, the genie reveals that Donald gets a wish for each time he touches the urn on his birthday. Donald is hit on the head with the urn and is knocked out cold, but his wish to revert the first wish is granted. When Donald wakes up, he assumes everything was just a dream. However, as he drives away, it is revealed to the reader that the genie does exist, implying that Donald's experience was, in fact, real.

As Donald arrives home, everyone throws him a surprise party and he is given his job back.

== Inspiration ==
The plot is inspired by the 1946 movie classic It's a Wonderful Life, a title that is repeatedly alluded to in the dialogue.
