= The Treasury of Croesus =

- Original cover of the story. Art by Don Rosa
- Story code: D 94012
- Story: Don Rosa
- Ink: Don Rosa
- Hero: Scrooge McDuck
- Pages: 24
- Layout: 4 rows per page
- Appearances: Scrooge McDuck; Donald Duck; Huey, Dewey, and Louie; Magica De Spell; Owatta Pigayam
- First publication: 1995

"The Treasury of Croesus" is a 1995 Donald Duck comic story by Don Rosa. The story was first published in the Danish Anders And & Co. #1995-04; the first American publication was serialized in Walt Disney's Comics and Stories #601-603, in February-June 1996.

== Plot ==
Scrooge McDuck foils what Donald Duck calls "Magica De Spell's most bizarre and complex scheme yet". Donald says neither of them will be satisfied until they are as rich as Croesus. Scrooge says he thinks he's already richer than Croesus once was, but confesses that he can't be certain of this. His three grandnephews tell Scrooge about an exposition at the Duckburg Museum on Croesus. This visit leads our heroes in search of his fabled treasure, as Scrooge himself did 50 years ago. They find the treasure, but due to a rightful ownership by the Turkish locals, all Scrooge keeps is his first coin. Upon learning that a witch named Circe wanted the first coin minted by Croesus for the same reason Magica wants the Number One Dime, Scrooge finds a way to turn this tragedy in a triumph: he gives the coin to Magica. If the spell works, she will no longer try to steal his Number One Dime. Because it doesn't, much to Donald's relief as she tested the amulet on him, Scrooge is now sure he is richer than Croesus once was.
