= José Carioca =

Disney animation and comics character

- Mickey Mouse & Friends and Donald Duck character
- First appearance: Saludos Amigos (1942)
- Created by: Walt Disney
- Voiced by: José Oliveira (original); Rob Paulsen (1999–2020); Marco Antônio Costa (TV Colosso); Eric Bauza (Legend of the Three Caballeros); Bernardo de Paula (DuckTales); Sérgio Stern (Disney theme parks; Mickey Mouse Funhouse)

In-universe information
- Aliases: Joe Carioca; Zé Carioca
- Species: Parrot
- Gender: Male
- Affiliation: Donald Duck; Panchito Pistoles
- Significant others: Maria Vaz; Parquita
- Relatives: Zico and Zeca (nephews); Pascoal Papagaio (ancestor)
- Nationality: Brazilian

José "Zé" Carioca (/ʒoʊˈzeɪ ˌkæriˈoʊkə/ zhoh-ZAY KARR-ee-OH-kə; Portuguese: [ʒuˈzɛ kaˈɾjɔkɐ]) is a cartoon anthropomorphic parrot created by American cartoonist and animator Walt Disney during a trip to Rio de Janeiro in 1941 as a resource to support the relations between Latin America and the US during World War II (as part of the Good Neighbor Policy). It is alleged by some journalists that Disney presented the character to Brazilian comic artist and cartoonist José Carlos de Brito (J. Carlos) and might have tried to hire J. Carlos as well, but the Brazilian had no direct involvement in the creation of José.

The Walt Disney Company then incorporated the idea, being introduced in the 1942 film Saludos Amigos as a friend of Donald Duck, described by Time as "a dapper Brazilian parrot, who is as superior to Donald Duck as the Duck was to Mickey Mouse." He speaks Portuguese. He returned in the 1944 film The Three Caballeros along with Donald and a Mexican rooster named Panchito Pistoles. José is from Rio de Janeiro, Brazil (thus the name "Carioca", which is a term used for a person born in Rio).

== Appearances ==
=== Animation ===
In addition to Saludos Amigos and The Three Caballeros (the Latin American film pair), José appeared with Donald and the Aracuan Bird in the "Blame It on the Samba" segment of the 1948 anthology feature Melody Time.

He also appeared in the segment "Two Happy Amigos" in a 1960 episode of the anthology television series Walt Disney Presents. Much later, he was seen in the Disney Channel series Mickey Mouse Works and House of Mouse, as well as in two episodes of Mickey Mouse Mixed-Up Adventures ("Mickey's Perfecto Day!" and "Super-Charged: Daisy's Grande Goal") and two episodes of Mickey Mouse Funhouse ("Día de Muertos" and "Nochebuena no Funhouse") alongside Panchito. He also made a brief cameo in the 1988 film Who Framed Roger Rabbit.

In the Mickey Mouse short "O Futebol Clássico", José is seen as the announcer of a Brazilian soccer game. He later appears with Donald and Panchito in "¡Feliz Cumpleaños!" as performers at Mickey's birthday and in "Carnaval" as a performer in the parade.

José starred in the main role of Legend of the Three Caballeros, alongside Panchito Pistoles and Donald Duck, which was released on the Disney Life app. José's cigar was removed in this series. He is voiced by Eric Bauza in this version.

He also appeared in a recurring role in the 2017 DuckTales series, voiced by Bernardo de Paula, where he and Panchito used to be Donald's old college bandmates who return to kickstart their band again. He's revealed to work as a flight attendant and uses his umbrella as a weapon against enemies.

José also has a cameo appearance in the 2023 short film Once Upon a Studio, as part of the Walt Disney Animation Studios characters that take a group photo.

=== Comics ===
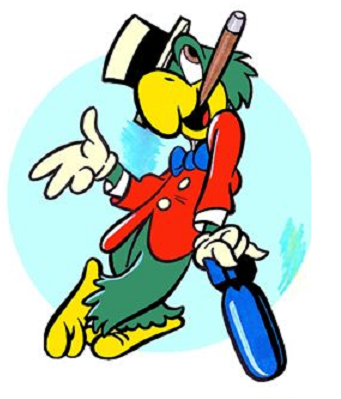
Zé Carioca in 387th Bombardment Squadron emblem, 1943.

In the early 1940s, the Sunday-only Silly Symphony comic strip featured José Carioca, in a series running from October 11, 1942 to October 1, 1944. This was replaced by a Panchito strip, which ran for another year.

In Brazil, José appears alongside Mickey Mouse and Donald Duck in the local Disney comics. He is known as Zé Carioca locally; "Zé" is a familiar form for Portuguese name "José", in much the same way "Joe" is a familiar form for the English name "Joseph". Between 1961 and 2018, he had his Brazilian comic books, in which he is portrayed as living with his friends Nestor (an anthropomorphic crow), Afonsinho (an anthropomorphic duck), and Pedrão (an anthropomorphic dog), along with other characters: his nephews Zico and Zeca (also parrots), his girlfriend Maria Vaz (Portuguese: Rosinha Vaz, another anthropomorphic parrot), daughter of rich entrepreneur Rocha Vaz (an anthropomorphic toucan), and his romantic rival Zé Galo (an anthropomorphic rooster). Local production ended in 2001, but was restarted in 2012. José now has a pet, Old Tom, an alligator originated from the 1966 Fethry and Donald duck comic "Old Tom's Comeback". Since September 2020, new José stories are published by Culturama in the comic book Aventuras Disney.

Comics featuring Joe Carioca, as he is called in the Netherlands, appear occasionally in the Dutch Donald Duck magazine. In these short stories, José occupies his time assuming false identities to impress girls (who usually see through him, leaving him brokenhearted), and wrangling free dinners in expensive restaurants, a habit that often gets him into trouble.

He appears extremely rarely in the German Micky Maus comics and Lustiges Taschenbuch, having appeared around 10 times since his 1980 debut.

In the Brazilian comics, Zé is also part of his neighborhood soccer team and runs a samba school. He has a secret identity as a superhero, Morcego Verde (Green Bat, a Batman spoof), although he is easily recognized by his neighbors.

In recent years, José Carioca has been used alongside Panchito and Donald in two comics by American artist Don Rosa, The Three Caballeros Ride Again (2000) and The Magnificent Seven (Minus 4) Caballeros (2005). The creation of a Brazilian animated character during World War II was part of a strategy called "Good Neighbor Policy" headed by the United States government to improve relations and gather support amongst its neighbor countries.

In 2023, Dutch stories introduced Parquita, José's new girlfriend.

=== Disney Parks ===
In April 2007, Disney re-introduced José Carioca (along with the third Caballero, Panchito) in the newly revamped ride at Epcot's Mexico Pavilion with entirely new animation and a new storyline. It has been dubbed "The Gran Fiesta Tour". After being reunited, The Three Caballeros are set to play a show in Mexico City. But Donald goes missing. José and Panchito must search throughout Mexico for Donald as he takes in various sights around Mexico. The character was previously voiced by Rob Paulsen, although in June 2020 Paulsen announced that, as a Caucasian voice actor, he will no longer play characters of color, including the Brazilian José.

José can also be seen in the Hong Kong Disneyland version of It's a Small World, which opened on April 28, 2008, as well as the Disneyland (in California) version of It's a Small World, installed during major refurbishments between January and November 2008, also as the Tokyo Disneyland version of It's a Small World, installed during major refurbishments between March 2017 and April 2018.

José and Panchito's costumes were extinct at the Disneyland Resort by 2011, but were re-Imagineered for Mickey's Soundsational Parade in May 2011. They now appear with Donald Duck and dancers with a float where Donald is trying to hit a Piñata. José and Panchito also regularly appear in the Walt Disney World Magic Kingdom parade, "Move It! Shake It! MousekeDance It! Street Party", which debuted in 2014 and continues through 2020.

=== Television shows ===
In 1996, in Brazil, José presented the talk show Disney Club within the children's program TV Colosso, shown on Sundays on TV Globo. The character's puppet was manipulated by voice actor Marco Antônio Costa.

=== Video games ===
In 2002, José Carioca appears in the games of the Disney Sports series produced by Konami for Nintendo's GameCube and Game Boy Advance platforms, José is part of The TinyRockets teams alongside Huey, Dewey, and Louie, the games are Disney Sports Soccer (Association football), Disney Sports Basketball (basketball) and Disney Sports Football (American football).

== See also ==
- Malandragem
- Jeitinho
- Gérson's law
- José do Patrocínio Oliveira
