= A Christmas for Shacktown =

1952 Disney comics story

- A Christmas for Shacktown comic book cover
- Story code: W OS 367-02
- Story: Carl Barks
- Ink: Carl Barks
- Pages: 32
- Layout: 4 rows per page
- Appearances: Donald Duck; Huey, Dewey and Louie; Daisy Duck; Scrooge McDuck; Gladstone Gander; Jake McDuck (1st; photo only)
- First publication: Four Color #367; January 1952

"A Christmas for Shacktown" is a 32-page Disney comics story written, drawn, and lettered by Carl Barks. The story was first published in Four Color #367 (January 1952), and tells of Donald Duck's attempts to raise money for a Christmas party for the poor children of Shacktown.

== Plot ==
The story begins with Donald's nephews passing through Shacktown, the most impoverished area of Duckburg. They progressively get more depressed as they see the living conditions there, children of their age dressed in rags and having tired expressions, hunger and sickness evident in many of them. They feel responsible for it and want to help those poor children find some happiness. The Ducks have the idea of organizing a Christmas celebration.

They ask for the help of Daisy Duck, president of a local ladies' society, and their friends in the Junior Woodchucks. Soon, however, it becomes evident that raising enough money is harder than it sounds. With all their efforts, they are still fifty dollars short.

Donald Duck has the idea to ask his Uncle Scrooge for the money. Scrooge refuses his nephew's request for a donation, but nevertheless offers to match Donald's own twenty-five dollars, if he can manage to raise that much.

Donald soon learns that asking for charity during the holidays, when every family struggles with its own increased expenses, is extremely difficult. He tries to trick his Uncle into making the donation, but he is unable to do so. Only when he swallows his pride and asks for his cousin Gladstone Gander's help does he finally succeed in raising his twenty-five dollars.

When he arrives at his uncle's money bin, an apparently shocked Scrooge tells him it is too late. Enraged, Donald opens the vault door and discovers that inside, the overloaded floor had collapsed, and the money has been lost in the caverns below Duckburg. Now Donald still is twenty-five dollars short and has to take care of a shocked and depressed uncle.

Dewey, Huey and Louie remember that they once explored Shacktown district and learned about a cavern that might lead to the lost money. In the cavern, the ducks find a beaver hole that leads to the money, but it can't be expanded as the vibration would collapse the bottom of the cavern, making it impossible to retrieve the money. The boys bring a toy train to retrieve the money and Scrooge promises that they can keep the first load of money, no matter how much it is. They manage to get a hefty pile of bills and Scrooge faints, and using the bills, the residents of Shacktown receive a grand Christmas party. Scrooge, however, resides in the cavern and complains how he must wait for 272 years for the toy train to bring out all the money from the bottom.

== Reception ==
R. Fiore writes, "While Carl Barks was no rebel, his one great dissent with his society was in the matter of Christmas. That holiday, which all of mass entertainment thinks of as Payday, was to Barks just another day when men are wicked in their hearts. "A Christmas for Shacktown" was perhaps his most significant concession to the season that he viewed with distaste as a festival of greed, materialism, and false sentiment."

Thomas Andrae notes, "This story foregrounds the power of a dime, and prefigures Scrooge's lucky coin [the Number One Dime] — but with a crucial difference. When Donald gives Scrooge a dime as a joke, the miser deposits it in his cache. But the coin serves as a punishment for the skinflint's selfishness; it causes his bin to cave in and Scrooge loses his entire fortune. Only the toy train, the gift that he failed to offer, can save his loot, but it will take almost 273 years for the locomotive to retrieve it... Rather than the symbol of Scrooge's thrift it would become, the dime is an emblem of his mean-spiritedness and a vehicle of punishment for his lack of empathy — bad luck rather than good luck. This is an index of how much Barks would transform the skinflint's mythos in the later Uncle Scrooge adventures."

== See also ==
- "A Christmas for Shacktown" served as the title story to Fantagraphics' The Complete Carl Barks Disney Library Vol. 11 - Donald Duck: "A Christmas for Shacktown"
- List of Disney comics by Carl Barks
