= The Magnificent Seven (Minus 4) Caballeros =

2005 Donald Duck comic book story by Don Rosa

- Story code: D 2004-032
- Story: Don Rosa
- Ink: Don Rosa
- Hero: Donald Duck
- Pages: 34
- Layout: 4 rows per page
- Appearances: Donald Duck; Scrooge McDuck; Gladstone Gander; Daisy Duck; Huey, Dewey and Louie; José Carioca; Panchito Pistoles
- First publication: 2005

"The Magnificent Seven (Minus 4) Caballeros" is a 2005 Disney comic written and drawn by Don Rosa. The story was first published in the Danish Anders And & Co. #2005-03; the first American publication was in Walt Disney's Comics and Stories #663, in December 2005.

== Plot ==
Huey, Dewey, and Louie pity the depressed Donald Duck because of the mistreatment he receives from his relatives Scrooge McDuck, Gladstone Gander, and Daisy Duck. They decide that he needs good friends to help him find his smile again, so they nominate him into delivering some merit badges to the Junior Woodchucks in Rio de Janeiro and give him a pamphlet containing the Woodchuck Guidebook's information on Brazil. Meanwhile, Donald's nephews send two telegrams—one for José Carioca and the other one for Panchito Pistoles—to reunite the Three Caballeros.

When Donald arrives in Brazil, he and the other two caballeros enjoy a reunion before deciding they need an adventure. So, at José's suggestion, they become diamond hunters in the Mato Grosso, where Donald buys an ox and a llama to explore the interior plateau of Brazil.

Donald is kidnapped by an evil Indian Chief, who traps animals and sells them on the black market. The chief tells Donald about the "Mines of Fear". José and Panchito free Donald, along with the captured animals, but the chief's necklace is caught by Sẽnor Martinez, Panchito's horse, and he goes after them.

The trio camp in the mountains near a swamp, where Donald reads information from the pamphlet about a lost city. They see the three shining arcs behind the swamp, which form the gate to the lost city. They build a raft and sail to the city where they find the Mines of Ophir, lose their raft, and meet a huge anaconda. The chief find their mounts and the mines, so he makes a reed canoe to finds the trio.

The chief takes a bag of jewels and leaves the caballeros to be eaten by the anaconda. This is the final straw for Donald, remembering his relatives' mistreatment of him, and he grabs a vine, jumps on the chief's canoe, and they fight. Donald's bravery inspires José and Panchito to help him. The chief goes over the falls and the caballeros ride the anaconda out of the swamp where they meet the Indian tribe, who give Panchito the necklace his horse found.

The caballeros then return to Rio. Their role in catching the Chief, a notorious animal rustler, gains José fame for his nightclub act; with the necklace, Panchito has the money for the ranch he has always wanted to buy. When they ask Donald what he got out of their adventure, he points to his own smile and says, "this". Joyfully, the Three Caballeros carouse down the famous Portuguese pavement on Copacabana beach, singing their song.
