= List of Boom! Studios publications =

The American publisher Boom! Studios has published a range of comic books and graphic novels.

== # ==
Title	Series	Issues	Dates	Notes	Reference
10		#1	Dec 2005	One-shot	
2 Guns		#1–5	Apr 2007 – Dec 2007	Limited series; later adapted into a feature film in 2013.	
28 Days Later		#1–24	Jul 2009 – Jun 2011	Limited series; based on the film series, storyline set between 28 Days Later and 28 Weeks Later.	
3 Guns		#1–6	Aug 2013 – Jan 2014	Limited series; sequel story to 2 Guns.	

== A ==
Title	Series	Issues	Dates	Notes	Reference
Abbott		#1–5	Jan 2018 – May 2018	Limited series	
Abbott	1973	#1–5	Jan 2021 – May 2021	Limited series	
Abbott	1979	#1–5	Oct 2023 – Mar 2024	Limited Series	
Abigail and the Snowman		#1–4	Dec 2014 – Mar 2015	Limited series	
Adventure Time		#1–75	Feb 2012 – Apr 2018	Ongoing series; based on TV series	
Adventure Time	2013 Summer Special	#1	Jul 2013		
Adventure Time	2014 Winter Special	#1	Jan 2014		
Adventure Time	Annual	2013	May 2013		
Adventure Time	Annual	2014	Apr 2014		
Adventure Time	Banana Guard Academy	#1–6	Jul 2014 – Dec 2014	Limited series	
Adventure Time	Beginning of the End	#1–3	May 2018 – Jul 2018	Limited series	
Adventure Time	Bitter Sweets	nn	Nov 2014	Graphic novel	
Adventure Time	BMO Bonanza	#1	Mar 2018		
Adventure Time	Brain Robbers	nn	Mar 2016	Graphic novel	
Adventure Time	Candy Capers	#1–6	Jul 2013 – Dec 2013	Limited series	
Adventure Time	Comics	#1–25	Jul 2016 – Jul 2018	Ongoing series	
Adventure Time	Cover Showcase	nn	Dec 2012		
Adventure Time	Grayble Schamables	nn	Apr 2015	Graphic novel	
Adventure Time	Ice King	#1–6	Jan 2016 – Jun 2016	Limited series	
Adventure Time	Islands	nn	Nov 2016	Graphic novel	
Adventure Time	Marceline the Pirate Queen	nn	Feb 2019	Graphic novel	
Adventure Time	Masked Mayhem	nn	Nov 2015	Graphic novel	
Adventure Time	Pixel Princesses	nn	Nov 2013	Graphic novel	
Adventure Time	Playing with Fire	nn	May 2013	Graphic novel	
Adventure Time	President Bubblegum	nn	Sep 2016	Graphic novel	
Adventure Time	Princess and Princess	nn	Jan 2018	Graphic novel	
Adventure Time	Season 11	#1–6	Oct 2018 – Mar 2019	Limited series	
Adventure Time	Seeing Red	nn	Mar 2014	Graphic novel	
Adventure Time	Spoooktacular	2013 #1	Oct 2013		
Adventure Time	Spoooktacular	2015 #1	Oct 2015		
Adventure Time	Spoooktacular	2016 #1	Sep 2016		
Adventure Time	Spoooktacular	2017 #1	Oct 2017		
Adventure Time	The Flip Side	#1–6	Jan 2014 – Jun 2014	Limited series	
Adventure Time	The Four Castles	nn	May 2016	Graphic novel	
Adventure Time	The Ooorient Express	nn	Jul 2017	Graphic novel	
Adventure Time	Thunder Road	nn	Jun 2018	Graphic novel	
Adventure Time Presents	Marceline and the Scream Queens	#1–6	Jul 2012 – Dec 2012	Limited series	
Adventure Time Presents	Marceline Gone Adrift	#1–6	Jan 2015 – Jun 2015	Limited series	
Adventure Time Presents	Marcy & Simon	#1–6	Jan 2019 – Jun 2019	Limited series	
Adventure Time with Fionna and Cake		#1–6	Jan 2013 – Jun 2013	Limited series	
Adventure Time with Fionna and Cake	Card Wars	#1–6	Jul 2015 – Dec 2015	Limited series	
Adventure Time with Fionna and Cake	Party Bash Blues	nn	Aug 2019	Graphic novel	
Adventure Time/Regular Show		#1–6	Aug 2017 – Jan 2018	Limited series	
Alice in Wonderland		nn	Jul 2010	Graphic novel; adaptation of the 2010 film	
Alice Ever After		#1–6	Apr 2022 – Aug 2022	Limited series	
Alice: From Dream to Dream		nn	Sep 2018	Graphic novel	
Alienated		#1–6	Feb 2020 – Sep 2020	Limited series	
Aliens vs. Parker		#1–4	Mar 2013 – May 2013	Limited series	
All New Firefly		#1–10	Feb 2022 – Nov 2022	Limited series	
The Amazing World of Gumball		#1—7	Jun 2014 — Mar 2015	Limited series; based on TV series	
The Amazing World of Gumball	2015 Special	#1	Jan 2015		
The Amazing World of Gumball	Adventures in Elmore	nn	May 2019	Graphic novel	
The Amazing World of Gumball	After School Special	nn	Sep 2017	Graphic novel	
The Amazing World of Gumball	Cheat Code	nn	Jun 2016	Graphic novel	
The Amazing World of Gumball	Fairy Tale Trouble	nn	Nov 2015	Graphic novel	
The Amazing World of Gumball	Grab Bag Special	2015	Sep 2015		
The Amazing World of Gumball	Grab Bag Special	2016	Aug 2016		
The Amazing World of Gumball	Grab Bag Special	2017	Aug 2017		
The Amazing World of Gumball	Grab Bag Special	2018	Aug 2018		
The Amazing World of Gumball	Midsummer Nightmare	nn	Jan 2019	Graphic novel	
The Amazing World of Gumball	Recipe for Disaster	nn	May 2017	Graphic novel	
The Amazing World of Gumball	Scrimmage Scramble	nn	Mar 2018	Graphic novel	
The Amazing World of Gumball	Spring Break Smash	#1	Feb 2019		
The Amazing World of Gumball	The Storm	nn	Aug 2019	Graphic novel	
The Amazing World of Gumball	Tunnel Kingdom	nn	Sep 2018	Graphic novel	
Americatown		#1–8	Aug 2015 – Nov 2015	Limited series; published under the Archaia Entertainment imprint	
The Amory Wars	In Keeping Secrets of Silent Earth: 3	#1–12	May 2010 – Jun 2011	Limited series	
The Amory Wars	Good Apollo, I'm Burning Star IV	#1–12	Apr 2017 – Oct 2018	Limited series	
The Anchor		#1–8	Oct 2009 – May 2010	Limited series	
Angel	vol. 1	#0–8	Apr 2019 – Nov 2020	Ongoing series; based on the TV series; previously published by Dark Horse and IDW	
Angel	+ Spike	#9–16	Apr 2019 – Nov 2020	Ongoing series; based on the TV series; previously published by Dark Horse and IDW	
Angel	vol. 2	#1–8	Jan 2022 – Aug 2022	Limited series	
Arcadia		#1–5	May 2015 – Feb 2016	Limited series	
The Avant-Guards		#1–8	Jan 2019 – Sep 2019	Limited series	
The Avengefuls		#1	Apr 2012	One-shot	

== B ==
Title	Series	Issues	Dates	Notes	Reference
b.b. free		#1–3	Nov 2019 – Mar 2020	Limited series	
The Backstagers		#1–8	Aug 2016 – Mar 2017	Limited series	
The Backstagers	Halloween Intermission	#1	Oct 2018		
The Backstagers	2018 Valentine's Intermission	#1	Feb 2018		
Bags (or a Story Thereof)		nn	Jul 2019	Graphic novel	
The Baker Street Peculiars		#1–4	Mar 2016 – Jun 2016	Limited series	
Basilisk		#1–12	Jun 2021 – Oct 2022	Limited series	
Batman '66 Meets Steed and Mrs. Peel		#1–6	Sep 2016 – Feb 2017	Limited series; co-published with DC Comics.	
Bee and PuppyCat		#1–11	May 2014 – Apr 2016	Limited series; based on the web TV series.	
Behold Behemoth		#1–5	Nov 2022 – present	Limited series	
Ben 10	For Science!	nn	Jul 2019	Graphic novel; based on the 2016 reboot of the series.	
Ben 10	Mecha Madness	nn	Nov 2019	Graphic novel	
Ben 10	The Creature from Serenity Shore	nn	Aug 2020	Graphic novel	
Ben 10	The Manchester Mystery	nn	Mar 2020	Graphic novel	
Ben 10	The Truth is Out There	nn	Mar 2019	Graphic novel	
Beneath the Dark Crystal		#1–12	Jul 2018 – Aug 2019	Limited series; second sequel story to The Dark Crystal (1982), published under the Archaia Entertainment imprint.	
Better Angels: A Kate Warne Adventure		nn	Nov 2021	Graphic novel	
Betrayal of the Planet of the Apes		#1–4	Nov 2011 – Feb 2012	Limited series	
The Big Con Job		#1–4	Mar 2015 – Jun 2015	Limited series	
Big Trouble in Little China		#1–25	Jun 2014 – Jun 2016	Ongoing series; based on the 1986 film of the same title.	
Big Trouble in Little China	Old Man Jack	#1–12	Sep 2017 – Aug 2018	Limited series	
Big Trouble in Little China	Escape From New York	#1–6	Oct 2016 – Mar 2017	Limited series	
Bill & Ted	Go to Hell	#1–4	Feb 2016 – May 2016	Limited series; based on the film series.	
Bill & Ted	Save the Universe	#1–5	Jun 2017 – Oct 2017	Limited series; based on the film series.	
Bill & Ted	's Most Triumphant Return	#1–6	Mar 2015 – Aug 2015	Limited series; based on the film series.	
Black Badge		#1–12	Aug 2018 – Jul 2019	Limited series	
The Black Dahila		nn	Jun 2016	Graphic novel; based on the 1987 novel by James Ellroy, published under the Archaia Entertainment imprint.	
Black Market		#1–4	Jul 2014 – Oct 2014	Limited series	
The Black Plague		nn	Jul 2006	One-shot	
Blood Bowl: Killer Contract		#1–5	May 2008 – Oct 2008	Limited series	
Bodie Troll		nn	Feb 2018	Graphic novel	
Bone Parish		#1–12	Jul 2018 – Aug 2019	Limited series	
Book of Slaughter		nn	Dec 2022	One-shot	
Brave Chef Brianna		#1–4	Mar 2017 – Jun 2017	Limited series	
Bravest Warriors		#1–36	Oct 2012 – Sep 2015	Ongoing series; based on the web TV series.	
Bravest Warriors	2014 Annual	#1	Jan 2014	Annual	
Bravest Warriors	Impossibear Special	#1	Jun 2014		
Bravest Warriors	Paralyzed Horse Giant	#1	Nov 2014	One-shot	
Bravest Warriors	Tales from the Holo John	#1	May 2015	One-shot	
Briar		#1–8	Sep 2022 – present	Limited series	
Broken World		#1–4	Jun 2015 – Sep 2015	Limited series	
BRZRKR		#1–12	Feb 2021 – Mar 2023	Limited series	
BRZRKR Bloodlines Vol. 1	Poetry of Madness	#1	July 2023	One-shot	
BRZRKR Bloodlines Vol. 1	Fallen Empire	#1	Nov 2023	One-Shot	
BRZRKR Bloodlines Vol. 2	A Faceful of Bullets	#1	July 2024	One-shot	
BRZRKR Bloodlines Vol. 2	Lost Book of B	#1	Aug 2024	One-shot	
Buckhead		#1–5	Dec 2021 – Apr 2022	Limited series; published under the Boom! Box imprint.	
Buffy '97		#1	Jun 2022	One-shot	
Buffy the Last Vampire Slayer	Volume 1	#1–4	Dec 2021 – Mar 2022	Limited series	
Buffy the Last Vampire Slayer	Volume 2	#1–5	Aug 2023 – Dec 2023	Limited Series	
Buffy the Last Vampire Slayer	Special	#1	Mar 2023	One-Shot	
Buffy the Last Vampire Slayer	The Lost Summer			One-shot	
Buffy the Vampire Slayer		#1–34	Jan 2019 – Feb 2022	Ongoing series; based on the TV series, previously published by Dark Horse Comics.	
Buffy the Vampire Slayer	Chosen Ones	#1	Aug 2019	One-shot	
Buffy the Vampire Slayer	Every Generation	#1	Apr 2020	One-shot	
Buffy the Vampire Slayer	Faith	#1	Feb 2021	One-shot	
Buffy the Vampire Slayer	Tea Time	#1	Jun 2021	One-shot	
Buffy the Vampire Slayer	The 25th Anniversary	#1	Mar 2022	One-shot	
Buffy the Vampire Slayer	Willow	#1	Jul 2020	One-shot	
Buffy the Vampire Slayer		#1–16	Apr 2022 – Jul 2023	Limited Series	
Burning Fields		#1–8	Jan 2015 – Sep 2015	Limited series	
Bury the Lede		nn	Oct 2019	Graphic novel	
Butterfly		#1–4	Sep 2014 – Dec 2014	Limited series	
By Night		#1–12	Jun 2018 – Jun 2019	Limited series	

== C ==
Title	Series	Issues	Dates	Notes	Reference
The Calling: Cthulhu Chronicles		#1–4	July 2010 – Oct 2010	Limited series; based on the short story "The Call of Cthulhu" by H. P. Lovecraft.	
Caped		#1–4	Mar 2009 – Jul 2009	Limited series	
Captain American Idol		#1	Feb 2012	One-shot	
Capture Creatures		#1–4	Nov 2014 – May 2015	Limited series	
Cars		#1–7	Nov 2009 – Jun 2010	Limited series; based on the Disney/Pixar film.	
Cars	Adventures of Tow Mater	#1–4	Jul 2010 – Oct 2010	Limited series; based on the Disney/Pixar film.	
CBGB		#1–4	Jul 2010 – Oct 2010	Limited series; inspired by the former New York City music club, that ran from 1973 until 2006.	
Challenger Deep		#1–4	Jul 2008 – Oct 2008	Limited series	
Chip 'n Dale Rescue Rangers		#1–8	Dec 2010 – Jul 2011	Limited series; based on the TV series.	
Clarence		#1–4	Jun 2016 – Sep 2015	Limited series; based on the TV series.	
Clarence	Chicken Phantom	nn	May 2016	Graphic novel	
Clarence	Getting Gilben	nn	April 2017	Graphic novel	
Clarence	Quest	#1	Jun 2016	One-shot	
Clarence	Rest Stops	#1	Dec 2015	One-shot	
Clive Barker's	Next Testament	#1–12	May 2013 – Aug 2014	Limited series	
Clive Barker's	Nightbreed	#1–12	May 2014 – Apr 2015	Limited series; based on the author's 1988 novella Cabal and the eponymous 1990 film.	
Cloaks		#1–4	Sep 2014 – Dec 2014	Limited series	
The Cloud		nn	Jul 2016	Graphic novel; published under the Archaia Entertainment imprint.	
Clueless	One Last Summer	nn	Nov 2018	One-shot; based on the Paramount Pictures film.	
Clueless	Senior Year	nn	Aug 2017	Graphic novel; based on the Paramount Pictures film.	
Cluster		#1–8	Feb 2015 – Oct 2015	Limited series	
Coady and the Creepies		#1–8	Mar 2017 – Jun 2017	Limited series	
Coda		#1–12	May 2018 – May 2019	Limited series	
Codebreakers		#1–4	Apr 2010 – Jul 2010	Limited series	
Cognetic		#1–3	Oct 2015 – Dec 2015	Limited series	
Cold Space		#1–4	Apr 2010 – Jul 2010	Limited series	
Cover Girl		#1–5	May 2007 – Sep 2007	Limited series	
Cthulhu Tales	vol. 1	#1	Jul 2006	One-shot	
Cthulhu Tales	vol. 2	#1–12	May 2008 – Mar 2009	Limited series	
Cthulhu Tales	Tainted	#1	Sep 2006	One-shot	
Cthulhu Tales	The Rising	#1	Feb 2007	One-shot	
Curb Stomp		#1–4	Feb 2015 – May 2015	Limited series	
Curse		#1–4	Jan 2014 – Apr 2014	Limited series; an exclusive Emerald City Comic Con variant cover of #1 by Colin Lorimer, was published in July 16 that year.	
Cursed Pirate Girl	The Devil's Cave	nn	Jan 2022	One-shot	
Cursed Pirate Girl	2015 Annual	#1	Oct 2022	One-shot	

== D ==
Title	Series	Issues	Dates	Notes	Reference
Damn Them All		#1–12	Oct 2022 – Jan 2024	Ongoing series	
Dark Blood		#1–6	Jul 2021 – Jan 2022	Limited series	
The Dark Crystal: Age of Resistance		#1–12	Sep 2019 – Oct 2020	Limited series; based on the streaming TV series.	
Darkwing Duck		#1–18	Jun 2010 – Oct 2011	Limited series; based on the TV series.	
Darkwing Duck	Annual	#1	Mar 2011	Annual	
Dawn of the Planet of the Apes	Contagion	#1	Jul 2014	One-shot	
Dawn of the Planet of the Apes		#1–6	Nov 2014 – Apr 2015	Limited series; movie tie-in.	
Day Men		#1–8	Jul 2013 – Oct 2015	Limited series	
Dead Letters		#1–12	Apr 2014 – Dec 2016	Limited series	
Dead Run		#1–4	Jun 2009 – Sep 2009	Limited series	
Death Be Damned		#1–4	Feb 2017 – May 2017	Limited series	
Deathmatch		#1–12	Dec 2012 – Nov 2013	Limited series	
Deceivers		#1–6	Dec 2013 – Jun 2014	Limited series	
Decision 2012	Barack Obama	#1	Nov 2011	One-shot	
Decision 2012	Michele Bachmann	#1	Nov 2011	One-shot	
Decision 2012	Ron Paul	#1	Nov 2011	One-shot	
Decision 2012	Sarah Palin	#1	Nov 2011	One-shot	
The Deep		#1–6	Jan 2017 – Jun 2017	Limited series	
Deep State		#1–8	Nov 2014 – Jul 2015	Limited series	
Die Hard: Year One		#1–8	Aug 2009 – Mar 2010	Limited series; based on the film series.	
Dingo		#1–4	Dec 2009 – Mar 2010	Limited series	
Diesel		#1–5	Sep 2015 – Dec 2015	Limited series; published under the Boom! Box imprint.	
Diesel	Gear Shift Special	#1	Oct 2017	One-shot	
Diesel	Ignition	nn	Dec 2016	Graphic novel	
Disney's Hero Squad: Ultraheroes		#1–8	Jan 2010 – Aug 2010	Limited series	
Do Androids Dream of Electric Sheep?		#1–24	Jun 2009 – May 2011	Limited series; based on the 1967 novel by Philip K. Dick.	
Do Androids Dream of Electric Sheep?	Dust to Dust	#1–8	May 2010 – Dec 2010	Limited series	
Dodge City		#1–4	Mar 2018 – Jun 2018	Limited series	
Dominion		#1–5	May 2007 – Jan 2008	Limited series	
Donald Duck	and Friends	#347–362	Oct 2009 – Jan 2011	Ongoing series; previously published by Dell, Gold Key, Disney, Gladstone, Gemstone and Boom! Studios and resumed from #346.	
Donald Duck		#363–367	Feb 2011 – Jun 2011	Ongoing series; previously published by Dell, Gold Key, Disney, Gladstone, Gemstone and Boom! Studios and resumed from #346.	
Dracula: The Company of Monsters		#1–12	Aug 2010 – Jul 2011	Limited series; based on the eponymous character from the 1897 novel Dracula by Bram Stoker.	
DuckTales		#1–6	May 2011 – Oct 2011	Limited series; based on the TV series.	
Dune	A Whisper of Caladan Seas	#1	Dec 2021	One-shot; based on the Dune novel series by Frank Herbert.	
Dune	Blood of the Sardaukar	#1	Jul 2021	One-shot	
Dune	House Atreides	#1–12	Oct 2020 – Dec 2021	Limited series	
Dune	House Harkonnen	#1–12	Jan 2023 – Jan 2024	Limited series	
Dune	The Waters of Kanly	#1–4	May 2022 – Aug 2022	Limited series	
Dune	House Carrino	#1-	Mar 2024 – Ongoing	Limited Series	

== E ==
Title	Series	Issues	Dates	Notes	Reference
Eat and Love Yourself		nn	Jul 2020	Graphic novel	
Eat the Rich		#1–5	Aug 2021 – Dec 2021	Limited series	
Eighty Days		nn	Sep 2021	Graphic novel	
Elric: The Balance Lost		#1–12	Jul 2011 – Jun 2012	Limited series	
The Empty Man	vol. 1	#1–6	Jun 2014 – Dec 2014	Limited series	
The Empty Man	vol. 2	#1–8	Nov 2018 – Jun 2019	Limited series	
Enigma Cipher		#1–2	Nov 2006 – Aug 2007	Limited series	
Enter the House of Slaughter		nn	Aug 2021	Free Comic Book Day issue; related to House of Slaughter.	
Escape from New York		#1–16	Dec 2014 – Apr 2016	Limited series; based on the 1981 film of the same title.	
Eternal		#1–4	Dec 2014 – Apr 2015	Limited series	
Eugenic		#1–3	Oct 2017 – Dec 2017	Limited series	
Eureka		#1–4	Dec 2008 – Mar 2009	Limited series; based on the TV series.	
Eureka	Dormant Gene	#1–4	April – Jul 2009	Limited series	
Eve		#1–5	May 2021 – Sep 2021	Limited series	
Eve	Children of the Moon	#1–5	Oct 2022 – Feb 2023	Limited series	
Evil Empire		#1–12	Mar 2014 – Apr 2015	Limited series	
Exile on the Planet of the Apes		#1–4	Mar 2012 – Jun 2012	Limited series	
The Expanse	Origins	#1–5	Feb 2017 – Feb 2018	Limited series; based on the novel and TV series.	
The Expanse		#1–4	Dec 2020 – Mar 2021	Limited series; based on the novel and TV series.	
The Expanse	Dragon Tooth	#1–12	Apr 2023 – May 2024	Limited series; based on the novel and TV series.	
The Expanse	A Little Death	#1–4	Sep 2025 – Ongoing	Limited series; based on the novel and TV series.	
Extermination		#1–8	Jun 2012 – Jan 2013	Limited series	

== F ==
Title	Series	Issues	Dates	Notes	Reference
Fairy Quest	Outcasts	#1–2	Nov 2014 – Dec 2014	Limited series	
Fairy Quest	Outlaws	#1–2	Feb 2013 – Mar 2013	Limited series	
Faithless		#1–6	Apr 2019 – Sep 2019	Limited series	
Faithless	II	#1–6	Apr 2020 – Nov 2020	Limited series	
Faithless	III	#1–6	Feb 2022 – Jul 2022	Limited series	
Fanboys vs. Zombies		#1–20	Apr 2012 – Nov 2013	Limited series; written by Sam Humphries.	
Fall of Cthulhu		#0–14	Mar 2007 – Jun 2008	Limited series	
Fall of Cthulhu	Apocalypse	#1–4	Nov 2008 – Feb 2009	Limited series	
Fall of Cthulhu	Godwar	#1–4	Jul 2008 – Nov 2008	Limited series	
Fall of Cthulhu	Nemesis	#1–4	Apr 2009 – Jul 2009	Limited series	
Farscape	vol. 1	#1–4	Nov 2008 – Feb 2009	Limited series; based on the TV series.	
Farscape	vol. 2	#1–24	Nov 2009 – Oct 2011	Ongoing series; based on the TV series.	
Farscape	D'Argo's Lament	#1–4	Apr 2009 – Jul 2009	Limited series	
Farscape	D'Argo's Quest	#1–4	Dec 2009 – Mar 2010	Limited series	
Farscape	D'Argo's Trial	#1–4	Aug 2009 – Nov 2009	Limited series	
Farscape	Gone and Back	#1–4	Jul 2009 – Oct 2009	Limited series	
Farscape	Scorpius	#0–7	Apr 2010 – Nov 2010	Limited series	
Farscape	Strange Detractors	#1–4	May 2009 – Jun 2009	Limited series	
Fear the Dead: A Zombie Survivors Journal		#1	Apr 2006	One-shot	
Feathers		#1–6	Jan 2015 – Jun 2015	Limited series	
Fence		#1–12	Nov 2017 – Nov 2018	Limited series	
The Fiction		#1–4	Jun 2015 – Sep 2015	Limited series	
Fiction Squad		#1–6	Oct 2014 – Mar 2015	Limited series	
Finding Nemo	Reef Rescue	#1–4	May 2009 – Jul 2009	Limited series; based on the Disney/Pixar film.	
Finding Nemo	Losing Dory	#1–4	Jul 2010 – Oct 2010	Limited series; based on the Disney/Pixar film.	
Firefly		#1–36	Nov 2018 – Jan 2022	Ongoing series; based on the TV series.	
Firefly	20th Anniversary Special	#1	Aug 2022	One-shot	
Firefly	Bad Company	#1	Mar 2019	One-shot; storyline continued through issues #5–12 and a bonus Free Comic Book Day 2019 issue (in between #6–7) in the ongoing series.	
Firefly	Blue Sun Rising	#0–1	Sep 2020 – Dec 2020	Limited series; storyline progressed in between issues through #21–24 in the ongoing series.	
Firefly	Brand New 'Verse	#1–6	Mar 2021 – Aug 2021	Limited series	
Firefly	Keep Flying	#1	Nov 2022	One-shot	
Firefly	River Run	#1	Sep 2021	One-shot	
Firefly	The Holiday Special	#1	Dec 2021	One-shot	
Firefly	The Outlaw Ma Reynolds	#1	Jan 2020	One-shot; storyline continued through issues 13–20 in the ongoing series.	
Firefly	The Sting	nn	Nov 2019	Graphic novel	
Firefly	Watch How I Soar	nn	Nov 2020	Graphic novel	
Flavor Girls		#1–3	Jul 2020 – Sep 2020	Limited series	
Folklords		#1–5	Nov 2019 – Mar 2020	Limited series	
Forever Home		nn	Feb 2021	Graphic novel	
The Foundation		#1–5	Dec 2007 – Apr 2008	Limited series	
Fraggle Rock		#1–4	May 2018 – Aug 2018	Limited series; based on the TV series, published under the Archaia Entertainment imprint.	
Fraggle Rock	Journey to the Everspring	#1–4	Oct 2014 – Jan 2015	Limited series; published under the Archaia Entertainment imprint.	
Freelancers		#1–6	Oct 2012 – Mar 2013	Limited series	
Fresh Off the Boat Presents: Legion of Dope-itude Featuring Lazy Boy		nn	May 2007	Free Comic Book Day 2017 issue; based on the TV series.	
Fused! Tales		#1	Nov 2006	One-shot	

== G ==
Title	Series	Issues	Dates	Notes	Reference
G.I. Spy		#1	Jan 2005		
Galveston		#1–4	Sep 2008 – Feb 2009	Limited series	
Garfield		#1–32	May 2012 – Dec 2014	Ongoing series	
Garfield	2016 Summer Special	#1	Jul 2016		
Garfield	Garzilla	nn	May 2020	Graphic novel	
Garfield	His 9 Lives	#33–36	Jan 2015 – Apr 2015	Limited series	
Garfield	Homecoming	#1–4	Jun 2018 – Sep 2018	Limited series	
Garfield	Search for Pooky	nn	Apr 2018	Graphic novel	
Garfield	The Thing in the Fridge	nn	Apr 2018	Graphic novel	
Garfield	The Monday That Wouldn't End	nn	Apr 2019	Graphic novel	
Garfield	Trouble in Paradise	nn	Sep 2018	Graphic novel	
Garfield	TV or Not TV?	#1	Oct 2018	One-shot	
Garfield	Unreality TV	nn	May 2017	Graphic novel	
Garfield	Vacation Time Blues	#1	May 2018	One-shot	
Garfield's	Big Fat Hairy Adventure	nn	Oct 2016	Graphic novel	
Garfield's	Cheesy Holiday Special	#1	Dec 2015		
Garfield's	Pet Force Special	#1	Aug 2013		
Getting Dizzy		#1–4	Nov 2021 – Feb 2022	Limited series	
Ghosted in L.A.		#1–12	Jul 2019 – Aug 2020	Limited series	
Giant Days		#1–54	Mar 2015 – Sep 2019	Ongoing series; spin-off of the 2002 webcomic Scary Go Round.	
Giant Days	2016 Holiday Special	#1	Oct 2016		
Giant Days	As Time Goes By	#1	Oct 2019		
Giant Days	2017 Holiday Special	#1	Nov 2017		
Giant Days	Where Women Glow and Men Plunder	#1	Dec 2018		
Giant Monster		#1–2	Oct 2005 – Nov 2005	Limited series	
Go Go Power Rangers		#1–32	Jul 2017 – Jun 2020	Ongoing series	
Go Go Power Rangers	Back to School	#1	Sep 2018	One-shot	
Go Go Power Rangers	Forever Rangers	#1	Jun 2018	One-shot	
Godshaper		#1–6	Apr 2017 – Sep 2017	Limited series	
Godzilla vs. Mighty Morphin Power Rangers		#1–4	Mar 2022 – Aug 2022	Limited series; co-published with IDW Publishing.	
Goldie Vance		#1–12	Apr 2016 – May 2017	Limited series; later moved to trade paperbacks.	
Good Luck		#1–5	Jun 2021 – Oct 2021	Limited series	
Grass Kings		#1–15	Mar 2017 – Mar 2018	Limited series	
The Graveyard Club	Revenge Game	#1	Sept 17, 2024	Graphic novel	
The Great Wiz and the Ruckus		nn	Feb 2019	Graphic novel	
Grumpy Cat/Garfield		#1–3	Aug 2017 – Oct 2017	Limited series; co-published with Dynamite Entertainment.	

== H ==
Title	Series	Issues	Dates	Notes	Reference
Hacktivist	vol. 1	#1–4	Jan 2014 – Apr 2014	Limited series; published under the Archaia Entertainment imprint	
Hacktivist	vol. 2	#1–6	Jul 2015 – Dec 2015	Limited series	
Halogen		#1–4	Mar 2015 – Jun 2015	Limited series	
Happiness Will Follow		nn	Aug 2020	Graphic novel	
Harrower		#1–4	Feb 2023 – May 2023	Limited series	
Hawken: Melee		#1–5	Dec 2013 – Jan 2014	Limited series; published under the Archaia Entertainment imprint	
Hawks of Outremer		#1–4	Jun 2010 – Sep 2010	Limited series	
Heartbeat		#1–5	Nov 2019 – Mar 2020	Limited series	
Hellmouth – A Buffy + Angel Event		#1–5	Oct 2019 – Feb 2020	Limited series	
Help Us! Great Warrior		#1–6	Feb 2015 – Jul 2015	Limited series; published under the Boom Box imprint	
Hellraiser		#1–20	Mar 2011 – Nov 2012	Ongoing series	
Hellraiser	2013 Annual	#1	Oct 2013		
Hellraiser	Annual	#1	Mar 2012		
Hellraiser	Bestiary	#1–6	Aug 2014 – Jan 2015	Limited series	
Hellraiser	Masterpieces	#1–12	Nov 2011 – Apr 2012	Reprint series collecting the 1989–1992 Epic Comics series	
Hellraiser	The Dark Watch	#1–12	Feb 2013 – Jan 2014	Limited series	
Hellraiser	The Road Below	#1–4	Oct 2012 – Jan 2013	Limited series	
Hero Squared	vol. 1	#1–3	Aug 2005 – Nov 2005	Limited series; the inaugural publication from Boom! Studios, this title follows on from the one-shot X-Tra Sized Special published by Atomeka Press in 2004	
Hero Squared	vol. 2	#1–6	May 2006 – May 2007	Limited series	
Hero Squared	Love and Death	#1–3	Dec 2008 – May 2009	Limited series	
Herobear and the Kid	2016 Fall Special	#1	Oct 2016		
Herobear and the Kid	Saving Time	#1	Apr 2014		
Herobear and the Kid	Special	#1	Jun 2013		
Hex Vet	The Flying Surgery	nn	Dec 2019	Graphic novel	
Hex Vet	Witches in Training	nn	Dec 2018	Graphic novel	
Hexed	vol. 1	#1–4	Dec 2008 – Mar 2009	Limited series	
Hexed	vol. 2	#1–12	Aug 2014 – Aug 2015	Limited series	
Hi-Fi Fight Club		#1–4	Aug 2017 – Nov 2017	Limited series; the title was renamed to Heavy Vinyl for the fourth and final issue in the series	
High Rollers		#1–4	Jun 2008 – Sep 2008	Limited series	
Higher Earth		#1–9	May 2012 – Jan 2013	Limited series	
Hit	vol. 1	#1–4	Sep 2013 – Dec 2013	Limited series	
Hit	1957	#1–4	Mar 2015 – Jul 2015	Limited series	
Hollow		–	Sep 2022	Graphic novel	
Hotel Dare		–	Jun 2019	Graphic novel	
House of Slaughter		#1–15	Oct 2021 – May 2023	Ongoing series	
Hunter's Fortune		#1–4	Oct 2009 – Jan 2010	Limited series	
Hunter's Moon		#1–5	Apr 2007 – Feb 2008	Limited series	
The Hypernaturals		#1–12	Jul 2012 – Jun 2013	Limited series	

== I ==
Title	Series	Issues	Dates	Notes	Reference
I Moved to Los Angeles to Work in Animation		nn	Dec 2018	Graphic novel	
Ice Age	Iced In	nn	Dec 2011	Graphic novel	
Ice Age	Past, Presents, and Future!	nn	Oct 2012	Graphic novel	
Ice Age	Playing Favorites	nn	Mar 2012	Graphic novel	
Ice Age	The Hidden Treasure	nn	Mar 2013	Graphic novel	
Ice Age	Where There's Thunder	nn	May 2012	Graphic novel	
Imagine Agents		#1–30	Oct 2013 – Jan 2014	Ongoing series	
Incorruptible		#1–30	Dec 2009 – May 2012	Ongoing series	
The Incredibles	vol. 1	#1–4	Mar 2009 – Jun 2009	Limited series; based on the Disney/Pixar film.	
The Incredibles	vol. 2	#0–15	Jul 2009 – Oct 2010	Ongoing series; based on the Disney/Pixar film.	
Insurrection v3.6		#1–4	Mar 2011 – Jun 2011	Limited series	
Interesting Drug		nn	May 2014	Graphic novel	
Irredeemable		#1–37	Apr 2009 – May 2012	Ongoing series	
Irredeemable	Special	#1	Apr 2010		
Iron Muslim		#1	Apr 2012	One-shot	
Iscariot		nn	Oct 2015	Graphic novel	

== J ==
Title	Series	Issues	Dates	Notes	Reference
Jane		–	Sep 2017	Graphic novel; published under the Archaia Entertainment imprint	
Jennifer's Body		–	Aug 2009	Graphic novel; movie tie-in	
Jenny Finn: Messiah		–	Oct 2005	Graphic novel; continuation of a two-issue limited series published by Oni Press from June 16 – September 22, 1999, later reprinted by Atomeka Press in April 20, 2005 under the title Jenny Finn: Doom.	
Jeremiah Harm		#1–5	Feb 2006 – Nov 2006	Limited series	
Jo & Rus		–	Feb 2021	Graphic novel	
John Flood		#1–12	Aug 2015 – Jan 2016	Limited series	
Jonesy		#1–12	Feb 2016 – Apr 2017	Limited series; published under the Boom Box imprint	
The Joyners		#1–4	Jun 2016 – Sep 2016	Graphic novel	
Joyride		#1–12	Apr 2016 – Apr 2017	Limited series	
Judas		#1–4	Dec 2017 – Mar 2018	Limited series	
Juliet Takes a Breath		–	Nov 2020	Graphic novel	
Just Beyond	Monstrosity	–	Oct 2021	Graphic novel	
Just Beyond	The Horror at Happy Landings	–	Jun 2020	Graphic novel	
Just Beyond	The Scare School	–	Aug 2019	Graphic novel	
Just Beyond	Welcome to Beast Island	–	Oct 2020	Graphic novel	
Justice League/Mighty Morphin Power Rangers		#1–6	Mar 2017 – Nov 2017	Limited series; co-published with DC Comics	

== K ==
Title	Series	Issues	Dates	Notes	Reference
Kennel Block Blues		#1–4	Feb 2016 – May 2016	Limited series	
Key of Z		#1–4	Dec 2011 – Jan 2012	Limited series	
Kill Audio		#1–6	Oct 2009 – May 2010	Limited series	
The Killer: Affairs of the State		#1–6	Feb 2022 – Jul 2022	Limited series; tie-in to the Netflix film.	
King of Nowhere		#1–5	Mar 2020 – Sep 2020	Limited series	
Klaus		#1–7	Nov 2015 – Aug 2016	Limited series	
Klaus	and the Crisis in Xmasville	#1	Dec 2017	One-shot	
Klaus	and the Crying Snowman	#1	Dec 2018	One-shot	
Klaus	and the Life & Times of Joe Christmas	#1	Dec 2019	One-shot	
Klaus	and the Witch of Winter	#1	Dec 2016	One-shot	
Kong of Skull Island		#1–12	Jul 2016 – Jun 2017	Limited series	
Kong of Skull Island	2018 Special	#1	May 2018		
Kong: Gods of Skull Island		#1	Oct 2017	Limited series	
Kong on the Planet of the Apes		#1–6	Nov 2017 – Apr 2018	Limited series	

== L ==
Title	Series	Issues	Dates	Notes	Reference
Labyrinth	30th Anniversary Special	#1	Aug 2016	One-shot; published under the Archaia Entertainment imprint	
Labyrinth	Coronation	#1–12	Feb 2018 – Mar 2019	Limited series; published under the Archaia Entertainment imprint	
Labyrinth	Masquerade	#1	Dec 2020	One-shot; published under the Archaia Entertainment imprint	
Labyrinth	2017 Special	#1	Nov 2017	One-shot; published under the Archaia Entertainment imprint	
Labyrinth	Under the Spell	#1	Nov 2018	One-shot; published under the Archaia Entertainment imprint	
Ladycastle		#1–4	Jan 2017 – May 2017	Limited series; art by Ashley A. Woods	
The Last Broadcast		#1–7	May 2014 – Nov 2014	Limited series	
The Last Contract		#1–4	Jan 2016 – Apr 2016	Limited series	
Last Reign: Kings of War		#1–5	Oct 2008 – March 2009	Limited series	
Last Sons of America		#1–4	Nov 2015 – Apr 2016	Limited series	
The Last Witch		#1–5	Jan 2021 – May 2021	Limited series	
Lazaretto		#1–5	Sep 2017 – Jan 2018	Limited series	
Left on Mission		#1–5	Apr 2007 – Nov 2007	Limited series	
Loki: Ragnarok and Roll		#1–4	Feb 2014 – Jun 2014	Limited series	
Low Road West		#1–5	Sep 2018 – Jan 2019	Limited series	
Lucas Stand		#1–6	Jun 2016 – Nov 2016	Limited series	
Lucas Stand	Inner Demons	#1–4	Feb 2018 – May 2018	Limited series; sequel	
Lucy Dreaming		#1–5	Mar 2018 – Jul 2018	Limited series	
Lumberjanes		#1–75	Apr 2014 – Nov 2020	Ongoing series	
Lumberjanes	A Midsummer Night's Scheme	#1	August 2018	One-shot	
Lumberjanes	Beyond Bay Leaf	#1	Oct 2015	One-shot	
Lumberjanes	End of Summer	#1	Dec 2020	One-shot	
Lumberjanes	Faire and Square	#1	Jun 2017	One-shot	
Lumberjanes	Farewell to Summer FCDB	#1	Aug 2020	One-shot	
Lumberjanes	Makin' the Ghost of It	#1	May 2016	One-shot	
Lumberjanes	Shape of Friendship FCDB	#1	May 2019	One-shot	
Lumberjanes	Somewhere That's Green	#1	May 2019	One-shot	
Lumberjanes/Gotham Academy		#1–6	Jun 2016 – Nov 2016	Limited series; co-published with DC Comics	
Luna		#1–5	Feb 2021 – Jun 2021	Limited series	

== M ==
Title	Series	Issues	Dates	Notes	Reference
Magic		#1–25	Apr 2021 – Apr 2023	Ongoing series	
Magic	Ajani Goldmane	#1	Aug 2022	One-shot	
Magic	Master of Metal	#1	Nov 2021	One-shot	
Magic	Nahiri the Lithomancer	#1	Nov 2022	One-shot	
Magic	The Hidden Planeswalker	#1–4	Apr 2022 – Jul 2022	Limited series	
The Magicians		#1–5	Nov 2019 – Mar 2020	Limited series	
Malignant Man		#1—4	April—July 2011	Limited series	
Mamo		#1–5	Jul 2021 – Nov 2021	Limited series	
The Man Who Came Down the Attic Stairs		nn	Sep 2019	Graphic novel; published under the Archaia Entertainment imprint.	
The Many Deaths of Lalia Starr		#1–5	Apr 2021 – Sep 2021	Limited series	
Maw		#1–4	Sep 2021 – Jan 2022	Limited series	
Maze Runner	The Death Cure: Official Graphic Novel Prelude	nn	Nov 2017	Graphic novel; movie tie-in.	
Maze Runner	The Scorch Trials: Official Graphic Novel Prelude	nn	Jun 2015	Graphic novel; movie tie-in.	
Mech Cadet YU		#1–12	Aug 2017 – Sep 2018	Limited series	
Mega Man: Fully Charged		#1–6	Aug 2020 – Jan 2021	Limited series; based on the TV series.	
Mega Princess		#1–5	Nov 2016 – Apr 2016	Limited series	
Memetic		#1–3	Oct 2014 – Nov 2014	Limited series	
Mezolith: Stone Age Dreams and Nightmares	Book 1	nn	Feb 2016	Graphic novel	
Mezolith: Stone Age Dreams and Nightmares	Book 2	nn	Sep 2016	Graphic novel	
Mickey Mouse	and Friends	#296–303	Sep 2009 – Dec 2010	Ongoing series; previously published by Dell, Gold Key, Disney, Gladstone and Gemstone and resumed from issue #295.	
Mickey Mouse		#304–309	Jan 2011 – Jun 2011	Ongoing series; previously published by Dell, Gold Key, Disney, Gladstone and Gemstone and resumed from issue #295.	
Midas Flesh		#1–8	Dec 2013 – Jul 2014	Limited series; published under the Boom! Box imprint.	
Mighty Morphin		#1–22	Nov 2020 – Aug 2022	Ongoing series	
Mighty Morphin Power Rangers	vol. 1	#0–55	Jan 2016 – Oct 2020	Ongoing series	
Mighty Morphin Power Rangers	vol. 2	#100–present	Sep 2022 – present	Ongoing series	
Mighty Morphin Power Rangers	2016 Annual	#1	Aug 2016	Annual	
Mighty Morphin Power Rangers	2017 Annual	#1	May 2017	Annual	
Mighty Morphin Power Rangers	2018 Annual	#1	Apr 2018	Annual	
Mighty Morphin Power Rangers	25th Anniversary Special	#1	Jun 2018	One-shot	
Mighty Morphin Power Rangers	Pink	#1—5	Jun 2016 – Jan 2017	Limited series	
Mighty Morphin Power Rangers	Shattered Grid	FCDB	May 2018		
Mighty Morphin Power Rangers	Shattered Grid	#1	Aug 2018		
Mighty Morphin Power Rangers/Teenage Mutant Ninja Turtles	vol. 1	#0–5	Dec 2019 – Jun 2020	Limited series; co-published with IDW Publishing and Nickelodeon.	
Mighty Morphin Power Rangers/Teenage Mutant Ninja Turtles	II	#1–5	Dec 2022 – Apr 2023	Limited series; co-published with IDW Publishing and Nickelodeon.	
Misfit City		#1–8	May 2017 – Dec 2017	Limited series	
Monsters, Inc.: Laugh Factory		#1–4	Jun 2009 – Nov 2009	Limited series; based on the Disney/Pixar film.	
Mosely		#1–5	Jan 2023 – May 2023	Limited series	
Mouse Guard	Baldwin the Brave and Other Tales	#1	Nov 2014	Published under the Archaia Entertainment imprint.	
Mouse Guard	The Owlhen Caregiver & Other Tales	#1	Jul 2021	Published under the Archaia Entertainment imprint.	
Mouse Guard: Legends of the Guard	Volume Three	#1–4	Mar 2015 – Jun 2015	Limited series; published under the Archaia Entertainment imprint.	
Mr. Stuffins		#1–3	May 2007 – Jun 2009	Limited series; a reworked version of the first issue was published in April 2009.	
Munchkin		#1–25	Jan 2015 – Jan 2017	Limited series; published under the Boom! Box imprint.	
Munchkin	Deck the Dungeons	#1	Dec 2015	One-shot; published under the Boom! Box imprint.	
Muppet	King Arthur	#1–4	Feb 2009 – May 2010	Limited series	
Muppet	Peter Pan	#1–4	Aug 2009 – Nov 2009	Limited series	
Muppet	Robin Hood	#1–4	Apr 2009 – Jul 2009	Limited series	
Muppet	Sherlock Holmes	#1–4	Aug 2010 – December 8, 2010	Limited series	
Muppet	Snow White	#1–4	Apr 2010 – Aug 2010	Limited series	
The Muppet Show	vol. 1	#1–4	Mar 2009 – Jun 2009	Limited series	
The Muppet Show	vol. 2	#0–11	Nov 2009 – Oct 2010	Ongoing series	
The Muppet Show	The Treasure of Peg-Leg Wilson	#1–4	Jul 2006 – Oct 2009	Limited series	
The Musical Monsters of Turkey Hollow		nn	Oct 2014	Graphic novel	

== N ==
Title	Series	Issues	Dates	Notes	Reference
Namesake		#1–4	Nov 2016 – Feb 2017	Limited series	
Necronomicon		#1–4	Aug 2008 – Dec 2008	Limited series	
The Neighbors		#1–4	Mar 2023 – Jun 2023	Limited series	
Never as Bad as You Think		nn	Dec 2008	Graphic novel	
Ninja Tales		#1	Jan 2007		
Nola		#1–4	Nov 2009 – Feb 2010	Limited series	
North Wind		#1–5	Dec 2007 – Apr 2008	Limited series	
NTSF:SD:SUV:: – The Comic Book		#1	October 31, 2012	Based on TV series	
Nuclear Winter	vol. 1	nn	May 2018	Graphic novels; published under the Boom! Box imprint	
Nuclear Winter	vol. 2	nn	Jan 2019	Graphic novels; published under the Boom! Box imprint	
Nuclear Winter	vol. 3	nn	Sep 2019	Graphic novels; published under the Boom! Box imprint	

== O ==
Title	Series	Issues	Dates	Notes	Reference
Oh, Killstrike		#1–4	May 2015 – Aug 2015	Limited series	
Once & Future		#1–30	Aug 2019 – Oct 2022	Ongoing series	
Once Upon a Time at the End of the World		#1–5	Nov 2022 – Mar 2023	Limited series	
Operation: Broken Wings, 1936		#1–3	Nov 2011 – Jan 2012	Limited series	
Orcs!		#1–6	Feb 2021 – Jul 2021	Limited series	
Orcs!	The Curse	#1–4	Jun 2022 – Nov 2022	Limited series	
Origins		#1–6	Nov 2020 – Apr 2021	Limited series	
Over the Garden Wall	vol. 1	#1–4	Aug 2015 – Nov 2015	Limited series; based on TV series	
Over the Garden Wall	vol. 2	#1–20	Apr 2016 – Nov 2017	Ongoing series; based on TV series	
Over the Garden Wall	2017 Special	#1	Sep 2017		
Over the Garden Wall	and Into the Unknown	nn	Oct 2018	Halloween ComicFest exclusive	
Over the Garden Wall	Hollow Town	#1–5	Sep 2018 – Jan 2019	Limited series; based on TV series	
Over the Garden Wall	Soulful Symphonies	#1–5	Aug 2019 – Dec 2019	Limited series; based on TV series	
Over the Garden Wall	Special	#1	Nov 2014		

== P ==
Title	Series	Issues	Dates	Notes	Reference
Pale Horse		#1–4	Jun 2010 – Sep 2010	Limited series	
Pandora's Legacy		nn	Nov 2018	Graphic novel	
Peanuts	vol. 1	#0–4	Nov 2011 – Apr 2012	Limited series	
Peanuts	vol. 2	#1–32	Aug 2012 – Apr 2016	Ongoing series	
Peanuts	Friends Forever 2016 Special	#1	Jul 2016		
Peanuts	Race for Your Life, Charlie Brown	nn	Nov 2018	Graphic novel; movie adaptation	
Peanuts	Scotland Bound, Charlie Brown	nn	Apr 2021	Graphic novel; adapted from an unproduced storyboard	
Peanuts	The Snoopy Special	#1	Nov 2015		
Pirate Tales		#1	Oct 2006	One-shot	
Planet of the Apes		#1–16	Apr 2011 – Jul 2012	Ongoing series; based on film series	
Planet of the Apes	Annual	#1	Aug 2012	Annual	
Planet of the Apes	Cataclysm	#1–12	Sep 2012 – Aug 2013	Limited series	
Planet of the Apes	Giant	#1	Sep 2018	One-shot	
Planet of the Apes	Special	#1	Apr 2013	One-shot	
Planet of the Apes	Spectacular	#1	Jul 2018	One-shot	
Planet of the Apes	The Simian Age	#1	Dec 2018	One-shot	
Planet of the Apes	The Time of Man	#1	Oct 2018	One-shot	
Planet of the Apes	Ursus	#1–6	Jan 2018 – Jun 2018	Limited series	
Planet of the Apes	Visionaries	nn	Aug 2018	Graphic novel	
Planet of the Apes/Green Lantern		#1–6	Feb 2017 – Jul 2017	Limited series; co-published with DC Comics	
Planetary Brigade		#1–2	Jan 2006 – Feb 2006	Limited series	
Planetary Brigade	Origins	#1–3	Oct 2006 – Apr 2007	Limited series; prequel	
Plunder		#1–4	Feb 2015 – Jun 2015	Limited series	
Poe		#1–4	Jul 2009 – Oct 2009	Limited series	
Polarity		#1–4	Apr 2013 – Jul 2013	Limited series	
Potter's Field		#1–3	Sep 2007 – Dec 2007	Limited series	
Potter's Field	Stone Cold	nn	Mar 2009	One-shot	
The Power of the Dark Crystal		#1–12	Feb 2017 – Mar 2018	Limited series; published under the Archaia Entertainment imprint, sequel to The Dark Crystal (1982)	
Power Rangers		#1–22	Nov 2020 – Aug 2022	Ongoing series; based on TV franchise	
Power Rangers	Aftershock	nn	Mar 2017	Graphic novel; movie tie-in	
Power Rangers	Drakkon: New Dawn	#1–3	Aug 2020 – Oct 2020	Limited series	
Power Rangers	Universe	#1–6	Dec 2021 – May 2022	Limited series	
Power Rangers	Ranger Slayer	#1	Jul 2020	Limited series	
Power Rangers	Sins of the Future	nn	Oct 2020	Graphic novel	
Power Rangers	Soul of the Dragon	nn	Dec 2018	Graphic novel	
Power Rangers	The Psycho Path	nn	Oct 2019	Graphic novel	
Power Rangers	The Road to Ranger Slayer	#1	Jul 2020	Free Comic Book Day exclusive; prelude to Ranger Slayer	
Power Rangers Unlimited	Countdown to Ruin	#1	Jun 2022	One-shot	
Power Rangers Unlimited	The Death Ranger	#1	Aug 2022	One-shot	
Power Rangers Unlimited	Edge of Darkness	#1	Jun 2021	One-shot	
Power Rangers Unlimited	Heir to Darkness	#1	Mar 2021	One-shot	
Power Up		#1–6	Jul 2015 – Dec 2015	Limited series	
The Princess Who Saved	Her Friends	nn	Feb 2022	Graphic novel; sequel	
The Princess Who Saved	Herself	nn	May 2021	Graphic novel	
Proctor Valley Road		#1–5	Mar 2021 – Jul 2021	Limited series	
Protocol: Orphans		#1–4	Nov 2013 – Feb 2014	Limited series	
Pulp Tales: Josh Medors Benefit Comic		nn	Jul 2008	One-shot	

== R ==
Title	Series	Issues	Dates	Notes	Reference
Red Mother		#1–12	Dec 2019 – Jan 2021	Limited series	
Regarding the Matter of Oswald's Body		#1–5	Nov 2021 – Mar 2022	Limited series	
Regular Show		#1–40	Apr 2013 – Oct 2016	Ongoing series; based on TV series	
Regular Show	2015 March Madness Special	#1	Mar 2015		
Regular Show	2017 Special	#1	Apr 2017		
Regular Show	2018 Special	#1	Feb 2018		
Regular Show	25 Years Later	#1–6	Jun 2018 – Nov 2018	Limited series; based on TV series	
Regular Show	Skips	#1–6	Nov 2013 – Apr 2014	Limited series; based on TV series	
The Remnant		#1–4	Dec 2008 – Mar 2019	Limited series	
The Returning		#1–4	Mar 2014 – Jun 2014	Limited series	
Revelations	'	#1–6	Jan 2014 – Jun 2014	Limited series	
The Rinse		#1–4	Sep 2011 – Dec 2011	Limited series	
RoboCop		#1–12	Jul 2014 – Jun 2015	Limited series; based on film series	
RoboCop	Beta	#1	Feb 2014	Based on the 2014 film	
RoboCop	Citizens Arrest	#1–5	Apr 2018 – Aug 2018	Limited series; based on film series	
RoboCop	Hominem Ex Machina	#1	Feb 2014	Based on the 2014 film	
RoboCop	Last Stand	#1–8	Aug 2013 – Mar 2014	Limited series; based on Frank Miller's unproduced RoboCop 3 screenplay	
RoboCop	Memento Mori	#1	Feb 2014	Based on the 2014 film	
RoboCop	To Live and Die in Detroit	#1	Feb 2014	Based on the 2014 film	
Rocket Salvage		#1–5	Dec 2014 – Apr 2015	Limited series; published under the Archaia Entertainment imprint	
Rocko's Modern	Afterlife	#1–4	Apr 2019 – Jul 2019	Limited series; based on TV series	
Rocko's Modern	Life	#1–8	Dec 2017 – Sep 2018	Limited series; based on TV series	
Ronin Island		#1–12	Mar 2019 – Jul 2020	Limited series	
Rowans Ruin		#1–4	Oct 2015 – Jan 2016	Limited series	
Rugrats		#1–8	Oct 2017 – May 2018	Limited series; based on TV series	
Rugrats	Building Blocks	nn	Sep 2019	Graphic novel; based on TV series	
Rugrats	C Is For Chanukah	#1	Nov 2018	One-shot; based on TV series	
Rugrats	R Is For Reptar	#1	Apr 2018	One-shot; based on TV series	
Ruinworld		#1–5	Jul 2018 – Nov 2018	Limited series	
Run Wild		nn	Jul 2018	Graphic novel; published under the Archaia Entertainment imprint	
Rush: Clockwork Angels		#1–5	Mar 2014 – Nov 2014	Limited series; based on the 2012 studio album by Rush	

== S ==
Title	Series	Issues	Dates	Notes	Reference
Salem: Queen of Thorns		#0–4	Jan 2008 – Nov 2008	Limited series	
The Savage Brothers		#1–3	Jul 2006 – Jan 2007	Limited series	
Save Yourself!		#1–4	Jun 2021 – Sep 2021	Limited series	
Scienthorlogy		#1	Apr 2012	One-shot	
Scream Queen		#1–5	May 2008 – Oct 2008	Limited series	
Seven Psychopaths		#1–3	May 2010 – Jul 2010	Limited series	
Seven Secrets		#1—18	Aug 2020 – Jun 2022	Limited series	
Seven Warriors		#1–3	Nov 2011 – Jan 2012	Limited series	
Shmobots		nn	Jul 2008	Graphic novel	
Sirens		#1–6	Sep 2014 – Dec 2016	Limited series	
Six-Gun Gorilla		#1–6	Jun 2013 – Nov 2013	Limited series	
Skybourne		#1–6	Sep 2016 – Feb 2018	Limited series	
Slam!		#1–4	Nov 2016 – Feb 2014	Limited series; published under the Boom! Box imprint.	
Slam!	The Next Jam	#1–4	Sep 2017 – Dec 2017	Limited series; published under the Boom! Box imprint.	
Slaughterhouse-Five, or The Children's Crusade – A Graphic Novel Adaptation		nn	Sep 2020	Graphic novel; adaptation of the 1969 novel by Kurt Vonnegut.	
Sleepy Hollow		#1–4	Oct 2014 – Jan 2015	Limited series; based on the TV series.	
Sleepy Hollow	Origins	#1	Apr 2015	One-shot; based on the TV series.	
Sleepy Hollow	Providence	#1–4	Aug 2015 – Nov 2015	Limited series; based on the TV series.	
Smooth Criminals		#1–8	Nov 2018 – Aug 2019	Limited series	
Snarked!		#0–12	Aug 2011 – Sep 2012	Limited series	
Snow Blind		#1–4	Dec 2015 – Mar 2016	Limited series	
Soldier Zero		#1–12	Oct 2010 – Sep 2011	Limited series	
Sombra		#1–4	Jul 2016 – Oct 2016	Limited series	
Something Is Killing the Children		#1–30	Sept 2019 – Mar 2023	Ongoing series	
Sons of Anarchy		#1–25	Sep 2013 – Sep 2015	Ongoing series; based on the TV series.	
Sons of Anarchy	Redwood Original	#1–12	Aug 2016 – Jul 2017	Limited series; based on the TV series.	
Space Warped		#1–6	Jun 2011 – Dec 2011	Limited series	
Sparrowhawk		#1–5	Oct 2018 – Mar 2019	Limited series	
Specs		#1–4	Nov 2022 – Feb 2023	Limited series	
Specter Inspectors		#1–5	Feb 2021 – Jun 2021	Limited series	
The Spire		#1–8	Jul 2015 – Jun 2016	Limited series	
Starborn		#1–12	Dec 2010 – Nov 2011	Limited series	
Station		#1–4	Jun 2008 – Sep 2008	Limited series	
Star Trek/Planet of the Apes: The Primate Directive		#1–5	Dec 2014 – Apr 2015	Limited series; co-published with IDW Publishing.	
Steed and Mrs. Peel	vol. 1	#1–6	Jan 2012 – Jul 2012	Limited series; based on the TV series The Avengers.	
Steed and Mrs. Peel	vol. 2	#0–11	Aug 2012 – Jul 2013	Ongoing series; based on the TV series The Avengers.	
Steed and Mrs. Peel	We're Needed	#1—3	Jul 2014 – Sep 2014	Limited series; based on the TV series The Avengers.	
Steven Universe	vol. 1	#1–8	Aug 2014 – Mar 2015	Limited series; based on the TV series.	
Steven Universe	vol. 2	#1–36	Feb 2017 – Jan 2020	Ongoing series; based on the TV series.	
Steven Universe	2016 Special	#1	Dec 2016	Based on the TV series.	
Steven Universe	and the Crystal Gems	#1–4	Mar 2016 – Jun 2016	Limited series; based on the TV series.	
Steven Universe	Fusion Frenzy	#1	May 2019	One-shot; based on the TV series.	
Steven Universe	Greg Universe Special	#1	Apr 2015	One-shot; based on the TV series.	
Steven Universe	Harmony	#1–5	Aug 2018 – Dec 2018	Limited series; based on the TV series.	
The StoryTeller	Fairies	#1–4	Dec 2017 – Mar 2018	Limited series	
The StoryTeller	Ghosts	#1–4	Mar 2020 – Aug 2020	Limited series	
The StoryTeller	Giants	#1–4	Dec 2016 – Mar 2017	Limited series	
The StoryTeller	Shapeshifters	#1–4	Mar 2022 – Jun 2022	Limited series	
The StoryTeller	Sirens	#1–4	Apr 2019 – Jul 2019	Limited series	
The StoryTeller	Tricksters	#1–4	Mar 2021 – Jun 2021	Limited series	
The StoryTeller	Witches	#1–4	Sep 2014 – Dec 2014	Limited series	
Strange Attractors		#1–5	Jun 2016 – Oct 2016	Limited series	
Strange Fruit		#1–5	Jul 2015 – Nov 2016	Limited series	
Strange Skies Over East Berlin		#1–4	Oct 2019 – Jan 2020	Limited series	
Stuff of Nightmares		#1–4	Sep 2022 – Dec 2022	Limited series	
Suicide Risk		#1–25	May 2013 – May 2015	Limited series	
Supurbia		#1–4	Mar 2012 – Jun 2012	Limited series	
Swordsmith Assassin		#1–4	Aug 2009 – Nov 2009	Limited series	

== T ==
Title	Series	Issues	Dates	Notes	Reference
Tag		#1–3	Jun 2006 – Jan 2007	Limited series	
Tag	Cursed	#1–5	Mar 2007 – Jul 2007	Limited series; sequel story.	
Talent		#1–4	May 2006 – Oct 2006	Limited series	
Tarzan on the Planet of the Apes		#1–5	Sep 2016 – Jan 2017	Limited series; co-published with Dark Horse Comics.	
Teen Dog		#1–8	Sep 2014 – Apr 2015	Limited series; published under the Boom! Box imprint.	
Thomas Alsop		#1–8	Jun 2014 – Jan 2015	Limited series	
The Thriling Adventure Hour		#1–4	Jul 2018 – Oct 2018	Limited series	
Toil and Trouble		#1–6	Sep 2015 – Feb 2016	Limited series; published under the Archaia Entertainment imprint.	
Toy Story		#0–7	Nov 2009 – Sep 2010	Limited series; based on the Disney/Pixar film series.	
Toy Story	Some Assembly Required	nn	Oct 2010	One-shot	
Toy Story	Tales from the Toy Chest	#1–4	Jul 2010 – Oct 2010	Limited series	
Toy Story	The Mysterious Stranger	#1–4	May 2009 – Jul 2009	Limited series	
Translucid		#1–6	Apr 2014 – Sep 2014	Limited series	
The Traveler		#1–12	Nov 2010 – Oct 2011	Limited series; based on the character conceived by Stan Lee.	
Turncoat		#1–4	Mar 2016 – Jun 2016	Limited series	

== U ==
Title	Series	Issues	Dates	Notes	Reference
UFOlogy		#1–6	Apr 2015 – Nov 2015	Limited series	
Uncle Grandpa		#1–4	Oct 2014 – Jan 2015	Limited series; based on TV series	
Uncle Grandpa	and the Time Casserole	nn	Mar 2016	Graphic novel	
Uncle Grandpa	Good Morning Special	#1	Apr 2016		
Uncle Grandpa	Pizza Steve Special	#1	Jun 2016		
Uncle $crooge		#384–404	Oct 2009 – Jun 2011	Ongoing series; previously published by Dell, Gold Key, Disney, Gladstone and Gemstone and resumed from #383.	
Undertaker: Rise of the Deadman		nn	Oct 2018	Graphic novel	
An Unkindness of Ravens		#1–5	Sep 2020 – Jan 2021	Limited series	
The Unknown		#1–4	May 2009 – Aug 2009	Limited series	
The Unknown	The Devil Made Flesh	#1–4	Sep 2009 – Dec 2009	Limited series; sequel story	
The Unsound		#1–6	Jun 2017 – Nov 2017	Limited series	
Unthinkable		#1–5	May 2009 – Sep 2009	Limited series	

== V ==
Title	Series	Issues	Dates	Notes	Reference
Valen the Outcast		#1–8	Dec 2011 – Jul 2012	Limited series	
The Vampire Slayer		#1–12	Apr 2022 – May 2023	Limited series; reboot story set in the Buffyverse.	
Venus		#1–4	Dec 2015 – Mar 2016	Limited series	
Victor Lavalle's Destroyer		#1–6	May 2017 – Oct 2017	Limited series	

== W ==
Title	Series	Issues	Dates	Notes	Reference
WALL-E		#0–7	Nov 2009 – Jun 2010	Limited series; based on the Disney/Pixar film of the same title.	
Walt Disney's Comics and Stories		#699–720	Sep 2009 – Jun 2011	Ongoing series; previously published by Dell, Gold Key, Disney, Gladstone and Gemstone and resumed from #698.	
War for the Planet of the Apes		#1—4	Jul 2017 – Oct 2017	Limited series; movie tie-in.	
War of the Worlds: Second Wave		#1–6	Feb 2006 – Sep 2006	Limited series; based on the characters and elements from the 1898 novel The War of the Worlds by H. G. Wells.	
Warhammer	Condemned by Fire	#1–5	Apr 2008 – Sep 2008	Limited series	
Warhammer	Crown of Destruction	#1–4	Sep 2008 – Dec 2008	Limited series	
Warhammer	Forge of War	#1–5	Jun 2007 – Jan 2008	Limited series	
Warhammer 40,000		#0	Aug 2007	One-shot	
Warhammer 40,000	Blood and Thunder	#1–5	Oct 2007 – Feb 2008	Limited series	
Warhammer 40,000	Damnation Crusade	#1–6	Dec 2006 – Jul 2007	Limited series	
Warhammer 40,000	Defenders of Ultramar	#1–4	Nov 2008 – Feb 2009	Limited series	
Warhammer 40,000	Exterminatus	#1—5	Jun 2008 – Nov 2008	Limited series	
Warhammer 40,000	Fire & Honour	#1—4	Aug 2008 – Nov 2008	Limited series	
Warhammer 40,000	Mettle	nn	Nov 2006	One-shot	
Warhammer Online: Prelude to War		nn	May 2009	One-shot; Free Comic Book Day 2009 issue.	
Warlords of Appalachia		#1—4	Oct 2016 – Jan 2017	Limited series	
We Only Find Them When They're Dead		#1—15	Sep 2020 – Dec 2022	Limited series	
Weavers		#1—6	May 2016 – Oct 2016	Limited series	
Welcome Back		#1—8	Aug 2015 – May 2016	Limited series	
Welcome to Wanderland		#1—4	Sep 2018 – May 2019	Limited series, published under the Boom! Box imprint.	
Wet Hot American Summer		nn	Nov 2018	Graphic novel; based on the 2001 film of the same title.	
What Were They Thinking?!	Go West Young Man	#1	Mar 2007		
What Were They Thinking?!	Journal My War: The Dyslexic Diaries	#1	2005		
What Were They Thinking?!	Some People Never Learn	#1	Mar 2006		
Whisper		#1	Nov 2006		
Wicked Things		#1—6	Mar 2020 – Oct 2020	Limited series, published under the Boom! Box imprint.	
Wild's End		#1–6	Sep 2014 – Feb 2015	Limited series	
Wild's End	The Enemy Within	#1–6	Sep 2015 – Feb 2016	Limited series; sequel story.	
Wizard Beach		#1–5	Dec 2018 – Apr 2019	Limited series	
Wizards of Mickey		#1–8	Jan 2010 – Aug 2010	Limited series	
The Woods		#1–36	May 2014 – Oct 2017	Ongoing series	
The World of Cars	The Rookie	#1–4	Mar 2009 – Sep 2009	Limited series	
The World of Cars	Radiator Springs	#1–4	Jul 2009 – Oct 2009	Limited series	
WWE		#1–25	Jan 2017 – Feb 2019	Ongoing series; based on the WWE Championship overall.	
WWE	Attitude 2018 Special	#1	Aug 2018	One-shot	
WWE	Forever	#1	Jan 2019	One-shot	
WWE	Royal Rumble 2018 Special	#1	Jan 2018	One-shot	
WWE	Smackdown 20th Anniversary	#1	Oct 2019	One-shot	
WWE	Summer Slam 2017 Special	#1	Augu 2017	One-shot	
WWE	Survivors Series 2017 Special	#1	Nov 2017	One-shot	
WWE	The New Day: Power of Positivity	#1–2	Jul 2021 – Aug 2021	Limited series	
WWE	Then. Now. Forever.	#1	Nov 2016	One-shot	
WWE: NXT Takeover	Into the Fire	#1	Sep 2018	One-shot	
WWE: NXT Takeover	Proving Ground	#1	Sep 2018	One-shot	
WWE: NXT Takeover	Redemption	#1	Sep 2018	One-shot	
WWE: NXT Takeover	The Blueprint	#1	Sep 2018	One-shot	
WWE: Wrestlemania	2017 Special	#1	Mar 2017	One-shot	
WWE: Wrestlemania	2018 Special	#1	Apr 2018	One-shot	
WWE: Wrestlemania	2019 Special	#1	Mar 2019	One-shot	
Wynd		#1—10	Jun 2020 – Sep 2021	Limited series	
Wynd	The Throne in the Sky	#1—5	Aug 2022 – Dec 2022	Limited series; sequel story.	

== X ==
Title	Series	Issues	Dates	Notes	Reference
X Isle		#1–5	Jun 2006 – May 2007	Limited series	

== Z ==
Title	Series	Issues	Dates	Notes	Reference
Zombie Tales	2061	#1	Jul 2009	One-shot	
Zombie Tales	Death Valley	#1–2	Dec 2005 – Feb 2006	Limited series	
Zombie Tales	Oblivion	#1	Oct 2005	One-shot	
Zombie Tales	The Dead	#1	Mar 2006	One-shot	
Zombie Tales	The Series	#1–12	Apr 2008 – Mar 2009	Ongoing series	
Zombie Tales	The War at Home	#1	Sep 2008	One-shot	
