= Beneath the Dark Crystal =

- Cover of Jim Henson's Beneath the Dark Crystal: The Complete Collection

Publication information
- Publisher: Boom Studios
- Format: Limited series
- Genre: Fantasy
- Publication date: July 2018 – August 2019
- No. of issues: 12

Creative team
- Written by: Adam Smith
- Artist(s): Alexandria Huntington, Variant Covers by David Petersen
- Letterer: Jim Campbell
- Editor: Cameron Chittock

Beneath the Dark Crystal is a 2018 comic book limited series that is a sequel to the 2017 series The Power of the Dark Crystal.

== Conception ==
It continues Thurma and Kensho's story that began in the series The Power of the Dark Crystal.

== Plot ==
Kensho arrives at the Crystal Castle where he once was an acolyte and has been asked to become Thra's leader. However, he feels that before accepting the position, he must face the mistakes of the past. Meanwhile, the realm of Mithra that is below Thra is being reconstructed by the newly crowned Ember Queen Thurma, whose rule is challenged when evidence is discovered that another Fireling has a competing claim to the throne.

== Reception ==
The comic received a mostly positive reception from critics, with an 8.4/10 average review.
