= Firefly (Boom! Studios comics) =

Comic book series, canonical continuation of the Firefly TV series

Firefly was an ongoing line of comic books published by Boom! Studios from 2018, set in the universe of the Firefly media Franchise. Written by Greg Pak and illustrated by Dan McDaid, this series submerges into the themes of family, loyalty, identity, and redemption focusing on the early experiences of Malcolm Reynolds during the war that shaped his future as captain of the Serenity. It is a canonical continuation of Joss Whedon's Firefly television series, the 2005 film Serenity, and Dark Horse Comics' Serenity comics, which are all part of the Firefly media franchise.

In mid-2018, Entertainment Weekly announced that Boom! Studios had assumed the Firefly license from Dark Horse Comics. Joss Whedon, creator of the original television series, will act as story consultant. Boom! Studios has also reprinted the Dark Horse stories in omnibus volumes.

Boom! Studios did not renew their license for Firefly in 2025. They cancelled the series Firefly: Zoë Alleyne Year One, which was previously announced for release in 2025.

== Issues ==
=== Firefly ===
Issue	Release date	Story	Art	Colors	Cover
Firefly #1	November 14, 2018	Greg Pak	Dan McDaid	Marcelo Costa	Lee Garbett; J.G. Jones (variant); Joe Quinones (variant); Bill Sienkiewicz (variant)
Firefly #2	December 19, 2018	Greg Pak	Dan McDaid	Marcelo Costa	Lee Garbett; Diego Galindo (variant); Joe Quinones (variant); Marguerite Sauvage (variant)
Firefly #3	January 16, 2019	Greg Pak	Dan McDaid	Marcelo Costa	Lee Garbett; Joe Quinones (variants); Marguerite Sauvage (variants)
Firefly #4	February 20, 2019	Greg Pak	Dan McDaid	Marcelo Costa	Lee Garbett; Joe Quinones (variants); Marguerite Sauvage (variants)
Firefly #5	April 24, 2019	Greg Pak	Dan McDaid	Marcelo Costa	Lee Garbett; Joe Quinones (variant); W.Scott Forbes (variant); David Rubin (variant)
Firefly #6	May 15, 2019	Greg Pak	Dan McDaid	Marcelo Costa	Lee Garbett; Joe Quinones (variant); Ethan Young (variant); Will Sliney (variant); Diego Galindo (variant)
Firefly #7	June 19, 2019	Greg Pak	Dan McDaid	Marcelo Costa	Lee Garbett; Will Sliney (variant); Amelia Vidal (variant)
Firefly #8	July 17, 2019	Greg Pak	Dan McDaid	Marcelo Costa	Lee Garbett; Juan Doe (variant); Amelia Vidal (variant)
Firefly #9	September 18, 2019	Greg Pak	Dan McDaid	Marcelo Costa	Lee Garbett; Aaron Dana (variant)
Firefly #10	October 16, 2019	Greg Pak	Dan McDaid	Marcelo Costa	Lee Garbett; Will Sliney (variant); Rahzzah (variant)
Firefly #11	November 20, 2019	Greg Pak	Dan McDaid	Marcelo Costa	Lee Garbett; Will Sliney (variant); Juan Doe (variant)
Firefly #12	December 18, 2019	Greg Pak	Dan McDaid	Marcelo Costa	Lee Garbett; Joe Quinones (variant); Ethan Young (variant); Rahzzah (variant)
Firefly #13	January 22, 2020	Greg Pak	Lalit Kumar Sharma	Francesco Segala	Marc Aspinall; Ben Caldwell (variant); Daniel Warren Johnson with Mike Spicer(variant); Dan McDaid (variant)
Firefly #14	February 19, 2020	Greg Pak	Lalit Kumar Sharma	Francesco Segala	Marc Aspinall; George Kambadais with Joana Lafuente (variant); Daniel Warren Johnson with Mike Spicer(variant); Dan McDaid (variant)
Firefly #15	March 18, 2020	Greg Pak	Lalit Kumar Sharma	Francesco Segala	Marc Aspinall; George Kambadais with Joana Lafuente (variant); Daniel Warren Johnson with Mike Spicer(variant); Dan McDaid (variant)
Firefly #16	June 17, 2020	Greg Pak	Ramon Bachs	Joana Lafuente	Marc Aspinall; George Kambadais with Joana Lafuente (variant); Daniel Warren Johnson with Mike Spicer(variant)
Firefly #17	July 8, 2020	Greg Pak	Lalit Kumar Sharma		Marc Aspinall; Kano (variant)
Firefly #18	July 29, 2020	Greg Pak	Lalit Kumar Sharma		Marc Aspinall; George Kambadais (variant); Ingo Romling (variant)
Firefly #19	Aug 19, 2020	Greg Pak	Lalit Kumar Sharma		Marc Aspinall; George Kambadais (variant); Jorge Corona (variant)
Firefly #20	September 16, 2020	Greg Pak	Daniel Bayliss		Marc Aspinall; George Kambadais (variant)
Firefly #21	October 21, 2020	Greg Pak	Lalit Kumar Sharma, Daniel Bayliss		Marc Aspinall; George Kambadais (variant); Ben Harvey (variant)
Firefly #22	November 18, 2020	Greg Pak	Lalit Kumar Sharma, Daniel Bayliss		Marc Aspinall
Firefly #23	December 9, 2020	Greg Pak	Lalit Kumar Sharma, Daniel Bayliss		Marc Aspinall
Firefly #24	December 16, 2020	Greg Pak	Lalit Kumar Sharma, Daniel Bayliss		Marc Aspinall
Firefly #25	January 27, 2021	Greg Pak	Pius Bak	Bengal	Bengal
Firefly #26	February 24, 2021	Greg Pak	Pius Bak	Bengal	Bengal
Firefly #27	March 31, 2021	Greg Pak	Ethan Young	Bengal	Bengal
Firefly #28	April 28, 2021	Greg Pak	Ethan Young	Bengal	Bengal
Firefly #29	May 26, 2021	Greg Pak	Guillermo Sanna	Bengal	Bengal; Gabriel Hernandez Walta; Bengal; Gabriel Hernandez Walta
Firefly #30	June 23, 2021	Greg Pak	Guillermo Sanna	Bengal	Bengal; W. Scott Forbes; Bengal; W. Scott Forbes
Firefly #31	July 28, 2021	Greg Pak	Simona Di Gianfelice	Bengal	Bengal; Yanick Paquette; Bengal; Yanick Paquette
Firefly #32	August 25, 2021	Greg Pak	Jahnoy Lindsay		Bengal; Jakub Rebelka
Firefly #33	October 27, 2021	Greg Pak	Simona Gianfelice	Francesco Segala	Bengal; Giuseppe Camuncoli
Firefly #34	December 01, 2021	Greg Pak	Simona Gianfelice	Francesco Segala	Bengal; Kai Carpenter; Christian Ward
Firefly #35	December 29, 2021	Greg Pak	Simona Gianfelice	Francesco Segala	Bengal; Kai Carpenter; Junggeun Yoon
Firefly #36	January 26, 2022	Greg Pak	Simona Gianfelice	Francesco Segala	Bengal; Kai Carpenter; Stephanie Pepper

=== Firefly: Brand New ‘Verse ===
Issue	Release date	Story	Art	Colors	Cover
Firefly: Brand New ‘Verse #1	March 24, 2021	Josh Lee Gordon	Fabiana Mascolo	Lucia DiGiamarino	Qistina Khalidah
Firefly: Brand New ‘Verse #2	April 21, 2021	Josh Lee Gordon	Fabiana Mascolo	Lucia DiGiamarino	Qistina Khalidah
Firefly: Brand New ‘Verse #3	May 12, 2021	Josh Lee Gordon	Fabiana Mascolo	Lucia DiGiamarino	Qistina Khalidah; Veronica Fish; Dani; Dani Virgin; Qistina Khalidah Virgin; Veronica Fish Virgin
Firefly: Brand New ‘Verse #4	June 16, 2021	Josh Lee Gordon	Fabiana Mascolo	Lucia DiGiamarino	Qistina Khalidah; Veronica Fish; Khary Randolph; Khary Randolph
Firefly: Brand New ‘Verse #5	July 21, 2021	Josh Lee Gordon	Fabiana Mascolo	Lucia DiGiamarino	Qistina Khalidah; Veronica Fish; Tula Lotay; Tula Lotay
Firefly: Brand New ‘Verse #6	August 18, 2021	Josh Lee Gordon	Fabiana Mascolo	Lucia DiGiamarino	Qistina Khalidah; Veronica Fish

=== All New Firefly ===
Issue	Release date	Story	Art	Colors	Cover
All New Firefly #1	February 16, 2022	David Booher	Jordi Perez	Francesco Segala	Mona Finden
All New Firefly #2	March 23, 2022	David Booher	Jordi Perez	Francesco Segala	Mona Finden
All New Firefly #3	April 27, 2022	David Booher	Jordi Perez	Francesco Segala	Mona Finden
All New Firefly #4	May 25, 2022	David Booher	Jordi Perez	Francesco Segala	Mona Finden
All New Firefly #5	June 22, 2022	David Booher	Vincenzo Federici	Matt Herms	Mona Finden
All New Firefly #6	July 27, 2022	David Booher	Vincenzo Federici	Matt Herms	Mona Finden
All New Firefly #7	August 24, 2022	David Booher	Vincenzo Federici	Matt Herms	Mona Finden
All New Firefly #8	September 21, 2022	David Booher	Vincenzo Federici	Matt Herms	Mona Finden
All New Firefly #9	October 19, 2022	David Booher	Simona Di Gianfelice	Francesco Segala	Mona Finden
All New Firefly #10	November 16, 2022	David Booher	Simona Di Gianfelice	Francesco Segala	Mona Finden
All New Firefly: Big Damn Finale #1	December 21, 2022	David Booher	Simona Di Gianfelice	Francesco Segala	Mona Finden

=== Firefly: The Fall Guys ===
Issue	Release date	Story	Art	Colors	Cover
Firefly: The Fall Guys #1	September 14, 2023	Sam Humphries	Jorge Pérez	Francesco Segala	Francesco Francanvilla
Firefly: The Fall Guys #2	October 12, 2023	Sam Humphries	Jorge Pérez	Francesco Segala	Francesco Francanvilla
Firefly: The Fall Guys #3	November 8, 2023	Sam Humphries	Jorge Pérez	Francesco Segala	Francesco Francanvilla
Firefly: The Fall Guys #4	January 11, 2024	Sam Humphries	Jorge Pérez	Francesco Segala	Francesco Francanvilla
Firefly: The Fall Guys #5	February 14, 2024	Sam Humphries	Jorge Pérez	Francesco Segala	Francesco Francanvilla
Firefly: The Fall Guys #6	March 13, 2024	Sam Humphries	Jorge Pérez	Francesco Segala	Francesco Francanvilla

=== One-shots ===
Issue	Release date	Story	Art	Colors	Cover
Firefly: Bad Company #1	March 20, 2019	Josh Lee Gordon	Francesco Mortarino	Giuseppe Cafaro	Diego Galindo; Jamal Campbell (variant)
Free Comic Book Day 2019 Buffy/Firefly	May 4, 2019	Greg Pak	Ethan Young	Wesllei Manoel	Greg Smallwood
Firefly: The Outlaw Ma Reynolds #1	January 8, 2020	Greg Pak	Davide Gianfelice; George Kambadais	Joana Lafuente	Ethan Young; Ming Doyle (variant); Michael Walsh (variant)
Firefly: Blue Sun Rising #0	September 30, 2020	Greg Pak	Dan McDaid		Nimit Malavia; Christian Ward (variant); Caitlin Yarsky (variant)
Firefly: Blue Sun Rising #1	December 23, 2020	Greg Pak	Dan McDaid		Nimit Malavia; Christian Ward (variant); Lorenzo De Felici (variant)
Firefly: River Run #1	September, 2021	David Booher	Andres Genolet	Mattia Iacono	Christian Ward Adam Gorham (variant)
The Firefly Holiday Special #1	December 15, 2021	Jeff Jensen	Jordi Perez; Vincenzo Federici; Fabiana Mascola	Francesco Sengala; Lucia Di Giamarino; Fabiana Mascola	InHyuk Lee; Caitlin Yarsky; Daniel Warren Johnson
Firefly: 20th Anniversary Special	August 24, 2022	Jorge Corona; Josh Lee Gordon	Jordi Perez; Nicola Izzo	Francesco Segala; Lucia Di Giammarino	Marc Aspinall
Firefly: Keep Flying #1	November 9, 2022	Jeff Jensen	Nicola Izzo	Francesco Segala	Frany
Firefly: Malcolm Reynolds Year One #1	September 4, 2024	Sam Humphries	Giovanni Fabiano	Gloria Martinelli	Ejikure

== Graphic novels ==
Title	Release date	Story	Art	Colors	Letters	Cover	ISBN
Firefly: The Sting (HC)	November 19, 2019	Delilah S. Dawson	Richard Ortiz; Serg Acuña; Pius Bak; Hyeonjin Kim; Rodrigo Lorenzo	Joana Lafuente; Doug Garbark; Natalia Marques	Jim Campbell	Marco D'Alfonso, Miguel Mercado (Ltd.Ed.)	9781684154333
Firefly: Watch How I Soar (HC)	November 25, 2020	Jeff Jensen; Ethan Young; Jared Cullum; Jorge Corona; Giannis Milonogiannis	Jorge Monlogo; Ethan Young; Jared Cullum; Fabiana Mascolo; Giannis Milonogiannis; Jordi Pérez	Fabiana Mascolo; Giada Marchisio; Maxflan Aurajo	Fábio Amelia	Miguel Mercado	9781684156559

== Collections ==
Title	Release date	Collects	ISBN
Firefly; Legacy Edition: Book One (TPB)	November 7, 2018	Serenity: Those Left Behind; Serenity: Better Days; Serenity: The Other Half; Serenity: Downtime; Serenity: The Shepherd's Tale; Serenity: Float Out; Serenity: It's Never Easy	9781684153206
Firefly; Legacy Edition: Book Two (TPB)	January 30, 2019	Serenity: Leaves on the Wind; Serenity: The Warrior and the Wind; Serenity: No Power in the 'Verse	9781684153084
Firefly; Legacy Deluxe Edition (HC)	July 1, 2020	Serenity: Those Left Behind; Serenity: Better Days; Serenity: The Other Half; Serenity: Downtime; Serenity: The Shepherd's Tale; Serenity: Float Out; Serenity: It's Never Easy; Serenity: Leaves on the Wind; Serenity: The Warrior and the Wind; Serenity: No Power in the 'Verse	9781684155392
Firefly: The Unification War Vol. 1 (HC)	April 17, 2019	Firefly #1–4; Bad Company #1 (Barnes & Noble edition only)	9781684153220; 9781684154159 (B&N)
Firefly: The Unification War Vol. 2 (HC)	December 11, 2019	Firefly #5–8; Free Comic Book Day 2019	9781684154340
Firefly: The Unification War Vol. 3 (HC)	May 4, 2020	Firefly #9–12	9781684155002
Firefly: The Unification War; Deluxe Edition (HC)	October 28, 2020	Firefly #1–12; Boss Moon: Birth of a Unificator (Free Comic Book Day 2019); Bad Company #1; The Ballad of Chang-Benitez (Exclusive Short Story)	9781684156023
Firefly: New Sheriff in the 'Verse Vol. 1 (HC)	September 15, 2020	The Outlaw Ma Reynolds #1; Firefly #13–15	9781684156009
Firefly: New Sheriff in the 'Verse Vol. 2 (HC)	January 19, 2021	Firefly #16–20	9781684156603
Firefly: Blue Sun Rising Vol. 1 (HC)	March 30, 2021	Firefly: Blue Sun Rising #0; Firefly #21–22	9781684156597
Firefly: Blue Sun Rising Vol. 2 (HC)	May 18, 2021	Firefly #23–24; Firefly: Blue Sun Rising #1	9781684156931
Firefly: Blue Sun Rising Deluxe Edition (HC)	November 30, 2021	The Outlaw Ma Reynolds #1; Firefly #13–24; Firefly: Blue Sun Rising #0–1; Queen of the Night (Exclusive Short Story)	9781684157419
Firefly: Return to Earth That Was Vol. 1 (HC)	September 22, 2021	Firefly #25–28	9781684156962
Firefly: Return to Earth That Was Vol. 2 (HC)	January 25, 2022	Firefly #29–32	9781684158065
Firefly: Return to Earth That Was Vol. 3 (HC)	June 14, 2022	Firefly #33–36	9781684158355
Firefly: Return to Earth That Was Deluxe Edition (HC)	January 5, 2023	Firefly #25–36; Firefly: River Run #1; The Firefly Holiday Special #1; The Appointment (Exclusive Short Story)	9781684158690
Firefly: Brand New 'Verse (HC)	February 15, 2022	Firefly: Brand New 'Verse #1–6	9781684158096
All-New Firefly: The Gospel According to Jayne Vol. 1 (HC)	October 25, 2022	All-New Firefly #1–4	9781684158485
All-New Firefly: The Gospel According to Jayne Vol. 2 (HC)	October 3, 2023	All-New Firefly #5–8	9781608861422
All-New Firefly: The Gospel According to Jayne Vol. 3 (HC)	November 23, 2023	All-New Firefly #9–10; All-New Firefly Big Damn Finale #1	9781608861446
Firefly: The Fall Guys (HC)	October 10, 2024	Firefly: The Fall Guys #1-6	9781608862481

== See also ==
- List of comics based on television programs
- List of comics based on films
