= Suicide Risk =

- Issue one cover

Publication information
- Publisher: Boom! Studios
- Genre: Superheroes, science-fiction
- Publication date: March 2013 – March 2015
- No. of issues: 25

Creative team
- Written by: Mike Carey
- Artist(s): Elena Casagrande with Jorge Coehlo and Haemi Jang

Suicide Risk was an ongoing comic book series that ran for 25 issues from 2013 until 2015. It was written by Mike Carey and drawn by Elena Casagrande.

== Synopsis ==
Leo Winters is a police officer in San Diego when people with superpowers suddenly start appearing all over the world, leading to a wave of destruction and carnage. He manages to track down a grifter couple who are in possession of a device that helps people "unlock" their superpowers for a sizeable fee. They use the device on him, and he soon finds that he has not only developed superpowers, but a suppressed identity, the extra-dimensional warlord Requiem, has taken over his body.

Leo/Requiem will soon be forced to play a part in a huge conflict across dimensional barriers, threatening to destroy not only himself and his family, but the entire world and possibly the universe.

== Release history ==
- Issue #1-25 (March 2013 - March 2015)
- Collected in Trade Paperbacks:
  - Volume 1 (collects #1–4, tpb, 128 pages, 2013, ISBN 1608863328)
  - Volume 2 (collects #5-9, tpb, 128 pages, 2014, ISBN 1608863603)
  - Volume 3 (collects #10-13, tpb, 128 pages, 2014, ISBN 1608863999)
  - Volume 4 (collects #14-17, tpb, 128 pages, 2015, ISBN 1608864618)
  - Volume 5 (collects #18-21, tpb, 128 pages, 2015, ISBN 1608867218)
  - Volume 6 (collects #22-25, tpb, 160 pages, 2016, ISBN 1608868141)

== Reception ==
Critical reception for the series has been positive and the series has an average Critic rating of 8.1 on Comic Book Roundup, based on 45 reviews.
