= The Power of the Dark Crystal =

Comic Book

- Cover of Jim Henson's Power Of The Dark Crystal: The Complete Collection

Publication information
- Publisher: Boom Studios
- Format: Limited series
- Genre: Fantasy
- Publication date: 2017—2018
- No. of issues: 12

Creative team
- Written by: Annette Duffy (screenplay); David Odell (screenplay); Simon Spurrier
- Artist(s): Kelly and Nichole Matthews
- Letterer: Jim Campbell
- Editor: Sierra Hahn

The Power of the Dark Crystal is a 2017 comic book limited series that is a sequel to 1982 film The Dark Crystal. This series has a sequel, Beneath the Dark Crystal.

== Conception ==
For decades, a sequel for the 1982 film The Dark Crystal had been planned as a motion picture, but ended up being adapted into a comic instead.

The unproduced screenplay was by David Odell, Annette Odell and Craig Pearce.

== Plot ==
It is set years after the events of the 1982 film, where the Dark Crystal was healed and peace was restored on Thra. The world is faced with needing to reignite a dying sun at the center of the planet. The story of Power of the Dark Crystal follows the adventures of a young Fireling named Thurma, together with Kensho, a Gelfling outcast, that steal a shard of the Crystal of Truth in an attempt to reignite the dying sun.

== Reception ==
The comic received a mostly positive reception from critics.
