= Wizards of Mickey =

Italian fantasy comic saga

Wizards of Mickey logo

Wizards of Mickey is an Italian fantasy comic saga that began in October 2006. It was created by The Walt Disney Company Italy.

The first series, Wizards of Mickey, was published in ten parts in Topolino #2654-2663 (Oct-Dec 2006). This was followed by another ten-part series, Wizards of Mickey II - The Dark Age, in 2007. Several shorter two-part stories were published in 2008 and 2009, along with three one-part stories labelled Wizards of Mickey: The Lost Legends. The story continued with The New World (2009), Lemuria (2011), Legacy (2013), Mondimontagne (2015), Aurora (2016), Magicraft (2017), Oberon (2018), Arena (2018), Wizards of Gamba (2019) and Destino (2019).

In the United States, the first story was released by Boom! Studios in 12 parts—four issues of Mickey Mouse and Friends #296-299 (Sept 2009-Jan 2010), and eight issues of its own title, Wizards of Mickey (Jan-Aug 2010). To date, it has also been published in more than a dozen other countries.

== Authors ==
Scenario

- Stefano Ambrosio

Artists

- Lorenzo Pastrovicchio
- Roberto Santillo
- Marco Giglione

== Characters ==
=== Protagonists ===
- Mickey Mouse: The main protagonist of the series. He comes from the humble village of Miceland, where the whole story begins. Mickey is the student of Grandalf. He came to the great tournament to get his revenge on Pete, who stole the Crystal of Rain, the Crystal of Miceland. Mickey later becomes the Supreme Sorcerer of Dolmen, who then has great abilities.
- Donald Duck: A friend of Mickey Mouse, as well as teammate. Donald has a dragon named Fafnir. He is an unfortunate magician, since every time he tries to cast a spell, it either has a strange effect or works later than the time Donald cast it.
- Goofy: Another friend of Mickey Mouse, as well as teammate. He has a magic staff, although his real magic power is in Goofy's bag, which can create items. Goofy is destined to be a great magician, although he does not want to be one- and doesn't want to rely on magic to solve his problems, instead using more practical, normal methods. He wants to find another job, but seemingly can't find one.
- Nereus: Mickey's master. He gives Mickey the job to protect the Diamagic after leaving to go to the Great Library, only to be imprisoned by the Phantom Blot and his team. He communicates with Mickey using his pendant-o-phone while being imprisoned. Nereus was once a student of the Supreme Sorcerer, along with the Phantom Blot. He's the only protagonist that is a human, somewhat an oddity in the Mickey Mouse universe.
- Venerable Ormen: King of the Good Dragons, he is the wisest of all the dragons and the guardian of the dragons' wisdom. Of all the dragons, Ormen is the oldest. He has helped Mickey Mouse, Donald Duck and Goofy many times. He has great magical powers, but he is very old so he prefers to spend his time resting. Ormen has the power of telepathy and can use them to contact Mickey's team in case he needs help.
- Zefren: A member of team Magma Dragon Fire. His scales are of a red color. Mickey's team first faced him, and team Magma Dragon Fire, in a battle.
- Zoron: Brother of Zefren, and member of team Magma Dragon Fire. His scales are of a yellow color.
- Zaius: Another brother of Zefren, and member of team Magma Dragon Fire. His scales have a blue color.
- Fafnir: Pet dragon of Donald. He is a baby dragon that is tender but sometimes fierce. Fafnir's personal way of saying thanks is to blow a huge stream of fire. The victim of his fire is almost always Donald, as he is the one who found Fafnir stuck in a trap. From that time, he never separated from Donald.
- Pluto: Mickey's pet dog. Because of a potion he can transform into a monster dog and back to his normal form whenever Mickey says so, or whether Pluto wants to.
- Minnie Mouse: Princess of a kingdom in Dolmen. Her people have been turned to stone, so she set off to find a Crystal to restore the kingdom. Also member of team Diamond Moon.
- Clarabelle Cow: A friend of Minnie. She can tell the future through a crystal ball, although when she tells it to Minnie and Daisy, it is the past, since the future in the crystal ball had already happened. Clarabelle rarely uses her magic though.
- Daisy Duck: Another friend of Minnie, as well as member of team Diamond Moon. Her pet is the white cat Kiki, who constantly gets in a fight with Fafnir.

=== Antagonists ===
- Phantom Blot: The master of all evil, he gives orders to Team Black Phantom. Phantom Blot does not wear disguise, unlike other Mickey Mouse comic strips. He has a dragon called Roknar. Blot imprisons Mickey's master in his prison where his giant castle lays.
- Team Black Phantom: A team that has 4 members, although the amount that is allowed is 3, not 4, so one member has to wear an invisibility cloak. The team consists of Pete and the Beagle Boys, and Phantom Blot who gives them orders. One of the Beagle Boys wears the invisibility cloak, which he has not only to disguise himself from the other teams, but to use it for evil uses too.
- Roknar: Phantom Blot's dragon. His scales are of a dark red color. Roknar can sometimes get scared of Phantom Blot, and sometimes even "plays" with Blot's army when he is not allowed to.
- Magica De Spell: Magica is an evil sorceress, part of team Jinx. She has her raven, Ratface, with her, as in most of the comics in which she appears. In the Wizards of Mickey continuity, Magica used to learn at the school Garma taught at.
- Neraja: Another member of Team Jinx. She used to teach at a school when she was a child due to her intelligence.
- Garma: Self-proclaimed head of Team Jinx. She is in bitter rivalry with Neraja and Magica, due to choosing to be head of Team Sventura when Neraja and Magica didn't agree with the fact.
- Dark Mickey/Black Socerer: Mickey himself fell under the influence of Phantom Blot who transformed him in the Black Sorcerer. After Mickey gets freed, Phantom Blot takes his DNA for clones him and creates Dark Mickey who rebels against him and decides to go on his own.

== Spells ==
There are many spells used throughout the saga. Here is just a small list of them.

- Rainstorm: Firstly used by Mickey at the beginning of Book 1. Used also by Pete to extinguish a fire in the Great Tournament.
- Spiral Thunder: Used by team Diamond Moon. It creates a double lightning storm that goes in spirals and points towards the enemy. However, there is a gap in the middle of it, as taught to Mickey by Zefren, which can be used to hit the person using it before the spell hits its target.
- Jail Stones: Summons a small rain of jail stones to fall down. Used by Mickey in a battle against Team Magma Dragon Fire.
- Dematerialisation: Used by a team to go through a hedge during a qualifying match against Team Wizards of Mickey.
- Curse of forever-lasting smell: Mickey threatened to use it against Team Black Phantom if they didn't get away from him, his team and Team Magma Dragon Fire.
- Magical lightning bolt: Mickey attempted to use it in a battle against Team Diamond Moon, but failed, due to wanting to give the Crystal of Stone to Minnie.
- Transportation Spell: Used by Phantom Blot to get the staves of all of the competitors.
- Blinding Flash: Used by Mickey in a battle.

== Items ==
Many items are used in the tournament, not just by Mickey. Here are some of them.

- Staves: Used by everyone in the tournament.
- Magic Bag: Used only by Goofy to spawn many items, including books and jars.
- Crystals: The items that the competitors are battling for. They have many varieties, including: Crystal of Stone, Crystal of Sweets, Crystal of Water etc.
- Supreme Sorcerer's crown: The very crown worn by the Supreme Sorcerer. It contains all of the crystals in the Wizards of Mickey universe, as they were the pieces of the broken crown.

== Original publication history ==
- Wizards of Mickey - Le origini (English: The Origins), first published in Topolino issues #2654-2663 (Oct-Dec 2006)
- Wizards of Mickey II - L'Età Oscura (English: The Dark Age), Topolino #2680-2689 (April–June 2007)
- Wizards of Mickey III - Il Male Antico (English: The Ancient Evil), Topolino #2725-2726 (Feb 2008), 2739-2740 (May–June 2008), 2773-2774 (Jan 2009)
- Le Leggende Perdute (English: The Lost Legends) - Il drago lucente, Topolino #2796 (June 2009)
- Il Nuovo Mondo (English: The New World), Topolino #2802-2805 (Aug-Sept 2009)
- Le Leggende Perdute (English: The Lost Legends) - Il castello dell'oblio, Topolino #2809 (Sept 2009)
- Le Leggende Perdute (English: The Lost Legends) - La trama dei tre, Topolino #2810 (Oct 2009)
- Lemuria, Topolino #2909-2911 (Aug-Sept 2011)
- Legacy, Topolino #3017-3020 (Sept-Oct 2013)
- Mondimontagne, Topolino #3124 (Oct 2015)
- Short stories, Topolino #3125-3127 (Oct-Nov 2015)
- Aurora, Topolino #3176 (Oct 2016)
- Magicraft, Topolino #3188-3191 (Jan 2017)
- Oberon, Topolino #3261 (May 2018)
- Arena, Topolino #3285 (Nov 2018)
- Wizards of Gamba, Topolino #3297-3301 (Jan-Feb 2019)
- Destino, Topolino #3302-3303 (March 2019)

Part or all of the story has, to date, also been published in Brazil, Denmark, Finland, France, Germany, Greece, Norway, Poland, Spain, Sweden, and the United States.

== Wizards of Mickey TCG ==
There are Wizards of Mickey Trading Card Games available in Italian, French, and English.

== Vídeo game ==
A mobile game based on the comic of same name was released on 2008 published by Disney Mobile Studios.
