= Boom! Studios =

American comic book and graphic novel publisher

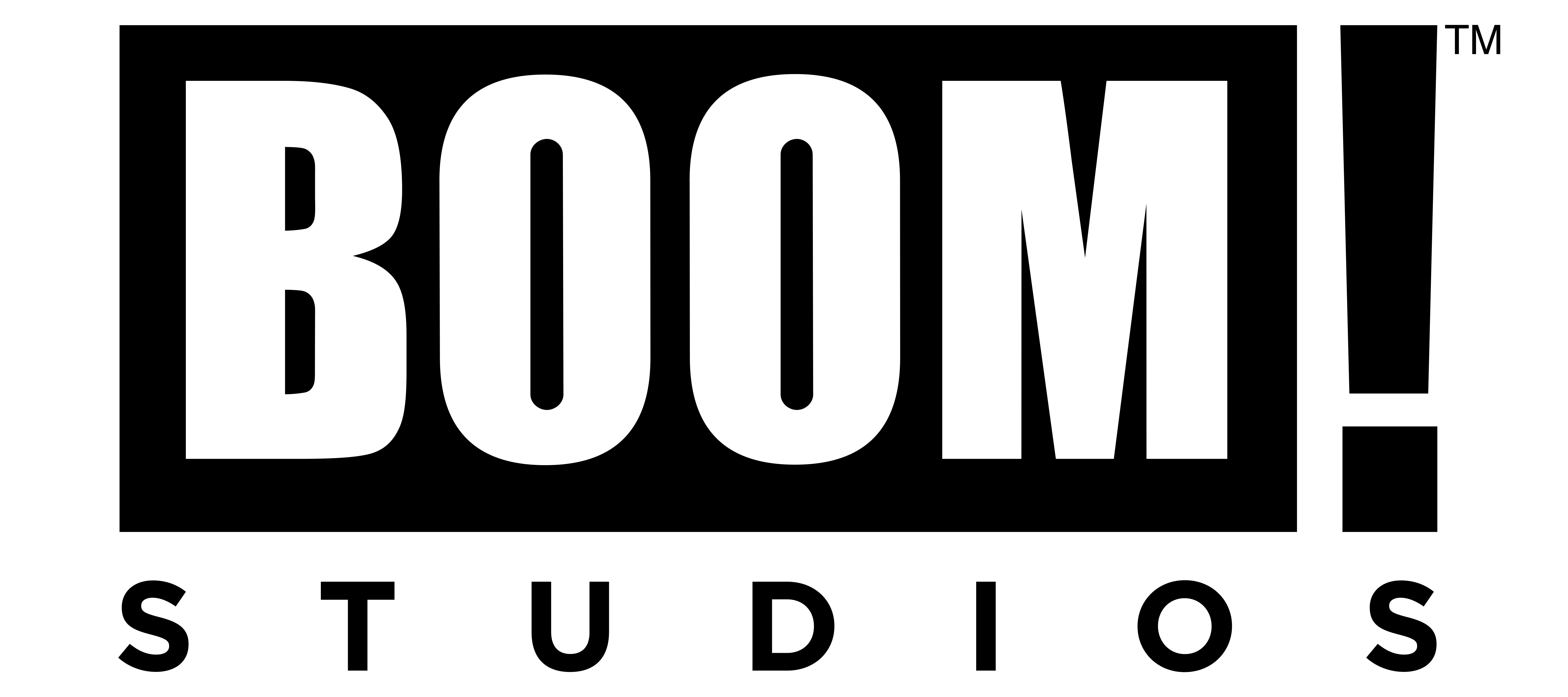
- Parent company: Random House
- Founded: June 1, 2005; 21 years ago.
- Founder: Ross Richie and Andrew Cosby
- Country of origin: United States
- Headquarters location: Los Angeles, California
- Distribution: Diamond Comic Distributors / Diamond Book Distributors (sole global for direct market and global except US, Canada and the United Kingdom for bookstores) Simon & Schuster (United States bookstores) HarperCollins Canada (Canadian bookstores) Titan Books (United Kingdom bookstores)
- Key people: Paul Levitz – Member, Board of Directors Matt Gagnon – Editor-in-Chief Filip Sablik – President of Publishing and Marketing Stephen Christy – President of Development (Film and Television) Lance Kreiter – Vice President of Licensing and Merchandising Hunter Gorinson – Vice President of Business Development
- Fiction genres: Superhero; Action; Adventure; Fantasy; Science fiction; Horror; Crime; Comedy; Mystery; Science fantasy; Dark fantasy; Thriller
- Imprints: Archaia Entertainment
- Official website: www.boom-studios.com

Boom! Studios (stylized as BOOM! Studios), is an American comic book and graphic novel publisher. They are headquartered in Los Angeles, California, United States. As of September 2024, the company is a subsidiary division of Penguin Random House.

== History ==
=== 2000s ===
Ross Richie and Andrew Cosby had been working in Hollywood with Dave Elliott and Garry Leach in 2004 to revive 1980s comic book publishing house Atomeka Press. While working with Atomeka, Richie cut a deal with Keith Giffen and J. M. DeMatteis to publish their series Hero Squared, with the Hero Squared X-Tra Sized Special one-shot.

They went on to found Boom! together in 2005. They had been helping to option comic book projects as producers, and working to develop them into films with the studios, but became increasingly frustrated with what they felt was the "tights and capes" focus of most mainstream comics companies. When Giffen was featured as a guest at the Los Angeles Comic Book and Science Fiction Convention, he persuaded Richie to start his own outfit, Boom!.

Boom!'s first publication was Zombie Tales #1, a horror zombie anthology, released under the Boom! and Atomeka Press logos on June 29, 2005. The first edition was published by Atomeka, but released after Richie had left the company to start Boom! Studios. Giffen and DeMatteis imported their Hero Squared series from Atomeka to Boom! and Hero Squared became the very first Boom! comic book sold solely under the Boom! logo. shipping July 27, 2005.

During this time in its history, Boom! focused on publishing an array of original series created by a slew of industry veterans: Giffen worked on Hero Squared, Planetary Brigade, 10, Jeremiah Harm, and the Tales titles like Zombie Tales and Cthulhu Tales. DeMatteis collaborated with Giffen on Hero Squared and Planetary Brigade and brought his own series, The Stardust Kid, with Mike Ploog, over from Image Comics. Mike Mignola and Troy Nixey's Oni Press series Jenny Finn migrated to Boom! and finally completed its story. Eisner Award winner Dave Johnson created covers for Zombie Tales and Cthulhu Tales. Joe Casey created The Black Plague while Rafael Albuquerque's first American work debuted in The Savage Brothers.

In 2006, Boom! moved into licensing for the first time with the debut of Games Workshop series Warhammer 40,000: Damnation Crusade, based on the tabletop miniature wargame. In 2007, Boom! published Steven Grant's crime/action comic 2 Guns which Cosby and Ritchie co-produced for Universal Studios in 2013.

At the 2007 San Diego Comic-Con, Boom! announced plans to launch its first imprint, a new line of comics for children originally announced with the name Zoom!, but when the imprint launched in 2009, the imprint debuted as Boom! Kids. Boom! also signed a deal with Pixar to produce comic books based on their properties and secured newsstand distribution. The first included The Muppet Show by Roger Langridge and The Incredibles: Family Matters by Mark Waid and artist Marcio Takara. In February 2011, Boom! re-branded Boom! Kids as KaBOOM!, re-focusing the imprint to be appealing to all ages rather than only children.

Also, during the 2007 San Diego Comic-Con, Boom! announced the appointment of Mark Waid as editor-in-chief. This role would eventually grow to Chief Creative Officer in August 2010 before his eventual return to freelance work in December of that year. While in these leadership roles, Waid also created multiple successful titles, including Irredeemable in 2009, which became Boom!'s longest-running series at that time, lasting 37 issues, and a sister book Incorruptible.

=== 2010s ===
Former Managing Editor Matt Gagnon was promoted to editor-in-chief in July 2010.

At the beginning of 2013, the company launched its #WeAreBoom! campaign, spotlighting a philosophy that Boom! isn't just composed of its writers, artists, and staff but also of the fans that read its comics and the retailers that sell them. In June 2013, Boom! acquired Archaia Studios Press, merging it into Boom! and retaining it as a stand-alone imprint. In October 2013, Boom! signed a first-look deal with 20th Century Fox giving Fox the right of first refusal to develop any Boom! comic properties into a film or TV series, and Boom! would get first-dollar gross on any profits. As a publisher of creator-owned works, that share would be split between Boom! and the creator(s) of the adapted work.

In January 2015, Boom! launched "Push Comics Forward", a public relations campaign aimed at generating a discussion about how comic book publishing can become more inclusive and diverse.

In June 2017, 20th Century Fox purchased a minority stake in Boom! Studios, valued at $10 million. The Walt Disney Company inherited Fox's stake in Boom! Studios after Disney acquired 21st Century Fox's assets on March 20, 2019.

=== 2020s ===
In April 2020, Boom! Studios established a first-look deal with Netflix. In July 2024, it was reported that Penguin Random House had agreed to acquire Boom! Studios from The Walt Disney Company under its Random House division. The acquisition was completed on September 17, 2024.

== Imprints ==
Boom! is composed of four main imprints: the core Boom! brand, the All-Ages focused KaBOOM!, Archaia, and Boom! Box.

=== Boom! Studios ===
The Boom! Studios imprint publishes action-oriented fare which most appropriate for teens or older readers.

==== Originals ====
Originals under the Boom! banner explore a wide variety of genres from YA science fiction, like in The Woods by James Tynion IV and Michael Dialynas, to horror/action like in the thriller Day Men, which racked up "Best Inker" and "Best Cover Artist" Harvey Awards nominations for series artist Brian Stelfreeze and sold to Universal Pictures as a movie. Crime noir period piece Hit garnered Harvey Awards nominations for "Best Continuing or Limited Series" and "Best Inker" for artist Vanesa R. Del Rey and George Pérez's series for Boom!, Sirens, is a multi-genre action piece that goes from fantasy to western to science fiction. Pulp science fiction mini-series Six Gun Gorilla, written by Si Spurrier and drawn by Jeff Stokely, was nominated for multiple Harvey Awards including "Best Artist" and "Most Promising New Talent" and "Best New Series". Boom! also published an original series from Clive Barker entitled Next Testament.

Boom! generally does not focus on superhero material but has published some titles, including Grace Randolph's Supurbia. Two of its original series, Irredeemable and Suicide Risk, have gathered accolades. Mark Waid's series Irredeemable ran for 37 issues, received several Harvey and Eisner award nominations, and spawned a sister series called Incorruptible which ran 30 issues. Mike Carey's series Suicide Risk received nominations for "Best New Series" and "Best Single Issue or Story".

In 2013, Boom! also teamed up with Say Anything singer Max Bemis to publish his first limited mini-series about a bipolar hero called Polarity. Fox optioned the right to create this story into a TV series. In 2014, they announced an ongoing series written by Bemis called Evil Empire, which ended after 12 issues.

In October 2020, Boom! published BRZRKR, a comic book series created and written by Keanu Reeves and Matt Kindt and drawn by Ron Garney. The comic follows an immortal warrior, known as Berzerker, as he fights his way through the ages.

==== Licenses ====
Boom!'s published many adaptations of popular films. Its Planet of the Apes series of comics is the longest-running adaptation of the series. Boom!'s series include: Planet of the Apes (16 issues plus an annual, a "giant" issue, a "special" issue, and a "Spectacular"), Betrayal on the Planet of the Apes (4 issues), Exile on Planet of the Apes (4 issues), and Planet of the Apes: Cataclysm (12 issues). Just before the release of Rise of the Planet of the Apes Boom! serialized a one-shot prelude to the movie online as a free webcomic. At San Diego Comic-Con in 2014, they published a one shot Dawn of the Planet of the Apes: Contagion bridging Rise of the Planet of the Apes and Dawn of the Planet of the Apes. They followed this with a six-issue limited series called Dawn of the Planet of the Apes, in the modern movie continuity. The original Planet of the Apes movie continuity crossed over with Star Trek: The Original Series in a co-publishing deal with IDW Publishing.

Other film adaptations include an ongoing series based on Big Trouble In Little China written by Eric Powell and John Carpenter, an Escape from New York comic book, an ongoing series with Bill and Ted's Excellent Adventure, an eight-issue series based on RoboCop and 28 Days Later, bridging the story between 28 Days Later and 28 Weeks Later, a 12 issue series based on Clive Barker's Nightbreed, new Hellraiser comics, eight issues of Die Hard: Year One focusing on John McClane's first year as a beat cop in New York City, and a film tie-in for Jennifer's Body.

Boom! has published a number of series that are based on television shows like Sleepy Hollow and Sons of Anarchy and Jim Henson's Fraggle Rock. New stories with Farscape began in 2009 and ran for 6 subsequent mini-series and a 24-issue ongoing series. All of Boom!'s Farscape series were co-written by show creator Rockne S. O'Bannon and take place in official show continuity immediately after the Peacekeeper Wars. Boom! also published a tie-in to SyFy's show Eureka and well as new stories featuring TV's The Avengers, also known as Steed and Mrs. Peel so as not to be confused with the Marvel Comics characters of the same name. On January 28, 2012, Boom! released a reprint of the Steed and Mrs. Peel mini-series written by Grant Morrison and drawn by Ian Gibson and previously published by Eclipse Comics. Boom! acquired the license for Mighty Morphin Power Rangers in June 2015 and released a monthly comic starting in January 2016. Soon after its launch they announced a spinoff limited series, MMPR: Pink, which launched in June 2016.

Boom! has adapted popular authors like Philip K. Dick, and Michael Moorcock: a series based on Do Androids Dream of Electric Sheep? retained all the original text to the novel and was nominated for a "Best New Series" 2010 Eisner Awards. A prequel series followed subtitled Dust to Dust. In 2011, Boom! launched Elric: The Balance Lost a new original series starring Michael Moorcock's character Elric of Melniboné and guest-starring the Eternal Champions Corum and Dorian Hawkmoon.

Boom! has licensed games as well. In 2006 they launched Games Workshop properties ultimately publishing 42 comic books collected into 9 graphic novels. 5 mini-series featured Warhammer 40,000: Damnation Crusade (Black Templars), Blood and Thunder (Orks), Exterminatus (The Inquisitors), Fire and Honour (Imperial Guardsmen), and Defenders of Ultramar (Ultramarines). Warhammer Fantasy series included Forge of War (Empire vs. Chaos), Condemned by Fire (Witch Hunters), and Crown of Destruction by Kieron Gillen depicting The Empire fighting Skaven. Boom! also produced a Blood Bowl mini entitled Killer Contract. The last Boom!/Games Workshop comics series shipped in 2009.

Boom! also publishes tie-ins with famous bands, adapting Rush's Clockwork Angels to comics. Boom! publishes The Amory Wars comic books based on the Coheed and Cambria mythology.

In July 2018, Boom! announced that they had acquired the comic book and graphic novel publishing license to Joss Whedon's Firefly with plans to release new monthly comic book series, limited series, original graphic novels and more.

In May 2020, Boom! was announced to have acquired the comic book and graphic novel rights to the 1999 prequel novel Dune: House Atreides with plans to adapt it into a 12-issue adaptation written by the original authors Brian Herbert and Kevin J. Anderson.

=== KaBOOM! ===
KaBOOM!, initially launched as Boom! Kids, publishes series that are aimed at readers of all ages.

Roger Langridge's series Snarked! ran 12 issues (3 graphic novels) from 2011 to 2012 and won an Eisner Award. New series Abigail and the Snowman was launched in December 2014.

==== Licenses ====
Boom! published a number of Pixar series featuring nearly the entire catalogue of the company's characters: The Incredibles in a 4-issue mini-series and a 16-issue ongoing, Cars in two 4-issue mini-series and an 8-issue ongoing, Toy Story in two 4-issue mini-series and an 8-issue ongoing, Wall-E with 8 issues, Finding Nemo with two 4-issue mini-series, and Monsters, Inc. in a single 4-issue mini-series.

Boom! published several series featuring The Muppets with two different editorial approaches: a main series Roger Langridge wrote and drew based on The Muppet Show that started with the 4-issue mini-series The Muppet Show Comic Book in March 2009 and was followed by the 4-issue mini-series The Treasure of Peg-Leg Wilson with an ongoing after which ran until October 2010. The second approach published a series of mini-series featuring different writers and artists creating public domain fairy tales with The Muppets including Robin Hood.

In September 2009, Boom! Kids began publishing a line of comic books featuring the Disney "Standard Characters" such as Mickey Mouse, Donald Duck, Goofy, and Pluto, the earliest characters animated by Walt Disney Studios. The line ultimately grew to six ongoing series:

- Donald Duck and Friends began with issue #347 from October 2009 picking up the numbering from Gemstone Publishing. Early issues featured the Italian-created Donald subseries entitled "DoubleDuck". From issue #363 to the series' end with #367, Donald Duck refocused on reprinting past classics from Carl Barks, Don Rosa, Jack Hannah, and William Van Horn along with new-to-the-US stories by Federico Pedrocchi and Giovan Battista Carpi.
- Uncle Scrooge continued the numbering from Gemstone Publishing series with issue #384 from September 2009 to issue #404 in June 2011. From issue #392 to issue #399, the series reprinted DuckTales comics from the early 1990s featuring Uncle Scrooge before spinning off a stand-alone DuckTales series featuring new original stories. With issue #400 to its ending with #404, the series re-focused on reprinting past classics from Carl Barks, Don Rosa, Daan Jippes, and Romano Scarpa.
- Mickey Mouse and Friends picked up the numbering of Gemstone Publishing's series with issue #296 by importing and translating the worldwide hit Wizards of Mickey series for the first time in English. The feature ran through issue #299 before Boom! Kids spun Wizards of Mickey off into its own series. With issue #304 the title was renamed Mickey Mouse and shifted focus to reprinting classic work from Floyd Gottfredson and Paul Murry along with new-to-the-US stories by Noel Van Horn, Romano Scarpa, and Byron Erickson.
- Walt Disney's Comics and Stories continued the numbering from the Gemstone Publishing run with issue #699 in September 2009 through issue #720 in June 2011. Boom! Kids also released an archival collection of Walt Disney's Comics and Stories first few issues in one volume called Walt Disney's Comics and Stories Archives.
- Spinning out of Mickey Mouse and Friends, Wizards of Mickey debuted in January 2010 and ran for 8 issues.
- Spinning out of Donald Duck and Friends, DuckTales debuted in May 2011 and ran for 6 issues.
- Boom! Kids also brought Don Rosa's best-selling 1995 Eisner Award-winning The Life and Times of Scrooge McDuck back into print in two hardcover editions along with The Life and Times of Scrooge McDuck Companion.
- Other hardcovers that collected past classics like Walt Disney's Valentine's Classics and Walt Disney's Christmas Classics featured work from Carl Barks, Walt Kelly, Floyd Gottfredson, Daan Jippes, and Romano Scarpa.

In June 2010, Boom! Kids began publishing a line of comic books based on series and characters from Disney Afternoon television shows. The line ultimately grew to three series starring Disney Afternoon characters. Boom! began publishing comics based on the Darkwing Duck TV show. Eighteen issues were published before the series wrapped up in October 2011. A 4-part crossover story with Disney's DuckTales titled "Dangerous Currency" ran before the series ended, with parts 1 and 3 in DuckTales #5 and #6 and parts 2 and 4 running in Darkwing Duck #17 and #18. Launching in May 2011, KaBoom! published six issues based on the television show DuckTales. Notable video game designer Warren Spector wrote the series and the fifth and sixth issues featured a crossover with Darkwing Duck in the storyline "Dangerous Currency".

- Spinning out of Walt Disney's Comics and Stories, Disney's Hero Squad featured the Ultraheroes in their own adventures for eight issues before the series ended.

Other licensed series Boom! publishes through KaBoom! include Charles Schulz's Peanuts, Jim Davis' Garfield, and Frederator series Bravest Warriors and Bee and Puppycat.

==== Other titles ====
- In December 2010, Boom! published an eight-issue series based on Chip 'n Dale Rescue Rangers.
- On December 27, 2011, KaBoom! announced it had acquired the rights to publish comic books based on the TV show Adventure Time from Cartoon Network. The series is written by Ryan North, author of the webcomic Dinosaur Comics, with art from Ice Age: Iced In artists Shelli Paroline and Braden Lamb.
- KaBoom! published the original series Snarked written and drawn by two-time Harvey Award winner Roger Langridge. The series launched with a stand-alone $1 #0 issue in August 2010. It ended in September 2012.
- In December 2011, KaBoom! announced it had acquired the rights to do comic books based on 20th Century Fox and Blue Sky Studios' Ice Age movies.
- In March 2010, KaBoom! released an original Peanuts graphic novel that was an adaptation of the Happiness Is a Warm Blanket, Charlie Brown animated special. Then in November 2011, KaBoom! released a $1 stand-alone Peanuts #0 one-shot as an introduction to new, original stories debuting in Peanuts #1–4 (January–April 2012).
- In agreement with Paws, Inc., Boom! Studios launched in May 2012 a monthly Garfield comic book, with the first issue featuring a story written by Mark Evanier (who has supervised Garfield and Friends and The Garfield Show) and illustrated by Jim Davis's long-time assistant Gary Barker.
- A comic book adaptation of Bravest Warriors was announced at San Diego Comic-Con on July 12, 2012, by Boom! The series began publication on October 24, 2012.
- An eight-issue comic book series based on Steven Universe was first released in August 2014. It was written by Jeremy Sorese and illustrated by Coleman Engle. It ended in March 2015. In 2016, a four-issue miniseries named Steven Universe and the Crystal Gems was released. It was written by Joseceline Fenton and illustrated by Chrystin Garland featuring covers by Kat Leyh. In February 2017, an ongoing series was released, written by Melanie Gillman and Grace Kraft, and illustrated by Katy Farina, Rii Abrego, Meg Omac, and Kat Hayashida. In August 2018, a five-issue miniseries named Steven Universe Harmony was released. It is written by S.M. Vidaurri, illustrated by Mollie Rose, and covered by Marguerite Sauvage. In April 2015, a one-shot issue called the Greg Universe Special was released. It features Liz Prince, Jeremy Sorese, Kelly Turnbull, and Lauren Zuke. In December 2016, another one-shot issue called the 2016 Special was released, and features Ayme Sotuyo.
- A five-issue miniseries named Ruinworld was released in July 2018. It is written and illustrated by Derek Laufman.
- A four-issue miniseries named Capture Creatures ran from November 2014 to February 2015. It was written by Frank Gibson and illustrated by Rebecca Dreistadt.
- A four-issue miniseries named Abigail and the Snowman ran from December 2014 to March 2015. It was created by Roger Langridge.
- A five-issue miniseries named Mega Princess ran from November 2016 to April 2017. It was written by Kelly Thompson and illustrated by Brianne Drouhard.
- An eight-issue comic book series based on The Amazing World of Gumball ran from June 2014 to March 2015. The comic book series was created by Frank Gibson and Tyson Hesse.
- An eight-issue comic book series based on Rocko's Modern Life ran from December 2017 to September 2018. It was written by Ryan Ferrier and illustrated by Ian McGinty.
- A four-issue miniseries named Brave Chef Brianna ran in 2017. It was written by Sam Sykes and illustrated by Selina Espiritu.
- An 11-issue comic book series based on Bee and Puppycat ran from May 2014 to April 2016. Based on the series created by Natasha Allegri, the comic book series features Allegri, Garrett Jackson, Frank Gibson, Rebecca Dreidstadt, Tait Howard, Madeline Flores, Ian McGinty, Anissa Espinosa, T. Zysk, Madeline Rupert, Coleman Engle, Amy Fleck, Pranas Naujokaitis, Chrystin Garland, Flynn Nicholls, Meredith McClaren, Andrew Lorenzi, Joy Ang, Carey Pietsch, Wook-Jin Clark, Shanna Matuszak, David Caleron, Liz Fleming, Reimena Yee, Patrick Seery, Ji in Kim, Ko Takeuchi, and Mami Harada.

=== Boom! Box ===
Experimental and "gleeful" imprint that publishes content for kids and adults.

==== Originals ====
Boom! Box was launched in 2013 by editor Shannon Watters. Boom! Box's first title was The Midas Flesh from Ryan North, Shelli Paroline, and Braden Lamb, the same team behind Boom!'s Adventure Time comic. It followed this series up with Lumberjanes from Watters, ND Stevenson, Grace Ellis, and artist Gus Allen. Originally published as a mini-series, Lumberjanes was a big enough hit to become an ongoing, ultimately running for 75 issues and a one-shot finale, with spin-off comics consisting of 3 original graphic novels and 4 annual one-shot specials. Since issue 18, all Lumberjanes comic books are written by Watters and Kat Leyh. Other Boom! Box series include Teen Dog by Jake Lawrence, Giant Days by John Allison and Max Sarin, and a Cyanide & Happiness collection, Punching Zoo.

- An eight-issue miniseries named The Backstagers ran from August 2016 to March 2017. It was written by James Tynion IV and illustrated by Rian Sygh.
- A 12-issue miniseries named Jonesy ran from February 2016 to April 2017. It was written by Sam Humphries and illustrated by Caitlyn Rose Boyle.
- A 12-issue miniseries named By Night ran from June 2018 to June 2019. It was written by John Allison and illustrated by Christine Larsen.
- A four-issue miniseries named Welcome to Wanderland ran from September 2018 to February 2019. It was written by Jacqueline Ball illustrations by Maddi Gonzalez.
- There are 4 one-shot issues based on Lumberjanes. In 2015, Beyond Bay Leaf was released, and features Faith Erin Hicks and Rosemary Valero-O'Connell. In 2016, Making the Ghost of It was released, and features Kelly Thompson, Jen Wang, Savanna Ganucheau, and Christine Norrie. In 2017, Faire and Square was released, and features Holly Black, Gaby Epstein, Marina Julia, and cover artist Ru Xu. In 2018, A Midnight Summer's Scheme was released, and features Nicole Andelfinger, Maddi Gonzalez, Brittney Williams, and cover artist Natacha Bustos.
- A three-issue graphic novel miniseries called Nuclear Winter was released in May 2018, January 2019, and September 2019. It is written and illustrated by Caroline Breault, who is credited as Cab.
- A four-issue miniseries named Slam! ran from November 2016 to February 2017. It was written by Pamela Ribon and illustrated by Veronica Fish. A sequel miniseries called Slam! The Next Jam ran in late 2017. It was written by Ribon and illustrated by Marina Julia, featuring covers by Fish.
- An ongoing series called Fence was first released in November 2017. It is written by C. S. Pacat and illustrated by Johanna the Mad. Since Issue 7, the covers are done by Hamlet Machine.
- A four-issue miniseries called Dodge City ran from March 2018 to June 2018. It is written by Josh Trujillo and illustrated by Cara McGee.
- A graphic novel called Hollow based on "The Legend of Sleepy Hollow" that was published in 2022.

==== Licenses ====
- Boom! initiated an ongoing Munchkin comic book series beginning January 2015. It ended in January 2017.
- A graphic novel based on Clueless called Senior Year was released in August 2017. It is written by Amber Benson & Sarah Kuhn and illustrated by Siobhan Keenan.

=== Boom! Town ===
The publisher launched an imprint from 2010 to 2012 called Boom! Town focusing on "literary comics". The first release through the imprint was a set of Robert Crumb Trading Cards. The first book published via the imprint, Wheeler's I Thought You Would Be Funnier won the Eisner Award in 2011.

==== Originals ====
- "The Show Must Go On" — collecting uncollected Roger Langridge series including "Fred the Clown" material as well as "Mugwump" strips. (October 2011)

=== Archaia ===
Boom! acquired Archaia Entertainment in June 2013 and made the company an imprint.

== Distribution ==
All of Boom! Studios' single-issue comic books and graphic novels have been distributed to the Direct Market exclusively by Diamond Comics Distributors since 2018.

Boom!'s graphic novels have been distributed to the book trade via Simon & Schuster in the United States since 2009, HarperCollins in Canada, Titan Books in the United Kingdom, and Diamond Book Distributors internationally.

== Awards ==
- 2005 Wizard Magazine "Best New Publisher"
- 2009 Diamond Gem Awards "Comic Book Publisher of the Year (Under 4%)"
- 2010 Harvey Awards "Best Original Graphic Publication For Younger Readers" "The Muppet Show Comic Book" by Roger Langridge
- 2010 Diamond Gem Awards "Comic Book Publisher of the Year (Under 4%)"
- 2011 Diamond Gem Awards "Comic Book Publisher of the Year (Under 4%)"
- 2011 Eisner Awards "Best Humor Publication": "I Thought You Would Be Funnier" by Shannon Wheeler
- 2011 Harvey Awards "Special Award for Humor": The Muppet Show Comic Book" by Roger Langridge
- 2012 Diamond Gem Awards "Licensed Comic Book of the Year": Adventure Time #1 – Diamond Gem Awards
- 2012 Eisner Awards
  - "Best Writer" Mark Waid, Irredeemable, Incorruptible (BOOM!); Daredevil (Marvel Comics)
  - "Best Publication for Kids Age 8–12 "Snarked!" by Roger Langridge
- 2013 Diamond Gem Awards "Comic Book Publisher of the Year (Under 4%)"
- 2013 Eisner Awards "Best Publication for Kids Age 8–12" Adventure Time by Ryan North, Shelli Paroline, and Braden Lamb
- 2013 Harvey Awards
  - "Best Original Graphic Publication For Younger Readers" Adventure Time by Ryan North, Shelli Paroline, and Braden Lamb
  - "Special Award for Humor": Adventure Time by Ryan North, Shelli Paroline, and Braden Lamb
- 2014 Harvey Awards
  - "Best Graphic Album Previously Published": Mouse Guard: The Black Axe v3
  - "Best Original Graphic Publication For Younger Readers" Adventure Time by Ryan North, Shelli Paroline, and Braden Lamb
  - "Special Award for Humor": Adventure Time by Ryan North, Shelli Paroline, and Braden Lamb
- 2014 Diamond Gem Awards "Comic Book Publisher of the Year (Under 4%)"
- 2015 Diamond Gem Awards "Comic Book Publisher of the Year (Under 4%)"
- 2015 Harvey Awards
  - "Best Original Graphic Publication For Younger Readers" Lumberjanes by Shannon Watters, Grace Ellis, and ND Stevenson
  - "Best Graphic Album of Original Work" Jim Henson's The Musical Monsters of Turkey Hollow by Roger Langridge and Jim Henson
  - "Best Graphic Album of Previously Published Work" Mouse Guard: Baldwin the Brave and other tales, by David Petersen
- 2016 Harvey Awards
  - "Best Original Graphic Publication For Younger Readers" Lumberjanes by Shannon Watters, Grace Ellis, and ND Stevenson
  - "Best Single Issue or Story" Peanuts: A Tribute to Charles M. Schulz
  - "Best Anthology" Peanuts: A Tribute to Charles M. Schulz
  - "Best Domestic Reprint Project" Crimson Vol. 1
  - "Special Award for Excellence in Presentation" Peanuts: A Tribute to Charles M. Schulz by Scott Newman
- 2016 Diamond Gem Awards "Comic Book Publisher of the Year (Under 4%)
- 2018 Diamond Gem Awards "Comic Book Publisher of the Year (Under 3%)
- 2019 Diamond Gem Awards
  - Licensed Comic of the Year with Buffy the Vampire Slayer #1
  - Best Comic Book of the Year ($3.99 or under) for Once and Future
  - Best New Comic Book Series for Once and Future

== Award nominations ==
- 2009 "Comic Book of the Year Over 3.00" Irredeemable
- 2009 "Reprint TP or HC of the Year" Irredeemable v1
- 2010 "Best Continuing Series" Irredeemable Eisner Award
- 2010 "Best New Series" Irredeemable Eisner Award
- 2010 "Best New Series" Irredeemable Harvey Award
- 2010 "Best New Series" Do Androids Dream of Electric Sheep Eisner Award
- 2010 "Best Writer" Mark Waid: Irredeemable & The Incredibles Eisner Award
- 2010 "Best Writer" Mark Waid: Irredeemable Harvey Awards
- 2010 "Best Cover Artist" John Cassaday: Irredeemable Eisner Award
- 2010 "Best Cover Artist" Sean Phillips: 28 Days Later Eisner Award
- 2010 "Best Humor Publication": "The Muppet Show Comic Book" Roger Langridge Eisner Award
- 2010 "Best Cartoonist" Roger Langridge "The Muppet Show Comic Book" Harvey Awards
- 2010 "Special Award for Humor In Comics" Roger Langridge "The Muppet Show Comic Book" Harvey Awards
- 2011 "Best Inker" Damian Couciero for "Hawks of Outremer"
- 2011 "Special Award for Humor In Comics" Roger Langridge "The Muppet Show Comic Book" Harvey Awards
- 2011 "Special Award for Humor In Comics" Shannon Wheeler "I Thought You Would Be Funnier" Harvey Awards
- 2011 "Best Anthology" CBGB edited by Ian Brill Harvey Awards
- 2011 "Best Writer" Mark Waid: Irredeemable Harvey Awards
- 2013 "Best New Series" Adventure Time Eisner Award
- 2013 "Best Humor Publication" Adventure Time Eisner Award
- 2013 "Best Publication for Teens 13–17" Adventure Time Eisner Award
- 2014 Harvey Awards "Best Artist" Jeff Stokely for Six Gun Gorilla
- 2014 Harvey Awards "Best Cartoonist" David Peterson for Mouse Guard
- 2014 Harvey Awards "Best Letterer" Steve Wands for Adventure Time
- 2014 Harvey Awards "Best Letterer" Britt Wilson for Adventure Time with Fionna and Cake
- 2014 Harvey Awards "Best Inker" Vanesa R. Del Rey for Hit
- 2014 Harvey Awards "Best Inker" Brian Stelfreeze for Day Men
- 2014 Harvey Awards "Best Cover Artist" Brian Stelfreeze for Day Men
- 2014 Harvey Awards "Most Promising New Talent" Jeff Stokely for Six Gun Gorilla
- 2014 Harvey Awards "Best New Series" for Six Gun Gorilla
- 2014 Harvey Awards "Best New Series" for "Suicide Risk"
- 2014 Harvey Awards "Best Continuing or Limited Series" for "Hit"
- 2014 Harvey Awards "Best Anthology" for "Mouse Guard: Legends of the Guard v2"
- 2014 Harvey Awards "Best Anthology" for "Spera v3"
- 2014 Harvey Awards "Best Anthology" for "Thrilling Adventure Hour"
- 2014 Harvey Awards "Best Graphic Album: Original" for "The Reason For Dragons"
- 2014 Harvey Awards "Best Graphic Album: Previously Published" for "Mouse Guard: v3 The Black Axe"
- 2014 Harvey Awards "Best Graphic Album: Previously Published" for "Polarity"
- 2014 Harvey Awards "Best Single Issue or Story" for "Adventure Time Annual #1"
- 2014 Harvey Awards "Best Single Issue or Story" for "Suicide Risk #5"
- 2014 Harvey Awards "Best Domestic Reprint Project" for "Fraggle Rock Classics v2"
- 2014 Harvey Awards "Best American Edition of Foreign Material" for "The Killer v4"
- 2014 Harvey Awards "Special Award for Humor in Comics" Ryan North for "Adventure Time"
- 2014 Harvey Awards "Special Award for Excellence in Presentation" for "Thrilling Adventure Hour"
- 2014 Harvey Awards "Best Original Graphic Publication for Younger Readers" for "Adventure Time"
- 2014 Gemmie Awards "Comic Book of the Year – Over $3.00" for "Big Trouble in Little China #1"
- 2014 Gemmie Awards "Best New Comic Book Series" for Lumberjanes
- 2014 Gemmie Awards "Original Graphic Novel of the Year" for "Adventure Time Original GN Vol. 3: Seeing Red"
- 2014 Gemmie Awards "Anthology of the Year" for "Spera: Ascension of the Starless"
- 2014 Gemmie Awards "Best All-Ages Series" for "Adventure Time"
- 2014 Gemmie Awards "Best Free Comic Book Day Book" for "KaBOOM! Summer Blast"

== Digital comics ==
On January 3, 2008, Boom! became the first comic book company to offer a digital download of a comic book on the day and date of its release, partnering with MySpace Comic Books.

One year later, on January 6, 2009, Boom! teamed with MySpace Comic Books again to offer a free digital day-and-date release for Hexed along with the "5 for 500" program, sending five copies at no cost to the top 500 retailers in the direct market.

On March 23, 2011, the same day as the publication of the first issue of the comic book series based on Hellraiser, Boom! released a free original Prelude to Hellraiser short story co-written by Clive Barker as a downloadable PDF to promote the release.

To promote the release in July 2011 of the first issue of Elric: The Balance Lost, Boom! published the Elric Free Online Prelude featuring a free eight-page web comic.

In anticipation of the opening of the film Rise of the Planet of the Apes, Boom! serialized a free digital comic story that served as a prelude to the film.

=== Alternate reality gaming ===
On March 4, 2009, Boom! Studios announced Mark Sable's latest series Unthinkable. To promote the launch of the book, Boom! created an alternate reality game to be played during the time pre-orders were due.

=== Boom! App ===
On June 15, 2010, Boom! was the second comic book company to launch a branded app following Marvel's April app launch.

== See also ==
- List of Boom! Studios publications
- Recharged
