= Susan Daigle-Leach =

Comics illustrator

Susan Daigle-Leach (born 1960), also known as Susan F. Daigle and Sue Daigle, is an American comic book and cover colorist, letterist, production manager, illustrator, and fine artist, known mostly for her work on Disney comics during the 1980s, 1990s, and 2000s with licensees Gladstone Publishing (1987-1998) and Gemstone Publishing (2003-2008), where she was the main colorist next to her husband Gary A. Leach and Scott Rockwell.

In 1983, Daigle-Leach graduated with a Bachelor of Fine Arts degree from Kutztown University of Pennsylvania, and in 1987 began working for Another Rainbow and Gladstone Publishing.

While at Gladstone and Gemstone, Daigle-Leach colored 17,000 pages of the entire Disney comics by Carl Barks for the 141-volume Carl Barks Library in Color (1991-1996) alone (not to be confused with Another Rainbow's earlier, 30-volume Carl Barks Library published 1983–1990 in black and white), as well as the North-American editions of most of the Disney comics by Don Rosa. In 1995, Daigle-Leach was nominated for the prestigious Will Eisner Award - Best Colorist for her work at Gladstone. In 2007 and 2008 respectively, she was nominated for a Harvey Award in the same category for her work at Gemstone.

She is married to Gary Leach, who has also worked for Disney-licensed comics.
