= Donald Duck and the Mummy's Ring =

1943 Donald Duck comic book story by Carl Barks

- Cover of Four Color #29, art by Carl Buettner
- Story code: W OS 29-01
- Story: Carl Barks
- Ink: Carl Barks
- Date: September 1943
- Hero: Donald Duck; Huey, Dewey and Louie
- Pages: 28
- Layout: 4 rows per page
- First publication: Four Color #29

"Donald Duck and the Mummy's Ring" is a 28-page Disney comics story written and drawn by Carl Barks. It was first published in Donald Duck Four Color #29 (Sept 1943) with two backup stories also by Barks, "The Hard Loser" and "Too Many Pets". It was the first long Donald Duck adventure story written and drawn by Barks. The story has been reprinted many times, including in The Carl Barks Library (1984) and The Carl Barks Library in Color (1994).

== Plot ==
Donald Duck reads an article in the newspaper about two Ancient Egyptian mummies being sent back to Egypt from the local museum, by request of the Bey of El Dagga. Donald and his three nephews, Huey, Dewey, and Louie, set off for the museum to see the mummies before they're taken away. On the way to the museum, Donald is handed a mysterious ring by a disheveled man, who claims that it's brought him bad luck. Donald and the boys notice that the ring has the mark of three serpents, of the same design as the mummies that they're going to see. A robber demands that Donald hand over the ring, but the boys save their uncle from the robber's clutches. Huey discovers that the ring is stuck on his finger.

At the museum, the four peek inside one of the mummy cases, and notice that a ring is missing from the display. The Bey of El Dagga's menacing emissaries startle them, and a museum guard tells the ducks that the Bey is demanding the mummies be sent back to Egypt under threat of war. Huey goes back to the mummy's exhibit to get his cap, but he doesn't return. Certain that the emissaries have kidnapped Huey, the other ducks manage to get jobs as deck hands on the ship carrying the mummies back to Egypt.

On board the ship, Donald, Dewey, and Louie are attacked by one of the mummies, who steals some sausages. Donald peeks through a window and sees both mummies sitting up in their cases, eating. After causing a disturbance, the ducks are put in the brig, where they reason that Huey and the kidnapper must be disguised as the mummies. By the time the ducks are let out of the brig, the emissaries have loaded the mummies on their river barge to ferry them up the river. The ducks follow in an abandoned boat, which they hitch to a steamship, getting to the Bey's palace in time to see the mummies delivered.

Donald, Dewey, and Louie interrupt the Bey's ceremonies, telling him that the mummies are alive, and one of them has the ring with three serpents. Huey and the kidnapper are unwrapped -- the kidnapper turns out to be the robber they saw on the street -- and the Bey, grateful to get the ring back, gives the ducks a new boat along with a box full of gold and jewels.

== Development ==
Donald Duck and the Mummy's Ring was the first long Donald Duck adventure story written and drawn by Barks, and it established patterns that would soon become standards for Barks' Donald Duck stories. Donald and the nephews are swept up into an adventure with life-and-death stakes, although there are many comedic gags to lighten the tone. There are nasty criminals, mistaken identities, humorous coincidences, and a surprise ending. The boys also get a tour of an exotic setting, with many detailed panels of Egyptian landmarks, painstakingly copied from Barks' collection of National Geographic magazines.

The inspiration for the story came from a magazine article about ancient Egyptian burial customs, including the tradition of placing everyday items and food in the grave with the deceased. Another inspiration was the 1932 Boris Karloff film The Mummy and subsequent horror films, which pictured mummies as animate, vengeful monsters.

As this was the first adventure story that Barks wrote, the editors asked him to submit an outline. In a 1973 interview, Barks recalled:

I submitted a sort of script in advance there. I don't remember how detailed a thing it was, but I believe I kind of roughed out the drawings and sent the sheets in, or took the sheets and left them there. [Western Publishing editor] Eleanor Packer... read through what I had planned... and I remember that she suggested some big changes, and she asked me to draw up these changes. Well, I did. I drew up the changes, and I think I sent the roughs of those changes back. She looked them over, and sent back word to go ahead with my original version, my original version was better. So after that, I never had any trouble.

The Egyptian landmarks pictured during Donald's trip up the Nile River include the Great Sphinx of Giza (pg 17), the skyline of Cairo (pg 17 and 18), the Pyramid of Meidum (pg 19), the Pyramid of Djoser (pg 20), the Mortuary Temple of Hatshepsut (pg 21 and 22) and the Colossi of Memnon (pg 28). Barks copied these from "Daily Life in Ancient Egypt", a 90+ page article in the October 1941 National Geographic, by William C. Hayes from the Metropolitan Museum of Art. There is also a caricature of Disney animator Chuck Couch in a wanted poster on page 7 of the story.

== Reception ==
Comics historian Michael Barrier takes a dim view of the story: "As in Pirate Gold, comedy is notably lacking... In The Mummy's Ring there is again a prevailing seriousness (and a heavy reliance on National Geographic for the Egyptian settings). There are threats of death that Donald and his nephews must take seriously and a torrent of dialogue-heavy balloons once the story's mystery is solved. As in other early comic-book stories from Western's Los Angeles office, the sense is of clumsy imitation of comic strips that more successfully combined comedy and adventure, like Roy Crane's Wash Tubbs and Floyd Gottfredson's Mickey Mouse."

Thomas Andrae agrees that the story is flawed: "Barks' synthesis of realistically drawn settings and fantasy-based cartoon characters created a unique, hybrid art form. The realistic backgrounds and ambience of his stories invited readers to fully identify with the ducks' plight as quasi-human figures undergoing the same travails readers might experience... However, Barks had not yet mastered the fusion of these two styles. He often failed to integrate background detail within a scene, and those visuals remained just an excuse for sightseeing... As a consequence, these artifacts function as picture postcards, insufficiently contributing to the narrative."

The comic presciently deals with the repatriation of antiquities to their country of origin. This has become a major issue in the contemporary art world and among museums; an example is the dispute between Yale and Peru over artifacts from Machu Picchu.

== Reprints ==
In 1965, Gold Key Comics planned to reprint "Donald Duck and the Mummy's Ring", but found they were missing photostats of three of the pages, and the original art had been destroyed. The publisher asked Barks to redraw the three pages, and the story was published with the redrawn pages in Uncle Scrooge and Donald Duck #1 (Sept 1965).

In 1984, when Another Rainbow published the collection The Carl Barks Library, they restored the three pages from the original comic using a computer. The three redrawn pages were also included in the volume, in a smaller size. The restored art was also used in 1994 when Gladstone Comics reprinted the story in The Carl Barks Library in Color.

== See also ==
- List of Disney comics by Carl Barks
