= Island in the Sky (comics) =

- Story code: W US 29-01
- Story: Carl Barks
- Ink: Carl Barks
- Date: June 15, 1959
- Hero: Scrooge McDuck
- Pages: 18
- Layout: 4 rows per page
- Appearances: Scrooge McDuck; Donald Duck; Huey, Dewey, and Louie
- First publication: Uncle Scrooge #29; March 1960

"Island in the Sky" is a Disney comics story written and drawn by Carl Barks. It was published in Uncle Scrooge #29, March 1960.

The asteroid 2730 Barks was named after Barks by a scientist at Cornell University who was inspired by the story.

== Plot ==
Scrooge and his nephews go on a quest in outer space to find an island in space to store his money on. They land on a small asteroid occupied by aliens and (normal) birds. Donald accidentally chases the birds away to a nearby planet, and with them, the only source of food for the aliens is gone. The aliens who were friendly at first are now mad at the Ducks. Huey, Dewey and Louie make Scrooge find a solution for the problem they caused. Scrooge sacrifices his fuel to get the aliens to the tropical planet nearby them. This detour results in a fuel stop at the space gas station, which gives Scrooge a high bill.

This story also shows how the emotions Scrooge has can be more important than his money.

== See also ==
- "Island in the Sky" served as the title story to Fantagraphics' The Complete Carl Barks Disney Library Vol. 24 - Uncle Scrooge: "Island in the Sky"
- List of Disney comics by Carl Barks
