= Pluto Saves the Ship =

1942 Disney comic book story

- Story code: W LFC 7-01
- Story: Carl Barks, Jack Hannah, Nick George
- Ink: unknown
- Date: July 1942
- Hero: Pluto
- Pages: 51
- Layout: 3 rows per page
- Appearances: Pluto
- First publication: Large Feature Comics #7

"Pluto Saves the Ship" is a 51-page black-and-white comic book story scripted by writers Carl Barks, Jack Hannah and Nick George from a plot devised possibly by a publisher, and drawn by Disney animation layout artist Bruce Bushman. It was originally printed in Dell Comics' Large Feature Comics #7 in July 1942, and is one of the first American Disney comics ever made that was not reprinted from newspaper comic strips. It is Barks' first comic book work, and Pluto's first comic book adventure. This was followed in October 1942 by Donald Duck Finds Pirate Gold, the Disney characters' first entry in Dell's Four Color anthology series.

In the story, Pluto foils Nazi saboteurs on a Navy cruiser. Barks said later that "it was only a one-shot special designed to take advantage of the wartime jitters."

Barks wrote the story with Jack Hannah and Nick George, fellow animators at the Disney Studio. The story was partly inspired by two Pluto cartoons that Barks worked on, Bone Trouble (1940) and The Army Mascot (1942).

Barks only produced two stories that took place in the Mickey Mouse universe; the other is "The Riddle of the Red Hat" (Four Color #79, published August 1945).

"Pluto Saves the Ship" has been reprinted in many European countries over the last few decades. For a long time, it's only reprint in English was in The Carl Barks Library black and white hardcover collection, in 1988. It would eventually be included in the Fantagraphics Books collection The Complete Carl Barks Disney Library in August 2025.

== See also ==
- List of Disney comics by Carl Barks
