= Museum of Western Art =

The Museum of Western Art may refer to:

- The National Museum of Western Art in Tokyo, Japan
- The Museum of Western Art (Kerrville, Texas) in Kerrville, Texas, United States
- The Leanin' Tree Museum of Western Art in Boulder, Colorado, United States
- the Museum of Western and Oriental Art in Kyiv, Ukraine
