= The Carl Barks Collection =

The first box of the Norwegian edition. Disney

The Carl Barks Collection is a series of books from the Disney licensee Egmont containing all Disney comics and covers written and/or drawn by Carl Barks, collected in chronological order. It also includes significant textual materials (articles and analysis) written by editor Geoffrey Blum.

== Publication ==
It was published from 2005 to 2008 in Denmark, Norway, Sweden, and Germany. It was also published by Sanoma in Finland, although one year after the other countries. The complete set consists of 30 books collected in 10 slipcase boxes, constituting about 8,000 pages (including the articles) or some 500 comic book stories by Barks. The series was only available by subscription. In many aspects the series is similar to Carl Barks Library (CBL) but differs by being published in colour, organizing the stories by date of publication, using only unchanged artwork and containing material not used in CBL, much of it newly discovered and previously unpublished. Blum was a contributing editor to CBL, and his familiarity with the Barks canon and its historic background is the principal reason Egmont hired him. Blum has drawn not only on material that appeared previously in CBL but new research he has undertaken which has resulted in a number of significant discoveries and fresh perspectives on Barks and his creations.

A similar edition was published in Spain, by Planeta deAgostini. It differed from the other editions by not having Blum's articles (having, instead, articles signed by the Barks specialist Alfons Moliné), it was smaller and not in boxes, and it was sold through comic book shops. A book was published approximately every three months, but the collection was stopped after volume 4.

In Norway, a six-volume follow-up series called Carl Barks Ekstra was published 2009–2012. It contains the most of Barks's works outside his Disney comics production. The last four volumes were also published in Sweden, and the last book with paintings and drawings was published in Norway, Sweden, Germany, and Finland.

== Editions ==
Country	Title	Numbered copies
Denmark	Carl Barks' Samlede Værker	No. 1 – 1800
Finland	Carl Barksin kootut	No. 1 – 3200
Germany	Carl Barks Collection	No. 1 – 3333
Norway	Carl Barks Samlede Verk	No. 1 – 2500
Sweden	Carl Barks Samlade Verk	No. 1 – 2000
Spain	Biblioteca Carl Barks	Not numbered

== Volumes ==
Book	Period
I	1942–1943
II	1944–1945
III	1945–1946
IV	1947
V	1947–1948
VI	1948–1949

Book	Period
VII	1949–1950
VIII	1950–1951
IX	1951–1952
X	1952–1953
XI	1953
XII	1954

Book	Period
XIII	1954–1955
XIV	1955–1956
XV	1956–1957
XVI	1957
XVII	1957–1958
XVIII	1958–1959

Book	Period
XIX	1959
XX	1959–1960
XXI	1960
XXII	1960–1961
XXIII	1961–1962
XXIV	1962–1963

Book	Period
XXV	1963–1964
XXVI	1964–1965
XXVII	1965–1966
XXVIII	1966–1968
XXIX	1968–1972
XXX	1972–2000

Extra	Content
E1	Index
E2	Calgary Eye-Opener
E3	Who is who in Duckburg
E4	The Warner stories
E5	Storyboards
E6	Paintings

== Other collections ==
Collections of Carl Barks' Disney comics have been published in the United States in The Carl Barks Library and The Complete Carl Barks Disney Library, in France in La dynastie Donald Duck - Intégrale Carl Barks (24 volumes planned), in Italy in La grande dinastia dei paperi (48 volumes), in Brazil in As Obras Completas de Carl Barks (41 volumes) and Coleção Carl Barks Definitiva (Brazilian edition of The Complete Carl Barks Disney Library), and in Greece in Η μεγάλη βιβλιοθήκη του Καρλ Μπαρκς (discontinued after 16 of the 48 planned volumes) and Η Μεγάλη Βιβλιοθήκη Disney (48 volumes).

== See also ==
- List of Disney comics by Carl Barks
- List of non-Disney comics by Carl Barks
