= Manuel Gonzales =

American comics artist

- Born: March 3, 1913 Cabañas de Sayago, Zamora, Spain
- Died: March 31, 1993 (aged 80) Los Angeles, California, U.S.
- Area: Cartoonist
- Awards: 1963 Mousecar Award; 1966 Hyperion Club Award; 2017 Disney Legend
- Spouse: LaVonne Gonzales (m. 1941)
- Children: 2

Manuel Gonzales (March 3, 1913 – March 31, 1993) was a Spanish-American Disney comics artist. He worked on the Mickey Mouse comic strip from 1940 to 1981.

== Biography ==
Gonzales was born in Cabañas de Sayago, Zamora, Spain.

Gonzales emigrated from Spain to the U.S. in 1918 via Ellis Island.

He grew up in Westfield, Massachusetts, where he went to school and picked tobacco during summer jobs as a boy. He later lived and went to art school in New York City. His father, walking home from work one late-summer evening in 1936, tore a flyer from a telephone pole and gave it to Gonzales after dinner. The flyer invited artists to bring their portfolios to the Metropolitan Museum of Art for a job opportunity. Gonzales was interviewed and hired on the spot, given $200 and told to report in two weeks to the Hyperion Studios in Los Angeles to work as an animator. His first assignment was as an "inbetweener" on what was to be the first animated full-length major motion picture, Snow White and the Seven Dwarfs.

He was also as an artist in the Publicity Department creating pencil art for publicity drawings and Good Housekeeping Disney children's pages.

Later working in the comic strip department, Gonzales took over the illustrating of the Mickey Mouse comic strip's Sunday page from Floyd Gottfredson in 1938. Only interrupted by his military service for the U.S. in World War II from 1942 to 1945, Gonzales performed this job until his retirement in 1981. During the war, he worked for the U.S. Army as an artist animating short newsreel clips promoting war bonds and the war effort.

In 1941, Gonzales married his wife LaVonne, with whom he had two sons, Thomas and Daniel.

Bill Walsh wrote the scripts for the Sunday pages from 1946 to 1963. These pages told funny stories from Mickey Mouse's everyday life (Mickey was portrayed as a "guy next door", a middle-class citizen with a normal life), as well as doing sometimes surrealistic gags featuring Gonzales' specialty, Goofy. Gonzales and Walsh also introduced a new character to the Disney universe, the intelligent and witty bird Ellsworth, in 1950. In general, the Sunday pages have status as better than Gottfredson's daily gags of the time (also written by Walsh).

Besides the Sunday pages, Gonzales worked on other Disney comic strips and illustrations. He inked Donald Duck and Scamp dailies, illustrated newspaper comic adaptations of different Disney films, like Song of the South, and illustrated some Disney books. He also worked on Disney's annual Christmas comic strip from 1960 to 1969.

Gonzales received a "Mousecar" award and a Hyperion Club award personally from Walt Disney during his career. The Mousecar was a much coveted award, given to the artists who had most significantly impacted the company's success. Modeled after the Oscar, which is awarded annually for achievement by the Academy of Motion Picture Arts and Sciences, the Mousecar is a bronze statuette of Mickey Mouse in his trademark pose on a black base.

Gonzales died in Los Angeles
