= Lost in the Andes! =

1949 Donald Duck comic book story

- Lost in the Andes! comic book cover
- Story code: W OS 223-02
- Story: Carl Barks
- Ink: Carl Barks
- Date: April 1949
- Hero: Donald Duck
- Pages: 32
- Layout: 4 rows per page
- Appearances: Donald Duck; Huey, Dewey and Louie
- First publication: Four Color Comics #223

"Lost in the Andes!" is a Donald Duck story written by Carl Barks and published in Dell Comics' Four Color Comics #223 in April 1949. Donald and his nephews go to South America to find the mythical chickens that lay square eggs (actually, they are cubic eggs).

== Plot ==
The story features Donald and his three nephews as members of a museum-sponsored expedition searching for the source of a number of square "artifacts" held in the Duckburg museum, recently revealed to be square eggs when Donald drops one and it cracks open. There is a rising interest, both scientific and financial, to find the source of these eggs and the chicken that laid them. However, the only thing known about them is that they came from Peru and were found somewhere in the Andes.

During their journey to South America, Donald's nephews use some of the old square eggs from the museum to make an omelette. This causes the members of the expedition to come down with food poisoning. By the time their boat reaches Peru, the only ones that have recovered enough to continue the expedition are the youngest in the group and the lowest in hierarchy — Donald and his nephews.

Their search for the square eggs in the Andes seems hopeless, as the local population sees them either as insane or as suckers to be fooled into buying artificial eggs. Finally, they meet a very old man who tells them of how his father once came into possession of square stones similar to their own. The father had found them on the body of an American explorer who had emerged from a neighboring valley, which is covered in perpetual mist. The explorer, who had wandered the valley to the point of exhaustion, died soon afterward. The old man's father later sold some of the "stones" in a local village and these ended up as the square eggs at the museum.

The Ducks follow the dead man's path into the mists and after days of effort they find a populated valley in the mountains, hidden by the mists. The inhabitants are entirely cubical with square heads and noses. They speak with an old American Southern accent taught to them by their previous visitor, the dead man, Professor Rhutt Betlah (a wordplay on Rhett Butler) from Birmingham, Alabama, who had discovered their valley during the late 19th century.

During their stay in the valley, which the professor has named "Plain Awful", Huey, Dewey, and Louie blow some bubble gum bubbles, which is against the law in Plain Awful: It's forbidden to produce any round objects in the valley. The only way to get out of the valley and avoid capital punishment is for Huey, Dewey, and Louie to produce square bubbles. They manage to do that by teaching the square chickens to chew gum and blow bubbles. The nephews hid the chickens under their shirts and pretend they made the bubbles themselves.

The Ducks convince the very hospitable locals to let them go. The latter are sad to see them go, because they were a source of information from the outside world to their small and isolated civilization. They give the Ducks a compass that the professor had left in Plain Awful, having been placed in a museum as a piece of art and, in return, they teach them square dancing. When they leave the valley, in one of Barks' scarce moralizing moments, Donald remarks that the people in Plain Awful "had so little of anything, yet they were the happiest people we've ever known."

Bringing two square chickens and eggs with them, the Ducks again struggle to escape from the mists. Finally, when they do manage it, they are nearly exhausted. The two chickens are still alive, but they had to eat the eggs. It's only when they return to Duckburg, that they realize the entire expedition was a failure: both of the chickens are male and naturally can't reproduce. The story ends with Donald now giving an angry response to whoever mentions eggs and chicken to his face.

== Analysis ==
Barks had heard jokes about square eggs and chickens since his childhood and decided to use them as an idea for a story. The plot combines themes and story elements that Barks often used in his stories. A mythical creature or legendary artifact that leads to an expedition, the long search for information, often seeming futile, an isolated civilization hidden from the outside world thanks to its natural environment, the Ducks bringing new ideas with them but sometimes faced as threats, and the characters ending up defeated or empty-handed are all such themes.

The story has been considered as representative of Barks' work in general and successful in its own right and has often been declared as one of his best. References to this story are often in the works of Barks' "successors" and fans of his work in general. In a 1962 interview, Barks agreed that "my best story, technically, is probably the square egg one."

In Carl Barks and the Disney Comic Book: The Myth of Modernity, Thomas Andrae writes, "Barks' portrait of the Inca culture is ambivalent. Although he finds them superior to capitalist modernity, Barks rejects a romantic primitivism that elevates preindustrial cultures to the status of utopias. Plain Awful, as its name suggests, is radically flawed. It is conformist and shackled by custom... Barks' story implies that primitive societies have a spirit of community and generosity but are so conformist and custom-bound that they lack tolerance and freedom of expression."

== Impact ==
In Norway, the story gained a lot of attention when first published in the Norwegian language in 1963. The translator chose an archaic and slightly garbled version of Nynorsk for the mountain-dwellers, and this was widely seen as an insult. In later editions, the language was altered (the most recent editions however restore the Nynorsk dialogue, as the translation has come to be regarded as a classic in its own right). Thus, through the Norwegian language struggle, this story got quite a lot of attention in Norwegian media. It was later proclaimed as the best Donald Duck comic of all time by the Norwegian readers.

A scene from the Disney animated feature Dumbo, where Dumbo blows square bubbles of alcohol-tinted water, might have inspired the part of the story where Donald's nephews blow square bubbles of chewing gum.

Don Rosa wrote and drew a sequel, Return to Plain Awful, where Donald and his nephews return to the secluded civilization, this time bringing Scrooge McDuck with them. The Plain Awful's square egg is also featured in Don Rosa's The Buckaroo of the Badlands, part three of his famous The Life and Times of Scrooge McDuck.

The story's legacy, coupled with Barks' own love for it, made it launch the first The Complete Carl Barks Disney Library volume.

== See also ==
- "Lost in the Andes!" served as the title story to Fantagraphics' The Complete Carl Barks Disney Library Vol. 7 - Donald Duck: "Lost in the Andes"
- List of Disney comics by Carl Barks
- Donald Duck in comics
