= Gary Leach =

American comics writer

- Born: 1957 (age 68–69) Columbia, Missouri, U.S.
- Area: Writer

Gary Leach (born 1957) is an American comics writer, translator, art director, production manager, letterer and colorist who has worked for several Disney comics publishers since the 1980s, namely Gladstone Publishing, Gemstone Publishing and IDW Publishing.

His first three Disney comics were illustrated by Don Rosa and published in 1988: they are the Scrooge McDuck story The Paper Chase, the Donald Duck story Rocket Reverie and the Scrooge McDuck story Fiscal Fitness. Subsequent stories written by Leach featured artwork by various artists, including William Van Horn who drew three of them. All of Leach's comics take place in the Donald Duck universe. Leach wrote several articles about Disney comics, and is credited for the ideas of several covers.

He has edited several manga titles for VIZ Media. Partial list: Red River, Arata: The Legend, D.Gray-man, Istuwaribito, O-Parts Hunter, Cheeky Angel, Uzumaki.

He is married to Susan Daigle-Leach, who has also worked for Disney-licensed comics as colorist and letterist.
