= Bone Trouble =

- Promotional poster
- Directed by: Jack Kinney
- Story by: Carl Barks
- Produced by: Walt Disney
- Starring: Lee Millar; Clarence Nash
- Music by: Frank Churchill; Paul J. Smith
- Animation by: John Lounsbery; Reuben Timmins; Norm Ferguson; Jack Gayek; Art Fitzpatrick
- Color process: Technicolor
- Production company: Walt Disney Productions
- Distributed by: RKO Radio Pictures
- Release date: June 28, 1940
- Running time: 8:44
- Country: United States
- Language: English

Bone Trouble is a 1940 animated short produced by Walt Disney, and directed by Jack Kinney. It stars Pluto and Butch the Bulldog, in the latter's first appearance.

== Plot ==
The short begins with Pluto waking up in his dog house. Pluto is hungry, but birds have eaten his dish. He hears snoring over the nextdoor fence. Butch the Bulldog, who is sleeping nearby, has a bone which Pluto attempts to steal without awakening him. Pluto has to sneak past trees and tires to reach to the bone. After a couple of attempts, he successfully steals it. Before Pluto can enjoy the bone, an angry Butch shows up, having awoken some time before. A surprised Pluto takes the bone and Butch chases him.

Butch chases Pluto through town and into a deserted carnival. During the chase, they pass over posters of a strongman and belly dancer. They go through the Tunnel of Love ride where Pluto reverses the chase. Butch loses sight of Pluto when Pluto goes into a hall of mirrors. In each mirror, Pluto sees a reflection of himself shaped like a different animal. Pluto has fun with the mirrors until he sees Butch again. Pluto takes advantage of one set of mirrors to successfully scare Butch off. He winks at his reflections and goes off with the bone.

== Production ==
The story was written by Carl Barks, who was soon to become a prolific and popular Disney comics artist and writer. This story partly inspired Barks' first Disney comics story, Pluto Saves the Ship, in 1942.

== Cast ==
- Lee Millar as Pluto
- Clarence Nash as Butch

== Releases ==
- 1940 – theatrical release

== Home media ==
The short was released on December 7, 2004, on Walt Disney Treasures: The Complete Pluto: 1930–1947. It was released to Disney+ between September 5 and 8, 2023.

Additional releases include:

- 2002 – Old Yeller DVD
