= Duckster =

In-house award

The Duckster is an in-house award given by The Walt Disney Company for a variety of reasons, including service to the company as well as to the community as a whole. The award was first presented by Disney founder Walt Disney in 1952.

Susan Henning (Hayley Mills' body double for The Parent Trap) was presented with a Duckster by Walt Disney inscribed for "Best Unseen Performance by an Actress".

Disney storyman and director Jack Hannah at some point obtained one of the unawarded extra statues from the studio; it was auctioned in 2005 for $4,813. That same year Martha Torge's Duckster was auctioned for $5,701. In 2015 the Duckster awarded to Eddie Fisher was auctioned for $1,565.44.

In 2009, a Duckster was awarded at the D23 Expo to Jennifer Sleeper, the winner of a contest to create the official portrait of Donald Duck for his 75th birthday.

== Origin of the word ==
"Duckster" is a combination of the words "Oscar" and "Duck" (as in Donald Duck).

== List of recipients ==
- Martha Torge
- Carl Barks
- Clarence Nash
- Bob Karp
- Al Taliaferro
- Susan Henning
- Herb Golden
- Marvin Goldfarb
- Jennifer Sleeper
- Madeleline Wheeler
- Max Westebbe
- Eddie Fisher
- Bob Dorfman

== See also ==
- Mousecar
