= Carl Barks =

American cartoonist (1901–2000)

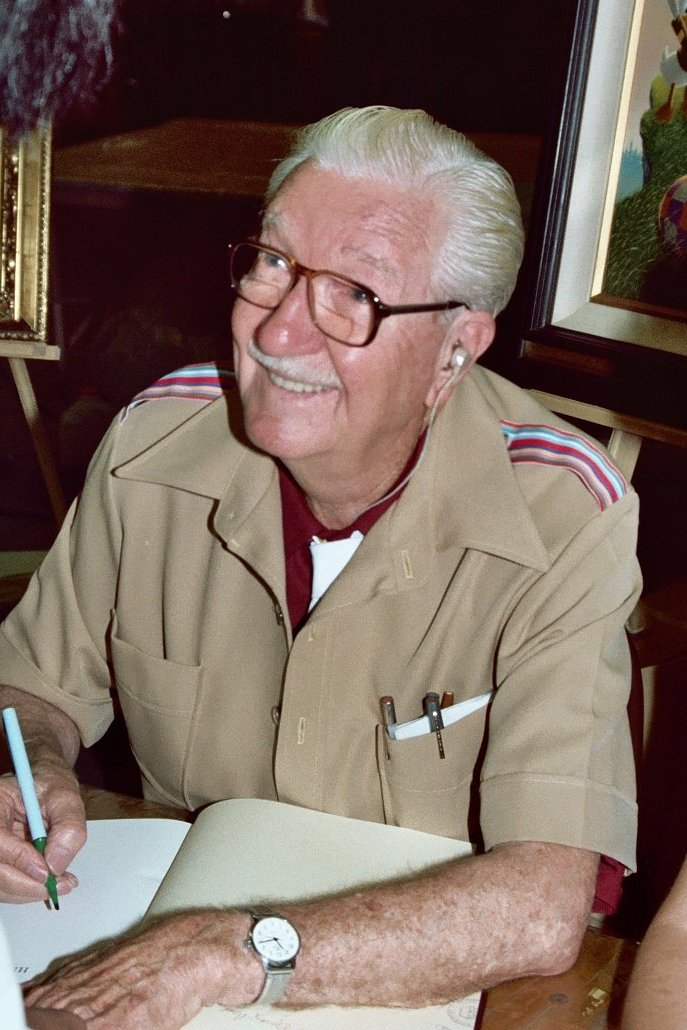
- Barks in 1982
- Born: March 27, 1901 Near Merrill, Oregon, U.S.
- Died: August 25, 2000 (aged 99) Grants Pass, Oregon, U.S.
- Area(s): Writer, Penciller, Artist, Inker
- Notable works: Scrooge McDuck, Huey, Dewey, and Louie, Daisy Duck, Gyro Gearloose, Gladstone Gander, The Junior Woodchucks, Beagle Boys, Flintheart Glomgold, Magica De Spell, Neighbor J. Jones, Glittering Goldie, Cornelius Coot, John D. Rockerduck; Oil paintings of his duck characters
- Spouses: Pearl Turner (m. 1923; div. 1929) Clara Balken (m. 1932; div. 1951) Garé Williams (m. 1954; died 1993)
- Children: 2

Carl Barks (March 27, 1901 – August 25, 2000) was an American cartoonist, author, and painter. He is best known for his work in Disney comic books, as the writer and artist of the first Donald Duck stories and as the creator of Scrooge McDuck. He worked anonymously until late in his career; fans dubbed him "The Duck Man" and "The Good Duck Artist". In 1987, Barks was one of the three inaugural inductees of the Will Eisner Comic Book Hall of Fame.

Barks worked for Walt Disney Productions and Western Publishing where he created Duckburg and many of its inhabitants, such as Scrooge McDuck (1947), Gladstone Gander (1948), the Beagle Boys (1951), The Junior Woodchucks (1951), Gyro Gearloose (1952), Cornelius Coot (1952), Flintheart Glomgold (1956), John D. Rockerduck (1961) and Magica De Spell (1961).

He has been named by animation historian Leonard Maltin as "the most popular and widely read artist-writer in the world". Will Eisner called him "the Hans Christian Andersen of comic books." Beginning especially in the 1980s, Barks' artistic contributions would be a primary source for animated adaptations such as DuckTales and its 2017 remake.

== Biography ==
Barks was born near Merrill, Oregon, to William Barks and his wife, Arminta Johnson. He had an older brother named Clyde. His paternal grandparents were David Barks and his wife Ruth Shrum. Barks' maternal grandparents were Carl Johnson and his wife, Suzanna Massey, but little else is known about his ancestors. Barks was the descendant of Jacob Barks, who came to Missouri from North Carolina c. 1800. They lived in Marble Hill in Bollinger County. Jacob Barks' son Isaac was the father of the David Barks noted above.

=== Childhood ===
According to Barks's description of his childhood, he lived in relative seclusion. His parents owned one square mile (2.6 km^{2}) of land that served as their farm. The nearest neighbor lived one-half mile (800 m) away, but he was more an acquaintance to Barks's parents than a friend. The closest school was about two miles (3.2 km) away and Barks had to walk that distance every day. The rural area had few children, though, and Barks later remembered that his school had only about eight or ten students including himself. He had high praise for the quality of the education he received in that small school. "Schools were good in those days," he used to say. The lessons lasted from nine o'clock in the morning to four o'clock in the afternoon and then he had to return to the farm. There he remembered not having anybody to talk to, as his parents were busy, and he had little in common with his brother.

In 1908, William Barks (in an attempt to increase the family income) moved with his family to Midland, Oregon, some miles north of Merrill, to be closer to the new railway lines. He established a new stock-breeding farm and sold his produce to the local slaughterhouses.

Nine-year-old Clyde and seven-year-old Carl worked long hours there. But Carl later remembered that the crowd which gathered at Midland's market place made a strong impression on him. This was expected, as he was not used to crowds up until then. According to Barks, his attention was mostly drawn to the cowboys that frequented the market with their revolvers, strange nicknames for each other and sense of humor.

By 1911, they had been successful enough to move to Santa Rosa, California. There they started cultivating vegetables and set up some orchards. Unfortunately, the profits were not as high as William expected and they started having financial difficulties. William's anxiety over them was probably what caused his first nervous breakdown.

As soon as William recovered, he made the decision to move back to Merrill. The year was 1913, and Barks was already 12 years old; but, due to the constant moving, he had not yet managed to complete grade school. He resumed his education at this point and finally managed to graduate in 1916.

1916 served as a turning point in Barks's life for various reasons. First, Arminta, his mother, died in this year. Second, his hearing problems, which had already appeared earlier, had at the time become severe enough for him to have difficulties listening to his teachers talking. His hearing would continue to get worse later, but at that point he had not yet acquired a hearing aid. Later in life, he couldn't do without one. Third, the closest high school to their farm was five miles (8.0 km) away and even if he did enroll in it, his bad hearing was likely to contribute to his learning problems. He had to decide to stop his school education, much to his disappointment.

=== From job to job ===
Barks started taking various jobs but had little success in such occupations as a farmer, woodcutter, turner, mule driver, cowboy and printer. He later averred that from those jobs he learned how eccentric, stubborn, and unpredictable men, animals, and machines can be. At the same time he interacted with colleagues, fellow breadwinners who had satirical disposition towards even their worst troubles. Barks later declared that he was sure that if not for a little humor in their troubled lives, they would certainly go insane. It was an attitude towards life that Barks would adopt. Later he would say it was natural for him to satirize the secret yearnings and desires, the pompous style and the disappointments of his characters. According to Barks, this period of his life would later influence his best known fictional characters: Walt Disney's Donald Duck and his own Scrooge McDuck.

Donald's drifting from job to job was reportedly inspired by Barks's own experiences. So was his usual lack of success. And even in those that he was successful this would be temporary, just until a mistake or chance event caused another failure, another disappointment for the frustrated duck. Barks also reported that this was another thing he was familiar with.

Scrooge's main difference from Donald, according to Barks, was that he too had faced the same difficulties in his past but through intelligence, determination and hard work, he was able to overcome them. Or, as Scrooge himself would say to Huey, Dewey, and Louie: by being "tougher than the toughies and smarter than the smarties." In Barks's stories Scrooge would work to solve his many problems, even though the stories would often point out that his constant efforts seemed futile at the end.

Through both characters Barks would often exhibit his rather sarcastic sense of humor. It seems that this difficult period for the artist helped shape many of his later views in life that were expressed through his characters.

=== Professional artist ===
At the same time, Barks had started thinking about turning a hobby that he always enjoyed into a profession: that of drawing. Since his early childhood he had spent much of his free time doing drawings on a wide variety of subjects. He attempted to improve his style by copying the drawings of his favorite comic strip artists from the newspapers where he could find them. As he later said, he wanted to create his own facial expressions, figures and comical situations in his drawings but wanted to study the master comic artists' use of the pen and their use of color and shading.

Among his early favorites were Winsor McCay (mostly known for Little Nemo) and Frederick Burr Opper (mostly known for Happy Hooligan) but he would later study any style that managed to draw his attention.

At age 16, he was mostly self-taught but at this point he decided to take some lessons through correspondence. He only followed the first four lessons and then had to stop because his working left him with little free time. But as he later said, the lessons proved very useful in improving his style.

By December 1918, he left his father's home to attempt to find a job in San Francisco, California. He worked for a while in a small publishing house while attempting to sell his drawings to newspapers and other printed material with little success.

=== First and second marriages ===
While he continued drifting through various jobs, he met Pearl Turner (1904–1987). In 1921 they married and had two daughters:

- Peggy Barks (1923–1963)
- Dorothy Barks (1924–2014)

In 1923 he returned to his paternal farm in Merrill in an attempt to return to the life of a farmer, but that ended soon. He continued searching for a job while attempting to sell his drawings. He soon managed to sell some of them to Judge magazine and then started having success submitting to the Minneapolis-based Calgary Eye-Opener, a racy men's cartoon magazine of the era. He was eventually hired as editor and scripted and drew most of the contents while continuing to sell occasional work to other magazines. His salary of $90 per month was considered respectable enough for the time. A facsimile of one of the racy magazines he did cartoons for in this period, Coo Coo #1, was published by Hamilton Comics in 1997.

Meanwhile, he had his first divorce. He and Pearl were separated in 1929 and divorced in 1930. After he moved to Minneapolis, Minnesota, where Calgary-Eye-Opener had its offices, he met Clara Balken, who in 1938 became his second wife.

=== Disney ===
In November 1935, when he learned that Walt Disney was seeking more artists for his studio, Barks decided to apply. He was approved for a try-out which entailed a move to Los Angeles, California. He was one of two in his class of trainees who was hired into Walt Disney Productions. His starting salary was 20 dollars a week. He started work at the studio in 1935, more than a year after the debut of Donald Duck on June 9, 1934, in the short animated film The Wise Little Hen.

Barks initially worked as an inbetweener. This involved being teamed and supervised by one of the head animators who did the key poses of character action (often known as extremes) for which the inbetweeners did the drawings between the extremes to create the illusion of movement. While an inbetweener, Barks submitted gag ideas for cartoon story lines being developed and showed such a knack for creating comical situations that by 1937 he was transferred to the story department. His first story sale was the climax of Modern Inventions, for a sequence where a robot barber chair gives Donald Duck a haircut on his bottom.

In 1937, when Donald Duck became the star of his own series of cartoons instead of co-starring with Mickey Mouse and Goofy as previously, a new unit of storymen and animators was created devoted solely to this series. Though he originally just contributed gag ideas to some duck cartoons, by 1937 Barks was (principally with partner Jack Hannah) originating story ideas that were storyboarded and (if approved by Walt) put into production. He collaborated on such cartoons as Donald's Nephews (1938), Donald's Cousin Gus (1939), Mr. Duck Steps Out (1940), Timber (1941), The Vanishing Private (1942) and The Plastics Inventor (1944).

=== The Good Duck Artist ===
Omelet opening page

Unhappy at the emerging wartime working conditions at Disney, and bothered by ongoing sinus problems caused by the studio's air conditioning, Barks quit in 1942. Shortly before quitting, he moonlighted as a comic book artist, contributing half the artwork for a one-shot comic book (the other half of the art being done by story partner Jack Hannah) titled Donald Duck Finds Pirate Gold. This 64-page story was adapted by Donald Duck comic strip writer Bob Karp from an unproduced feature, and published in October 1942 in Dell Comics Four Color Comics #9. It was the first original Donald Duck story produced for an American comic book and also the first involving Donald and his nephews in a treasure hunting expedition, in this case for the treasure of Henry Morgan. Barks would later use the treasure hunting theme in many of his stories. This actually was not his first work in comics, as earlier the same year Barks along with Hannah and fellow storyman Nick George scripted Pluto Saves the Ship, which was among the first original Disney comic book stories published in the United States.

After quitting the Disney Studio, Barks relocated to the Hemet/San Jacinto area in the semi-desert Inland Empire region east of Los Angeles where he hoped to start a chicken farm.

When asked which of his stories was a favorite in several interviews Barks cited the ten-pager in Walt Disney's Comics and Stories #146 (Nov. 1952) in which Donald tells the story of the chain of unfortunate events that took place when he owned a chicken farm in a town which subsequently was renamed Omelet. Likely one reason it was a favorite is that it was inspired by Barks' own experiences in the poultry business.

But to earn a living in the meantime he inquired whether Western Publishing, which had published Pirate Gold, had any need for artists for Donald Duck comic book stories. He was immediately assigned to illustrate the script for a ten-page Donald Duck story for the monthly Walt Disney's Comics and Stories. At the publisher's invitation he revised the storyline and the improvements impressed the editor sufficiently to invite Barks to try his hand at contributing both the script and the artwork of his follow-up story. This set the pattern for Barks' career in that (with rare exceptions) he provided art (pencil, inking, solid blacks and lettering) and scripting for his stories.

The Victory Garden, that initial ten-page story published in April, 1943 was the first of about 500 stories featuring the Disney ducks Barks would produce for Western Publishing over the next three decades, well into his purported retirement. These can be mostly divided into three categories:

- One-page gag stories like "Coffee for Two" and "Sorry to be Safe". These one-pagers were usually printed in black and white (or black and white and red) on the inside front, inside back, and outside back covers. These stories focused on one joke.
- Ten-pagers, comedic Donald Duck stories that were the lead for the monthly flagship title Walt Disney's Comics and Stories, whose circulation peaked in the mid-1950s at 3 million copies sold a month.
- Humorous adventure stories, usually 24-32 pages in length. In the 1940s these were one-shots in the Four Color series (issued 4–6 times a year) that starred Donald and his nephews. Starting in the early 1950s (and through his retirement) Barks' longer stories were almost exclusively published in Uncle Scrooge's own quarterly title.

Barks' artistic growth during his first decade in comics saw a transformation from rather rudimentary storytelling derived from his years as an animation artist and storyman into a virtuoso creator of complex narratives, notably in his longer adventure tales. According to critic Geoffrey Blum, the process that saw its beginnings in 1942's Pirate Gold first bore its full fruit in 1950's "Vacation Time", which he describes as "a visual primer for reading comics and understanding ... the form".

He surrounded Donald Duck and nephews Huey, Dewey, and Louie with a cast of colorful characters, such as the aforementioned Scrooge McDuck, the wealthiest duck in the world; Gladstone Gander, Donald's obscenely lucky cousin; inventor Gyro Gearloose; the persistent Beagle Boys; the sorceress Magica De Spell; Scrooge's rivals Flintheart Glomgold and John D. Rockerduck; Daisy's nieces April, May and June; Donald's neighbor Jones, and The Junior Woodchucks organization.

Barks's stories (whether humorous adventures or domestic comedies) often exhibited a wry, dark irony born of hard experience. The ten-pagers showcased Donald as everyman, struggling against the cruel bumps and bruises of everyday life with the nephews often acting as a Greek chorus commenting on the unfolding disasters Donald wrought upon himself. Yet while seemingly defeatist in tone, the humanity of the characters shines through in their persistence despite the obstacles. These stories found popularity not only among young children but adults as well. Despite the fact that Barks had done little traveling, his adventure stories often had the duck clan globe-trotting to the most remote or spectacular of places. This allowed Barks to indulge his penchant for elaborate backgrounds that hinted at his thwarted ambitions of doing realistic stories in the vein of Hal Foster's Prince Valiant.

=== Third marriage ===
As Barks blossomed creatively, his marriage to Clara deteriorated. This is the period referred to in Barks' famed quip that he could feel his creative juices flowing while the whiskey bottles hurled at him by a tipsy Clara flew by his head. They were divorced in 1951, his second and last divorce. In this period Barks dabbled in fine art, exhibiting paintings at local art shows. It was at one of these in 1952 he became acquainted with fellow exhibitor Margaret Wynnfred Williams (1917 – March 10, 1993), nicknamed Garé. She was an accomplished landscape artist, some of whose paintings are in the collection of the Leanin' Tree Museum of Western Art. During her lifetime, and to this day, note cards of her paintings are available from Leanin' Tree. Her nickname appears as a store name in the story "Christmas in Duckburg", featured on page 1 of Walt Disney's Christmas Parade #9, published in 1958. Soon after they met, she started assisting Barks, handling the solid blacks and lettering, both of which he had found onerous. They married in 1954 and the union lasted until her death.

=== No longer anonymous ===
People who worked for Disney (and its comic book licensees) generally did so in relative anonymity; stories would only carry Walt Disney's name and (sometimes) a short identification number. Prior to 1960 Barks' identity remained a mystery to his readers. However, many readers recognized Barks' work and drawing style and began to call him the Good Duck Artist, a label that stuck even after his true identity was discovered by fans in the late 1950s. Malcolm Willits was the first person to learn Barks's name and address, but two brothers named John and Bill Spicer became the first fans to contact Barks after independently discovering the same information. After Barks received a 1960 visit from the Spicer brothers and Ron Leonard, he was no longer anonymous, as word of his identity spread through the emerging network of comic book fandom fanzines and conventions.

=== Later life ===
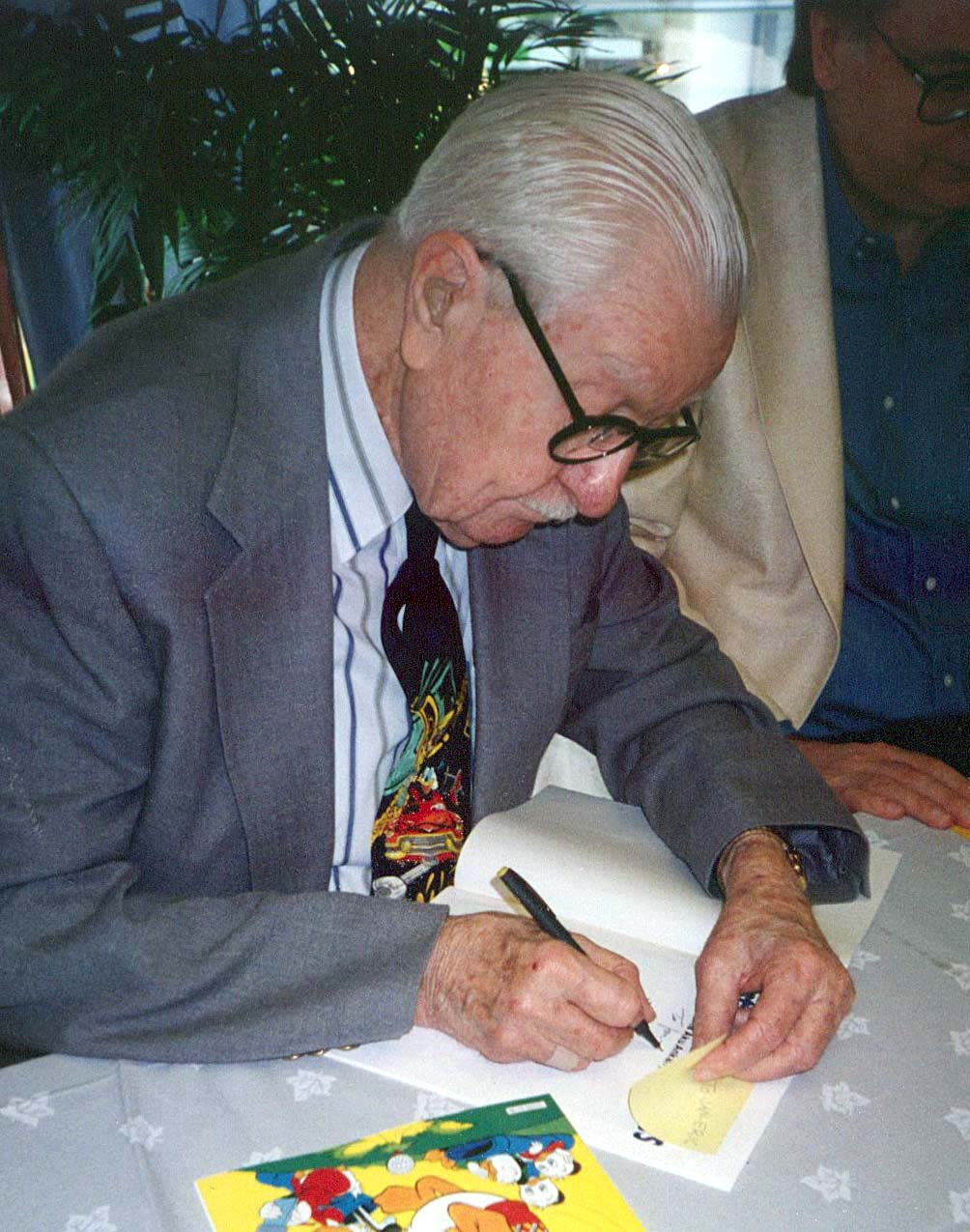
Barks visiting Finland in June 1994

Carl Barks retired in 1966, but was persuaded by editor Chase Craig to continue to script stories for Western. The last new comic book story drawn by Carl Barks was a Daisy Duck tale ("The Dainty Daredevil") published in Walt Disney Comics Digest issue 5 (Nov. 1968). When bibliographer Michael Barrier asked Barks why he drew it, Barks' vague recollection was no one was available and he was asked to do it as a favor by Craig.

He wrote one Uncle Scrooge story, and three Donald Duck stories. From 1970 to 1974, Barks was the main writer for the Junior Woodchucks comic book (issues 6 through 25). The latter included environmental themes that Barks first explored in 1957 ["Land of the Pygmy Indians", Uncle Scrooge #18]. Barks also sold a few sketches to Western that were redrawn as covers. For a time the Barkses lived in Goleta, California, before returning to the Inland Empire by moving to Temecula.

To make a little extra money beyond what his pension and scripting earnings brought in, Barks started doing oil paintings to sell at the local art shows where he and Garé exhibited. Subjects included humorous depictions of life on the farm and portraits of Native American princesses. These skillfully rendered paintings encouraged fan Glenn Bray to ask Barks if he could commission a painting of the ducks ("A Tall Ship and a Star to Steer Her By", taken from the cover of Walt Disney's Comics and Stories #108 by Barks). This prompted Barks to contact George Sherman at Disney's Publications Department to request permission to produce and sell oil paintings of scenes from his stories. In July 1971 Barks was granted a royalty-free license by Disney. When word spread that Barks was taking commissions from those interested in purchasing an oil of the ducks, much to his astonishment the response quickly outstripped what he reasonably could produce in the next few years.

Ode to the Disney Ducks

They ride tall ships to the far away,
and see the long ago.
They walk where fabled people trod,
and Yetis trod the snow.

They meet the folks who live on stars,
and find them much like us,
With food and love and happiness
the things they most discuss.

The world is full of clans and cults
abuzz as angry bees,
And Junior Woodchucks snapping jeers
at Littlest Chickadees.

The ducks show us that part of life
is to forgive a slight.
That black eyes given in revenge
keep hatred burning bright.

So when our walks in sun or shade
pass graveyards filled by wars,
It's nice to stop and read of ducks
whose battles leave no scars.

To read of ducks who parody
our vain attempts at glory,
They don't exist, but somehow leave
us glad we bought their story.

— Carl Barks, 1999

When Barks expressed dismay at coping with the backlog of orders he faced, fan/dealers Bruce Hamilton and Russ Cochran suggested Barks instead auction his paintings at conventions and via Cochran's catalog Graphic Gallery. By September 1974 Barks had discontinued taking commissions.

At Boston's NewCon convention, in October 1975, the first Carl Barks oil painting auctioned at a comic book convention ("She Was Spangled and Flashy") sold for $2,500. Subsequent offerings saw an escalation in the prices realized.

In 1976, Barks and Garé went to Boston for the NewCon show, their first comic convention appearance. Among the other attendees was famed Little Lulu comic book scripter John Stanley; despite both having worked for Western Publishing this was the first time they met. The highlight of the convention was the auctioning of what was to that time the largest duck oil painting Barks had done, "July Fourth in Duckburg", which included depictions of several prominent Barks fans and collectors. It sold for a then record high amount: $6,400.

Soon thereafter a fan sold unauthorized prints of some of the Scrooge McDuck paintings, leading Disney to withdraw permission for further paintings. To meet demand for new work Barks embarked on a series of paintings of non-Disney ducks and fantasy subjects such as Beowulf and Xerxes. These were eventually collected in the limited-edition book Animal Quackers.

As the result of efforts by Star Wars producer Gary Kurtz and screenwriter Edward Summer, Disney relented and, in 1981, allowed Barks to produce an oil painting called Wanderers of Wonderlands for a limited edition book entitled Uncle Scrooge McDuck: His Life and Times. The book collected 11 classic Barks stories of Uncle Scrooge colored by artist Peter Ledger along with a new Scrooge story by Barks done storybook style with watercolor illustrations, "Go Slowly, Sands of Time". After being turned down by every major publisher in New York City, Kurtz and Summer published the book through Celestial Arts, which Kurtz acquired partly for this purpose. The book went on to become the model for virtually every important collection of comic book stories. It was the first book of its kind ever reviewed in Time magazine and subsequently in Newsweek, and the first book review in Time with large color illustrations.

In 1977 and 1982, Barks attended San Diego Comic-Con. As with his appearance in Boston, the response to his presence was overwhelming, with long lines of fans waiting to meet Barks and get his autograph.

In 1981, Bruce Hamilton and Russ Cochran, two long-time Disney comics fans, decided to combine forces to bring greater recognition to the works of Carl Barks. Their first efforts went into establishing Another Rainbow Publishing, the banner under which they produced and issued the award-winning book The Fine Art of Walt Disney's Donald Duck by Carl Barks, a comprehensive collection of the Disney duck paintings of this artist and storyteller. Not long after, the company began producing fine art lithographs of many of these paintings, in strictly limited editions, all signed by Barks, who eventually produced many original works for the series.

In 1983, Barks relocated one last time to Grants Pass, Oregon, near where he grew up, partly at the urging of friend and Broom Hilda artist Russell Myers, who lived in the area. The move also was motivated, Barks stated in another famous quip, by Temecula being too close to Disneyland and thus facilitating a growing torrent of drop-in visits by vacationing fans. In this period Barks made only one public appearance, at a comic book shop near Grants Pass.

In 1983, Another Rainbow took up the daunting task of collecting the entire Disney comic book oeuvre of Barks—over 500 stories in all—in the ten-set, thirty-volume Carl Barks Library. These oversized hardbound volumes reproduced Barks' pages in pristine black and white line art, as close as possible to the way he would originally draw them, and included a great number of special features, articles, reminiscences, interviews, storyboards, critiques, etc. This monumental project was finally completed in mid-1990.

In 1985, a new division was founded, Gladstone Publishing, which took up the then-dormant Disney comic book license. Gladstone introduced a new generation of Disney comic book readers to the storytelling of Barks, Paul Murry, and Floyd Gottfredson, as well as presenting the first works of modern Disney comics artists Don Rosa and William Van Horn. Seven years after Gladstone's founding, the Carl Barks Library was revived as the Carl Barks Library in Color, as full-color, high-quality squarebound comic albums (including the first-ever Carl Barks trading cards).

From 1993 to 1998, Barks' career was managed by the "Carl Barks Studio" (Bill Grandey and Kathy Morby—they had sold Barks original art since 1979). This involved numerous art projects and activities, including a tour of 11 European countries in 1994, Iceland being the first foreign country he ever visited. Barks appeared at the first of many Disneyana conventions in 1993. Silk screen prints of paintings along with high-end art objects (such as original water colors, bronze figurines and ceramic tiles) were produced based on designs by Barks.

During the summer of 1994 and until his death, Barks and his studio personally assigned Peter Reichelt, a museum exhibition producer from Mannheim, Germany, as his agent for Europe. Publisher "Edition 313" put out numerous lithographs. In 1997, tensions between Barks and the Studio eventually resulted in a lawsuit that was settled with an agreement that included the disbanding of the Studio. Barks never traveled to make another Disney appearance. He was represented by Ed Bergen, as he completed a final project. Gerry Tank and Jim Mitchell assisted Barks in his final years.

During his Carl Barks Studio years, Barks created two more stories: the script for the final Uncle Scrooge story "Horsing Around with History", which was first published in Denmark in 1994 with Bill Van Horn art. The outlines for Barks' final Donald Duck story "Somewhere in Nowhere", were first published in 1997, in Italy, with art by Pat Block.

Austrian artist Gottfried Helnwein curated and organized the first solo museum-exhibition of Barks. Between 1994 and 1998 the retrospective was shown in ten European museums and seen by more than 400,000 visitors.

At the same time in spring 1994, Reichelt and Ina Brockmann designed a special museum exhibition tour about Barks' life and work. Also represented for the first time at this exhibition were Disney artists Al Taliaferro and Floyd Gottfredson. Since 1995, more than 500,000 visitors have attended the shows in Europe.

Reichelt also translated Michael Barrier's biography of Barks into German and published it in 1994.

=== Final days and death ===
Barks spent his final years in a new home in Grants Pass, Oregon, which he and Garé, who died in 1993, had built next door to their original home. In July 1999, he was diagnosed with chronic lymphocytic leukemia, a form of cancer arising from the white blood cells in the bone marrow, for which he received oral chemotherapy. However, as the disease progressed, causing him great discomfort, the ailing Barks decided to stop receiving treatment in June 2000. In spite of his terminal condition, Barks remained, according to caregiver Serene Hunicke, "funny up to the end".

The year before, Barks had told the university professor Donald Ault:

I have no apprehension, no fear of death. I do not believe in an afterlife. ... I think of death as total peace. You're beyond the clutches of all those who would crush you.

On August 25, 2000, shortly after midnight, Carl Barks died quietly in his sleep at the age of 99. He was interred in Hillcrest Memorial Cemetery in Grants Pass, beside Garé's grave.

== Influence ==
Barks' Donald Duck stories were rated #7 on The Comics Journal list of 100 top comics; his Uncle Scrooge stories were rated #20.

Steven Spielberg and George Lucas have acknowledged that the rolling-boulder booby trap in the opening scene of Raiders of the Lost Ark was inspired by the 1954 Carl Barks Uncle Scrooge adventure "The Seven Cities of Cibola" (Uncle Scrooge #7). Lucas and Spielberg have also said that some of Barks' stories about space travel and the depiction of aliens had an influence on them. Lucas wrote the foreword to the 1982 Uncle Scrooge McDuck: His Life and Times. In it he calls Barks' stories "cinematic" and "a priceless part of our literary heritage".

The Walt Disney Treasures DVD set Chronological Donald, Volume 2 includes a feature on Barks.

In Almere, Netherlands, a street was named after him: Carl Barksweg. The same neighborhood also includes a Donald Ducklaan and a Goofystraat.

Japanese animator and cartoonist Osamu Tezuka, who created manga such as Astro Boy and Black Jack, was a fan of Barks' work. New Treasure Island, one of Tezuka's first works, was partly influenced by "Donald Duck Finds Pirate Gold".

A 1949 Donald Duck ten-pager features Donald raising a yacht from the ocean floor by filling it with ping pong balls. In December 1965 Karl Krøyer, a Dane, lifted the sunken freight vessel Al Kuwait in the Kuwait Harbor by filling the hull with 27 million tiny inflatable balls of polystyrene. Krøyer denies having been inspired by this Barks story. Some sources claim Krøyer was denied a Dutch patent registration (application number NL 6514306) for his invention on the grounds that the Barks story was a prior publication of the invention. Krøyer later successfully raised another ship off Greenland using the same method, and several other sunken vessels worldwide have since been raised by modified versions of this concept. The television show MythBusters also tested this method and was able to raise a small boat.

Don Rosa, one of the most popular living Disney artists, and possibly the one who has been most keen on connecting the various stories into a coherent universe and chronology, considers (with few exceptions) all Barks' duck stories as canon, and all others as apocryphal. Rosa has said that a number of novelists and movie-makers cite Carl Barks as their 'major influence and inspiration'. Don Rosa created The Life and Times of Scrooge McDuck based on Carl Barks references in Scrooge McDuck stories.

When the news of Barks' passing was hardly covered by the press in America, "in Europe the sad news was flashed instantly across the airwaves and every newspaper — they realized the world had lost one of the most beloved, influential and well-known creators in international culture."

The video game Donald Duck: Goin' Quackers, released late in 2000, is dedicated to the memory of Carl Barks.

In 2010 Oregon Cartoon Institute produced a video about the influence of Carl Barks and Basil Wolverton on Robert Crumb.

Carl Barks drew an early Andy Panda comic book story published in New Funnies #76, 1943.

The first image ever to be displayed on an Apple Macintosh was a scan of Carl Barks' Scrooge McDuck.

In 1983, the C-type asteroid 2730 Barks was named after him. In a 1983 interview, Barks says that "Island in the Sky", a story about the Ducks traveling to the asteroid belt to find a place Uncle Scrooge can store his money, was his favorite story.

Carl Barks is featured as the main character in a comic strip from two cartoonists in a subplot in The Last Song of Manuel Sendero by Ariel Dorfman.

== Bibliography ==
- Coo Coo #1, Hamilton Comics, 1997 (a facsimile of one of the racy magazines Barks did cartoons for in the thirties).
- The Unexpurgated Carl Barks, Hamilton Comics, 1997 (contains cartoons drawn between 1928 and 1936 for Calgary Eye-Opener)
- The Carl Barks' Big Book of Barney Bear (ISBN 978-1-60010-929-4), 2011 collection edited by Craig Yoe and published by IDW of the Barney Bear and Benny Burro stories that originally appeared in Our Gang Comics #11–36 (May/June 1944 – June 1947); Barks' one substantial non-Disney series.
- Carl Barks Library, 1984–1990, 30 hardback volumes in black and white published by Another Rainbow Publishing.
- Carl Barks Library (graphic album format, in color) 1992–1998
- O Melhor da Disney: As Obras Completas de Carl Barks 2004–2008, 41 volume limited edition published by Abril Jovem in Brazil, compiling all the stories written by Barks, with his oil paintings as the cover art.
- The Carl Barks Collection 2005–2009, 30 volume limited edition published by Egmont in Norway, Sweden, Denmark, and Germany, and by Sanoma in Finland. Edited by Barks expert Geoffrey Blum.
- The Complete Carl Barks Disney Library 2011–present, hardback volumes with separate Uncle Scrooge and Donald Duck volumes from Fantagraphics Books.
- Uack! and Uack! presenta April 2014 – 2018, 40-volume incomplete edition with the collected stories written by Barks, including a few drawn by other artists, and previously unpublished stories, enriched with sketches and photographs. After the 23rd volume, the series got the name of "Uack! presenta, and includes stories by other artists, such as Al Taliaferro and Don Rosa. Published by Panini Comics in Italy.

== Filmography ==
Films where Barks served as storyman or story director include:

- Modern Inventions (May 29, 1937). Barks also drew many of the storyboards for the film.
- Donald's Ostrich (December 10, 1937).
- Self Control (February 11, 1938). Barks served as the story director.
- Donald's Better Self (March 11, 1938). Barks served as the story director.
- Donald's Nephews (April 15, 1938).
- Good Scouts (July 8, 1938). Barks served as the story director. Barks also drew many of the storyboards for the film.
- Donald's Golf Game (November 4, 1938). Barks served as the story director.
- Donald's Lucky Day (January 13, 1939). Barks also drew many of the storyboards for the film.
- The Hockey Champ (April 28, 1939). Barks served as the story director. Barks also drew many of the storyboards for the film.
- Donald's Cousin Gus (May 19, 1939). Barks served as the story director. Barks also drew many of the storyboards for the film.
- Sea Scouts (June 30, 1939). Barks served as the story director. Barks also drew many of the storyboards for the film.
- Donald's Penguin (August 11, 1939). Barks served as the story director.
- The Autograph Hound (September 1, 1939).
- Mr. Duck Steps Out (June 7, 1940). Barks served as the story director.
- Put-Put Troubles (June 19, 1940).
- Bone Trouble (June 28, 1940).
- Donald's Vacation (August 9, 1940).
- Window Cleaners (September 20, 1940). Barks also drew many of the storyboards for the film.
- Fire Chief (December 13, 1940). Barks also drew many of the storyboards for the film.
- Timber (January 10, 1941). Barks served as the story director. Barks also drew many of the storyboards for the film.
- Golden Eggs (March 7, 1941).
- Early to Bed (July 11, 1941). Barks also drew many of the storyboards for the film.
- Truant Officer Donald (August 1, 1941). Barks also drew many of the storyboards for the film.
- Old MacDonald Duck (September 12, 1941). Barks served as the story director. Barks also drew many of the storyboards for the film.
- Chef Donald (December 5, 1941). Barks served as the story director. Barks also drew many of the storyboards for the film.
- The Village Smithy (January 16, 1942).
- Donald's Snow Fight (April 10, 1942). Barks served as the story director. Barks also drew many of the storyboards for the film.
- Donald Gets Drafted (May 1, 1942). Barks served as the story director.
- The Army Mascot (May 22, 1942).
- The Vanishing Private (September 25, 1942). Barks served as the story director. Barks also drew many of the storyboards for the film.
- Sky Trooper (November 6, 1942).
- Bellboy Donald (December 18, 1942). Barks also drew many of the storyboards for the film.
- The Spirit of '43 (January 7, 1943).
- The Old Army Game (November 5, 1943). Barks also drew many of the storyboards for the film.
- Home Defense (November 26, 1943). Barks also drew many of the storyboards for the film.
- Trombone Trouble (February 18, 1944). Barks served as the story director. Barks also drew many of the storyboards for the film.
- The Plastics Inventor (September 1, 1944).

== Notable stories ==
- "Donald Duck Finds Pirate Gold", Four Color #9, October 1942
- "Donald Duck and the Mummy's Ring", Four Color #29, September 1943
- "Christmas on Bear Mountain", Four Color #178, December 1947, first appearance of Scrooge McDuck.
- "The Old Castle's Secret", Four Color #189 June 1948
- "Sheriff of Bullet Valley", Four Color #199, October 1948
- "Lost in the Andes!", Four Color #223, April 1949
- "Vacation Time", Vacation Parade #1, July 1950
- "A Financial Fable", Walt Disney's Comics and Stories #126, March 1951
- "Donald Duck in Old California!", Four Color #328, May 1951
- "A Christmas for Shacktown", Four Color #367, January 1952
- "Only a Poor Old Man", Four Color #386 (Uncle Scrooge #1), March 1952
- "Flip Decision", Walt Disney's Comics and Stories #149, June 1952
- "The Golden Helmet", Four Color #408, July 1952
- "Back to the Klondike", Four Color #456 (Uncle Scrooge #2), March 1953
- "Tralla La", Uncle Scrooge #6, June 1954
- "The Fabulous Philosopher's Stone", Uncle Scrooge #10, June 1955
- "The Golden Fleecing", Uncle Scrooge #12, December 1955
- "Land Beneath the Ground!", Uncle Scrooge #13, March 1956
- "The Money Well", Uncle Scrooge #21, March 1958
- "The Golden River", Uncle Scrooge #22, 1958
- "Island in the Sky", Uncle Scrooge #29, March 1960
- "North of the Yukon", Uncle Scrooge #59, September 1965

== Awards ==
- The Shazam Award for Best Writer (Humor Division) in 1970
- The Academy of Comic Book Arts Hall of Fame Award in 1973
- The Inkpot in 1977 from San Diego Comic-Con
- Inducted into the Eisner Awards Hall of Fame in 1987
- Inducted into the Jack Kirby Hall of Fame in 1987
- Inducted into the William Randolph Hearst Cartoon Hall of Fame.
- The Walt Disney Company bestowed a Duckster award in 1971 and their Disney Legends award in 1991
- The Comics Buyer's Guide Fan Award for Favorite Writer in 1996.
- The series Carl Barks Library received the Comics Buyer's Guide Fan Award for Favorite Reprint Graphic Novel/Album for 1996.

== Art materials ==
Barks was an enthusiastic user of Esterbrook pens, and used a Nº 356 model to ink and letter his Donald Duck comic-book pages.

I used a #356 Esterbrook art and drafting pen which could do everything from thin "fadeaways" to broad accented curve sweeps on foreground circles such as the ducks' forms. The trick of breaking in a new pen, I discovered, is to soak it for several minutes in the ink bottle. Then wipe off the ink and the pen's varnish. For some weird reason most new pens then start out flexible and free-flowing

— Letter to Scott Matheson, March 21, 1973

== See also ==
- Scrooge McDuck / The Junior Woodchucks / Disney comics
- The Carl Barks Library / The Carl Barks Library in Color (Gladstone Publishing)
- The Carl Barks Collection (Egmont; non-English) / The Complete Carl Barks Disney Library (Fantagraphics)
- List of Disney comics by Carl Barks / List of non-Disney comics by Carl Barks
- Inducks – Disney comics database / Donaldism – Disney comics fandom
- Flipism – Theory from one of Barks' stories
