= Mousecar =

In-house Walt Disney Company award (Mouscar)

The Mousecar is an in-house award given by The Walt Disney Company for a variety of reasons, including service to the company as well as to the community as a whole. The award was first presented by Disney founder Walt Disney to his brother Roy O. Disney in 1947.

In 2005, Riley Thomson's Mousecar was auctioned for $5,358. In 2013 Bernie Cobb's Mousecar was auctioned for $8,531.

== Origin of the word ==
"Mousecar" is a combination of the words "Oscar" and "Mouse" (as in Mickey Mouse).

== List of recipients ==
- Louis Armstrong
- Bernie Cobb
- Marc Davis
- Roy O. Disney
- Bob Dorfman
- Jim Gardner
- Kathie Lee Gifford
- Manuel Gonzales
- Benny Goodman
- Floyd Gottfredson
- Winnie Grosso
- Dick Huemer
- Lucille Ogle
- Zack Schaja
- Sherman Brothers
- Robert Stevenson
- Riley Thomson
- Bob Weis Walt Disney Imagineering
- Elmo Williams
- Ed Wynn

During the studio's 50th anniversary in 1973 special Mousecars were given to every employee who had worked at the original Disney Studio on Hyperion Street (1929-1939) in the Los Feliz section of Los Angeles, designating them members of the exclusive Hyperion Club.

== See also ==
- Disney Legends
- Duckster
