= Vacation Time (1950) =

1950 Donald Duck comic book story by Carl Barks

- Vacation Parade, July 1950
- Story code: W VP 1-01
- Story: Carl Barks
- Date: July 1950
- Hero: Donald Duck
- Pages: 33
- Layout: 4 rows per page
- Appearances: Donald Duck; Huey, Dewey and Louie
- First publication: Vacation Parade #1

"Vacation Time" is a 33-page Disney comics story written, drawn, and lettered by Carl Barks. The story was first published in Four Color Comics as Vacation Parade #1 (July 1950). The story stars Donald Duck and his nephews Huey, Dewey and Louie. The story has been reprinted many times.

== Plot ==
Tourist Donald's dream of a carefree woodland idyll is beset by difficulties and dangers. Despite his nephews' characteristic needling, an elusive (and difficult-to-photograph) buck deer, and an unskilled bully fishing near their camp, Donald doggedly perseveres in wringing enjoyment from the outdoors. But once the bully's carelessness causes a forest fire that traps the Duck family alone, Donald's woodcraft and quick thinking are needed to ensure their survival.

== Development ==
In a 1975 interview, Barks said that his characters sometimes need to be in danger to make the story dramatic: "I couldn't create suspense without having them in real danger, and real danger means the fear of death. So all of the times these ducks got in bad situations they did have that opportunity of dying, in case they got clobbered. It made it more true to life to have them up against these impossible situations in which they could lose their lives if they didn't win. And in the forest fire sequence, you bet they were in danger. It made the story memorable."

== Analysis ==
Critic Geoffrey Blum hails Barks' artwork in "Vacation Time" as "justly famous" from its opening page. Eight panels per page for visuals are standard practice in comics layout, but Barks varies the panel's sizes (they do not appear as mere uniformly-sized rectangles) and increases their number of angles to permit changes in flow, speed, and especially scope in his storytelling. This technique allows Barks to make larger compositions without the need for half-page splashes; the story's opening full-page splash panel stands out more distinctly in this way. A handful of seven-panel pages (and one of nine) serve admirably for detailed and evocative depictions of scenery, mood, and action.

Echoing a marked theme among commentators on Barks' work, John Steel Gordon reflects that, "although Walt Disney invented Donald Duck, it was Barks who gave him his modern appearance and attributes." Barks' stamp is especially notable in the Duck's personality, as is discussed at greater length at the article Donald Duck in comics. Donald evolved in Barks' hands from what Geofrey Moses describes as a "jumble of neuroses and funny quacking noises" into an "exemplar of modernist doubt and anxiety," observing that "Barks' comics were surely popular in large part because they allowed people to see their unconscious fears and insecurities laid bare and simultaneously to laugh at them, safe in the knowledge that, for all his problems, Donald would ultimately get through all right. In this sense, the character takes on heroic proportions." Vacation Time serves as an apex in this development of heroism, as Donald's efforts to save the lives of his nephews shows him shouldering responsibilities usually given to his supporting characters, casting him much against type as an audacious rescuer. The moment, like the forest fire, is appropriately brief, and encapsulated by comic impasses both before and after Donald's peak experience.

== See also ==
- List of Disney comics by Carl Barks
