= 2730 Barks =

Carbonaceous asteroid in the asteroid belt

Discovery
- Discovered by: E. Bowell
- Discovery site: Anderson Mesa Stn.
- Discovery date: 30 August 1981

Designations
- Named after: Carl Barks (American cartoonist)
- Alternative designations: 1981 QH · 1935 FQ; 1935 HC · 1963 SP; 1972 TJ_{5} · 1975 EM_{1}
- Minor planet category: main-belt · (middle)

Orbital characteristics
- Epoch 4 September 2017 (JD 2458000.5)
- Uncertainty parameter 0
- Observation arc: 62.77 yr (22,925 days)
- Aphelion: 3.0741 AU
- Perihelion: 2.3683 AU
- Semi-major axis: 2.7212 AU
- Eccentricity: 0.1297
- Orbital period (sidereal): 4.49 yr (1,640 days)
- Mean anomaly: 70.617°
- Mean motion: 0° 13^{m} 10.56^{s} / day
- Inclination: 6.4294°
- Longitude of ascending node: 4.6736°
- Argument of perihelion: 273.09°

Physical characteristics
- Dimensions: 9.87±0.82 km 14.97±0.50 km 15.830±0.120; 24.30 km (calculated)
- Synodic rotation period: 6.084±0.002 h 6.087±0.0016 h
- Geometric albedo: 0.057 (assumed); 0.162±0.020} 0.196±0.015; 0.415±0.067
- Spectral type: SMASS = C · C
- Absolute magnitude (H): 11.31±0.87 · 11.6 · 11.643±0.003 (R) · 11.7 · 11.8

2730 Barks, provisional designation 1981 QH, is a carbonaceous asteroid from the central regions of the asteroid belt, approximately 15 kilometers in diameter. It was discovered on 30 August 1981, by American astronomer Edward Bowell at Anderson Mesa Station, Arizona, United States. The asteroid was named after comic-book illustrator Carl Barks.

== Orbit and classification ==
Barks orbits the Sun in the central main-belt at a distance of 2.4–3.1 AU once every 4 years and 6 months (1,640 days). Its orbit has an eccentricity of 0.13 and an inclination of 6° with respect to the ecliptic.

It was first identified as 1935 FQ at Johannesburg Observatory in 1935. The body's observation arc begins with a precovery taken at Palomar Observatory in 1954, or 27 years prior to its official discovery observation at Anderson Mesa.

== Physical characteristics ==
In the SMASS taxonomy, Barks is characterized as a carbonaceous C-type asteroid.

=== Rotation period ===
In August 2012, a rotational lightcurve of Barks was obtained from photometric observations by astronomers at the Oakley Southern Sky Observatory (E09) in Australia. Lightcurve analysis gave a well-defined rotation period of 6.084 hours with a brightness variation of 0.26 magnitude (U=3). This concurs with observations taken at the Palomar Transient Factory in January 2011, which gave a period of 6.087 hours and an amplitude of 0.28 magnitude (U=2).

=== Diameter and albedo ===
According to the surveys carried out by the Japanese Akari satellite and NASA's Wide-field Infrared Survey Explorer with its subsequent NEOWISE mission, Barks measures between 9.87 and 15.830 kilometers in diameter and its surface has an albedo between 0.162 and 0.415.

The Collaborative Asteroid Lightcurve Link assumes a standard albedo for carbonaceous asteroids of 0.057 and calculates a diameter of 24.30 kilometers with an absolute magnitude of 11.8.

== Naming ==
This minor planet was named for American cartoonist Carl Barks (1901–2000), best known for the fictional character Scrooge McDuck he created while working at Walt Disney in the late 1940s. In many of his stories, he described space exploration and adventure. Barks touched on the idea of ”rubble pile asteroid”, the idea, however not the term!".

Peter Thomas, an assistant of Cornell University, proposed the idea of naming an asteroid after Barks. The approved naming citation was published by the Minor Planet Center on 28 January 1983 (M.P.C. 7621). A week later, Thomas informed Barks by mail about his initiative.
