= List of non-Disney comics by Carl Barks =

American illustrator and creator

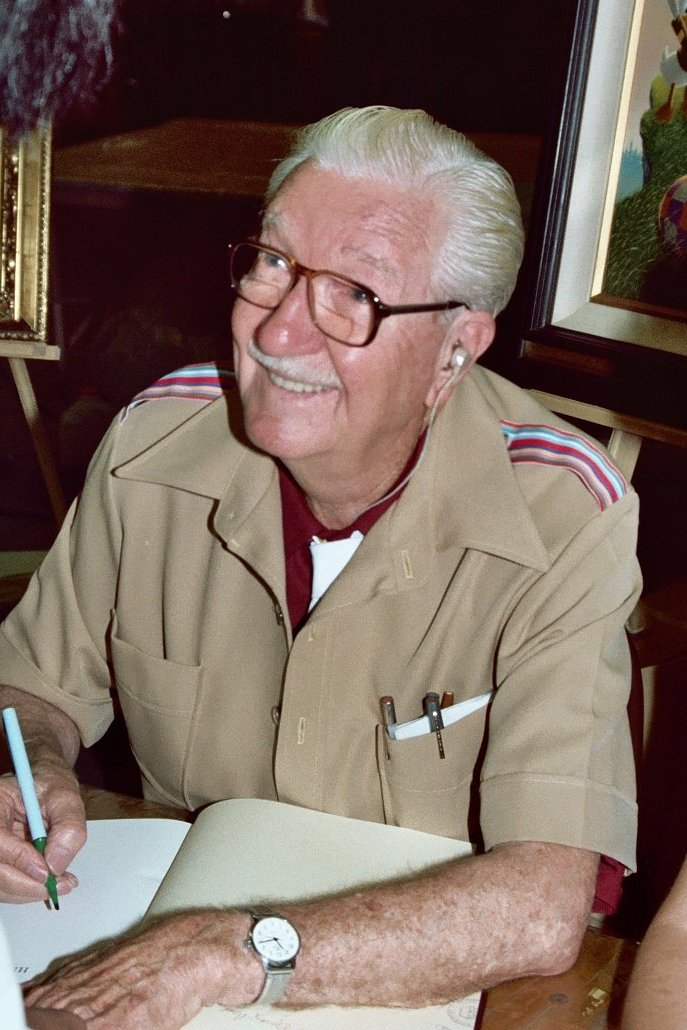
Carl Barks

Carl Barks (1901–2000) was an American illustrator and comic book creator. The quality of his scripts and drawings earned him the nicknames The Duck Man and The Good Duck Artist.

He is mainly known for his work with Disney characters. But during his time with Western Publishing he also wrote and/or drew 36 stories with characters, that didn't belong to Disney.

== List of stories ==
Only the Porky Pig story had a title in the original publication. Stories 1–7 & 9–33 have been reprinted in Barks Bear Book with the shown titles. All titles can be found on Barksbase.de. Different titles can be found on Grand Comics Database. The numbers in the reprint column are from the reprint list.

#	Original publication	Main character(s)	Other key character(s)	Title	Pages	Writer(s) / Artist(s)	Reprints
1	NF #76, Jun 1943	Andy Panda		The Widow's Doughnuts	10	E. Packer / CB & J. Pabian	4, 8, 10, 11, 12
2	OGC #8, Nov–Dec 1943	Benny Burro		With a Little Help to my Friends	8	CB	4, 10, 12
3	OGC #9, Jan–Feb 1944	Happy Hound	3B909664780	A Hard Day's Day Off	8	CB	4, 10, 12
4	OGC #9, Jan–Feb 1944	Benny Burro	Lightning	The Playful Mountain Goat	8	CB	4, 10, 12
5	OGC #10, Mar–Apr 1944	Benny Burro	El Macaw; Pablo	A Bird of Beauty is a Pest Forever	8	CB	4, 10, 12
6	OGC #11, May–Jun 1944	Barney Bear & Benny Burro	William Tell	The Sound of his Horn	8	CB	4, 6, 12
7	OGC #11, May–Jun 1944	Happy Hound	Butch; Cholmondeley; Fotheringham; Montmorency	Mother is a Wolf's Best Friend	6	CB	4, 7, 10, 12
8	FCC #48, Jul 1944	Porky Pig	Petunia Pig; Bugs Bunny; Lulu Belle Bunny; Dauntless; Ham; Kidd; Pierre; van Pooch	Porky of the Mounties	24	C. Craig / CB & Unknown	4, 5, 9, 10, 11, 12
9	OGC #12, Jul–Aug 1944	B. Bear & B. Burro		The Merry Moose Hunters	8	CB	4, 6, 12
10	OGC #13, Sep–Oct 1944	B. Bear & B. Burro	Satan; Sawbuck; Shears	Barney Rides Again	8	CB	4, 6, 12
11	OGC #14, Nov–Dec 1944	B. Bear & B. Burro		The Intrepid Wolf Trappers	8	CB	4, 6, 12
12	OGC #15, Jan–Feb 1945	B. Bear & B. Burro		How to Be a Matador	8	CB	4, 6, 12
13	OGC #16, Mar–Apr 1945	B. Bear & B. Burro	Christopher Columbia	Cougar, Cougar Shining Bright	8	CB	4, 6, 12
14	OGC #17, May–Jun 1945	B. Bear & B. Burro	Cactus Bruin; Figsniggle; Flogworthy; J.P. Foxysnozz	Cool, Clear Water	8	CB	4, 6, 12
15	OGC #18, Jul–Aug 1945	B. Bear & B. Burro		Serenade for a Senorita	6	CB	4, 6, 10, 12
16	OGC #19, Sep–Oct 1945	B. Bear & B. Burro	Weasel	Snap, Goes the Turtle	6	CB	4, 6, 12
17	OGC #20, Nov–Dec 1945	B. Bear & B. Burro	Bones; Cinnamon Bruin	The Doctor and his Patient	6	CB	4, 6, 12
18	OGC #21, Jan–Feb 1946	B. Bear & B. Burro	Rip van Winkle	To Ski or not to Ski	8	CB	4, 6, 8, 10, 12
19	OGC #22, Mar–Apr 1946	B. Bear & B. Burro	Brownie Bear; Caesar; Kodiak	Cousin Kodiak	6	CB	4, 6, 12
20	OGC #23, May–Jun 1946	B. Bear & B. Burro		The Sounds of Silence	8	CB	4, 6, 12
21	OGC #24, Jul 1946	B. Bear & B. Burro	Daniel Boone	Mother Nature's Children	8	CB	4, 6, 12
22	OGC #25, Aug 1946	B. Bear & B. Burro	William Tell	The Master of Archery	8	CB	4, 6, 12
23	OGC #26, Sep 1946	B. Bear & B. Burro	Esther Williams	The Compleat Anglers	8	CB	4, 6, 12
24	OGC #27, Oct 1946	B. Bear & B. Burro	Smittle	The Dauntless Dogcatchers	8	CB	4, 6, 12
25	OGC #28, Nov 1946	B. Bear & B. Burro		Modern Art, and all That	8	CB	4, 6, 12
26	OGC #29, Dec 1946	B. Bear & B. Burro	Oso	Somewhere under the Rainbow	8	CB	4, 6, 12
27	OGC #30, Jan 1947	B. Bear & B. Burro	McDuff; Scrooge	A Hole in None	8	CB	4, 6, 12
28	OGC #31, Feb 1947	B. Bear & B. Burro	Mooseface McElk; King Bango	Ol' McElk He Had a Farm	8	G. Turner & CB / CB	4, 6, 12
29	OGC #32, Mar 1947	B. Bear & B. Burro	Jones; Klepto Klippo	Klipto Kleppo Strikes Again	8	CB	4, 6, 12
30	OGC #33, Apr 1947	B. Bear & B. Burro	Grizzly; Spike	Uncle Grizzly	8	CB	4, 6, 12
31	OGC #34, May 1947	B. Bear & B. Burro	Mooseface McElk; I. Buildem	Home, Sweet Home no More	8	CB	4, 6, 12
32	OGC #35, Jun 1947	B. Bear & B. Burro	Mooseface McElk; Old Man Cougar	Riches, Riches in the Wall	8	CB	4, 6, 12
33	OGC #36, Jul 1947	B. Bear & B. Burro	Mooseface McElk	The Thieving Magpie	8	CB	4, 6, 12
34	T&JWC #1, Dec 1952	Droopy	Vandergilt	King of the Hounds	8	CB / H. Eisenberg	3, 10, 12
35	T&JWC #2, Dec 1953	Droopy	Valorous Derring-Do	The Hero Hound	8	CB / H. Eisenberg	2, 10, 11, 12
36	T&JSF #1, Jul 1954	Droopy	Bluebeard	The Bone	8	CB / H. Eisenberg	1, 10, 12

== Sources ==
=== Original publication ===
- NF: New Funnies #76, June 1943
- OGC: Our Gang Comics #8, Nov.-Dec. 1943 — #36, July 1947
- FCC: Four Color Comics #48, July 1944
- T&JWC: Tom & Jerry Winter Carnival #1, Dec. 1952 — #2, Dec. 1953
- T&JSF: Tom & Jerry Summer Fun #1, July 1954

=== Reprints in English ===
Reprints in chronological order:

1. Tom & Jerry Summer Fun, 1967: Gold Key
2. Golden Comics Digest #22, Mar 1972: Gold Key
3. Golden Comics Digest #41, Jan 1975: Gold Key
4. Barks Bear Book, 1979: Editions Enfin
5. Bugs Bunny and friends – A comic celebration, 1998: DC Comics, ISBN 978 1 56389 458 9
6. The Carl Barks' Big Book of Barney Bear. 2011: IDW Publishing, ISBN 978 1 60010 929 4
7. The Carl Barks Fan Club Pictorial Volume Four, 2014: CreateSpace Independent Publishing Platform, ISBN 978 1 5024 3790 7
8. The Carl Barks Fan Club Pictorial Volume Five, 2015: CreateSpace Independent Publishing Platform, ISBN 978 1 5078 9599 3
9. The Carl Barks Fan Club Pictorial Volume Six, 2015: CreateSpace Independent Publishing Platform, ISBN 978 1 5123 3674 0
10. The Unavailable Carl Barks (in color), 2016: CreateSpace Independent Publishing Platform, ISBN 978 1 5347 1814 2
11. Restoring Carl Barks, 2018: CreateSpace Independent Publishing Platform, ISBN 978 1 7171 3605 3
12. The Carl Barks Library of Burros, Hounds, Bears, Pigs, and Bunnies, 2019: CreateSpace Independent Publishing Platform, ISBN 978 1 7273 0761 0
13. Carl Barks Original Art Edition, 2023: Kim Weston Books, ISBN 979 8 3507 0485 3
14. Carl Barks Original Art Edition MGM Volume 2, 2024: Kim Weston Books, ISBN 979 8 3507 2884 2
15. Restoring Carl Barks Volume 2, 2024: Kim Weston Books, ISBN 979 8 3295 4157 1
16. Carl Barks Original Art Edition MGM Volume 3, 2025: Kim Weston Books, ISBN 979 8 3507 3556 7

=== Other sources ===
- Carl Barks and the Art of the Comic Books, 1982: M Lilien, ISBN 0-9607652-0-4
- Barks' non-Disney stories on Cbarks.dk
