= The Complete Carl Barks Disney Library =

Comic book reprints by Fantagraphics

- Cover to the first published volume, Lost in the Andes

Publication information
- Publisher: Fantagraphics Books
- Schedule: biannual
- Format: Hardcover
- Genre: Funny animals Adventure
- Publication date: December 2011
- No. of issues: about 30
- Main character(s): Donald Duck, Scrooge McDuck, Huey, Dewey, and Louie, Daisy Duck, Gyro Gearloose, Gladstone Gander, Grandma Duck

Creative team
- Created by: Carl Barks
- Written by: Carl Barks
- Artist: Carl Barks
- Colourist(s): Rich Tommaso, Tom Ziuko, Joseph Robert Cowles
- Editor: Gary Groth

The Complete Carl Barks Disney Library is an American series of books by Fantagraphics Books, collecting all of the comic book Donald Duck and Uncle Scrooge stories written and drawn by Carl Barks, originally published between 1942 and Barks' retirement in June 1966. The series was launched in late 2011, and will comprise 6,000 plus pages over roughly 30 200- to 250-page volumes when it is finished.

The Complete Carl Barks Disney Library or parts of it has been translated and published in Italy, Brazil, Russia, Germany, China, and Czechia.

From March 2024, Disney restricted access to the Kindle editions outside of North America, making the entire digital collection unavailable to purchase officially outside of North America.

== Background ==
The rights to Barks' works were licensed from Disney by Gemstone Publishing from 2003 until the end of 2008, when they ceased publishing Disney titles. When Fantagraphics Books publisher Gary Groth heard this, he contacted Disney and secured the publishing rights to Floyd Gottfredson's work on the Mickey Mouse comic strip, resulting in the Floyd Gottfredson Library series that began publication in mid-2011. Groth also tried to obtain the publishing rights to Barks' duck stories. Disney at first announced they would publish the stories themselves, but eventually changed their minds and passed the work on to Fantagraphics. In 2014, Fantagraphics also began publishing a companion series, The Don Rosa Library, collecting the Uncle Scrooge and Donald Duck stories written and drawn by Don Rosa.

== Format ==
Barks' duck stories have been reprinted extensively, especially in Europe. Before Fantagraphics there were two complete collections in English published by Another Rainbow. The first was the expensive, scholarly Carl Barks Library (1984–1990) in 30 hardcover volumes collected in ten slipcase volumes with three books in each, which was in black-and-white. The second was Carl Barks Library in Color in softcover album format with modern colouring.

Fantagraphics' 7.5 inches × 10.25 inches (19 cm × 26 cm) hardcover volumes are published in full color, as the stories originally were. When the series is complete, it will represent a chronological collection of Barks' stories. However, the volumes of the stories are being published out of order, starting with the volumes that the publishers believe will attract the most attention, starting with Lost in the Andes!, a volume containing stories from what is considered to be Barks' "peak" period (the late 1940s to the mid-1950s), including the title story "Lost in the Andes", which many fans consider to be representative of Barks' best work, and was Barks' own favorite.

The design work was done by Fantagraphics' lead designer, Jacob Covey. The pages are recolored by Rich Tommaso, using the original comics as a coloring guide, unlike some of Fantagraphics' more scholarly reprints, as the books are aimed at a more general audience than many of Fantagraphics' other offerings, which are often aimed at the comics aficionados.

The books are about 240 pages each—about 200 pages of comics, with the remaining pages made up of supplementary material, such as cover reprints and essays.

== Restoration ==
Fantagraphics chose to have the artwork computer-recolored, using the original comics as color guides, rather than reprinting with the original off-register colors as they have in many of their other archival projects. Colorist Rich Tommaso has stuck closely to the original colors, although muting the originally garish ones somewhat in a concession to modern readers. Sometimes the colors were changed when it was known that Barks hadn't liked them, or when it was felt they could be corrected or improved. Some stories are printed from recently rediscovered original artwork.

=== Censorship ===
Volumes 5-20 were completely uncensored, including the racial caricatures that appeared in the originals that had been retouched in later printings. Starting from Volume 21, some stories were edited or removed:

- Volume 21 - altered dialogue / removed content.
  - The first printing includes the statement: "Some dialogue in this edition has been updated."
  - In the story "The Lovelorn Fireman" at page 108, the word "holocaust" was replaced with "conflagration".
  - The story "The Flying Farm Hand" has been removed from the second printing.
  - Note: In the second printing (released late 2022, but dated January 2023), the disclaimer regarding altered dialogue is removed, and the original text is restored.
- Volume 23 - altered dialogue
  - The table of contents includes the statement: "The artwork in these comics stories is reproduced here in its entirety as first created in 1959-1960."
  - The story "Trail Tycoon", has altered dialogues regarding Native Americans.
  - The story "The Wax Museum", has altered dialogues regarding Native Americans.
  - Note: The second printing restores all the original dialogue.
- Volume 26 - Altered dialogue / altered content.
  - The story "Bongo on the Congo" retains edits made by the publisher Gladstone from the 1980s, this includes altered panels and dialogue. The edits are also present in the second printing.
- Volume 28 - Missing content.
  - The cover for Uncle Scrooge #39
  - The one-page story "Million Dollar Shower".
  - Note: Both are mentioned in "Where did these Duck stories first appear? on page 196, while nowhere to be found in the actual book.
- Volume 4 - Missing content.
  - In "The Bill Collectors", the entire original page 3 is removed.
  - In "Swimming Swindlers" a cigarette in a kid's mouth has been deleted from multiple panels.
- Volume 3 - Altered dialogue / removed content.
  - The story "Silent Night" has been omitted without explanation.
  - Dialogues in "The Icebox Robber" are published in an old censored version.
- Volume 2 - Altered dialogue.
  - The story "Frozen Gold" has some altered dialogue.
- Volume 1 - Missing content / altered art.
  - The story "Good Deeds" has been omitted without explanation.
  - In "The Mummy's ring" the dark makeup has been removed from the faces of the ducks in the last panel on page 18.

== Recognition ==
- 2013 – The volume Uncle Scrooge: Only a Poor Old Man was nominated for the Eisner Award in the category, "Best Archival Collection/Project – Comic Books".
- 2015 – The volume Donald Duck: Trail of the Unicorn was nominated for the Eisner Award in the category, "Best Archival Collection/Project – Comic Books (at least 20 years old)".
- 2022 – The volume Uncle Scrooge: Island in the Sky was nominated for the Eisner Award in the category, "Best Archival Collection/Project – Comic Books (at least 20 Years Old)".

== Volumes and boxed sets ==
Volumes
Vol.	Release order & date	Title figure	Title	Period	Page count	ISBN	Inducks link
1	28: 2025-08-26	Donald Duck	"Donald Duck Finds Pirate Gold"	1938–1943	242	979-8-8750-0113-0	CBDL 1
2	27: 2024-11-12	Donald Duck	“Frozen Gold”	1943–1945	238	978-1-68396-988-4	CBDL 2
3	26: 2024-08-20	Donald Duck	“Mystery of the Swamp”	1945–1946	238	978-1-68396-972-3	CBDL 3
4	25: 2023-10-10	Donald Duck	“Maharajah Donald”	1946–1947	224	978-1-68396-900-6	CBDL 4
5	5: 2013-11-10	Donald Duck	“Christmas on Bear Mountain”	1947	210	978-1-60699-697-3	CBDL 5
6	4: 2013-05-16	Donald Duck	“The Old Castle's Secret”	1948	226	978-1-60699-653-9	CBDL 6
7	1: 2011-12-05	Donald Duck	“Lost in the Andes”	1948–1949	250	978-1-60699-474-0	CBDL 7
8	6: 2014-05-02	Donald Duck	“Trail of the Unicorn”	1949–1950	224	978-1-60699-741-3	CBDL 8
9	8: 2015-05-15	Donald Duck	“The Pixilated Parrot”	1950	210	978-1-60699-834-2	CBDL 9
10	10: 2016-05-07	Donald Duck	“Terror of the Beagle Boys”	1951	225	978-1-60699-920-2	CBDL 10
11	3: 2012-11-07	Donald Duck	“A Christmas For Shacktown”	1951–1952	234	978-1-60699-574-7	CBDL 11
12	2: 2012-07-17	Uncle Scrooge	“Only a Poor Old Man”	1952–1954	240	978-1-60699-535-8	CBDL 12
13	9: 2015-10-26	Donald Duck	“Trick or Treat”	1952–1953	236	978-1-60699-874-8	CBDL 13
14	7: 2014-11-05	Uncle Scrooge	“The Seven Cities of Gold”	1954–1955	244	978-1-60699-795-6	CBDL 14
15	11: 2016-09-13	Donald Duck	“The Ghost Sheriff of Last Gasp”	1953–1955	242	978-1-60699-953-0	CBDL 15
16	12: 2017-08-15	Uncle Scrooge	“The Lost Crown of Genghis Khan”	1956–1957	232	978-1-68396-013-3	CBDL 16
17	13: 2017-09-19	Donald Duck	“Secret of Hondorica”	1955–1956	200	978-1-68396-045-4	CBDL 17
18	14: 2018-03-27	Donald Duck	“The Lost Peg Leg Mine”	1956–1958	192	978-1-68396-093-5	CBDL 18
19	15: 2018-09-05	Donald Duck	“The Black Pearls of Tabu Yama”	1957–1958	200	978-1-68396-123-9	CBDL 19
20	16: 2019-05-21	Uncle Scrooge	“The Mines of King Solomon”	1957–1958	200	978-1-68396-187-1	CBDL 20
21	17: 2019-10-08	Donald Duck	“Christmas in Duckburg”	1958–1959	200	978-1-68396-239-7	CBDL 21
22	18: 2020-06-09	Uncle Scrooge	“The Twenty-Four Carat Moon”	1958–1962	200	978-1-68396-291-5	CBDL 22
23	19: 2020-11-10	Donald Duck	“Under the Polar Ice”	1959–1960	200	978-1-68396-383-7	CBDL 23
24	20: 2021-03-16	Uncle Scrooge	"Island in the Sky"	1959–1960, 1990∗	210	978-1-68396-401-8	CBDL 24
25	21: 2021-11-16	Donald Duck	"Balloonatics"	1960–1961, 1969–1970∗∗	210	978-1-68396-474-2	CBDL 25
26	22: 2022-05-17	Uncle Scrooge	"The Golden Nugget Boat"	1960–1962	208	978-1-68396-565-7	CBDL 26
27	23: 2022-09-27	Donald Duck	"Duck Luck"	1960-1961, 1971**	202	978-1-68396-653-1	CBDL 27
28	24: 2023-06-20	Uncle Scrooge	"Cave of Ali Baba"	1960-1962, 2006*	208	978-1-68396-763-7	CBDL 28
29	29: 2025-10-14	Donald Duck	"The Lonely Lighthouse on Cape Quack"	1961-1966	220	979-8-8750-0150-5	CBDL 29
30	30: 2026-06-30	Uncle Scrooge	"Lost Beneath the Sea"	1963-1964	240	979-8-8750-0181-9	CBDL 30
31	31: 2026-11-10	Donald Duck	"Christmas Cheers"		224	979-8-8750-0255-7	CBDL 31
32	32: 2027-06	Uncle Scrooge	"The Billion Dollar Safari"			979-8-8750-0411-7	CBDL 32

∗ The Pied Piper of Duckburg: pages 1–3 script and pencils by Carl Barks in 1959; pages 4–8 script and finished art by Don Rosa in 1990, respectively Daan Jippes in 2006.
∗∗ Only scripts done by Barks; for Junior Woodchucks stories, art by Daan Jippes.

=== Box sets ===
Boxed sets
Release order & date	Title figure	Title	Vol.	ISBN
1: 2013-11-10	Donald Duck	"Christmas Treasury Gift Box Set"	5 & 11	978-1-60699-714-7
2: 2014-10-18	Donald Duck	"Lost In The Andes" & "Trail Of The Unicorn"	7 & 8	978-1-60699-796-3
3: 2015-11-23	Uncle Scrooge	"Only A Poor Old Man" & "The Seven Cities Of Gold"	12 & 14	978-1-60699-875-5
4: 2016-09-13	Donald Duck	"Christmas On Bear Mountain" & "The Old Castle's Secret"	5 & 6	978-1-60699-979-0
5: 2017-09-19	Donald Duck	"The Pixilated Parrot" & "Terror of The Beagle Boys"	9 & 10	978-1-68396-046-1
6: 2018-09-25	Donald Duck	"A Christmas for Shacktown" & "Trick or Treat"	11 & 13	978-1-68396-124-6
7: 2019-10-15	Donald Duck	"The Ghost Sheriff of Last Gasp" & "Secret of Hondorica"	15 & 17	978-1-68396-240-3
8: 2020-10-20	Donald Duck	"The Lost Peg Leg Mine" & "The Black Pearls of Tabu Yama"	18 & 19	978-1-68396-384-4
9: 2021-12-07	Uncle Scrooge	"The Lost Crown of Genghis Khan" & "The Mines of King Solomon"	16 & 20	978-1-68396-475-9
10: 2022-10-25	Donald Duck	"Christmas in Duckburg" & "Under the Polar Ice"	21 & 23	978-1-68396-662-3
11: 2023-10-10	Uncle Scrooge	"The Twenty-four Carat Moon" & "Island in the Sky"	22 & 24	978-1-68396-898-6
12: 2024-10-15	Donald Duck	"Balloonatics" & "Duck Luck"	25 & 27	978-1-68396-987-7
13: 2025-10-14	Uncle Scrooge	"The Golden Nugget Boat" & "Cave of Ali Baba"	26 & 28	979-8-8750-0149-9
14: 2026-10-27	Donald Duck	"Mystery of the Swamp" & "Maharajah Donald"	3 & 4	979-8-8750-0283-0

=== Softcovers ===
Fantagraphics has also published three paperback titles containing selected stories from the hardcover line. In comparison to the full size hardcover series which features stories in Barks' typical four-row format, the paperback line present the material in a two-row format at a page size of 7.3 × 5.5 inches.

- Donald Duck: Ghost of the Grotto, 130 pages, 2014-10-04, 978-1-60699-779-6
- Donald Duck: Sheriff of Bullet Valley, 98 pages, 2015-04-10, 978-1-60699-820-5
- Donald Duck: The Golden Helmet, 130 pages, 2015-10-03, 978-1-60699-852-6
- Donald Duck Adventures Mini Collection, box with the 3 books, 2024-09-24, 978-1-68396-467-4

== Related ==
Free Comic Book Day 2012

In 2011 it was announced that Fantagrapics would participate in the Free Comic Book Day promotion campaign in May, 2012. For this occasion they would release a comic book titled, Walt Disney's Donald Duck Family Comics, an issue featuring reprinted duck stories by Carl Barks. The issue contained the three stories: The Round Money Bin, Donald Duck's Worst Nightmare and Somethin' Fishy Here, as well as eight one-page gag comics.

== Foreign versions ==
=== Brazilian version ===
The Brazilian version is titled Coleção Carl Barks Definitiva and was initially published by Editora Abril from 2016 to 2018, when the publisher ended its contract with Disney. In November 2019, Panini Comics resumed the collection.

Volumes
Vol.	Released	Title figure	Title	Period	Page count	Publisher	ISBN	Inducks link
1	2026-06	Donald Duck	“O Tesouro do Pirata”	1938–1943	248	Panini	978-65 259 477 92	CCBD 1
2	2025-06	Donald Duck	“Tempo Quente no Alasca”	1943–1945	238	Panini	978 65 259 3672 7	CCBD 2
3	2025-12	Donald Duck	“O Mistério do Pântano”	1945–1946	248	Panini	978 65 259 4432 6	CCBD 3
4	2024-01	Donald Duck	“O Tigres Reais”	1946–1947	224	Panini	978 65 2592 196 9	CCBD 4
5	2016-11	Donald Duck	“Natal nas Montanhas”	1947	220	Editora Abril	978 85 5579 243 4	CCBD 5
6	2016-10	Donald Duck	“O Segredo do Castelo”	1948	244	Editora Abril	978 85 5579 098 0	CCBD 6
7	2016-08	Donald Duck	“Perdidos nos Andes!”	1948–1949	244	Editora Abril	978 85 5579 065 2	CCBD 7
8	2016-12	Donald Duck	“Em Busca do Unicórnio”	1949–1950	244	Editora Abril	978 85 5579 111 6	CCBD 8
9	2017-04	Donald Duck	“O Papagaio Contador”	1950	220	Editora Abril	978 85 5579 172 7	CCBD 9
10	2017-07	Donald Duck	“O Vil Metal e os Vilões”	1951	236	Editora Abril	978 85 5579 203 8	CCBD 10
11	2020-01	Donald Duck	“O Trenzinho da Alegria”	1951-1952	200	Panini	978 85 426 2394 9	CCBD 11
12	2020-02	Uncle Scrooge	“Nadando em Dinheiro”	1952-1954	200	Panini	978 85 426 2698 8	CCBD 12
13	2017-09	Donald Duck	“A Noite das Bruxas”	1952–1953	228	Editora Abril	978 85 5579 225 0	CCBD 13
14	2020-06	Uncle Scrooge	“As Cidades do Ouro”	1954-1955	200	Panini	978 65 5512 083 7	CCBD 14
15	2017-02-24	Donald Duck	“A Cidade Fantasma”	1953–1955	252	Editora Abril	978 85 5579 139 0	CCBD 15
16	2019-11	Uncle Scrooge	“A Coroa Perdida de Genghis Khan”	1956-1957	200	Panini	978 85 426 1711 5	CCBD 16
17	2018-01	Donald Duck	“O Segredo de Hondorica”	1955-1956	200	Editora Abril	978 85 5579 258 8	CCBD 17
18	2018-03	Donald Duck	“A Mina Perdida do Perneta”	1956-1957	200	Editora Abril	978 85 69522 53 9	CCBD 18
19	2020-10	Donald Duck	“O Tabu das Pérolas Negras”	1957–1958	200	Panini	978 65 55123 15 9	CCBD 19
20	2020-09	Uncle Scrooge	“As Minas do Rei Salomão”	1957–1958	200	Panini	978 65 55124 42 2	CCBD 20
21	2020-12	Donald Duck	“Natal em Patópolis”	1958–1959	200	Panini	978 65 55125 52 8	CCBD 21
22	2021-03	Uncle Scrooge	“A Lua de Vinte e Quatro Quilates”	1958-1962	200	Panini	978 65 55126 99 0	CCBD 22
23	2021-05	Donald Duck	“Sob o Gelo Polar”	1959-1960	200	Panini	978 65 59600 41 0	CCBD 23
24	2021-07	Uncle Scrooge	“A Ilha no Espaço”	1959-1960	216	Panini	978 65 59821 73 0	CCBD 24
25	2022-02	Donald Duck	“Folias Aéreas”	1960-1961, 1969-1970	208	Panini	978 65 59605 21 7	CCBD 25
26	2024-04	Uncle Scrooge	“O Navio de Ouro”	1960–1962	216	Panini	978 65 25918 60 0	CBDL 26
27	2024-08	Donald Duck	“Um Pato Sem Sorte”	1960-1961, 1971	202	Panini	978 65 25915 44 9	CBDL 27
28	2025-03	Uncle Scrooge	“O Tesouro de Ali Babá”	1960-1962, 2006*	208	Panini	978 65 25927 66 4	CCBD 28
29	2026-10	Donald Duck	“O Farol do Cabo Quac”	1961-1966, 2006*	216	Panini	978-65 62527 69 8	CCBD 29

=== German version ===
The German version is titled Onkel Dagobert und Donald Duck von Carl Barks and started November 2022. It was published by Egmont Comic Collection. As of 2024, only the first two volumes were published.

Onkel Dagobert & Donald Duck von Carl Barks Volumes
US Vol.	Release order & date	Title	Period	ISBN	Boxed set ISBN
5	1: 2022-11-10	“Die Mutprobe”	1947	978-3-7704-0446-9	978-3-7704-0487-2
6	2: 2023-01-18	“Das Gespenst von Duckenburgh”	1948	978-3-7704-0447-6	978-3-7704-0487-2
7	3: 2023-10-10	“Im Land der viereckigen Eier”	1948–1949	978-3-7704-0499-5	978-3-7704-0503-9
8	4: 2024-01-16	“Die Jagd auf das Einhorn”	1949–1950	978-3-7704-0502-2	978-3-7704-0503-9
9	5: 2024-12	“Familie Duck auf Ferienfahrt”	1950	978-3-7704-0627-2	978-3-7704-0638-8
10	6: 2024-12	“Gefährliches Spiel”	1951	978-3-7704-0637-1	978-3-7704-0638-8

=== Italian version ===
Two volumes were published by Rizzoli Lizard in 2012-2013 before being canceled after the second volume. In November 2019, Panini Comics resumed the collection publishing "Le Storie di Natale di Barks", a box set that is the translation of the first Fantagraphics box set with volumes 5 and 11. In November 2022 Panini continued with volume 6.

Volumes
Vol.	Release order & date	Title figure	Title	Period	Page count	ISBN	Inducks link
5	3: 2019-11	Donald Duck	“Il Natale di Paperino sul Monte Orso”	1947	224	978-88-287-0875-9	DCLA 2B
6	5: 2022-11	Donald Duck	“Paperino e il segreto del vecchio castello”			978-88-287-0884-1	
7	1: 2012-11	Donald Duck	“Il mistero degli Incas”	1948–1949	240	978-88-17-06065-3	CBRL 1
11	4: 2019-11	Donald Duck	“Paperino e il decino fatale”	1951-1952	248	978-88-287-0876-6	DCLA 2C
12	2: 2013-6	Uncle Scrooge	“La disfida dei dollari”	1952–1954	240	978-88-17-06684-6	CBRL 2

==== Box sets ====
Boxed sets
Vol.	Release order & date	Title figure	Title	Volumes	ISBN
N/A	1: 2019-11	Donald Duck	"Le storie di Natale"	5 & 11	978-88-912-8094-7

=== Russian version ===
The Russian version is titled Библиотека Карла Баркса and is published by АСТ since 2017.

Volumes
Vol.	Release order & date	Title figure	Title	Period	Page count	ISBN	Inducks link
12	1: 2017-04-03	Uncle Scrooge	“Всего лишь бедный старичок”	1952–1954	248	978-5-17-101749-1	CBDL 12
5	2: 2017-11-01	Donald Duck	“Рождество на Медвежьей горе”	1947	216	978-5-17-102848-0	CBDL 5
14	3: 2017-12-07	Uncle Scrooge	“Семь золотых городов”	1954–1955	240	978-5-17-102847-3	CBDL 14
6	4: 2018-03-26	Donald Duck	“Тайна старого замка”	1948	232	978-5-17-106038-1	CBDL 6
7	5: 2018-08-15	Donald Duck	"Затерянные в Андах"	1948-1949	240	978-5-17-107862-1	CBDL 7
8	6: 2018-12-04	Donald Duck	"След единорога"	1949-1950	224	978-5-17-107861-4	CBDL 8
9	7: 2019-02	Donald Duck	"Ужасные Братья Гавс"			978-5-17-110924-0	CBDL 9
11	8: 2019	Donald Duck	"Рождество в Беднотауне"			978-5-17-112211-9	CBDL 11
16	9: 2019	Uncle Scrooge	"Пропавшая корона Чингисхана"			978-5-17-115067-9	CBDL 16
13	10: 2019	Donald Duck	"Шутка или угощение"			978-5-17-117585-6	CBDL 13
20	11: 2020	Uncle Scrooge	"Копи царя Соломона"			978-5-17-117611-2	CBDL 20
15	12: 2020	Donald Duck	"Призрачный шериф"			978-5-17-120383-2	CBDL 15
10	13: 2020	Donald Duck	"Безумный попугай"			978-5-17-121138-7	CBDL 10

== See also ==
- List of Disney comics by Carl Barks
- The Carl Barks Collection
- The Carl Barks Library
- The Carl Barks Library in Color
- The Don Rosa Library
- Walt Disney's Mickey Mouse (The Floyd Gottfredson Library)
