= Cabañas de Sayago =

Coordinates: 41°20′N 5°47′W

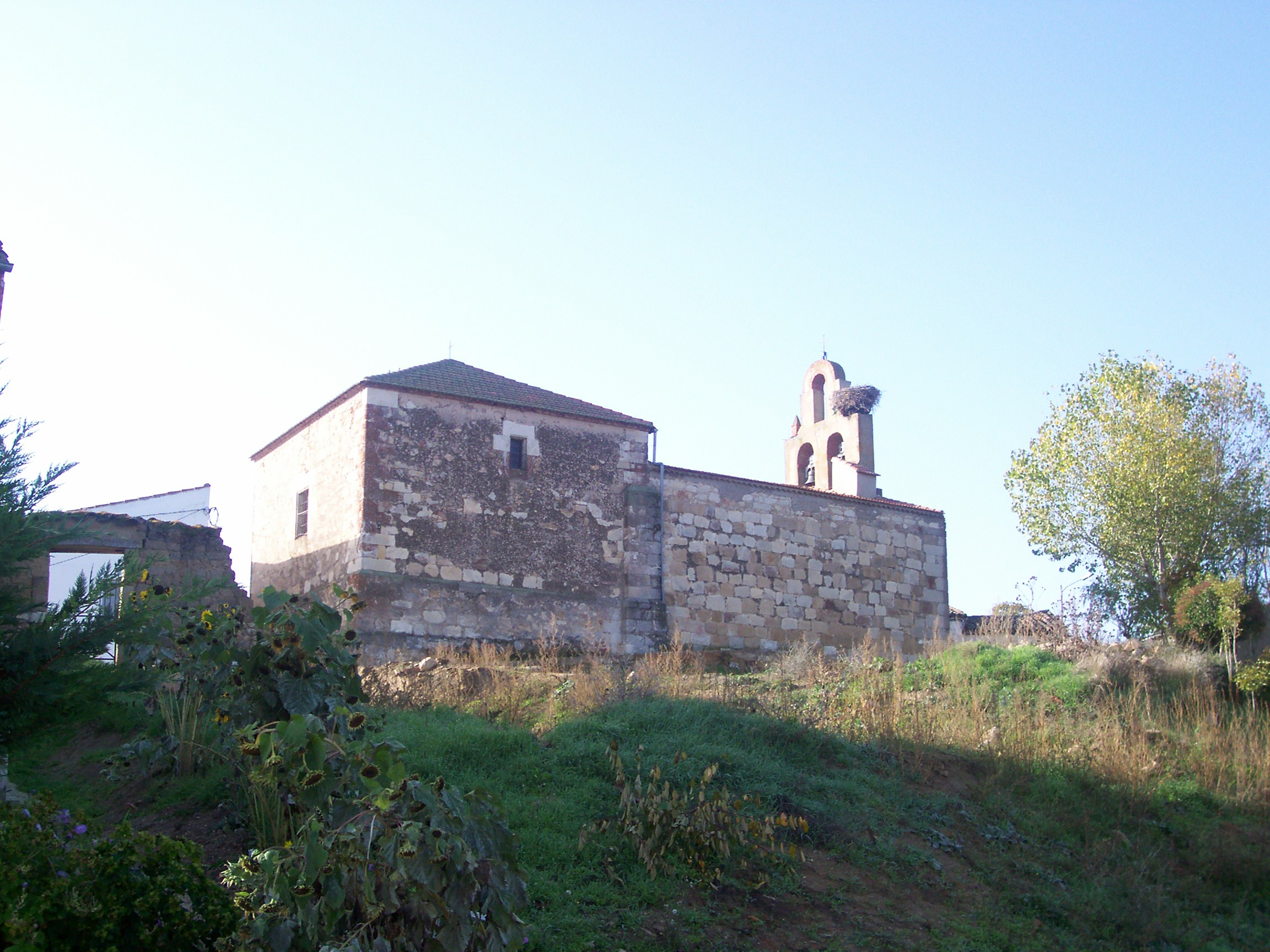

- Flag Coat of arms
- Interactive map of Cabañas de Sayago
- Country: Spain
- Autonomous community: Castile and León
- Province: Zamora
- Municipality: Cabañas de Sayago

Area
  - Total: 49 km^{2} (19 sq mi)

Population (2025-01-01)
  - Total: 143
  - Density: 2.9/km^{2} (7.6/sq mi)
- Time zone: UTC+1 (CET)
  - Summer (DST): UTC+2 (CEST)

Cabañas de Sayago is a municipality located in the province of Zamora, Castile and León, Spain. According to the 2009 census (INE), the municipality has a population of 187 inhabitants.
