= The Carl Barks Library in Color =

Disney comics reprint collection

The Carl Barks Library in Color is a series of 141 Disney comics albums reprinting most of the Duck comics written and/or drawn by Carl Barks. The set was published by Gladstone Comics from 1992 to 1998.

The series is a full-color reprinting of The Carl Barks Library, a black-and-white collection published by Another Rainbow Publishing from 1983 to 1990. Each album also contains a two to six page essay on an aspect of Barks' life and work, a literary analysis of the stories in that album, or other related historical material.

Some stories with Grandma Duck, Daisy Duck, and Junior Woodchucks are not included in the series. However, they are included in the similar German series, Die Barks Library.

The series is divided in 6 subseries:

- Walt Disney's Comics and Stories (Jan 1992-March 1996, 51 issues)
- Uncle Scrooge One Pagers (Aug 1992, 2 issues)
- 1940s Donald Duck Christmas Giveaways (Dec 1992, 1 issue)
- Gyro Gearloose Comics and Fillers (Jan 1993-June 1993, 6 issues)
- Donald Duck Adventures (Jan 1994-Jan 1996, 25 issues)
- Uncle Scrooge Adventures (Feb 1996-Dec 1998, 56 issues)

== See also ==
- The Carl Barks Library (published 1983–1990)
- The Complete Carl Barks Disney Library (2011-present)
