= The Carl Barks Library =

Comic book reprint series

Publication information
- Publisher: Another Rainbow
- Genre: Funny animals
- Publication date: 1983 – 1990
- No. of issues: 10 sets of 3 volumes each
- Main character(s): Scrooge McDuck, Donald Duck, Huey, Dewey, and Louie, Gyro Gearloose, Gladstone Gander

Creative team
- Written by: Carl Barks
- Artist: Carl Barks
- Inker: Carl Barks

The Carl Barks Library (CBL) is a series of 30 large hardcover books reprinting all of the Disney comics stories and covers written and/or drawn by Carl Barks. Stories that were modified in the original publication, sometimes for production reasons and sometimes due to excessive editing, were restored in CBL to Barks' original intent. The books are collected in ten slipcase volumes with three books in each, a total of about 7,400 pages. The volumes were published from 1983 to 1990 in the United States by Another Rainbow Publishing under license from The Walt Disney Company. The comics were printed (with a few exceptions) in black and white. In addition to the comics, there are numerous articles with background information.

== Volume sets ==
| Set | Publication Date | Contents | Story Date |
|---|---|---|---|
| I | July 1984 | Four Color Donald Duck 9–223 | October 1942 – April 1949 |
| II | November 1986 | Four Color Donald Duck 238–422 and Donald Duck 26–138 | August 1949 – July 1971 |
| III | December 1984 | Four Color Uncle Scrooge 386–495 and Uncle Scrooge 3–20 | March 1952 – February 1958 |
| IV | November 1985 | Uncle Scrooge 21–43 and The Lemonade Fling | March 1958 – July 1963 |
| V | April 1989 | Uncle Scrooge 44–71 and The Christmas Carol | August 1963 – October 1967 |
| VI | May 1990 | Giveaways, Annuals and Miscellaneous Issues | 1947 – May 1961 |
| VII | March 1988 | Walt Disney's Comics and Stories 31–94 and Large Feature Comics #7 | April 1943 – July 1948 |
| VIII | August 1983 | Walt Disney's Comics and Stories 95–166 | August 1948 – July 1954 |
| IX | June 1985 | Walt Disney's Comics and Stories 167–229 | August 1954 – October 1959 |
| X | August 1990 | Walt Disney's Comics and Stories 230–312 and an Index | November 1959 – September 1966 |

== Reprintings ==
Gladstone Publishing (a subsidiary of Another Rainbow) published a full-color version, The Carl Barks Library in Color, in a series of 141 comic book albums between 1992 and 1998.

Fantagraphics Books is currently collecting all of Barks' work as a hardcover collection, The Complete Carl Barks Disney Library.

== See also ==
- The Carl Barks Collection
- List of Disney comics by Carl Barks
