= Leanin' Tree Museum of Western Art =

- Established: 1974
- Location: 6055 Longbow Dr; Boulder, Colorado (United States)
- Coordinates: 40.0650°N 105.2133°W
- Type: Art museum
- Website: www.LeaninTreeMuseum.com

The Leanin' Tree Museum of Western Art was a private art museum located in Boulder, Colorado. It exhibited the private art collection of Ed Trumble, founder and chairman of Leanin' Tree, Incorporated. Trumble is a publisher of fine art greeting cards since 1949. The collection also included American western art spanning five decades. The museum closed forever on August 31, 2017. The gift shop, which had been part of the museum, remained open until 2024, when Leanin' Tree's production facilities moved northeast to the town of Mead, Colorado.

== Background ==
The first cowboy Christmas card was created by the famous Montana artist, Charles M. Russell, one hundred years ago. Fifty years later, Robert R. Lorenz, a student at Colorado A&M University, began to sell his own cowboy Christmas designs at the local bookstores in Fort Collins, Colorado, delivering a few boxes at a time on his bicycle.

In 1949, Trumble met Lorenz and the two young war veterans enjoyed an instant friendship. Trumble, an employee of Western Live Stock magazine in Denver, had been reared on a cattle-feeding farm in Nebraska and shared Lorenz's consuming interest in the cowboy West. With a handshake, they formed a partnership that was to last fifteen years and called it "The Lazy RL Ranch." Lorenze designed four Christmas cards and Trumble marketed them through a small mail-order ad in the magazine's October issue, immediately resulting in surprising sums of cash orders.

Over the years, while traveling about the West in search of new paintings to publish, Trumble became acquainted with virtually every western artists of the day and developed a passionate interest in collecting their work. His partner Lorenz died in 1965, his lifetime dream of having his real Wyoming ranch unfulfilled. Trumble continued on with his own greeting card enterprise, renaming it "Leanin' Tree," and the company embarked on a long period of growth. All the while the young entrepreneur was building and refining an impressive collection of post-1950 fine art of the American West.

In 1974, Trumble opened a small public art exhibit area as part of a new company plant. Twenty-five years later, the Leanin' Tree Museum had expanded to display 250 major paintings and 150 important bronze sculptures.
