= Another Rainbow Publishing =

American Disney comics publisher

Another Rainbow Publishing is a company dedicated to the re-publication and greater recognition of the work of Carl Barks that was created in 1981 by Bruce Hamilton and Russ Cochran.

Its subsidiary division, Gladstone Publishing was founded in 1985 to handle non-Barks Disney comics. Several times throughout the 1980s and 1990s, Gladstone became the major publisher of Disney comics in the United States.

Having finished the thirty-volume Carl Barks Library, Another Rainbow Publishing is no longer an active publisher, although they still sell previously published works.

== Name ==
Its name references Barks's saying that there would be "always another rainbow" for his character Scrooge McDuck, which also became the title of one of Barks's oil paintings of the richest duck in the world.

== Publications ==
In 1983 Another Rainbow began to publish the entire Disney comic book works of Barks—over 500 stories in all—in the ten-set, thirty-volume Carl Barks Library. These oversized hardbound volumes reproduced Barks' pages in pristine black and white line art, as close as possible to the way he had originally drawn them, and included many special features, articles, reminiscences, interviews, storyboards, and critiques. This project was completed in mid-1990. Another Rainbow subsidiary Gladstone publishing completed the re-publication of Barks's entire work, this time in color, from 1992 to 1998.

Another Rainbow Publishing also produced and issued the award-winning book The Fine Art of Walt Disney's Donald Duck by Carl Barks, a comprehensive collection of the Disney duck paintings of this artist and storyteller. Not long after, the company began producing fine art lithographs of many of these paintings, in strictly limited editions, all signed by Barks, who eventually produced many original works for the series.

== Disney figurines ==
Having established itself as a publisher of specialty books and lithographs based on the works of Carl Barks, Another Rainbow launched an ambitious project of creating limited edition bone-china figurines based on Barks Disney characters - especially Scrooge McDuck and Donald Duck. Connoisseur of Malvern (UK), which also produced figurines for Buckingham Palace and the Whitehouse, manufactured 7 of these figurines (Under Carl Barks direction) which ranged in price from $1980 to $19,500. The earlier releases sold out rapidly - although, there were a number of later editions unsold by the time Another Rainbow's license with Disney expired.

In 2001, all of these figurines were destroyed due to a licensing disagreement with the new management at the Walt Disney Company.

== Gladstone Publishing ==
In 1985 a new division was founded, "Gladstone Publishing", which took up the then-dormant Disney comic book license. Gladstone published Disney comic books by Barks, Paul Murry, and Floyd Gottfredson, and also presented the first works of modern Disney comics masters Don Rosa and William Van Horn. Gladstone's books were also among the first in the United States to regularly include Disney comics produced in Europe. The company was based in Scottsdale, Arizona, but moved in 1987 to Prescott, Arizona.

== Death of Bruce Hamilton ==
Bruce Hamilton, co-founder, and driving force behind Another Rainbow Publishing, died on June 20, 2005, after a long illness.

== See also ==
- Gladstone Publishing
- Carl Barks
- Carl Barks Library
- Little Lulu Library
- Lithography
