= Walt Disney's Treasury of Classic Tales (hardcover book collection) =

Publication information
- Publisher: The Library of American Comics
- Format: Hardcover
- Genre: Funny animals Adventure; Fairy tale Adaptation
- Publication date: November 2016
- No. of issues: 3 published of 4 planned
- Main character(s): various

Creative team
- Written by: Frank A. Reilly, Floyd Gottfredson
- Penciller(s): Manuel Gonzales, Jesse Marsh, Julius Svendsen, Floyd Gottfredson, Ken Hultgren, Joseph H. Hale, John Ushler, Bill Wright
- Inker(s): Dick Moores
- Editor(s): Dean Mullaney

Walt Disney's Treasury of Classic Tales is a series of hardcover books that collects the Sunday comic strips of Walt Disney's Treasury of Classic Tales, an umbrella title for comic strips which were drawn by several different Disney artists during the period of the early 1950s to the mid-1980s. The Treasury of Classic Tales comic strips were used by Walt Disney Studios to introduce current movie characters into comic adaptations for the public. The books are being published by IDW Publishing's imprint, The Library of American Comics. The first book of the series was released in November 2016.

In April 2018, it was announced that, due to the sales goal of the series not being met, the third volume may be the last one to be published.

== Format ==
The hardcover books have a sewn binding, a sewn linen ribbon bookmark, and a dust jacket. They measure 12 × 8.5 inches or 305 × 216 mm.

They are printed in full colour, as were the original comic strip publications. Each volume of the series has approximately 230 pages, some of which contain supplementary materials. Every book has an introduction written by the animation historian Michael Barrier. Background information on each featured comic story is consistently presented before each comic strip. All are prefaced with an introduction which includes comparisons between the movie and comic strip adaptation, trivia about the movie, and Walt Disney's motivation and biographical touchstones.

Volumes in the series are sold separately. The release schedule for the series is one volume per year.

== Volumes ==
Volumes
Vol.	Release date	Title	Period	Movie adaptations	Page count	ISBN	Inducks link
1	2016-11-15	Walt Disney's Treasury of Classic Tales Vol. 1	1950-1955	Cinderella, Alice in Wonderland, The Story of Robin Hood, Peter Pan, The Sword and the Rose, Ben and Me, Rob Roy, the Highland Rogue, Peter and the Wolf, 20,000 Leagues Under the Sea, Lady and the Tramp	228	978-1-63140-718-5	TCT 1
2	2017-09-05	Walt Disney's Treasury of Classic Tales Vol. 2	1955-1959	The Legends of Davy Crockett, The Littlest Outlaw, The Great Locomotive Chase, Lambert the Sheepish Lion, Westward Ho the Wagons!, Gus and Jaq, Johnny Tremain, Perri, Old Yeller, The Seven Dwarfs and The Witch-Queen, The Light in the Forest, Sleeping Beauty, The Shaggy Dog	238	978-1-63140-908-0	TCT 2
3	2018-06-05	Walt Disney's Treasury of Classic Tales Vol. 3	1959-1962	Darby O'Gill and the Little People, Third Man on the Mountain, Toby Tyler, Kidnapped, Pollyanna, Swiss Family Robinson, 101 Dalmatians, Nikki, Wild Dog of the North, The Parent Trap, Babes in Toyland, Moon Pilot, Bon Voyage!, Big Red, In Search of the Castaways	220	978-1-68405-189-2	TCT 3
4	Canceled	Walt Disney's Treasury of Classic Tales Vol. 4	1963-1966	Son of Flubber, Savage Sam, The Sword in the Stone, A Tiger Walks, The Three Lives of Thomasina, The Moon-Spinners, Mary Poppins, Those Calloways, The Monkey's Uncle, Dumbo, That Darn Cat!, Winnie the Pooh and the Honey Tree, Lt. Robin Crusoe, U.S.N., The Fighting Prince of Donegal	TBA	TBA	TCT 4

== See also ==
- Walt Disney's Treasury of Classic Tales

Other Walt Disney comic strip collections

- Walt Disney's Mickey Mouse
- Silly Symphonies: The Complete Disney Classics
- Donald Duck: The Complete Daily Newspaper Comics
- Donald Duck: The Complete Sunday Comics
