= Walt Disney's Silly Symphonies =

2023 series of books

Publication information
- Publisher: Fantagraphics Books
- Format: Hardcover
- Genre: Funny animals Adventure; Humour; Adaptation
- Publication date: April 2023
- No. of issues: 2
- Main character(s): Bucky Bug, Elmer Elephant, Donald Duck, The Three Little Pigs, Snow White, Pluto

Creative team
- Written by: Earl Duvall, Ted Osborne, Merrill De Maris, Hubie Karp
- Artist(s): Al Taliaferro
- Penciller(s): Al Taliaferro, Earl Duvall, Hank Porter, Bob Grant
- Inker(s): Al Taliaferro, Floyd Gottfredson, Bob Grant
- Editor(s): David Gerstein

Walt Disney's Silly Symphonies is a series of books collecting Disney's Silly Symphony Sunday comic strip. Following a previous collection by IDW Publishing, this project is published by Fantagraphics Books under the supervision of David Gerstein. The first book of the series was released in April 2023.

== Volumes ==
Volumes
Vol.	Release date	Title	Period	Main appearances	Page count	ISBN	Inducks link
1	2023-04-11	Walt Disney's Silly Symphonies 1932-1935: Starring Bucky Bug and Donald Duck	1932-1935	Bucky Bug, Bennie Bird, Peter Penguin, Donald Duck, Max Hare, Toby Tortoise, Ambrose	192	978-1-68396-701-9	WDSS 1
2	2023-12-12	Walt Disney's Silly Symphonies 1935-1939: Starring Donald Duck and the Big Bad Wolf	1935-1939	Three Little Kittens, Elmer Elephant, The Three Little Pigs, The Big Bad Wolf, Donald Duck, Snow White, The Seven Dwarfs, Pluto, Spotty Pig	218	978-1-68396-890-0	WDSS 2

== See also ==
- Silly Symphonies: The Complete Disney Classics, another Silly Symphony collection by a different editor
- Donald Duck: The Complete Daily Newspaper Comics
- Donald Duck: The Complete Sunday Comics
- Walt Disney's Mickey Mouse

== External sites ==
- Walt Disney's Silly Symphonies at the INDUCKS
- Publisher's website - Fantagraphics Books
