= Silly Symphonies: The Complete Disney Classics =

Book series

Walt Disney's Silly Symphonies: The Complete Disney Classics

Publication information
- Publisher: The Library of American Comics
- Format: Hardcover
- Genre: Funny animals Adventure; Humour; Adaptation
- Publication date: April 2016 – September 2019
- No. of issues: 4
- Main character(s): Bucky Bug, Elmer Elephant, Donald Duck, The Three Little Pigs, Snow White, Ugly Duckling, Pinocchio, Pluto, Little Hiawatha, Bambi, Panchito Pistoles, José Carioca

Creative team
- Written by: Earl Duvall, Ted Osborne, Merrill De Maris, Hubie Karp
- Artist: Al Taliaferro
- Penciller(s): Al Taliaferro, Earl Duvall, Hank Porter, Bob Grant
- Inker(s): Al Taliaferro, Floyd Gottfredson, Bob Grant
- Editor: Dean Mullaney

Silly Symphonies: The Complete Disney Classics is a book series which reprints Walt Disney's Silly Symphony Sunday comic strip, drawn by several different Disney artists from 1932 to 1945. The strip was published by King Features Syndicate. The strip often introduced new Disney characters to the public, including its first comic character, Bucky Bug. The series was published by The Library of American Comics from 2016 to 2019.

== Background ==
From 1929 to 1939, the Walt Disney Company produced 75 original animated short features under the Silly Symphony line. These shorts were originally designed as whimsical one-shots without ongoing characters; later such stars as Bucky Bug, the Big Bad Wolf, Max Hare, and Toby Tortoise were introduced, either as recurring figures or as characters who were expanded upon later in Disney comics. Donald Duck, "born" in a Silly Symphony short, quickly became a regular in Mickey Mouse films and then his own standalone series.

The Silly Symphony cartoon shorts helped Disney push the limits of what could be done with animation in terms of character effects and storytelling, and inspired the invention of the multiplane camera, a recording device allowing animated films to create tracking shots, which in turn made it possible to tell stories in new ways. The Silly Symphonies shorts were a great success, winning the Academy Award for Best Animated Short Films seven times. The series also branched out to include a series of children's books, comic books and a newspaper Sunday comic strip, drawn primarily by Al Taliaferro.

The comic strip was syndicated through 1945. Seven years later, Dell Comics launched a series of 100-page comic books under the Silly Symphony brand; these predominantly featured new standalone stories, though a few were redraws of earlier Sunday newspaper strip material. In total, Dell Comics published nine of these comic books. While some of the 1930s Silly Symphony children's books were published in black and white, the comic books were all in color.

== IDW book series ==
In April 2016, IDW Publishing and The Library of American Comics began reprinting the Silly Symphony Sunday comic strips under the series title Silly Symphonies: The Complete Disney Classics.

The books are hardcover with a sewn binding, a sewn linen bookmark, and a dust jacket. They measure 12 × 8.5 inches, approximately 305 × 216 mm, and are set in a landscape format. This format allows each Sunday page to be as close to the original size as possible.

The comics are scanned from the original Disney proofs, which have been archived in vaults located in Glendale and Burbank, California, U.S. Each print is in full color throughout the volumes, identical to the comic strips, originally published in full color. Each volume of the series has about 210 pages, in which approximately ten pages are supplementary material including introductions by the film historian and author J. B. Kaufman.

Volumes from the series were sold separately. The release schedule for the series was one volume every ten months.

== Volumes ==
Volumes
| Vol. | Release date | Title | Period | Main appearances | Page count | ISBN | Inducks link |
|---|---|---|---|---|---|---|---|
| 1 | 2016-04-27 | Silly Symphonies: The Complete Disney Classics Vol. 1 | 1932-1935 | Bucky Bug, Bennie Bird, Peter Penguin, Donald Duck, Max Hare, Toby Tortoise, Ambrose, Miss Bonbon | 216 | 978-1-63140-558-7 | SSSC 1 |
| 2 | 2017-02-08 | Silly Symphonies: The Complete Disney Classics Vol. 2 | 1935-1939 | Three Little Kittens, Elmer Elephant, The Three Little Pigs, The Big Bad Wolf, Donald Duck, Snow White, The Seven Dwarfs, Pluto, Spotty Pig | 224 | 978-1-63140-804-5 | SSSC 2 |
| 3 | 2017-11-22 | Silly Symphonies: The Complete Disney Classics Vol. 3 | 1939-1942 | Pluto, Ugly Duckling, Pinocchio, Little Hiawatha | 208 | 978-1-63140-988-2 | SSSC 3 |
| 4 | 2019-09-17 | Silly Symphonies: The Complete Disney Classics Vol. 4 | 1942-1945 | Bambi, José Carioca, Panchito Pistoles | 192 | 978-1-68405-264-6 | SSSC 4 |

== See also ==
- Walt Disney's Silly Symphonies - another Silly Symphonies collection by Fantagraphics Books
- Donald Duck: The Complete Daily Newspaper Comics
- Donald Duck: The Complete Sunday Comics
- Walt Disney's Mickey Mouse
