= Donald Duck (comic strip) =

1938-1995 American comic strip

- Author(s): Homer Brightman, Bob Karp, Greg Crosby, Bob Foster
- Illustrator(s): Al Taliaferro, Frank Grundeen, Frank Smith, Jim Franzen, Ulrich Schröder, Jorgen Klubien, Daan Jippes, Tony Strobl, Bill Langley, Pete Alvaredo, Larry Mayer, Larry Knighton
- Current status/schedule: Concluded, in reruns
- Launch date: (dailies) February 7, 1938 (Sunday) December 10, 1939
- End date: (dailies) July 8, 1995 (Sunday) July 9, 1995
- Syndicate(s): King Features
- Genre(s): Humour; Gag-a-day; Funny animals

Donald Duck is an American comic strip by the Walt Disney Company starring Donald Duck, distributed by King Features Syndicate. The first daily Donald Duck strip debuted in American newspapers on February 7, 1938. On December 10, 1939, the strip expanded to a Sunday page as well. Writer Bob Karp and artist Al Taliaferro worked together on the strip for more than 30 years. The strip ended on July 8, 1995.

Starting in 2015, IDW Publishing's Library of American Comics imprint has been reprinting hardcover collections of the Donald Duck strip. As of 2019, five volumes of Donald Duck: The Complete Daily Newspaper Comics and two volumes of Donald Duck: The Complete Sunday Comics have been released.

== Publication history ==
Disney artist Al Taliaferro was hired at the Walt Disney Studio in January 1931, and given the job of inking Floyd Gottfredson's art for the Mickey Mouse comic strip. When the Sunday topper strip Silly Symphony was created in January 1932, Taliaferro began inking that strip as well, for Earl Duvall's pencils. By June, Duvall moved on and Taliaferro handled all of the art duties for Silly Symphony.

In 1934, Taliaferro drew the Silly Symphony story arc based on the cartoon The Wise Little Hen, which featured the first appearance of Donald Duck as a secondary character. That story, which lasted on the Sunday pages from September to December 1934, gave Taliaferro a particular liking for the Duck's character. He pitched the idea of a Donald strip to Walt Disney, and Disney allowed him a trial run in the Silly Symphony comic. Finishing up a "The Three Little Pigs" adaptation, Taliaferro and writer Ted Osborne began an extended run of Donald Duck gag strips from August 30, 1936, to December 5, 1937.

Taliaferro then pitched the idea of moving Donald to his own solo comic strip to Roy O. Disney, who rejected it. Taliaferro then produced three weeks-worth of episodes for a Donald Duck comic strip, brought them to Roy Disney, and asked him to offer the strip to King Features Syndicate for publication. (King Features had syndicated all Disney comic strips up to this point.) Roy Disney was not particularly interested, but his brother Walt Disney could see potential in the project. Taliaferro's original sample stories were rejected due to having "weak gags". Taliaferro co-operated with writer Merrill De Maris to create new sample stories, but these were also rejected. Taliaferro then co-operated with writer Homer Brightman, and this time the sample stories were approved. Taliaferro's idea was greenlighted and the new Donald Duck comic strip was about to begin.

On February 7, 1938, the Donald Duck comic strip started appearing in daily newspapers. Overcoming further sales resistance from Roy O. Disney and King Features, Taliaferro convinced them to add a Sunday strip as well. The Sunday version was added on December 10, 1939. Taliaferro's was the strip's main penciller, while Homer Brightman was its writer and came up with the gags. But Brightman was mostly a screenwriter, and in 1940 quit the comic strip and returned to writing plots for animated short films. Brightman was replaced by Bob Karp, who would serve as Taliaferro's main creative partner for the rest of his career. The inkers for the comic strip included Karl Karpé (1940–1942), Dick Moores (1942–1943), George Waiss (1943–1946), Manuel Gonzalez (1955–1957), Bill Wright (1960), Al Hubbard (1965), Kay Wright (1965), Ellis Erringer (1965–1967) and Frank Grundeen (1967–1968).

The strip was an immediate success. King Features Syndicate's promotional material bragged that Donald Duck was picked up by 203 papers in 12 weeks, "the all-time syndication record!"

Taliaferro retired from the daily comic strip on October 10, 1967. He kept working on the Sunday version of the strip until his death in February, 1969. Since 1967, Taliaferro's duties on the comic strip had mostly been handled by Frank Grundeen, who replaced Taliaferro as the main artist upon his retirement and death. Bob Karp remained the strip's main writer until his retirement in 1974, with his last Sunday strip published November 29, 1975. Grundeen stayed on the strip as artist until 1976; his last daily was published on May 22, and his last Sunday on June 20, 1976.

The Donald Duck comic strip continued with new writers and artists over the following decades. The strip was written by Greg Crosby from 1974 to 1980, and Bob Foster from 1980 to 1990. When Grundeen left in 1976, Frank Smith was the artist from 1976 to 1986.

A large team of artists worked on the strip in 1986 and 1987, including Jim Franzen, Daan Jippes, Ulrich Schröder, Jorgen Klubien, Rick Hoover, Jules Coenen, Bill Langley, Tony Strobl, Brian Lum and Ennis McNulty. The strip stabilized in May 1987 with Pete Alvarado on pencils and Larry Mayer on inks, until January 7, 1990.

In 1990, Bob Foster, Pete Alvarado and Larry Mayer, all left the strip, which went into reprints starting in January.

After Disney opted to end its 60-year association with King Features, switching to the fledgling Creators Syndicate, the Donald Duck daily strip started up again in May 1990 with Larry Knighton as writer and artist, and after a brief hiatus, he resumed the Sunday strip in September of that year. Knighton took the opportunity to bring the classic Carl Barks cast into the strip, like Gladstone Gander and Gyro Gearloose, as well as non-Barks characters like Duckworth, Scrooge McDuck's butler from the DuckTales animated TV series.

Knighton continued until July 1995 (dailies: July 8; Sunday: July 9), when Disney closed its comic strip department, with Creators Syndicate publishing reruns until 2014.

== Story and characters ==
While the Mickey Mouse comic strip was an adventure series, the Donald Duck comic strip continued to be a daily comedy series. Each episode featured Donald dealing with problems and humorous situations. Most of the strips featured stand-alone gags, although some ongoing plots were introduced. The strips often lacked dialogue.

Taliaferro and Karp started expanding the Donald Duck universe by introducing new supporting characters for the protagonist. On March 17, 1938, they introduced Bolivar, Donald's pet St. Bernard. The strip found humor in the fact that Bolivar rarely listens to his owner. Taliaferro reportedly drew inspiration from his own pet dog, which was a Scottish Terrier. Gus Goose, the "lazy and gluttonous" cousin of Donald, was introduced on May 9, 1938.

On 4 November 1940, Taliaferro and Karp introduced a comic strip version of Daisy Duck, as Donald's new neighbour and love interest. The character had been created by Carl Barks for the short film Mr. Duck Steps Out (1940).

Grandma Duck, Donald's grandmother, was introduced on September 27, 1943. Taliaferro based the character on his mother-in-law and her old-fashioned ways. Taliaferro's version of Grandma is a hard-working farmer, but out of touch with the technological progress of the world surrounding her.

A comic strip version of Scrooge McDuck was added by Taliaferro on February 13, 1951, and Ludwig Von Drake on September 25, 1961. Larry Knighton's run in the last five years of the strip eliminated Professor Von Drake from the cast; his last strip was December 31, 1989.

Donald's car, the 313, was designed by Taliaferro on July 1, 1938. It has been associated with the character ever since.

=== Characters ===
- Donald Duck (introduced with the comic strip in February 1937)
- Huey, Dewey, and Louie (introduced in October 1937)
- Bolivar the St. Bernard (introduced in March 1938)
- Gus Goose (introduced in May 1938)
- Hortense the Ostrich (introduced in October 1938)
- Daisy Duck (introduced in November 1940)
- Grandma Duck (introduced in September 1943)
- Socrates M. Gosling (introduced in April 1944)
- Scrooge McDuck (introduced in February 1951)
- Donna Duck (introduced in August 1951)
- Ludwig von Drake (introduced in September 1961)
- Moby Duck (introduced in December 1971)
- Gyro Gearloose (introduced in August 1990)
- Gladstone Gander (introduced in August 1990)

== Reprints and collections ==
=== Big Little Books ===
In the 1930s and '40s, Western Publishing published a very popular series of small hardcover books for children known as Big Little Books. These chunky, compact books featured a captioned illustration on one page, with a page of text on the facing page. The stories featured a wide assortment of popular characters, including a number of Disney stars, and Taliaferro's Silly Symphony and Donald Duck strips provided material for many books. A Donald Duck Big Little Book would contain about 15 "stories", at 20 pages each—which is enough to narrate each panel of a Taliaferro Sunday strip as a story.

The following Big Little Books were published based on Donald Duck comic strips:

- Donald Duck and His (Mis)Adventures (1937)
- Silly Symphony, Featuring Donald Duck (1937)
- Donald Duck Hunting for Trouble (1938)
- Donald Duck (Such a Life) (1939)
- Donald Forgets to Duck (1939)
- Donald Duck Gets Fed Up (1940)
- Donald Duck Says Such Luck!' (1941)
- Donald Duck Sees Stars (1941)
- Donald Duck Headed for Trouble (1942)
- Donald Duck Off the Beam! (1943)
- Donald Duck Is Here Again (1944)

=== Comic books ===
In 1940, several Donald Duck strips were reprinted in Dell Comics' Four Color (1st series) issue #4, Donald Duck.

Disney's flagship comic book, Walt Disney's Comics and Stories, was launched in 1940, and relied on reprints of the Donald Duck and Mickey Mouse comic strips for most of the content. The comic strips were gradually phased out as the Disney artists started producing more original material.

=== The Library of American Comics ===
In 2015, IDW Publishing's imprint, The Library of American Comics, began releasing hardcover collections of the Donald Duck and Silly Symphony comic strips.

Donald's first appearance in Silly Symphony's adaptation of The Wise Little Hen was reprinted in the first volume of Silly Symphonies: The Complete Disney Classics in 2016; and later the original run of Silly Symphony Donald Duck gag strips followed in this series' second volume (2017).

The publishing of Donald Duck: The Complete Daily Newspaper Comics as a series started in 2015; by 2019, there have been five volumes released. The companion collection Donald Duck: The Complete Sunday Comics was later launched in 2016; so far, it has had two volumes published.
