= Donald Duck: The Complete Daily Newspaper Comics =

Walt Disney's Donald Duck: The Complete Daily Newspaper Comics

Publication information
- Publisher: The Library of American Comics
- Schedule: 1–2 per year
- Format: Hardcover
- Genre: Funny animals Humour; Gag-a-day
- Publication date: September 2015
- No. of issues: 5 to date
- Main character(s): Donald Duck, Huey, Dewey and Louie, Daisy Duck, Grandma Duck, Bolivar

Creative team
- Created by: Bob Karp, Al Taliaferro
- Written by: Homer Brightman, Bob Karp
- Artist(s): Al Taliaferro
- Penciller(s): Al Taliaferro
- Inker(s): Al Taliaferro, George Waiss, Dick Moores
- Editor(s): Dean Mullaney

Donald Duck: The Complete Daily Newspaper Comics is a series of hardcover books collecting the complete run of the Disney Donald Duck comic strip, a daily newspaper comic strip drawn by the American comic artist Al Taliaferro. The comic strip debuted on February 7, 1938, and within eight weeks became the fastest growing syndicated comic strip worldwide. The publisher behind the project is IDW Publishing and their imprint, The Library of American Comics. The first book of the series was released on September 2, 2015.

== Format ==
The books come in a hardcover format, which includes a sewn binding, linen bookmark and dust jacket. The landscape orientation of the books measures 11 in × 8.5 in (approximately 279 mm × 216 mm), which allows each comic strip to be reproduced as close to the original published size as possible. Each page accommodates three daily strips.

Only the supplementary material appears in full colour since the daily comic strips were first published in black-and-white in the newspapers. The strips are scanned from the original syndicate proofs of the Disney archives. It's printed on high quality acid-free paper stock. Each volume of the series has about 280 pages and contains close to 750 daily strips (the equivalent to a 2.5-year original newspaper run). Roughly ten pages of supplemental material are included, such as promotional art, portraits of the creators, and introductory essays by animation historian David Gerstein.

However, LoAC's venture seems to have ended with an incomplete run, as no further volumes have been published since 2019.

== Volumes ==
Volumes
Vol.	Release date	Title	Period	Page count	ISBN	Inducks link
1	2015-09-02	Donald Duck: The Complete Daily Newspaper Comics Vol. 1	1938-1940	272	978-1-63140-335-4	DDN 1
2	2015-12-23	Donald Duck: The Complete Daily Newspaper Comics Vol. 2	1940-1942	278	978-1-63140-502-0	DDN 2
3	2016-06-29	Donald Duck: The Complete Daily Newspaper Comics Vol. 3	1943-1945	280	978-1-63140-641-6	DDN 3
4	2017-06-07	Donald Duck: The Complete Daily Newspaper Comics Vol. 4	1945-1947	280	978-1-63140-861-8	DDN 4
5	2019-03-26	Donald Duck: The Complete Daily Newspaper Comics Vol. 5	1948-1950	272	978-1-68405-462-6	DDN 5

== Translated versions ==
In 2019 the Italian publisher Panini Comics began to publish a translated version of this reprint series titled: "Donald Duck - Le Strisce Quotidiane Complete". In November 2022, Panini began publishing this collection in Brazil as "Pato Donald: As Tiras Diárias de Jornal Por Al Taliaferro".

== See also ==
- Donald Duck: The Complete Sunday Comics
- Silly Symphonies: The Complete Disney Classics
- Walt Disney's Mickey Mouse
- Walt Disney's Silly Symphonies
