= Mickey Mouse in Color =

Mickey Mouse in Color was a book published in 1988 by Another Rainbow Publishing, featuring the works of Disney comic artists Floyd Gottfredson and Carl Barks.

== Content ==
72 pages were devoted to the Mickey Mouse Sunday page by Floyd Gottfredson and an additional 72 pages featuring Mickey Mouse daily strips by Floyd Gottfredson. In addition, there are two Mickey Mouse drawings of Carl Barks that he submitted to the Disney Studios in the mid-1930s.

The book contains special articles and interviews with Gottfredson and Barks, including rare drawings, photographs, and published art. Finally, each book contains a numbered 7-inch record, which features a portion of Bruce Hamilton's interview with Floyd Gottfredson and Carl Barks.
