= Snow White (franchise) =

Disney media franchise

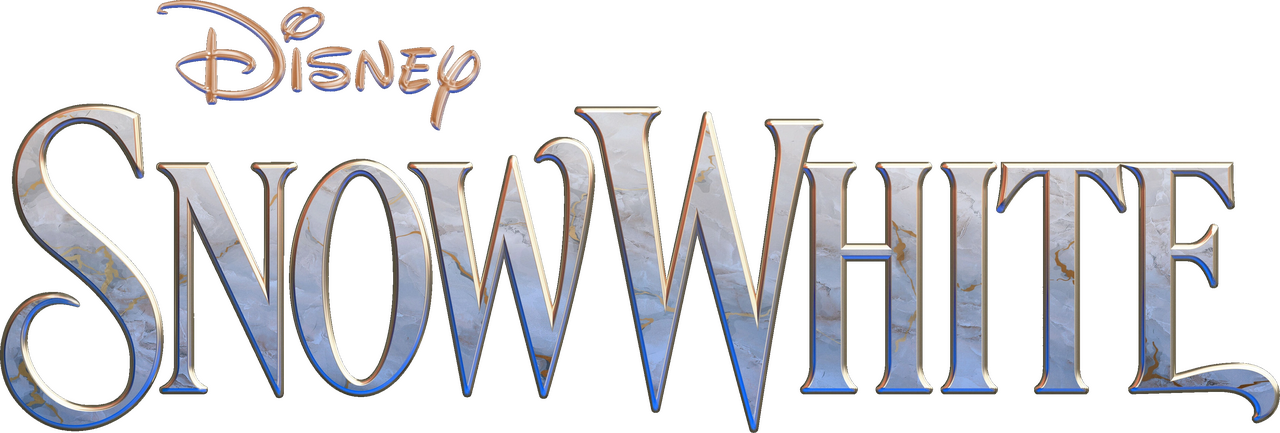
- Logo used since the 2025 film
- Original work: Snow White and the Seven Dwarfs (1937)
- Owner: The Walt Disney Company
- Based on: Snow White by the Brothers Grimm

Films and television
- Film(s): Snow White and the Seven Dwarfs (1937); Snow White (2025)
- Short film(s): The Standard Parade (1939); The Seven Wise Dwarfs (1941); All Together (1942); The Winged Scourge (1943)
- Television series: Once Upon a Time (2011–2018)^{*}
- Animated series: House of Mouse (2001–2003)^{*}; Sofia the First (2012–2018)^{*}; The 7D (2014–2016)
- Television film(s): Descendants (2015)^{*}
- Direct-to-video: Once Upon a Halloween (2005)^{*}

Theatrical presentations
- Musical(s): Snow White and the Seven Dwarfs (1979); Snow White: An Enchanting Musical (2004)

Games
- Video game(s): Snow White and the Seven Dwarfs (Atari 2600; unreleased); Walt Disney's Snow White and the Seven Dwarfs (Game Boy Color; 2001); Kingdom Hearts (2002)^{*}; Kingdom Hearts Birth by Sleep (2010)^{*}; Snow White: Queen's Return (2013); Disney Magical World 2 (2015)^{*}; Disney Magic Kingdoms (2016)^{*}; Disney Mirrorverse (2022)^{*}

Audio
- Soundtrack(s): Snow White and the Seven Dwarfs (1938); Snow White (2025)

Miscellaneous
- Theme park attraction(s): Snow White's Enchanted Wish (2021-present); Snow White's Scary Adventures (1955–2020); Snow White Grotto (1961–present); Snow White's Adventures (1971–1994); Snow White: An Enchanting Musical (2004–2006); Seven Dwarfs Mine Train (2014–present)
- ^{*} Work where this franchise's characters or settings appeared as part of a crossover, or has characters based on those from this franchise.

Snow White is a Disney media franchise that began in 1937 with the theatrical release of Snow White and the Seven Dwarfs. It is based on the 1812 fairy tale by the Brothers Grimm, set in Medieval and Renaissance Europe.

== Theatrical films ==
=== Snow White and the Seven Dwarfs (1937) ===
Snow White and the Seven Dwarfs is a 1937 American animated film produced by Walt Disney Productions and released by RKO Radio Pictures. Based on the German fairy tale by the Brothers Grimm, it is the first full-length animated feature film and the first Disney animated feature film. In 1989, Snow White and the Seven Dwarfs was selected for preservation in the National Film Registry by the Library of Congress for being "culturally, historically, or aesthetically significant".

=== Snow White (2025) ===
In late October 2016, a live-action remake of Snow White and the Seven Dwarfs was announced, with Erin Cressida Wilson writing the script and Marc Platt producing. The remake expands upon the story of the 1937 film, and includes new songs written by Pasek and Paul. By September 2019, Marc Webb signed on to direct the film. In June 2021, Rachel Zegler was cast as Snow White and it was also reported that production would begin in 2022. Filming took place in the United Kingdom from March through July 2022, with additional filming and pick-ups taking place in June 2024. The film was released on March 21, 2025.

== Comics ==
A comic strip adaptation of Disney's Snow White and the Seven Dwarfs was released to coincide with the release of the film. The comic strip was written by Merrill de Marris and drawn by Hank Porter, both staff at Walt Disney Pictures.

The original strip ran on Sundays from December 12, 1937 to April 24, 1938 and was distributed by King Features Syndicate. The sequence ran in Disney's Silly Symphony slot, as a Sunday topper for Mickey Mouse.

The strip used a number of story ideas that were ultimately abandoned in the film, including a more elaborate and comical meeting between the Prince and Snow White (in which Snow White creates a "dummy" of her dream prince, which the real Prince sneaks into), and an entire storyline in which the Evil Queen kidnaps the Prince to prevent him from saving Snow White. Both of these abandoned concepts were notably recycled for use in Sleeping Beauty.

The comic was packaged and released as a comic book in 1938, 1944, 1951, 1987 and 1995 by Whitman Comics, Dell, Gold Key, Gladstone and Marvel.

Mondadori, the Italian publisher of Disney comics, produced various stories in comic book format featuring characters from Snow White and the Seven Dwarfs for Italian (and eventually European) consumption: the first such story, originally serialized in 1939 in the weekly magazine Donald Duck and Other Adventures (Paperino e altre avventure), was Snow White and Basilisk the Wizard (Biancaneve e il mago Basilisco) by Federico Pedrocchi (script) and Nino Pagot (art), a direct sequel to the American comic strip adaptation where Snow White's infant son is kidnapped by an evil wizard and rescued by the Seven Dwarfs. The following year, Pedrocchi and Pagot produced another story starring the Seven Dwarfs. Several other Italian stories, often with scripts by Guido Martina and art by Romano Scarpa or Luciano Bottaro, were published in the 1950s and 1960s.

== Direct-to-video and television films ==
=== Mickey's Magical Christmas: Snowed in at the House of Mouse ===
Mickey's Magical Christmas: Snowed in at the House of Mouse, a direct-to-video spin-off film of House of Mouse, featured cameo appearances of the Snow White characters. The Seven Dwarfs (mainly Grumpy) have several running gags throughout the movie.

=== Mickey's House of Villains ===
In Mickey's House of Villains, a direct-to-video spin-off film of House of Mouse, the Evil Queen is seen in her Witch form arriving at the House of Mouse on Halloween night along with various other villains. Throughout the film she is seen sitting in the audience at the club close to other villains, both in her Queen form and in her Witch form.

=== Once Upon a Halloween ===
The Evil Queen appeared in a starring role in the film Once Upon a Halloween, a 2005 direct-to-video film in DVD made by Walt Disney Home Entertainment, featuring the Evil Queen and Disney Villains. The film features clips from Disney movies plus shorts and songs.

=== Descendants ===
Descendants is a live-action Disney Channel Original movie based on the lives of the children of various Disney heroes and villains when they attend the same prep school. Evil Queen appears as one of the main antagonists of the film. Snow White also makes a minor appearance as a television reporter. The film also includes Evil Queen's daughter, Evie, and Dopey's son, Doug, with them both returning in the sequels Descendants 2 and Descendants 3, in addition to other media related to the film.

== Television series ==
=== House of Mouse ===
Disney's animated television series House of Mouse included many Disney animated character cameos such as the Snow White characters. The Magic Mirror, who is hung at the entrance of the club, has a recurring role giving advice to other characters.

=== Once Upon a Time ===
Fantasy television series Once Upon a Time regularly included live-action interpretations of characters including Snow White, the Evil Queen, the Huntsman, the Prince, the Mirror, and Grumpy (including the other dwarves as smaller characters).

=== Sofia the First ===
Snow White appeared in the 27th episode of the animated television series Sofia the First, "The Enchanted Feast". The series features many characters from the Disney Princess franchise. The Evil Queen's crown, known as Grimhilde's Crown, has a main focus in the 103th episode "In Cedric We Trust".

=== The 7D ===
The 7D is a Disney animated series centering on a new version of the Seven Dwarfs. The series premiered on July 7, 2014, on Disney XD.

== Short films ==
The Seven Dwarfs appeared in the shorts The Standard Parade (1939, using mostly recycled animation), 7 Wise Dwarfs (1941, using mostly recycled footage), All Together (1942, using mostly recycled animation) and The Winged Scourge (1943).

== Theme park attractions ==
=== Snow White's Enchanted Wish ===
Snow White's Enchanted Wish is a ride at Disneyland, Tokyo Disneyland, Disneyland Paris, and, formerly, Magic Kingdom at Walt Disney World.

=== Seven Dwarfs Mine Train ===
The Seven Dwarfs Mine Train roller coaster opened in 2013 as part of the New Fantasyland expansion at Magic Kingdom. Snow White, the Prince, the Queen (both in the form of a regent and a hag), and the Seven Dwarfs are also featured in parades and character appearances throughout the parks.

=== Snow White Grotto ===
Snow White Grotto is an attraction at Disneyland in Anaheim, California, Tokyo Disneyland at the Tokyo Disney Resort in Japan and at Hong Kong Disneyland. It is a wishing well located at the west of the Sleeping Beauty Castle (for Disneyland and Hong Kong Disneyland) or Cinderella Castle (for Tokyo Disneyland).

=== Snow White: An Enchanting Musical ===
Disneyland's Fantasyland Theater hosted Snow White: An Enchanting Musical from 2004 to 2006.

== Broadway musical ==
=== Snow White and the Seven Dwarfs ===
The Disney-produced Snow White and the Seven Dwarfs (also known as Snow White Live!) played at Radio City Music Hall. Music and lyrics for four new songs were created by Jay Blackton and Joe Cook, respectively; titles included "Welcome to the Kingdom of Once Upon a Time" and "Will I Ever See Her Again?". It ran from October 18 to November 18, 1979, and January 11 to March 9, 1980, a total of 106 performances.

== Video games ==
=== Snow White and the Seven Dwarfs (Atari) ===
The first attempt at a Snow White and the Seven Dwarfs video game was for the Atari 2600 as part of their line of children's games. It was never officially released, although an unfinished prototype was released as a reproduction cartridge for collectors at the 2002 Classic Gaming Expo, complete with cover art based on Atari's Disney video games of the era.

=== Walt Disney's Snow White and the Seven Dwarfs ===
Snow White and the Seven Dwarfs was released for the Game Boy Color system in 2001.

=== Kingdom Hearts series ===
Snow White also makes an appearance in the PlayStation 2 game Kingdom Hearts as one of the seven fabled Princesses of Heart. A world based on the movie, Dwarf Woodlands, appears in Kingdom Hearts: Birth by Sleep for the PlayStation Portable, and in Kingdom Hearts χ for mobile devices, both games incorporating the Seven Dwarfs, the Queen, the Magic Mirror (also serving as a boss enemy in Birth by Sleep), and the Prince.

=== Snow White: Queen's Return ===
Snow White: Queen's Return (also known as Seven Dwarfs: The Queen's Return) is a 2013 free-to-play mobile game. A non-canonical continuation of the film, the Queen has survived the fall at the climax of the film and then reverted to her youthful form to cast a curse on Snow White, the dwarfs and their entire forest. The game was discontinued a year after its release.

=== Other video games ===
- The Evil Queen is one of the main antagonists in the video game Disney's Villains' Revenge, where she, in her witch form, kidnaps Snow White after poisoning her, hiding her in her castle so that the Prince cannot find her.
- Snow White and the seven dwarfs appear in Disney Magical World as part of the characters that the player can meet. They return in the sequel, Disney Magical World 2, with the Prince also included as a new character.
- During a limited time Event focused on Snow White and the Seven Dwarfs, the world builder game Disney Magic Kingdoms introduced Snow White, all the Seven Dwarfs and the Queen as playable characters, as well as attractions such as Magic Mirror on the Wall (featuring Magic Mirror as a non-player character), Seven Dwarfs' Cottage (featuring a blue bird and a raccoon as non-player characters), Seven Dwarfs Mine Train, and Snow White's Scary Adventures. Prince Charming was also included as a playable character in a later update of the game. In the game the characters are involved in new storylines that serve as a continuation of the events in the film.
- Alternate versions of Snow White and the Evil Queen were included as playable characters in the video game Disney Mirrorverse.
- The video game Disney Dreamlight Valley includes clothing and forniture based on the franchise. Snow White appear as one of the villagers in the game's "Wishblossom Ranch" DLC.

== Music ==
=== Snow White and the Seven Dwarfs ===
Snow White and the Seven Dwarfs, the soundtrack to the 1937 Walt Disney film, was the first commercially issued film soundtrack. It was released in January 1938 as Songs from Walt Disney's Snow White and the Seven Dwarfs (with the Same Characters and Sound Effects as in the Film of That Title) and has since seen numerous expansions and reissues.

== Others ==
The titular protagonist of the franchise, Snow White, is a character used in the Disney Princess franchise. While the main antagonist of the franchise, the Evil Queen, is a character used frequently in the Disney Villains franchise.
