= Walt Disney's Mickey Mouse =

2011–2018 collection of Mickey Mouse comic strips

- Cover to Volume 1, Race to Death Valley

Publication information
- Publisher: Fantagraphics Books
- Schedule: biannual
- Format: Hardcover
- Genre: Funny animals; Adventure
- Publication date: June 2011 – January 2018
- No. of issues: 14 (12 black & white, 2 full color)
- Main character(s): Mickey Mouse, Minnie Mouse, Goofy, Donald Duck, Pete, Clarabelle Cow, Horace Horsecollar

Creative team
- Created by: Floyd Gottfredson
- Artist: Floyd Gottfredson
- Editors: David Gerstein; Gary Groth

Walt Disney's Mickey Mouse (also known as The Floyd Gottfredson Library) is a 2011–2018 series of books collecting the span of work by Floyd Gottfredson on the daily Mickey Mouse comic strip in twelve volumes, as well as Gottfredson's Sunday strips of the same title over two separate volumes. The strips are reproduced from Disney proof sheets and artwork from private collections.

== Background ==
The strip debuted on January 13, 1930, and was initially written by Walt Disney and drawn first by Ub Iwerks, then by Win Smith. Gottfredson took over the strip when Disney and Smith found themselves too busy, and he continued with it until 1975. These volumes start with Gottfredson's work from April 1, 1930, while including the earlier non-Gottfredson strips in an appendix to the first volume. The series is uncensored, and as the strips were done in the 1930s, some of the strips may come across as offensive to modern readers, especially due to racial stereotypes that were common at the time. As presented in the books, however, the more dated material is accompanied by explanatory text, putting it in the context of its historical time.

Gottfredson's run on Mickey Mouse lasted until 1975. In the earlier years, which are the focus of this series, it was a humorous adventure strip—as was common at the time—but in the later years became gag-focused.

These books are the first time Gottfredson's work has been collected in North America, although they've previously been collected in the 1980s in Germany as The Complete Daily Strip Adventures of Mickey Mouse 1930–1955 and in 2010 in Italy as Gli anni d'oro di Topolino.

== Format ==
The hardcover volumes have been edited by David Gerstein and Gary Groth while designed by Jacob Covey, and are in a 10.5 inches × 8.75" inches (267 mm × 222 mm) landscape format. They are mostly in black-and-white, with some color pages, and each collects two years worth of strips. The strips are printed three to a page, with dozens of pages of supplementary material. The two Color Sundays volumes are in full color.

The comic strips in the volumes have been reproduced from Disney's own master proof sheets of the strip.

The books of the series were available separately as well as in two-volume box sets.

== Volumes and box sets ==
Vol.	Title	Date	Period(s)	Cover Art	Page count	ISBN	Notes	INDUCKS
1	Race to Death Valley	2011-06-15	Daily strips January 13, 1930 – January 9, 1932	Mickey Mouse	288	978-1-606-99441-2	Volume begins with "Mickey Mouse in Death Valley", the first story Gottfredson worked on (starting April 1, 1930); Includes "Lost on a Desert Island" by Walt Disney and Win Smith (Jan 13 – Mar 31 1930 strips) in appendix	
2	Trapped on Treasure Island	2011-10-31	Daily strips January 11, 1932 – January 9, 1934	Horace Horsecollar	280	978-1-606-99495-5	Includes "Return to Blaggard Castle" (modern sequel to one of the book's Gottfredson stories) in appendix	
3	High Noon at Inferno Gulch	2012-07-02	Daily strips January 10, 1934 – January 4, 1936	Mickey Mouse	280	978-1-606-99531-0	Includes 1937 Donald Duck story "The Secret of Mars" by Federico Pedrocchi from Donald Duck and Other Adventures (Paperino e altre avventure) in appendix	
4	House of The Seven Haunts!	2012-11-15	Daily strips January 6, 1936 – February 5, 1938	Goofy	280	978-1-606-99575-4	Includes "Mystery of Freefer Hall" by Don Markstein and César Ferioli (modern sequel to one of the book's Gottfredson stories) in appendix	
Color Sundays 1	Call of the Wild	2013-07-19	Sunday strips 1932–1935	Mickey Mouse and Donald Duck	280	978-1-606-99643-0	Includes 1931–1933 Mickey strips by Fred Spencer and Guglielmo Guastaveglia (Gottfredson-inspired spin-offs for foreign and non-newspaper publication) in appendix	
Color Sundays 2	Robin Hood Rides Again	2013-11-16	Sunday strips 1936–1938 plus select later dates; Gottfredson Silly Symphonies and Treasury of Classic Tales strips 1937, 1956–1961	Mickey Mouse with Morty and Ferdie Fieldmouse	280	978-1-606-99686-7	Includes 1940–1951 Mickey strips by Manuel Gonzales (Gottfredson's successor on the Mickey Sunday page) in appendix	
5	Mickey Mouse Outwits the Phantom Blot	2014-06-22	Daily strips February 7, 1938 – April 20, 1940	Mickey Mouse	280	978-1-60699-736-9	Includes 1955 revision of "Phantom Blot" storyline in appendix, redone by Paul Murry to conform to 1950s comics censorship	
6	Lost in Lands of Long Ago	2014-11-16	Daily strips April 22, 1940 – May 2, 1942	Pete	272	978-1-606-99782-6	Includes "Riddle of the Red Hat" by Carl Barks (Barks' one Mickey comic book story, reusing some Gottfredson characters and poses) in appendix	
7	March of the Zombies	2015-05-01	Daily strips May 4, 1942 – April 15, 1944	Mickey Mouse	272	978-1-606-99829-8	Includes "The Professor's Experiment" by Bill Wright (World War II Mickey Sunday serial supervised by Gottfredson) in appendix	
8	The Tomorrow Wars	2015-12-07	Daily strips April 17, 1944 – July 27, 1946	Minnie Mouse	272	978-1-606-99868-7	Includes "A Mickey Mystery" by Byron Erickson and Cesar Ferioli (modern sequel to various Gottfredson stories) in appendix	
9	Rise of the Rhyming Man	2016-07-12	Daily strips July 29, 1946 – October 9, 1948	Mickey Mouse	288	978-1-606-99931-8	Includes "Lost in the Microcosmos" by Romano Scarpa in appendix	
10	Planet of Faceless Foes	2016-12-06	Daily strips October 11, 1948 – March 24, 1951	Eega Beeva	296	978-1-606-99963-9	Includes "Stir Crazy" by Noel Van Horn in appendix.	
11	Mickey vs. Mickey	2017-09-06	Daily strips March 26, 1951 – June 20, 1953	Mickey Mouse	296	978-1-683-96018-8	Includes "The Seven Dupes" by Andrea "Casty" Castellan (modern sequel to one of the book's Gottfredson stories) in appendix.	
12	The Mysterious Dr. X	2018-01-23	Daily strips June 22, 1953 – October 4, 1955	Goofy	296	978-1-683-96055-3	Includes Disney Christmas Story 1963–1965 continuities drawn by Gottfredson	

=== Box sets ===
Box sets
Vol.	Release date	Title	Volumes	Period(s)	ISBN
1	2011-10-31	Walt Disney's Mickey Mouse Vols. 1 & 2	1 & 2	1930–1934	978-1-60699-496-2
2	2012-11-15	Walt Disney's Mickey Mouse Vols. 3 & 4	3 & 4	1934–1938	978-1-60699-576-1
3	2014-12-06	Walt Disney's Mickey Mouse Vols. 5 & 6	5 & 6	1938–1942	978-1-60699-783-3
4	2015-12-07	Walt Disney's Mickey Mouse Vols. 7 & 8	7 & 8	1942–1946	978-1-60699-869-4
5	2016-12-06	Walt Disney's Mickey Mouse Vols. 9 & 10	9 & 10	1946–1951	978-1-60699-964-6
6	2018-01-23	Walt Disney's Mickey Mouse Vols. 11 & 12	11 & 12	1951–1955	978-1-68396-056-0
N/A	2013-11-16	Walt Disney's Mickey Mouse Color Sundays	CS 1 & CS 2	1932–1938, 1956–1961	978-1-60699-687-4

== List of storylines featured in the series ==
=== Daily strips ===
Title	Dates	Writer	Pencils	Inking
Volume 1: Race to Death Valley
Lost on a Desert Island	January 13 – March 31, 1930	Walt Disney	Ub Iwerks; Win Smith	Win Smith
Mickey Mouse in Death Valley	April 1 – September 20, 1930	Walt Disney; Floyd Gottfredson	Win Smith; Floyd Gottfredson; Jack King	Win Smith; Floyd Gottfredson; Roy Nelson; Hardie Gramatky
Mr. Slicker and the Egg Robbers	September 22 – December 29, 1930	Floyd Gottfredson	Floyd Gottfredson	Floyd Gottfredson; Hardie Gramatky; Earl Duvall
Mickey Mouse Music	December 30, 1930 – January 3, 1931	Floyd Gottfredson	Earl Duvall	Earl Duvall
The Picnic	January 5–10, 1931	Floyd Gottfredson	Floyd Gottfredson	Earl Duvall
Traffic Troubles	January 12–17, 1931	Floyd Gottfredson	Earl Duvall; Floyd Gottfredson	Earl Duvall
Mickey Mouse vs. Kat Nipp	January 19 – February 25, 1931	Floyd Gottfredson	Floyd Gottfredson; Earl Duvall	Earl Duvall
Mickey Mouse, Boxing Champion	February 26 – April 29, 1931	Floyd Gottfredson	Earl Duvall; Floyd Gottfredson	Earl Duvall; Al Taliaferro
High Society	April 30 – May 30, 1931	Floyd Gottfredson	Floyd Gottfredson	Al Taliaferro
Circus Roustabout	June 1 – July 7, 1931	Floyd Gottfredson	Floyd Gottfredson	Al Taliaferro
Pluto the Pup	July 8–18, 1931	Floyd Gottfredson	Floyd Gottfredson	Al Taliaferro
Mickey Mouse and the Ransom Plot	July 20 – November 7, 1931	Floyd Gottfredson	Floyd Gottfredson	Al Taliaferro
Fireman Mickey	November 9 – December 5, 1931	Floyd Gottfredson	Floyd Gottfredson	Al Taliaferro
Clarabelle's Boarding House	December 7, 1931 – January 9, 1932	Floyd Gottfredson	Floyd Gottfredson	Al Taliaferro
Volume 2: Trapped on Treasure Island
The Great Orphanage Robbery	January 11 – May 14, 1932	Floyd Gottfredson	Floyd Gottfredson	Al Taliaferro
Mickey Mouse Sails for Treasure Island	May 16 – November 12, 1932	Floyd Gottfredson	Floyd Gottfredson	Al Taliaferro; Ted Thwaites
Blaggard Castle	November 14, 1932 – February 10, 1933	Floyd Gottfredson (story); Webb Smith (script)	Floyd Gottfredson	Ted Thwaites
Pluto and the Dogcatcher	February 11–25, 1933	Floyd Gottfredson (story); Ted Osborne (script)	Floyd Gottfredson	Ted Thwaites
The Mail Pilot	February 27 – June 10, 1933	Floyd Gottfredson (story); Ted Osborne (script)	Floyd Gottfredson	Ted Thwaites
Mickey Mouse and His Horse Tanglefoot	June 12 – October 7, 1933	Floyd Gottfredson (story); Ted Osborne (script)	Floyd Gottfredson	Ted Thwaites
The Crazy Crime Wave	October 9, 1933 – January 9, 1934	Floyd Gottfredson (story); Merrill de Maris (script)	Floyd Gottfredson	Ted Thwaites
Volume 3: High Noon at Inferno Gulch
The Captive Castaways	January 10 – April 17, 1934	Floyd Gottfredson (story); Merrill de Maris (script)	Floyd Gottfredson	Ted Thwaites
Pluto's Rival	April 18–28, 1934	Floyd Gottfredson (story); Ted Osborne (script)	Floyd Gottfredson	Ted Thwaites
The Bat Bandit of Inferno Gulch	April 30 – July 28, 1934	Floyd Gottfredson (story); Ted Osborne (script)	Floyd Gottfredson	Ted Thwaites
Bobo the Elephant	July 30 – October 13, 1934	Floyd Gottfredson (story); Ted Osborne (script)	Floyd Gottfredson	Ted Thwaites
The Sacred Jewel	October 15 – December 29, 1934	Floyd Gottfredson (story); Ted Osborne (script)	Floyd Gottfredson	Ted Thwaites
Pluto the Racer	December 31, 1934 – March 2, 1935	Floyd Gottfredson (story); Ted Osborne (script)	Floyd Gottfredson	Ted Thwaites
Editor-in-Grief	March 4 – June 1, 1935	Floyd Gottfredson (story); Ted Osborne (script)	Floyd Gottfredson	Ted Thwaites
Race for Riches	June 3 – September 28, 1935	Floyd Gottfredson (story); Ted Osborne (script)	Floyd Gottfredson	Ted Thwaites
The Pirate Submarine	September 30, 1935 – January 4, 1936	Floyd Gottfredson (story); Ted Osborne (script)	Floyd Gottfredson	Ted Thwaites
Volume 4: House of the Seven Haunts!
Oscar the Ostrich	January 6 – March 21, 1936	Floyd Gottfredson (story); Ted Osborne (script)	Floyd Gottfredson	Ted Thwaites
Mickey Mouse Joins the Foreign Legion	March 23 – August 8, 1936	Floyd Gottfredson (story); Ted Osborne (script)	Floyd Gottfredson	Ted Thwaites
The Seven Ghosts	August 10 – November 28, 1936	Floyd Gottfredson (story); Ted Osborne (script)	Floyd Gottfredson	Ted Thwaites
Island in the Sky	November 30, 1936 – April 3, 1937	Floyd Gottfredson (story); Ted Osborne (script)	Floyd Gottfredson	Ted Thwaites
In Search of Jungle Treasure	April 5 – August 7, 1937	Floyd Gottfredson (story); Ted Osborne (script)	Floyd Gottfredson	Ted Thwaites
Monarch of Medioka	August 9, 1937 – February 5, 1938	Floyd Gottfredson (story); Ted Osborne (script)	Floyd Gottfredson	Al Taliaferro; Ted Thwaites
Volume 5: Mickey Mouse Outwits the Phantom Blot
Mighty Whale Hunter	February 7 – July 6, 1938	Floyd Gottfredson (story); Merrill de Maris (script)	Floyd Gottfredson	Ted Thwaites; Bill Wright
The Plumber's Helper	July 7 – December 10, 1938	Floyd Gottfredson (story); Merrill de Maris (script)	Floyd Gottfredson	Ted Thwaites; Bill Wright
Mickey Mouse Meets Robinson Crusoe	December 12, 1938 – April 13, 1939	Floyd Gottfredson (story); Merrill de Maris (script)	Floyd Gottfredson	Ted Thwaites; Bill Wright
Unhappy Campers	April 14 – May 20, 1939	Floyd Gottfredson (story); Merrill de Maris (script)	Floyd Gottfredson; Ross Wetzel	Ted Thwaites; Bill Wright
Mickey Mouse Outwits the Phantom Blot	May 22 – September 9, 1939	Floyd Gottfredson (story); Merrill de Maris (script)	Floyd Gottfredson	Ted Thwaites; Bill Wright
The Miracle Master	September 11, 1939 – January 13, 1940	Floyd Gottfredson (story); Merrill de Maris (script)	Floyd Gottfredson	Ted Thwaites; Bill Wright
An Education for Thursday	January 15 – April 20, 1940	Floyd Gottfredson (story); Merrill de Maris (script)	Floyd Gottfredson	Ted Thwaites; Bill Wright
Volume 6: Lost in Lands of Long Ago
The Bar-None Ranch	April 22 – August 17, 1940	Floyd Gottfredson (story); Manuel Gonzales (story); Merrill de Maris (script)	Floyd Gottfredson; Manuel Gonzales	Ted Thwaites; Bill Wright
Bellhop Detective	August 19 – December 21, 1940	Floyd Gottfredson (story); Merrill de Maris (script)	Floyd Gottfredson	Ted Thwaites; Bill Wright
Land of Long Ago	December 23, 1940 – April 12, 1941	Floyd Gottfredson (story); Merrill de Maris (script)	Floyd Gottfredson	Bill Wright
Love Trouble	April 14 – July 5, 1941	Floyd Gottfredson (story); Merrill de Maris (script)	Floyd Gottfredson	Bill Wright
Mickey Mouse, Supersalesman	July 7 – October 4, 1941	Floyd Gottfredson (story); Merrill de Maris (script)	Floyd Gottfredson	Bill Wright
Mystery at Hidden River	October 6, 1941 – January 17, 1942	Floyd Gottfredson (story); Merrill de Maris (script)	Floyd Gottfredson	Bill Wright
The Gleam	January 19 – May 2, 1942	Floyd Gottfredson (story); Merrill de Maris (script)	Floyd Gottfredson	Ted Thwaites; Bill Wright
Volume 7: March of the Zombies
Goofy and Agnes	May 4 – August 15, 1942	Floyd Gottfredson (story); Merrill de Maris (script)	Floyd Gottfredson	Bill Wright
The Black Crow Mystery	August 17 – November 21, 1942	Floyd Gottfredson (story); Merrill de Maris (script)	Floyd Gottfredson	Bill Wright
Goofy's Car	November 23–28, 1942	Floyd Gottfredson (story); Bob Karp (script)	Floyd Gottfredson	Bill Wright
Working to Win	December 14–23, 1942	Floyd Gottfredson (story); Dick Shaw (script)	Floyd Gottfredson	Bill Wright
Mickey Mouse's Wild Holiday	May 31 – June 26, 1943	Floyd Gottfredson (story); Dick Shaw (script)	Floyd Gottfredson	Dick Moores
The Nazi Submarine	June 28 – July 17, 1943	Bill Walsh	Floyd Gottfredson	Dick Moores
Mickey Mouse on a Secret Mission	July 19 – October 23, 1943	Bill Walsh	Floyd Gottfredson	Dick Moores
The 'Lectro Box	October 25, 1943 – February 5, 1944	Bill Walsh	Floyd Gottfredson	Dick Moores
Pluto the Spy Catcher	February 7–19, 1944	Bill Walsh	Floyd Gottfredson	Dick Moores
The War Orphans	March 13 – April 15, 1944	Bill Walsh	Floyd Gottfredson	Dick Moores
Volume 8: The Tomorrow Wars
The Pirate Ghostship	April 17 – July 15, 1944	Bill Walsh	Floyd Gottfredson	Dick Moores
The World of Tomorrow	July 31 – November 11, 1944	Bill Walsh	Floyd Gottfredson	Dick Moores
The House of Mystery	November 13, 1944 – January 27, 1945	Bill Walsh	Floyd Gottfredson; Paul Murry; Dick Moores	Dick Moores
Billy the Mouse	March 5 – June 16, 1945	Bill Walsh	Floyd Gottfredson	Dick Moores
Mickey's Great-Grandfather	February 25 – March 2, 1946	Bill Walsh	Manuel Gonzales	Bill Wright
Home Made Home	March 4–9, 1946	Bill Walsh	Paul Murry	Bill Wright
The New Girlfriend	March 11–23, 1946	Bill Walsh	Manuel Gonzales; Paul Murry	Bill Wright
Mickey's Mini-Plane	March 25 – April 13, 1946	Bill Walsh	Bill Wright; Manuel Gonzales; Paul Murry; Floyd Gottfredson	Bill Wright
Mystery Next Door	April 15 – May 4, 1946	Bill Walsh	Floyd Gottfredson; Manuel Gonzales	Bill Wright
Gangland	May 6–18, 1946	Bill Walsh	Floyd Gottfredson	Bill Wright
Sunken Treasure	May 20 – June 1, 1946	Bill Walsh	Floyd Gottfredson	Bill Wright
Trailer Trouble	June 3–15, 1946	Bill Walsh	Floyd Gottfredson	Bill Wright
Aunt Marissa	June 17–29, 1946	Bill Walsh	Floyd Gottfredson	Bill Wright
The Candidate	July 1–13, 1946	Bill Walsh	Floyd Gottfredson	Bill Wright
The Little Genius	July 15–27, 1946	Bill Walsh	Floyd Gottfredson	Bill Wright
Volume 9: Rise of the Rhyming Man
Goofy's Boat Race	July 29 – August 10, 1946	Bill Walsh	Floyd Gottfredson	Bill Wright
The Goofy Crooner	August 12–24, 1946	Bill Walsh	Floyd Gottfredson	Bill Wright
Eviction	August 26-September 7, 1946	Bill Walsh	Floyd Gottfredson	Bill Wright
Goofy's Rocket	September 9–21, 1946	Bill Walsh	Floyd Gottfredson	Bill Wright
Mickey's Menagerie	September 23 – October 5, 1946	Bill Walsh	Floyd Gottfredson	Bill Wright
The Cure for Hiccups	October 7–19, 1946	Bill Walsh	Floyd Gottfredson	Bill Wright
Thanksgiving Dinner	October 21 – November 2, 1946	Bill Walsh	Floyd Gottfredson	Bill Wright
The Search for Geeko	November 4–16, 1946	Bill Walsh	Floyd Gottfredson	Bill Wright
The Talking Dog	November 18–30, 1946	Bill Walsh	Floyd Gottfredson	Bill Wright
Arctic Adventure	December 2–14, 1946	Bill Walsh	Floyd Gottfredson	Bill Wright
Morty's Escapade	December 16–28, 1946	Bill Walsh	Floyd Gottfredson	Bill Wright
The Fiendish Cat	December 30, 1946 – January 11, 1947	Bill Walsh	Floyd Gottfredson	Bill Wright
Truant Officer Mickey	January 13–25, 1946	Bill Walsh	Floyd Gottfredson	Bill Wright
Goofy's Inheritance	January 27 – February 8, 1947	Bill Walsh	Floyd Gottfredson	Bill Wright
Mickey the Icky	February 10–22, 1947	Bill Walsh	Floyd Gottfredson	Bill Wright
Pluto's Amnesia	February 24 – March 8, 1947	Bill Walsh	Floyd Gottfredson	Floyd Gottfredson
Pegleg Pete Reforms	March 10–22, 1947	Bill Walsh	Floyd Gottfredson	Floyd Gottfredson
Home Movies	March 24 – April 5, 1947	Bill Walsh	Floyd Gottfredson	Floyd Gottfredson
Shutterbug Mickey	April 7–19, 1947	Bill Walsh	Floyd Gottfredson	Floyd Gottfredson
The Boxer	April 21 – May 3, 1947	Bill Walsh	Floyd Gottfredson	Floyd Gottfredson
Mickey's Strange Flower	May 5–17, 1947	Bill Walsh	Floyd Gottfredson	Floyd Gottfredson
The Midget Racer	May 19–31, 1947	Bill Walsh	Floyd Gottfredson	Floyd Gottfredson
Mickey's Pet Shop	June 2–14, 1947	Bill Walsh	Floyd Gottfredson	Floyd Gottfredson
Mickey's Helicopter	June 16–28, 1947	Bill Walsh	Floyd Gottfredson	Floyd Gottfredson
Pluto's Trial	June 30 – July 12, 1947	Bill Walsh	Floyd Gottfredson	Floyd Gottfredson
The Spook Specialist	July 14–26, 1947	Bill Walsh	Floyd Gottfredson	Floyd Gottfredson
Mickey Writes the Songs	July 28 – August 9, 1947	Bill Walsh	Floyd Gottfredson	Floyd Gottfredson
Horace's Nerves	August 11–23, 1947	Bill Walsh	Floyd Gottfredson	Floyd Gottfredson
The Skyscraper Adventure	August 25 – September 6, 1947	Bill Walsh	Floyd Gottfredson	Floyd Gottfredson
The Foundling	September 6–20, 1947	Bill Walsh	Floyd Gottfredson	Floyd Gottfredson
The Man of Tomorrow	September 22 – December 27, 1947	Bill Walsh	Floyd Gottfredson	Floyd Gottfredson
Mickey Makes a Killing	December 29, 1947 – February 7, 1948	Bill Walsh	Floyd Gottfredson	Floyd Gottfredson
Pflip the Thnuckle-Booh	February 9–28, 1948	Bill Walsh	Floyd Gottfredson	Floyd Gottfredson
The Santa Claus Bandit	March 1 – April 3, 1948	Bill Walsh	Floyd Gottfredson	Floyd Gottfredson
The Kumquat Question	April 5--28, 1948	Bill Walsh	Floyd Gottfredson	Floyd Gottfredson
The Atombrella and the Rhyming Man	May 30 – October 9, 1948	Bill Walsh	Floyd Gottfredson	Floyd Gottfredson
Volume 10: Planet of Faceless Foes
An Education for Eega	October 11 – December 25, 1948	Bill Walsh	Floyd Gottfredson	Floyd Gottfredson
Pflip's Strange Power	December 27, 1948 – March 5, 1949	Bill Walsh	Floyd Gottfredson	Floyd Gottfredson
Planet of the Aints	March 7 – August 6, 1949	Bill Walsh	Floyd Gottfredson	Floyd Gottfredson
Itching Gulch	August 8 – October 22, 1949	Bill Walsh	Floyd Gottfredson	Floyd Gottfredson
The Syndicate of Crime	October 24, 1949 – January 28, 1950	Bill Walsh	Floyd Gottfredson	Floyd Gottfredson
The Moook Treasure	January 30 – July 8, 1950	Bill Walsh	Floyd Gottfredson	Floyd Gottfredson
Mousepotamia	July 10 – September 30, 1950	Bill Walsh	Floyd Gottfredson	Floyd Gottfredson
Land Beneath the Sea	October 2 – December 30, 1950	Bill Walsh	Floyd Gottfredson	Floyd Gottfredson; Bill Wright
Tzig-Tzag Fever	January 1 – March 24, 1951	Bill Walsh	Floyd Gottfredson	Floyd Gottfredson
Volume 11: Mickey vs Mickey
Dry Gulch Goofy	March 26 – June 23, 1951	Bill Walsh	Floyd Gottfredson	Floyd Gottfredson
The Ghost of Black Brian	June 25 – October 20, 1951	Bill Walsh	Floyd Gottfredson	Floyd Gottfredson
Uncle Wombat's Tock-Tock Time Machine	October 22, 1951 – January 22, 1952	Bill Walsh	Floyd Gottfredson	Floyd Gottfredson
The Midas Ring	January 23 – April 19, 1952	Bill Walsh	Floyd Gottfredson	Floyd Gottfredson
Isle of Moola-La	April 21 – October 2, 1952	Bill Walsh	Floyd Gottfredson	Floyd Gottfredson
Hoosat from Another Planet	October 3, 1952 – February 28, 1953	Bill Walsh	Floyd Gottfredson	Floyd Gottfredson
Mickey's Dangerous Double	March 2 – June 20, 1953	Bill Walsh	Floyd Gottfredson	Floyd Gottfredson
Volume 12: The Mysterious Dr. X
The Magic Shoe	June 22 – October 28, 1953	Bill Walsh	Floyd Gottfredson; Bill Wright	Floyd Gottfredson; Bill Wright; Dick Moores
Mickey Takes Umbrage	October 29, 1953 – January 30, 1954	Bill Walsh	Floyd Gottfredson	Floyd Gottfredson
A Fatal Occupation	February 1 – May 15, 1954	Bill Walsh	Floyd Gottfredson	Floyd Gottfredson
The Kid Gang	May 17 – September 18, 1954	Bill Walsh	Floyd Gottfredson	Floyd Gottfredson
Uncle Gudger	September 20 – December 31, 1954	Bill Walsh	Floyd Gottfredson	Floyd Gottfredson
Dr. X	January 1 – May 20, 1955	Bill Walsh	Floyd Gottfredson	Floyd Gottfredson
Pluto's Punctured Romance	May 21 – June 25, 1955	Bill Walsh	Floyd Gottfredson	Floyd Gottfredson; Manuel Gonzales
Li'l Davy	June 27 – October 4, 1955	Bill Walsh	Floyd Gottfredson	Floyd Gottfredson

=== Sunday strips ===
Title	Dates	Writer	Pencils	Inking
Volume 1: Call of the Wild
Dan the Dogcatcher	July 31 – September 4, 1932	Floyd Gottfredson	Floyd Gottfredson	Ted Thwaites
Mickey's Nephews	September 18 – November 6, 1932	Floyd Gottfredson	Floyd Gottfredson	Ted Thwaites
Lair of Wolf Barker	January 29 – June 18, 1933	Ted Osborne	Floyd Gottfredson	Al Taliaferro
Rumplewatt the Giant	March 11 – April 29, 1934	Ted Osborne	Floyd Gottfredson	Ted Thwaites
Tanglefoot Pulls His Weight	May 6 – June 3, 1934	Ted Osborne	Floyd Gottfredson	Ted Thwaites; Al Taliaferro
Dr. Oofgay's Secret Serum	June 17 – September 9, 1934	Ted Osborne	Floyd Gottfredson	Al Taliaferro
Foray to Mt. Fishlake	December 9, 1934 – January 20, 1935	Ted Osborne	Floyd Gottfredson	Ted Thwaites
The Case of the Vanishing Coats	February 17 – March 24, 1935	Ted Osborne	Floyd Gottfredson	Ted Thwaites
Hoppy the Kangaroo	July 28 – November 24, 1935	Ted Osborne	Floyd Gottfredson	Ted Thwaites
Volume 2: Robin Hood Rides Again
Mickey's Rival	January 5–26, 1936	Ted Osborne	Floyd Gottfredson	Ted Thwaites
Helpless Helpers	March 1–22, 1936	Ted Osborne	Floyd Gottfredson	Ted Thwaites; Al Taliaferro
The Robin Hood Adventure	April 26 – October 4, 1936	Floyd Gottfredson (story); Ted Osborne (script)	Floyd Gottfredson	Ted Thwaites; Al Taliaferro
The Ventriloquist	October 11 – November 8, 1936	Ted Osborne	Floyd Gottfredson	Al Taliaferro
Sheriff of Nugget Gulch	May 16 – October 24, 1937	Ted Osborne	Floyd Gottfredson; Al Taliaferro	Al Taliaferro
Service with a Smile	March 6 – April 10, 1938	Merrill de Maris	Floyd Gottfredson; Al Taliaferro	Al Taliaferro
The Brave Little Tailor	August 28 – November 27, 1938	Merrill de Maris	Floyd Gottfredson; Manuel Gonzales	Ted Thwaites

== Reception ==
Professional ratings
Review scores
Source	Rating
PopMatters	9/10 stars
Las Vegas Weekly	4/5 stars

The series was given much praise for its production quality, the quality of the reproduction of the strips, and the extensiveness of the extra material.

=== Awards ===
- 2012
  - Volume one and two of the series won the Eisner award for Best Archival Collection/Project—Strips.
  - The series was nominated for the Harvey Award in the category "Best Domestic Reprint Project".
- 2015
  - Volume five and six of the series were nominated for the Eisner award in the category Best Archival Collection/Project—Strips.

== Related ==
Free Comic Book Day 2011

In 2010 it was announced that Fantagraphics would participate in the promotional campaign Free Comic Book Day in May, 2011. They would release a comic book issue titled Walt Disney's Mickey Mouse featuring a Mickey Mouse story by Floyd Gottfredson. The one storyline included in the issue was Pluto the Racer.

== See also ==
- Donald Duck: The Complete Daily Newspaper Comics
- Donald Duck: The Complete Sunday Comics
- Silly Symphonies: The Complete Disney Classics
- The Complete Carl Barks Disney Library
- The Don Rosa Library
- Walt Disney's Silly Symphonies
