= Donald Duck: The Complete Sunday Comics =

Comic strip reprints collection

Walt Disney's Donald Duck: The Complete Sunday Comics

Publication information
- Publisher: The Library of American Comics
- Schedule: Inconsistent
- Format: Hardcover
- Genre: Funny animals Humour
- Publication date: March 2016
- No. of issues: 2 to date
- Main character(s): Donald Duck, Huey, Dewey and Louie, Daisy Duck, Grandma Duck, Bolivar

Creative team
- Created by: Bob Karp, Al Taliaferro
- Written by: Bob Karp
- Artist: Al Taliaferro
- Penciller: Al Taliaferro
- Inker(s): Al Taliaferro, George Waiss, Karl Karpé, Dick Moores
- Editor: Dean Mullaney

Donald Duck: The Complete Sunday Comics is a series of hardcover books collecting the complete run of Disney's Donald Duck Sunday newspaper comic strip. Drawn by the American comic artist Al Taliaferro, it starts off with the first of Donald Duck's own Sunday strip page from 10 December 1939, after he had first been introduced in the successful Silly Symphony Sunday strip feature as well as in his own daily newspaper strip since 1938. The publisher behind the project is IDW Publishing and their imprint (subdivision), The Library of American Comics. The first book of the series was released in March 2016.

== Format ==
The hardcover books have a sewn binding, sewn linen bookmark and come with a dust jacket. The books measure 12 in × 8.5 in, approximately 305 mm × 216 mm, and are oriented in a landscape view to be able to fit each comic strip as close to their original published size as possible, given the set surface area. Each page accommodates one Sunday strip page.

The print is in full color throughout the book, the Sunday strips were published in full color originally and for these archival volumes the coloring has been recolored and remastered by Digikore Studios for the best possible reproduction. Each volume of the series have about 170 pages and contain around 160 full-color Sunday strips (the equivalent to a little more than three years of an original Sunday newspaper run) as for supplementary material there are introductions included just like in the Donald Duck: The Complete Daily Newspaper Comics from the same publisher. The introduction for the Sunday collection is written by Alberto Becattini.

Volumes of the series are sold separately and have a suggested retail price set by the publisher at $49.99, ten dollars more expensive each compared to a volume of Donald Duck: The Complete Daily Newspaper Comics. According to the publisher, the price increase is due to the restoration and recoloring necessary for the Sunday strips, something that was not needed for the black-and-white daily strips. The publication of the series was apparently discontinued, as no further volumes were published after the two initial ones in 2016.

== Volumes ==
Volumes
Vol.	Release date	Title	Period	Page count	ISBN	Inducks link
1	2016-03-23	Donald Duck: The Complete Sunday Comics 1939-1942	1939-1942	168	978-1-63140-530-3	DDSC 1
2	2016-12-07	Donald Duck: The Complete Sunday Comics 1943-1945	1943-1945	168	978-1-63140-781-9	DDSC 2

=== Upcoming volumes ===
In April 2018, it was announced that the series is on hold due to the publisher prioritizing work on their companion project Donald Duck: The Complete Daily Newspaper Comics.

== See also ==
- Donald Duck: The Complete Daily Newspaper Comics
- Silly Symphonies: The Complete Disney Classics
- Walt Disney's Mickey Mouse
- Walt Disney's Silly Symphonies
