= Mickey Mouse (comic strip) =

1930-1995 American Disney comic strip

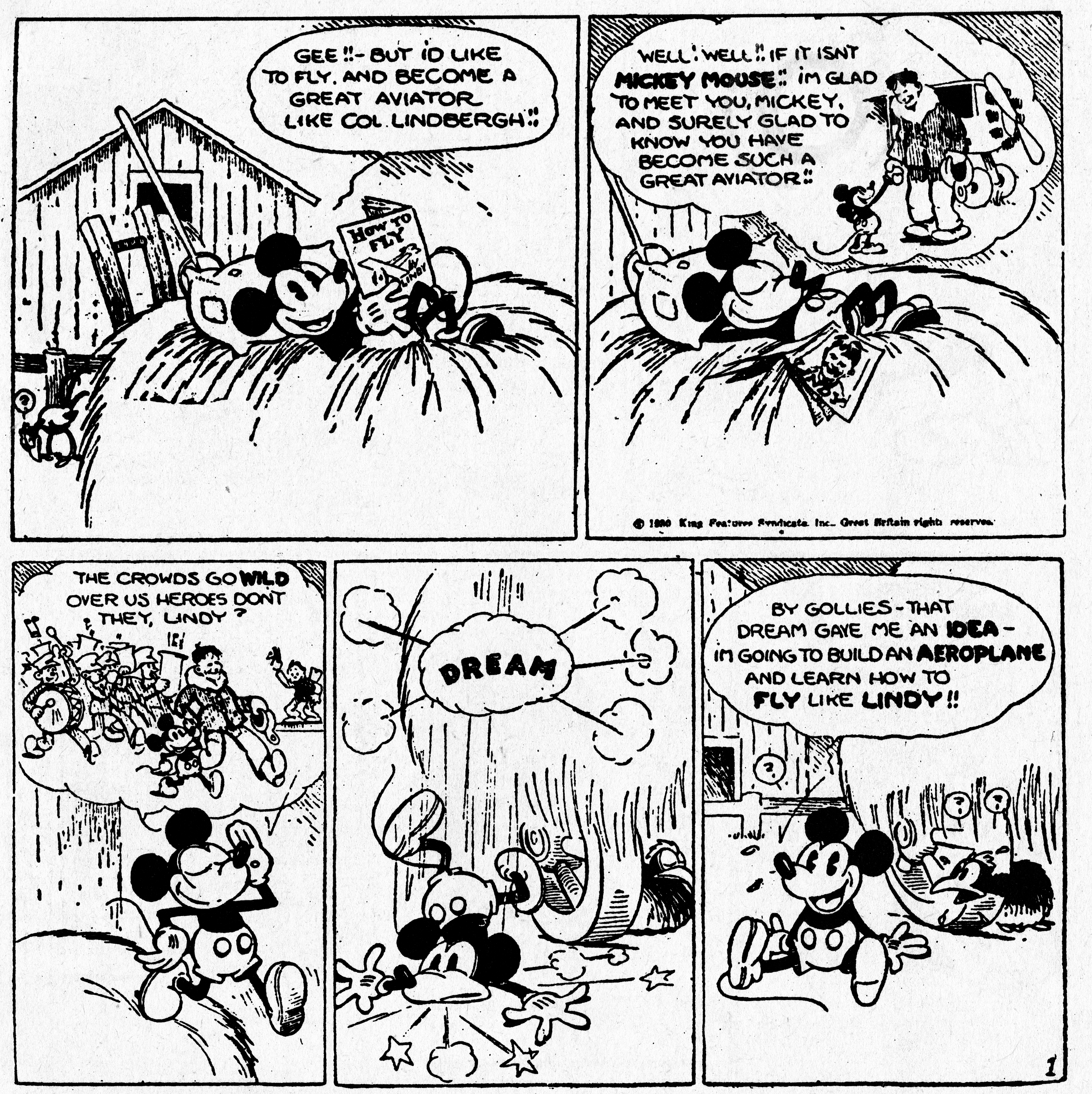
- The first Mickey Mouse strip panels; created by Walt Disney and Ub Iwerks: published January 13, 1930
- Authors: Walt Disney (1930); Win Smith (1930); Floyd Gottfredson (1930–1932); Ted Osborne (1932–1937); Merrill De Maris (1933–1934, 1938–1942); Bill Walsh (1943–1964); Dick Shaw (1964–1969); Del Connell (1969–1988); Floyd Norman; (Sundays: 1984–1986, 1986–1990); Daan Jippes (Sundays only, 1986–1989)
- Illustrators: Ub Iwerks (1930); Win Smith (1930); Floyd Gottfredson; (dailies: May 5, 1930 – November 15, 1975); (Sundays: 1932–1938, 1950–1976); Manuel Gonzales (Sundays: 1939–1981); Bill Wright (Sundays only, 1942–1946, 1956, 1979–1983); Carson Van Osten (1974–1975); Roman Arambula (1975–1989); Daan Jippes (Sundays only, 1981–1982); Rick Hoover (Sundays only, 1989–1995)
- Current status/schedule: Concluded daily and Sunday strips
- Launch date: Daily: January 13, 1930; Sunday: January 10, 1932
- End date: July 29, 1995
- Syndicate: King Features Syndicate
- Genre(s): Humor; Talking animals

Mickey Mouse was an American newspaper comic strip by the Walt Disney Company, featuring the character Mickey Mouse. It is the first published example of Disney comics. The strip debuted on January 13, 1930, and ran until July 29, 1995. It was syndicated by King Features Syndicate until 1990, when Disney switched to Creators Syndicate, which distributed the strip until 2014 (in reruns after 1995).

The early installments were written by Walt Disney, with art by Ub Iwerks and Win Smith. Beginning with the May 5, 1930, strip, the art chores were taken up by Floyd Gottfredson (often aided by various inkers), who also either wrote or supervised the story continuities until 1943 (relying on various writers to flesh out his plots). Starting in 1943, Bill Walsh became the comic's sole writer, with Gottfredson continuing to provide art. Gottfredson continued with the strip until 1975.

By 1931, the Mickey Mouse strip was published in 60 newspapers in the US, as well as papers in twenty other countries. Starting in 1940, strips were reprinted in the monthly comic book Walt Disney's Comics and Stories, and since then Gottfredson reprints have become a staple of Disney comics publishing around the world.

Walt Disney's Mickey Mouse, a definitive collection of Gottfredson's work, was published by Fantagraphics Books from 2011 to 2018. There are fourteen volumes in the set—twelve books of the daily strips from 1930 to 1955, and two volumes of Gottfredson's Sunday pages from 1932 to 1938.

== Development ==
=== Early days ===
A Mickey Mouse comic strip was suggested by Joseph Connolly, the president of King Features Syndicate, in a July 24, 1929 letter to Disney animator Ub Iwerks: "I think your mouse animation is one of the funniest features I have ever seen in the movies. Please consider producing one in comic strip form for newspapers. If you can find time to do one, I shall be very interested in seeing some specimens." The Disney team was busy producing new cartoons, but by November, samples of the new strip were approved by the syndicate. The comic strip launched on January 13, 1930, written by Disney himself, with art by Ub Iwerks.

The strip begins with young Mickey as an optimistic, imaginative young mouse living on a farm, and dreaming of becoming a great aviator like his hero, Charles Lindbergh. In a sequence based on the 1928 short Plane Crazy, Mickey puts together a homemade plane, and takes a flight with his girlfriend Minnie. She falls out of the plane, and Mickey travels through a storm to land on a deserted island, inhabited by fierce natives who want to cook him alive.

As these first strips were being released in January 1930, Iwerks left the Disney studio, signing a contract with Disney competitor Pat Powers to leave Disney and start an animation studio under his own name. Win Smith, who had been inking the strips, took over the pencilling as well with the February 10th strip. Smith left the studio in April after a fight with Disney, who wanted him to take over writing the strip. As a "temporary replacement", Disney asked a young inbetweener at the studio named Floyd Gottfredson to fill in. Gottfredson's first strip was published on May 5, and he took over the scripting two weeks later. He would continue as the creative force of the strip for more than 45 years.

While the early months of the strip did have a loose plot, the pace and style were still the standard gag-a-day approach to comic strips. With adventure and daily continuity strips like The Gumps and Wash Tubbs becoming increasingly popular, King Features Syndicate asked Disney to make Mickey Mouse a more serious adventure strip.

This led to the first adventure storyline, "Mickey Mouse in Death Valley", which ran from April 1 to September 20, 1930. The story—begun by Smith, and continued by Gottfredson—involves a crooked lawyer, Sylvester Shyster, and his thuggish associate Peg-Leg Pete, who kidnap Minnie in order to find a map to her Uncle Mortimer's hidden gold mine in Death Valley. Mickey and Minnie race Shyster and Pete to the desert, to lay claim to the mine. The story runs through a number of Western melodrama tropes—a desperate horse chase, gunplay, a crusty old sheriff, the heroine getting locked up in a jail cell, the hero unfairly branded an outlaw. Over six months, Gottfredson made it clear that Mickey Mouse could deliver action and thrills.

The next story, "Mr. Slicker and the Egg Robbers", included a sequence in which Mickey, convinced that Minnie has thrown him over for a rival, spends a week attempting suicide. He tries shooting, gassing, drowning and hanging himself, before he decides that he's overreacting and gives up on the idea.

=== 1930s ===
In a 1931 publicity stunt, Mickey—just crowned boxing champion in the strip—had his photograph taken, and then encouraged readers to send a stamped, addressed envelope to him care of the newspaper to get a copy. Gottfredson painted a "photo" that was printed on cards and sent out to the readers. According to a Disney press release, they received more than 20,000 requests for the picture, demonstrating the strength of the strip's appeal.

An early 1932 story, "The Great Orphanage Robbery", is seen as a milestone in Gottfredson's increasingly sophisticated storytelling. To raise money for an orphans' home, Mickey and friends stage a production of Uncle Tom's Cabin, but when the play is over, they discover that the money has been stolen. The thieves are Shyster and Pete, returning to the strip after a year and a half, but they manage to place the blame on Mickey's friend Horace Horsecollar, who's thrown in jail. Mickey chases after the villains, but his disappearance puts suspicion onto him as well. In the second volume of the 2011 reprint collection, comics historian Thomas Andrae describes the resulting storyline:

Gottfredson's newfound mastery of the serial format is evident in nearly every strip of "Orphanage Robbery". First we are enticed into the story by following Mickey's attempt each day to increase the running total for the orphans' fund. Then the suspense increases through the use of an exciting chase -- conveniently supplied by [1932 Mickey short] The Klondike Kid -- as well as cross-cutting techniques developed from old movie serials, another influence Gottfredson now learned to mimic with ease. The strip cuts back and forth between the trial, conviction, and near-execution of Horace Horsecollar -- who is falsely accused of the theft -- and Mickey's progress in tracking down the villains.

The first Sunday page appeared on January 10, 1932, and was aimed at a younger audience, as most Sunday comic strips were at the time. In September 1932, Mrs. Fieldmouse saddled Mickey with baby-sitting her two pesky twins, Morty and Ferdie, who kept his house in an uproar for two months' worth of strips. They called him "Unca' Mickey", although they didn't seem to be actual relations, but when they returned in March 1935 for another Sunday continuity, they were indeed Mickey's nephews.

Other memorable early-1930s storylines include 1932-33's "Blaggard Castle", in which Mickey and Horace are captured and hypnotized by the mad scientists Professor Ecks, Professor Doublex and Professor Triplex, and 1933's "The Mail Pilot", where Mickey finds Shyster and Pete once again, ruling a secret zeppelin kingdom in the clouds.

Mickey's best pal Goofy joined the strip in January 1933—still using the proto-Goofy moniker "Dippy Dawg"—and by the end of the year, he went into business with Mickey as detectives in "The Crazy Crime Wave", investigating the mysterious city-wide thefts of hair and red flannel underwear. The character appeared in several stories as Dippy, until January 1936, when he's called "Goofy" for the first time in the strip.

Donald Duck first appeared in the Sunday pages in February 1935, where he got Mickey involved in "The Case of the Missing Coats" and then stuck around to fight with Morty and Ferdie. In March 1935's "Editor-in-Grief", the brash duck was hired as a newsboy, selling Mickey's crusading newspaper, The Daily War-Drum. He returned to the strip in fall 1936 for "The Seven Ghosts", helping Mickey and Goofy investigate a haunted mansion. This would be his last appearance in the Mickey Mouse strip—starting in August 1936, Donald was the star of a year-long sequence in the Sunday Silly Symphony comic strip, and he got his own comic strip in 1938. Since Mickey and Donald could appear in rival newspapers, the characters weren't allowed to cross over to the other's strip.

Another well-remembered 1930s story is Mickey Mouse Outwits the Phantom Blot, published from May to September 1939. In this story, Chief O'Hara hires Mickey to capture a new criminal who calls himself the Blot. According to O'Hara, he is the smartest thief they've ever met, but Detective Casey calls this new criminal a looney. The only thing he steals is cameras of a special type and he smashes them open on the spot. (The strange crime and the motive behind it resembles closely the Sherlock Holmes story "The Adventure of the Six Napoleons".) The crime appears eccentric, but the villain is deadly serious—three times during the story, he captures Mickey and leaves him in deadly peril, and the pair engage in a car chase, a boat chase and a battle for control of a crashing airplane. In the end, the Blot is captured and unmasked. The character was dubbed "the Phantom Blot" in 1941, when the strips were reprinted in Dell Comics' Four Color (1st series) issue #16, Mickey Mouse Outwits the Phantom Blot. The name stuck, and the character has been the Phantom Blot ever since.

In the Sunday pages from August to November 1938, Mickey performed in an adaptation of the current short cartoon Brave Little Tailor, bookended with segments showing him as an actor, being cast in the film by Walt Disney. This was Gottfredson's last work on the Sunday strip. At that point, Manuel Gonzales took over as the lead artist on the Mickey Sundays, and stayed in the post until 1981 (except for his military service during World War II, from 1942 to 1945). Gonzales and writer Merrill De Maris continued writing the occasional multi-week story, with an especially long four-month continuity from March to July 1940, "The Photographic Exhibition." The final Sunday story, "The Professor's Experiment", ran from November 1943 to March 1944. (This also happened to be the last appearance of Mickey's nephew Ferdie in the strip; from 1944 on, Ferdie's twin Morty always appeared alone.) At its peak the Sunday strip, "... appeared in 120 newspapers around the world with a collective circulation of more than 20 million readers each week."

=== 1940s ===
Gottfredson stopped plotting the strip in June 1943, passing it on to Disney press agent Bill Walsh, who wrote the strip for the next twenty years. Walsh's first two stories were about fighting the Axis; the second one, Mickey Mouse on a Secret Mission, enraged Adolf Hitler so much that he demanded Benito Mussolini stop Italians from publishing the Topolino (Mickey Mouse) comic magazine.

As Walsh was not interested in Mickey Mouse as a character, and had a taste for science-fiction, mystery and horror, his stories quickly diverged from those of the previous decade. Walsh created various bizarre characters and made Mickey's antagonists darker and deadlier. In The 'Lectro Box (Oct 1943-Feb 1944), Mickey and nephew Morty create a powerful and unpredictable machine, which soon attracts the monstrous mad scientist Dr. Grut and his posse of mind-controlled Aberzombies. A few months later, Mickey, Minnie and Pluto visited The World of Tomorrow (July-Nov 1944), where Pegleg Pete ruled the world with his deadly robots, the Mekka Men. The next story, The House of Mystery (Nov 1944-Jan 1945), had the evil scientist Drusilla die in a fire as her mansion burns around her, and her caretaker rushes inside to be with her in the flames. At this point, the threat of death became a real presence in the strip.

In mid-1945, the daily strip moved to a mostly gag-a-day format, with brief two-week continuities through the summer of 1947. In September 1947, the strip returned to long continuities and introduced a new character: Eega Beeva, "the Man of Tomorrow". Eega was a strange creature from five hundred years in the future, a highly evolved human who understood future technology and possessed mysterious powers. He had a strange future accent that added a P to the beginning of most words: "I pdon't pthink so!" He was joined in February by his pet Pflip the Thnuckle-Booh, and became Mickey's sidekick for the next few years, returning to his home in the future in July 1950, at the end of "The Moook Treasure".

On a Sunday page in October 1949, Goofy bought a talkative, self-centered mynah bird named Ellsworth. Also created by Walsh, Ellsworth was a major focus of the Sunday strip for ten years, sometimes crowding Mickey out of his own strip. He also appeared in the daily strip in 1956, once the dailies became gag-focused as well.

=== 1950s and beyond ===
The daily strip took a darker turn in the early 1950s. Alberto Becattini says, "Especially after Eega Beeva left, Mickey found himself unwillingly mixed up in dangerous adventures whose development and outcome he no longer seemed to be able to control." Goofy, who had been fairly absent from the daily strip during Eega Beeva's tenure, returned to the strip in March 1951 with "Dry Gulch Goofy", a story in which he becomes a Hollywood actor.

In mid-1955, King Features Syndicate asked Gottfredson and Walsh to stop writing continuities and become a gag-a-day strip; they were concerned that TV serials were making the audience lose interest in adventure comic strips. Walsh continued to write the daily strip until 1964.

Notable supporting characters from the gag-a-day strip include Morty's friend Alvin (1956–75), his girlfriend Millie (1962–87), Doctor Proctor (1966–89), and Goofy's girlfriend Glory-Bee (1969–79), who also appeared in Disney comic books in the early 70s.

== Creators ==
Gottfredson originally wrote and drew the Mickey Mouse strip by himself, but scaled back in 1932, only plotting the stories and doing the penciling, while the dialogue was mostly done by other hands. The stories were always untitled; titles were usually assigned later, when the strips were reprinted in picture books or comic books. Scripts were written by Webb Smith (1932–33), Ted Osborne (1933–38), Merrill De Maris (1933–42), Dick Shaw (1942–43), Bill Walsh (1943–64), Roy Williams (1962–69) and Del Connell (1968–88). Even so, Gottfredson always worked closely with his writers, and would often suggest changes in the scripts whenever he thought it would improve a story. There were a variety of inkers on the strip through the years; inkers for the Sunday strips included Al Taliaferro (1932–1938) and Ted Thwaites (1932–1940), and Manuel Gonzales until 1981; Taliaferro also inked daily strips. Gottfredson returned to inking daily strips himself in February 1947; Frank Reilly took over as head of the Comic Strip Department, and Gottfredson had more time to devote to the strip.

Gottfredson plotted the continuities until Bill Walsh started writing the strip in 1943. Around that time, Dick Moores inked the strip for two years. Starting in the 1950s, Gottfredson and writer Bill Walsh were instructed to drop the storylines and do only daily gags. Gottfredson continued illustrating the daily strip until his retirement on October 1, 1975.

After Gottfredson retired, the strip was written by Del Connell (1968–1988), Floyd Norman (1984–1992) and Colette Bezio (1991–1995). Roman Arambula was the principal artist on the daily strip from 1975 to early 1990 (and even lettered it). Writer Mark Evanier described Arambula's work habits on the strip thus: "He would draw two weeks worth of the strip every other week and in the weeks he wasn't working on that, he drew comics for me."

Upon the retirement of Manuel Gonzales in 1981, Daan Jippes took over the Sunday strip (May 3, 1981 – January 3, 1982). Mike Royer provided most of the inking. From 1983 to 1990, Arambula took on the art chores of the Sunday strip in addition to the daily.

Arambula had occasional fill-in artists, "... which [he] would have told you was not because he ever missed a deadline". These included Manuel Gonzales (1975–1981), Tony Strobl (1975–1981), Steve Steere (1981–1982), Bill Wright (1982–1984), Bill Langley (1984–1987), Jules Coenen (1986–1987) and Larry Mayer (1986–1987). In the later years of the strip, art duties were shared by Alex Howell (1990–1995), Rick Hoover (1991–1995) and Thomas Lewis (1994–1995).

The Sunday page went into reprints on April 21, 1991. By 1994, the strip was running in only 30 newspapers, and Disney and King Features decided to discontinue it. The daily strip ended on July 29, 1995.

== Inspirations ==
The first two weeks of Mickey Mouse strips in 1930 were loosely based on the 1928 short Plane Crazy, followed by a sequence in the jungle, inspired by the 1929 short Jungle Rhythm. When Floyd Gottfredson took over, he also took inspiration from Disney's animation department, who provided him with storyboards and model sheets for upcoming Mickey Mouse shorts.

- "The Great Orphanage Robbery" (1932) was partly inspired by Mickey's Mellerdrammer (1933) and The Klondike Kid (1932), but with a more elaborate plot.
- "Blaggard Castle" (1932–33) was inspired by The Mad Doctor (1933), and by Boris Karloff's character in the 1932 film The Old Dark House.
- "Mickey Mouse and His Horse Tanglefoot" (1933) was an adaptation of The Steeple Chase (1933).
- "Rumplewatt the Giant" (1934) was an adaptation of Giantland (1933).
- "The Captive Castaways" (1934) was inspired by Shanghaied (1934).
- "The Case of the Vanishing Coats" (1935) was inspired by The Invisible Man (1935), a never-finished cartoon.
- "Hoppy the Kangaroo" (1935) was based on Mickey's Kangaroo (1935).
- "Mickey's Rival" (1936) uses the antagonist Mortimer Mouse from the Mickey's Rival short (1936).
- "The Robin Hood Adventure" (1936) was partly inspired by Mickey's Garden (1935) and The Worm Turns (1937).
- "The Seven Ghosts" (1936) was inspired by a work-in-progress version of Lonesome Ghosts (1937); at the time that the comic was developed, the ghosts were mortal villains in costume, rather than actual ghosts as in the finished film.
- "Mighty Whale Hunter" (1938) was inspired by The Whalers (1938).
- "The Brave Little Tailor" (1938) is an explicit adaptation of the newly released short Brave Little Tailor (1938).
- "Society Dog Show" (1939) is an explicit adaptation of the newly released short Society Dog Show (1939).
- "Mickey Mouse Meets Robinson Crusoe" (1938–39) makes references to Mickey's Man Friday (1935).
- "Li'l Davy" (1955) features a diminutive version of Davy Crockett, following the popular Davy Crockett miniseries from the Disneyland TV show (1954–55).

== Characters ==
Recurring characters in the strip include:

- Mickey Mouse: A young, bold, optimistic mouse, who loves excitement and adventure.
- Minnie Mouse: Mickey's girlfriend, a warm-hearted and stubborn mouse. Introduced in the first week of the strip, January 1930.
- Clarabelle Cow: Mickey and Minnie's talkative and stubborn friend. Introduced in "Mickey Mouse in Death Valley", April 1930.
- Horace Horsecollar: Mickey and Minnie's cheerful know-it-all friend. Introduced in "Mickey Mouse in Death Valley", April 1930.
- Pluto: Mickey's faithful dog. Introduced in "Pluto the Pup", July 1931.
- Goofy: Mickey's loyal, dimwitted best friend. Introduced as "Dippy Dog" in January 1933.
- Peg-Leg Pete: Mickey Mouse's nemesis, a tough gangster who often works with Sylvester Shyster. Introduced in "Mickey Mouse in Death Valley", April 1930.
- Sylvester Shyster: A sneaky lawyer behind a number of villainous schemes. Introduced in "Mickey Mouse in Death Valley", April 1930.
- The Phantom Blot: A nefarious hooded villain who first appeared in "Mickey Mouse Outwits the Phantom Blot" in May 1939. The mysterious Blot never returned in Gottfredson's strip, but the character has resurfaced many times over the years, starting with a 1955 story in the Italian Topolino, a 1964 three-part serial in Walt Disney's Comics and Stories, and then his own comic, published by Gold Key Comics for 7 issues from 1964 to 1966.
- Butch: A roughneck who started as a gangster in "Mr. Slicker and the Egg Robbers" in November 1930, but stuck around and became Mickey's pal for a year, exiting the strip after "Circus Roustabout" in June 1931. The character was revived in the 1990s as a member of Mickey's supporting cast in European Disney comics.
- Professors Ecks, Doublex and Triplex: Three terrifying mad scientists who first menaced Mickey Mouse in "Blaggard Castle", November 1932 to February 1933. The professors returned as "reformed" characters in Italian comics in the 1970s, and came back to the Mickey Mouse strip as villains in the June 1990 story "The Time Transmuter".
- Tanglefoot: Mickey's broken-down but loyal horse. Introduced in "Mickey Mouse and His Horse Tanglefoot", June 1933. The horse character returned in two more stories -- "The Crazy Crime Wave" and "Tanglefoot Pulls His Weight"—and was so popular that Western Publishing released six Big Little Books in 1934 related to Tanglefoot.

From the beginning, the strips were parts of long continuing stories. These introduced characters such as the Phantom Blot, Eega Beeva, and the Bat Bandit, which Gottfredson created; Disney created Eli Squinch, Mickey's nephews, Morty and Ferdie Fieldmouse, and Sylvester Shyster, which were also introduced in the comic.

== Storylines ==
Mickey Mouse had adventure storylines from its inception until October 1955, when the syndicate instructed the creators to move to a simpler, gag-a-day format. In 1990, the daily strip returned to the adventure format.

=== Daily strips (1930–1955) ===
The headings in the table below refer to the Fantagraphics Books reprint collections, Walt Disney's Mickey Mouse.

Title	Year	Date	Writer	Pencils	Inking
Volume 1: Race to Death Valley
Lost on a Desert Island	1930	January 13-March 31	Walt Disney	Ub Iwerks; Win Smith	Win Smith
Mickey Mouse in Death Valley	1930	April 1-September 20	Walt Disney; Floyd Gottfredson	Win Smith; Floyd Gottfredson; Jack King	Win Smith; Floyd Gottfredson; Roy Nelson; Hardie Gramatky
Mr. Slicker and the Egg Robbers	1930	September 22-December 29	Floyd Gottfredson	Floyd Gottfredson	Floyd Gottfredson; Hardie Gramatky; Earl Duvall
Mickey Mouse Music	1931	December 30, 1930 – January 3	Floyd Gottfredson	Earl Duvall	Earl Duvall
The Picnic	1931	January 5–10	Floyd Gottfredson	Floyd Gottfredson	Earl Duvall
Traffic Troubles	1931	January 12–17	Floyd Gottfredson	Earl Duvall; Floyd Gottfredson	Earl Duvall
Mickey Mouse vs. Kat Nipp	1931	January 19-February 25	Floyd Gottfredson	Floyd Gottfredson; Earl Duvall	Earl Duvall
Mickey Mouse, Boxing Champion	1931	February 26-April 29	Floyd Gottfredson	Earl Duvall; Floyd Gottfredson	Earl Duvall; Al Taliaferro
High Society	1931	April 30-May 30	Floyd Gottfredson	Floyd Gottfredson	Al Taliaferro
Circus Roustabout	1931	June 1-July 7	Floyd Gottfredson	Floyd Gottfredson	Al Taliaferro
Pluto the Pup	1931	July 8–18	Floyd Gottfredson	Floyd Gottfredson	Al Taliaferro
Mickey Mouse and the Ransom Plot	1931	July 20-November 7	Floyd Gottfredson	Floyd Gottfredson	Al Taliaferro
Fireman Mickey	1931	November 9-December 5	Floyd Gottfredson	Floyd Gottfredson	Al Taliaferro
Clarabelle's Boarding House	1931-1932	December 7 – January 9	Floyd Gottfredson	Floyd Gottfredson	Al Taliaferro
Volume 2: Trapped on Treasure Island
The Great Orphanage Robbery	1932	January 11-May 14	Floyd Gottfredson	Floyd Gottfredson	Al Taliaferro
Mickey Mouse Sails for Treasure Island	1932	May 16-November 12	Floyd Gottfredson	Floyd Gottfredson	Al Taliaferro; Ted Thwaites
Blaggard Castle	1932-1933	November 14 – February 10	Floyd Gottfredson (story); Webb Smith (script)	Floyd Gottfredson	Ted Thwaites
Pluto and the Dogcatcher	1933	February 11–25	Floyd Gottfredson (story); Ted Osborne (script)	Floyd Gottfredson	Ted Thwaites
The Mail Pilot	1933	February 27-June 10	Floyd Gottfredson (story); Ted Osborne (script)	Floyd Gottfredson	Ted Thwaites
Mickey Mouse and His Horse Tanglefoot	1933	June 12-October 7	Floyd Gottfredson (story); Ted Osborne (script)	Floyd Gottfredson	Ted Thwaites
The Crazy Crime Wave	1933-1934	October 9 – January 9	Floyd Gottfredson (story); Merrill de Maris (script)	Floyd Gottfredson	Ted Thwaites
Volume 3: High Noon at Inferno Gulch
The Captive Castaways	1934	January 10-April 17	Floyd Gottfredson (story); Merrill de Maris (script)	Floyd Gottfredson	Ted Thwaites
Pluto's Rival	1934	April 18–28	Floyd Gottfredson (story); Ted Osborne (script)	Floyd Gottfredson	Ted Thwaites
The Bat Bandit of Inferno Gulch	1934	April 30-July 28	Floyd Gottfredson (story); Ted Osborne (script)	Floyd Gottfredson	Ted Thwaites
Bobo the Elephant	1934	July 30-October 13	Floyd Gottfredson (story); Ted Osborne (script)	Floyd Gottfredson	Ted Thwaites
The Sacred Jewel	1934	October 15-December 29	Floyd Gottfredson (story); Ted Osborne (script)	Floyd Gottfredson	Ted Thwaites
Pluto the Racer	1934-1935	December 31 – March 2	Floyd Gottfredson (story); Ted Osborne (script)	Floyd Gottfredson	Ted Thwaites
Editor-in-Grief	1935	March 4-June 1	Floyd Gottfredson (story); Ted Osborne (script)	Floyd Gottfredson	Ted Thwaites
Race for Riches	1935	June 3-September 28	Floyd Gottfredson (story); Ted Osborne (script)	Floyd Gottfredson	Ted Thwaites
The Pirate Submarine	1935-1936	September 30 – January 4	Floyd Gottfredson (story); Ted Osborne (script)	Floyd Gottfredson	Ted Thwaites
Volume 4: House of the Seven Haunts!
Oscar the Ostrich	1936	January 6-March 21	Floyd Gottfredson (story); Ted Osborne (script)	Floyd Gottfredson	Ted Thwaites
Mickey Mouse Joins the Foreign Legion	1936	March 23-August 8	Floyd Gottfredson (story); Ted Osborne (script)	Floyd Gottfredson	Ted Thwaites
The Seven Ghosts	1936	August 10-November 28	Floyd Gottfredson (story); Ted Osborne (script)	Floyd Gottfredson	Ted Thwaites
Island in the Sky	1936-1937	November 30 – April 3	Floyd Gottfredson (story); Ted Osborne (script)	Floyd Gottfredson	Ted Thwaites
In Search of Jungle Treasure	1937	April 5-August 7	Floyd Gottfredson (story); Ted Osborne (script)	Floyd Gottfredson	Ted Thwaites
Monarch of Medioka	1937-1938	August 9 – February 5	Floyd Gottfredson (story); Ted Osborne (script)	Floyd Gottfredson	Al Taliaferro; Ted Thwaites
Volume 5: Mickey Mouse Outwits the Phantom Blot
Mighty Whale Hunter	1938	February 7-July 6	Floyd Gottfredson (story); Merrill de Maris (script)	Floyd Gottfredson	Ted Thwaites; Bill Wright
The Plumber's Helper	1938	July 7-December 10	Floyd Gottfredson (story); Merrill de Maris (script)	Floyd Gottfredson	Ted Thwaites; Bill Wright
Mickey Mouse Meets Robinson Crusoe	1938-1939	December 12 – April 13	Floyd Gottfredson (story); Merrill de Maris (script)	Floyd Gottfredson	Ted Thwaites; Bill Wright
Unhappy Campers	1939	April 14-May 20	Floyd Gottfredson (story); Merrill de Maris (script)	Floyd Gottfredson; Ross Wetzel	Ted Thwaites; Bill Wright
Mickey Mouse Outwits the Phantom Blot	1939	May 22-September 9	Floyd Gottfredson (story); Merrill de Maris (script)	Floyd Gottfredson	Ted Thwaites; Bill Wright
The Miracle Master	1939-1940	September 11 – January 13	Floyd Gottfredson (story); Merrill de Maris (script)	Floyd Gottfredson	Ted Thwaites; Bill Wright
An Education for Thursday	1940	January 15-April 20	Floyd Gottfredson (story); Merrill de Maris (script)	Floyd Gottfredson	Ted Thwaites; Bill Wright
Volume 6: Lost in Lands of Long Ago
The Bar-None Ranch	1940	April 22-August 17	Floyd Gottfredson (story); Manuel Gonzales (story); Merrill de Maris (script)	Floyd Gottfredson; Manuel Gonzales	Ted Thwaites; Bill Wright
Bellhop Detective	1940	August 19-December 21	Floyd Gottfredson (story); Merrill de Maris (script)	Floyd Gottfredson	Ted Thwaites; Bill Wright
Land of Long Ago	1940-1941	December 23– April 12	Floyd Gottfredson (story); Merrill de Maris (script)	Floyd Gottfredson	Bill Wright
Love Trouble	1941	April 14-July 5	Floyd Gottfredson (story); Merrill de Maris (script)	Floyd Gottfredson	Bill Wright
Mickey Mouse, Supersalesman	1941	July 7-October 4	Floyd Gottfredson (story); Merrill de Maris (script)	Floyd Gottfredson	Bill Wright
Mystery at Hidden River	1941-1942	October 6 – January 17	Floyd Gottfredson (story); Merrill de Maris (script)	Floyd Gottfredson	Bill Wright
The Gleam	1942	January 19-May 2	Floyd Gottfredson (story); Merrill de Maris (script)	Floyd Gottfredson	Ted Thwaites; Bill Wright
Volume 7: March of the Zombies
Goofy and Agnes	1942	May 4-August 15	Floyd Gottfredson (story); Merrill de Maris (script)	Floyd Gottfredson	Bill Wright
The Black Crow Mystery	1942	August 17-November 21	Floyd Gottfredson (story); Merrill de Maris (script)	Floyd Gottfredson	Bill Wright
Goofy's Car	1942	November 23–28	Floyd Gottfredson (story); Bob Karp (script)	Floyd Gottfredson	Bill Wright
Working to Win	1942	December 14–23	Floyd Gottfredson (story); Dick Shaw (script)	Floyd Gottfredson	Bill Wright
Mickey Mouse's Wild Holiday	1943	May 31-June 26	Floyd Gottfredson (story); Dick Shaw (script)	Floyd Gottfredson	Dick Moores
The Nazi Submarine	1943	June 28-July 17	Bill Walsh	Floyd Gottfredson	Dick Moores
Mickey Mouse on a Secret Mission	1943	July 19-October 23	Bill Walsh	Floyd Gottfredson	Dick Moores
The 'Lectro Box	1943-1944	October 25 – February 5	Bill Walsh	Floyd Gottfredson	Dick Moores
Pluto the Spy Catcher	1944	February 7–19	Bill Walsh	Floyd Gottfredson	Dick Moores
The War Orphans	1944	March 13-April 15	Bill Walsh	Floyd Gottfredson	Dick Moores
Volume 8: The Tomorrow Wars
The Pirate Ghostship	1944	April 17-July 15	Bill Walsh	Floyd Gottfredson	Dick Moores
The World of Tomorrow	1944	July 31-November 11	Bill Walsh	Floyd Gottfredson	Dick Moores
The House of Mystery	1944-1945	November 13 – January 27	Bill Walsh	Floyd Gottfredson; Paul Murry; Dick Moores	Dick Moores
Billy the Mouse	1945	March 5-June 16	Bill Walsh	Floyd Gottfredson	Dick Moores
Mickey's Great-Grandfather	1946	February 25-March 2	Bill Walsh	Manuel Gonzales	Bill Wright
Home Made Home	1946	March 4–9	Bill Walsh	Paul Murry	Bill Wright
The New Girlfriend	1946	March 11–23	Bill Walsh	Manuel Gonzales; Paul Murry	Bill Wright
Mickey's Mini-Plane	1946	March 25-April 13	Bill Walsh	Bill Wright; Manuel Gonzales; Paul Murry; Floyd Gottfredson	Bill Wright
Mystery Next Door	1946	April 15-May 4	Bill Walsh	Floyd Gottfredson; Manuel Gonzales	Bill Wright
Gangland	1946	May 6–18	Bill Walsh	Floyd Gottfredson	Bill Wright
Sunken Treasure	1946	May 20-June 1	Bill Walsh	Floyd Gottfredson	Bill Wright
Trailer Trouble	1946	June 3–15	Bill Walsh	Floyd Gottfredson	Bill Wright
Aunt Marissa	1946	June 17–29	Bill Walsh	Floyd Gottfredson	Bill Wright
The Candidate	1946	July 1–13	Bill Walsh	Floyd Gottfredson	Bill Wright
The Little Genius	1946	July 15–27	Bill Walsh	Floyd Gottfredson	Bill Wright
Volume 9: Rise of the Rhyming Man
Goofy's Boat Race	1946	July 29-August 10	Bill Walsh	Floyd Gottfredson	Bill Wright
The Goofy Crooner	1946	August 12–24	Bill Walsh	Floyd Gottfredson	Bill Wright
Eviction	1946	August 26-September 7	Bill Walsh	Floyd Gottfredson	Bill Wright
Goofy's Rocket	1946	September 9–21	Bill Walsh	Floyd Gottfredson	Bill Wright
Mickey's Menagerie	1946	September 23-October 5	Bill Walsh	Floyd Gottfredson	Bill Wright
The Cure for Hiccups	1946	October 7–19	Bill Walsh	Floyd Gottfredson	Bill Wright
Thanksgiving Dinner	1946	October 21-November 2	Bill Walsh	Floyd Gottfredson	Bill Wright
The Search for Geeko	1946	November 4–16	Bill Walsh	Floyd Gottfredson	Bill Wright
The Talking Dog	1946	November 18–30	Bill Walsh	Floyd Gottfredson	Bill Wright
Arctic Adventure	1946	December 2–14	Bill Walsh	Floyd Gottfredson	Bill Wright
Morty's Escapade	1946	December 16–28	Bill Walsh	Floyd Gottfredson	Bill Wright
The Fiendish Cat	1946-1947	December 30– January 11	Bill Walsh	Floyd Gottfredson	Bill Wright
Truant Officer Mickey	1947	January 13–25	Bill Walsh	Floyd Gottfredson	Bill Wright
Goofy's Inheritance	1947	January 27-February 8	Bill Walsh	Floyd Gottfredson	Bill Wright
Mickey the Icky	1947	February 10–22	Bill Walsh	Floyd Gottfredson	Bill Wright
Pluto's Amnesia	1947	February 24-March 8	Bill Walsh	Floyd Gottfredson	Floyd Gottfredson
Pegleg Pete Reforms	1947	March 10–22	Bill Walsh	Floyd Gottfredson	Floyd Gottfredson
Home Movies	1947	March 24-April 5	Bill Walsh	Floyd Gottfredson	Floyd Gottfredson
Shutterbug Mickey	1947	April 7–19	Bill Walsh	Floyd Gottfredson	Floyd Gottfredson
The Boxer	1947	April 21-May 3	Bill Walsh	Floyd Gottfredson	Floyd Gottfredson
Mickey's Strange Flower	1947	May 5–17	Bill Walsh	Floyd Gottfredson	Floyd Gottfredson
The Midget Racer	1947	May 19–31	Bill Walsh	Floyd Gottfredson	Floyd Gottfredson
Mickey's Pet Shop	1947	June 2–14	Bill Walsh	Floyd Gottfredson	Floyd Gottfredson
Mickey's Helicopter	1947	June 16–28	Bill Walsh	Floyd Gottfredson	Floyd Gottfredson
Pluto's Trial	1947	June 30-July 12	Bill Walsh	Floyd Gottfredson	Floyd Gottfredson
The Spook Specialist	1947	July 14–26	Bill Walsh	Floyd Gottfredson	Floyd Gottfredson
Mickey Writes the Songs	1947	July 28-August 9	Bill Walsh	Floyd Gottfredson	Floyd Gottfredson
Horace's Nerves	1947	August 11–23	Bill Walsh	Floyd Gottfredson	Floyd Gottfredson
The Skyscraper Adventure	1947	August 25-September 6	Bill Walsh	Floyd Gottfredson	Floyd Gottfredson
The Foundling	1947	September 6–20	Bill Walsh	Floyd Gottfredson	Floyd Gottfredson
The Man of Tomorrow	1947	September 22-December 27	Bill Walsh	Floyd Gottfredson	Floyd Gottfredson
Mickey Makes a Killing	1947-1948	December 29 – February 7	Bill Walsh	Floyd Gottfredson	Floyd Gottfredson
Pflip the Thnuckle-Booh	1948	February 9–28	Bill Walsh	Floyd Gottfredson	Floyd Gottfredson
The Santa Claus Bandit	1948	March 1-April 3	Bill Walsh	Floyd Gottfredson	Floyd Gottfredson
The Kumquat Question	1948	April 5--28	Bill Walsh	Floyd Gottfredson	Floyd Gottfredson
The Atombrella and the Rhyming Man	1948	May 30-October 9	Bill Walsh	Floyd Gottfredson	Floyd Gottfredson
Volume 10: Planet of Faceless Foes
An Education for Eega	1948	October 11-December 25	Bill Walsh	Floyd Gottfredson	Floyd Gottfredson
Pflip's Strange Power	1948-1949	December 27, 1948 – March 5, 1949	Bill Walsh	Floyd Gottfredson	Floyd Gottfredson
Planet of the Aints	1949	March 7-August 6	Bill Walsh	Floyd Gottfredson	Floyd Gottfredson
Itching Gulch	1949	August 8-October 22	Bill Walsh	Floyd Gottfredson	Floyd Gottfredson
The Syndicate of Crime	1949-1950	October 24, 1949 – January 28, 1950	Bill Walsh	Floyd Gottfredson	Floyd Gottfredson
The Moook Treasure	1950	January 30-July 8	Bill Walsh	Floyd Gottfredson	Floyd Gottfredson
Mousepotamia	1950	July 10-September 30	Bill Walsh	Floyd Gottfredson	Floyd Gottfredson
Land Beneath the Sea	1950	October 2-December 30	Bill Walsh	Floyd Gottfredson	Floyd Gottfredson; Bill Wright
Tzig-Tzag Fever	1951	January 1-March 24, 1951	Bill Walsh	Floyd Gottfredson	Floyd Gottfredson
Volume 11: Mickey vs Mickey
Dry Gulch Goofy	1951	March 26-June 23	Bill Walsh	Floyd Gottfredson	Floyd Gottfredson
The Ghost of Black Brian	1951	June 25-October 20	Bill Walsh	Floyd Gottfredson	Floyd Gottfredson
Uncle Wombat's Tock-Tock Time Machine	1951-1952	October 22, 1951 – January 22, 1952	Bill Walsh	Floyd Gottfredson	Floyd Gottfredson
The Midas Ring	1952	January 23-April 19	Bill Walsh	Floyd Gottfredson	Floyd Gottfredson
Isle of Moola-La	1952	April 21-October 2	Bill Walsh	Floyd Gottfredson	Floyd Gottfredson
Hoosat from Another Planet	1952-1953	October 3 – February 28	Bill Walsh	Floyd Gottfredson	Floyd Gottfredson
Mickey's Dangerous Double	1953	March 2-June 20	Bill Walsh	Floyd Gottfredson	Floyd Gottfredson
Volume 12: The Mysterious Dr. X
The Magic Shoe	1953	June 22-October 28	Bill Walsh	Floyd Gottfredson; Bill Wright	Floyd Gottfredson; Bill Wright; Dick Moores
Mickey Takes Umbrage	1953-1954	October 29 – January 30	Bill Walsh	Floyd Gottfredson	Floyd Gottfredson
A Fatal Occupation	1954	February 1-May 15	Bill Walsh	Floyd Gottfredson	Floyd Gottfredson
The Kid Gang	1954	May 17-September 18	Bill Walsh	Floyd Gottfredson	Floyd Gottfredson
Uncle Gudger	1954	September 20-December 31	Bill Walsh	Floyd Gottfredson	Floyd Gottfredson
Dr. X	1955	January 1-May 20	Bill Walsh	Floyd Gottfredson	Floyd Gottfredson
Pluto's Punctured Romance	1955	May 21-June 25	Bill Walsh	Floyd Gottfredson	Floyd Gottfredson; Manuel Gonzales
Li'l Davy	1955	June 27-October 4	Bill Walsh	Floyd Gottfredson	Floyd Gottfredson

=== Daily strips (1990–1995) ===
In 1990, writer Floyd Norman convinced King Features Syndicate to allow him to bring back the comic strip's adventure story format. Norman and Colette Bezio shared the scripting, with Rick Hoover, Alex Howell and Thomas Lewis providing art. With the lone exception of "Reform and Void", the 1990-1995 stories have not been reprinted in the US, and only rarely in other countries.

List of storylines:

- Crossbone Island (Jan 15-Feb 10, 1990)
- The Time Transmuter (June 4-June 23, 1990)
- The Rock Monsters (June 25-July 14, 1990)
- The Zombie Plot (July 23-Aug 11, 1990)
- The Sand Spirit (Sept 10–29, 1990)
- The Grizzly Oil Spill (Oct 29-Nov 17, 1990)
- Fattening Fudge (Nov 19-Dec 8, 1990)
- The Spacemen (Dec 17, 1990-Jan 5, 1991)
- Deadman's Cave (Jan 7-26, 1991)
- The Mad Dentist (Feb 4-23, 1991)
- Artificial Earthquakes (April 1–20, 1991)
- The Ghost of J.P. Mudd (April 29-May 18, 1991)
- The Dumpin' of Toxic Waste (May 27-June 15, 1991)
- The Evil Vampire Count Blotula (June 24-July 13, 1991)
- Dr. Gloom (July 22-Aug 10, 1991)
- Minnie's Airplane (Aug 19-Sept 7, 1991)
- Melting of the Polar Ice Cap (Sept 16-Oct 5, 1991)
- The Jungle Survival Trip (Oct 1-Nov 2, 1991)
- Climbing the Splatterhorn (Nov 25-Dec 14, 1991)
- The Car Race (Dec 30, 1991-Jan 18, 1992)
- Goofy the Baseball Player (Jan 20-Feb 8, 1992)
- Goofy's Flea Circus (Feb 17-March 7, 1992)
- Photographing Bigfoot (March 16-April 4, 1992)
- The Highway Robber (April 13-May 2, 1992)
- Dinosaurs in the Jungle (May 11–30, 1992)
- Pete's Health Club (June 8–27, 1992)
- Theatrical Sabotage (July 6–25, 1992)
- The Metalligent (Aug 24-Sept 19, 1992)
- The Haunted Road Tunnel (Sept 28-Oct 17, 1992)
- The Pancake Baking Contest (Nov 2-21, 1992)
- The Castaways (Dec 7-26, 1992)
- The Art Vandal (Jan 18-Feb 6, 1992)
- Dr. Goofy Doolittle (March 1–27, 1993)
- Professor Goofy (Apr 26-May 22, 1993)
- The Tough Guy Contest (Sept 6-25, 1993)
- The Mole People Robbers (Nov 1-20, 1993)
- Blaggard Castle (remake) (Jan 24-Feb 19, 1994)
- A Matter of Gravity (Feb 21-March 12, 1994)
- Mickey Mouse Outwits the Phantom Blot (remake) (March 14-April 9, 1994)
- Captain Blight's Sunken Treasure (April 11–30, 1994)
- The Gold Panning Trip on Mt. Baldy (May 2–21, 1994)
- The Treasure of Um-Tut-Sut (May 23-June 11, 1994)
- The Mail Pilot (remake) (June 13-July 9, 1994)
- Pluto Gets Lost (Aug 8-Sept 3, 1994)
- Ecks and Doublex Reform, aka Reform and Void (Dec 26-Jan 14, 1995)
- Goofy's Mythical Lion-Dog (Jan 16-Feb 11, 1995)
- Adventurous Ice-Fishing (May 8-June 3, 1995)
- Mickey & Goofy in Itsybitsia (July 3–29, 1995)

=== Sunday strips ===
Title	Year	Dates	Writer	Pencils	Inking
Volume 1: Call of the Wild
Dan the Dogcatcher	1932	July 31-September 4	Floyd Gottfredson	Floyd Gottfredson	Ted Thwaites
Mickey's Nephews	1932	September 18-November 6	Floyd Gottfredson	Floyd Gottfredson	Ted Thwaites
Lair of Wolf Barker	1933	January 29-June 18	Ted Osborne	Floyd Gottfredson	Al Taliaferro
Rumplewatt the Giant	1934	March 11-April 29	Ted Osborne	Floyd Gottfredson	Ted Thwaites
Tanglefoot Pulls His Weight	1934	May 6-June 3	Ted Osborne	Floyd Gottfredson	Ted Thwaites; Al Taliaferro
Dr. Oofgay's Secret Serum	1934	June 17-September 9	Ted Osborne	Floyd Gottfredson	Al Taliaferro
Foray to Mt. Fishlake	1934-1935	December 9 – January 20	Ted Osborne	Floyd Gottfredson	Ted Thwaites
The Case of the Vanishing Coats	1935	February 17-March 24	Ted Osborne	Floyd Gottfredson	Ted Thwaites
Hoppy the Kangaroo	1935	July 28-November 24	Ted Osborne	Floyd Gottfredson	Ted Thwaites
Volume 2: Robin Hood Rides Again
Mickey's Rival	1936	January 5–26	Ted Osborne	Floyd Gottfredson	Ted Thwaites
Helpless Helpers	1936	March 1–22	Ted Osborne	Floyd Gottfredson	Ted Thwaites; Al Taliaferro
The Robin Hood Adventure	1936	April 26-October 4	Floyd Gottfredson (story); Ted Osborne (script)	Floyd Gottfredson	Ted Thwaites; Al Taliaferro
The Ventriloquist	1936	October 11-November 8	Ted Osborne	Floyd Gottfredson	Al Taliaferro
Sheriff of Nugget Gulch	1937	May 16-October 24	Ted Osborne	Floyd Gottfredson; Al Taliaferro	Al Taliaferro
Service with a Smile	1938	March 6-April 10	Merrill de Maris	Floyd Gottfredson; Al Taliaferro	Al Taliaferro
The Brave Little Tailor	1938	August 28-November 27	Merrill de Maris	Floyd Gottfredson; Manuel Gonzales	Ted Thwaites

The two volumes of Walt Disney's Mickey Mouse reprint the Sunday pages that Gottfredson worked on. Following the Brave Little Tailor adaptation in 1938, Manuel Gonzales took over as artist for the Sunday pages until 1981. Due to his military duties, he was replaced by Bill Wright from 1942 to 1946. There were seven more Sunday storylines under Gonzales and Wright's tenure:

- "The Society Dog Show" (January 15–22, 1939), written by Merrill De Maris, pencil by Manuel Gonzales, inks by Ted Thwaites
- "The Photographic Expedition" (March 17-July 14, 1940), written by Merrill De Maris, pencil by Manuel Gonzales, inks by Ted Thwaites
- "Purty Clever" (Jan 19-Feb 16, 1941), written by Merrill De Maris, pencil and inks by Manuel Gonzales
- "Goofy Gets Smart" (May 18-June 22, 1941), written by Merrill De Maris, pencil and inks by Manuel Gonzales
- "Lucky Mickey" (aka No Charge!) (Sept 7-21, 1941), written by Merrill De Maris, pencil and inks by Manuel Gonzales
- no title (Sept 19-Nov 14, 1943), written by Hubie Karp, pencil and inks by Bill Wright
- "The Professor's Experiment" (Nov 21, 1943-March 12, 1944), written by Hubie Karp, pencil and inks by Bill Wright

Following "The Professor's Experiment", the Sunday strip shifted completely to the gag-a-week format.

Over the years, some loosely connected sequences of strips were also published:

- "On the Carpet / Poor Sport / Return Engagement / Everything In Its Place / It's a Slow Number / Fast Action / Injun Trouble / Too Good To Be True" (Sept 8, 1940-Oct 27, 1940), written by Merrill De Maris, pencil by Manuel Gonzales, inks by Ted Thwaites
- "Lesson Learned / Quiz Kid" (Apr 27, 1941-May 4, 1941), written by Merrill De Maris, pencil by Manuel Gonzales, inks by Bill Wright
- no title (Mar 28-Apr 4, 1943), written by Hubie Karp, pencil and inks by Bill Wright

In 1949, Gonzales and writer Bill Walsh introduced Ellsworth to the Sunday strips. From 1949 to 1959, the characters appeared in 85 Sunday strips, and in 1956 he was also featured in 12 daily strips by Gottfredson.

== The Perils of Mickey ==
In 1993–1994, the Disney Company began a branding campaign called "The Perils of Mickey", evoking the spirit of Gottfredson's early-30s Mickey comics. The campaign involved "remakes" of three classic Gottfredson stories in the daily newspaper strip: "Blaggard Castle" (Jan-Feb 1994), "Mickey Mouse Outwits the Phantom Blot" (March–April) and "The Mail Pilot" (June–July). All three were drawn by Rick Hoover.

Merchandise for the campaign often used the "pie-eyed" Mickey design, and included keychains and storybooks published by Golden Press.

"Perils of Mickey" comics also appeared in the Disney Adventures magazine, including "Return to Blaggard Castle", an adventure featuring Mickey, Minnie, Horace and the Phantom Blot, published in Vol. 3 Nos. 10-11 (1993).

== Reprints and collections ==
=== Big Little Books ===
In the 1930s and 40s, Western Publishing published a very popular series of small hardcover books for children known as Big Little Books. These chunky, compact books featured a captioned illustration on one page, with a page of text on the facing page. The stories featured a wide assortment of popular characters, including a number of Disney stars, and Gottfredson's Mickey Mouse strips provided the perfect material for an illustrated adventure story.

The following Big Little Books were published based on Mickey Mouse storylines:

- Mickey Mouse (1933), based on Mickey Mouse and the Gypsies aka Mickey Mouse and the Ransom Plot
- Mickey Mouse Sails for Treasure Island (1933), based on Mickey Mouse Sails for Treasure Island
- Mickey Mouse the Mail Pilot (1933), based on The Mail Pilot
- Mickey Mouse in the Blaggard Castle (1934), based on Blaggard Castle
- Mickey Mouse the Detective (1934), based on The Crazy Crime Wave
- Mickey Mouse and Bobo the Elephant (1935), based on Bobo the Elephant
- Mickey Mouse and the Bat Bandit (1935), based on The Bat Bandit of Inferno Gulch
- Mickey Mouse and Pluto the Racer (1936), based on Pluto the Racer
- Mickey Mouse and the Sacred Jewel (1936), based on The Sacred Jewel
- Mickey Mouse Runs His Own Newspaper (1937), based on Editor-in-Grief
- Mickey Mouse in the Race for Riches (1938), based on Race for Riches
- Mickey Mouse and the Pirate Submarine (1939), based on The Pirate Submarine
- Mickey Mouse and the Seven Ghosts (1940), based on The Seven Ghosts
- Mickey Mouse in the Foreign Legion (1940), based on Mickey Mouse Joins the Foreign Legion
- Mickey Mouse in the Treasure Hunt (1941), based on In Search of Jungle Treasure
- Mickey Mouse on Sky Island (1941), based on Sky Island
- Mickey Mouse and the Magic Lamp (1942), based on The Miracle Master
- Mickey Mouse and the Dude Ranch Bandit (1943), based on The Bar-None Ranch
- Mickey Mouse on the Cave-man Island (1944), based on Land of Long Ago
- Mickey Mouse, Bellboy Detective (1945), based on Bellhop Detective
- Mickey Mouse and the 'Lectro Box (1946), based on The 'Lectro Box
- Mickey Mouse and the Lazy Daisy Mystery (1947), based on Billy the Mouse
- Mickey Mouse and the Desert Palace (1948), based on ??
- Mickey Mouse in the World of Tomorrow (1948), based on The World of Tomorrow
- Mickey Mouse and the Stolen Jewels (1949), based on ??

There was also a set of six "Wee Little Books" published in 1934—smaller books released in a special box set that told the story of Mickey Mouse and His Horse Tanglefoot. The six titles are Mickey Mouse at the Carnival, Mickey Mouse's Misfortune, Mickey Mouse and Tanglefoot, Mickey Mouse's Uphill Fight, Mickey Mouse Will Not Quit and Mickey Mouse Wins the Race.

=== Comic books ===
Gottfredson's Mickey strips were often collected in the 1930s and 1940s. The monthly Mickey Mouse Magazine began reprinting Mickey Mouse strips in issue #16 (January 1937), which continued after the magazine evolved into Dell Publishing's Walt Disney's Comics and Stories in 1940. The title continued reprinting Mickey Mouse through 1948.

Modern-day American reprints began with "The Bar None Ranch" (1940) which appeared in Walt Disney Comics Digest #40 (1973). The following year "The Bat Bandit" (1934) appeared in a deluxe edition The Best of Walt Disney Comics. Abbeville Press' large size Best Comics anthologies in the late-1970s included two all-Gottfredson volumes (one headlined "Goofy"), though the stories were relettered and sometimes condensed. In 1980, Abbeville issued a small-size Best Comics series that included three all-Gottfredson volumes (again, one headlined "Goofy"), all of which reprinted stories from the earlier large-size editions.

=== Another Rainbow Publishing ===
In 1986, Another Rainbow/Gladstone Publishing (and later Gemstone Publishing) began a tradition of serializing Gottfredson stories in regular Disney monthly comic books, which continued on and off until 2008, when they ceased publication. Gladstone also collected a number of Gottfredson's serials in the larger-size "comic albums" it issued during the 1980s;, in 1990, Disney Comics issued "Mickey Mouse Outwits the Phantom Blot" (1939) in the same format.

In 1988 a selection of both the daily and Sunday strip were published by Another Rainbow Publishing in the book Mickey Mouse in Color.

=== Gemstone Publishing ===
In 2006, Gemstone Publishing published a colored and reformatted version of the story "Mickey Mouse Music" for the Walt Disney Treasures collection Disney Comics: 75 Years of Innovation.

Gemstone then went on to publish numerous Gottfredson stories in issues of Walt Disney's Comics and Stories, including "Mickey Mouse Joins the Foreign Legion," "Pflip's Strange Power," and "The Gleam."

Gemstone also announced The Floyd Gottfredson Library, a comprehensive edition of Gottfredson's serialized stories (Mickey 1930–1955, plus later non-Mickey material) with a planned release during 2009. But the series was postponed, then canceled once Gemstone no longer had the Disney license.

=== Fantagraphics ===
In 2011, Fantagraphics resumed production of the series Gemstone had started, with the same editorial team but with the individual books branded "Walt Disney's Mickey Mouse." The Floyd Gottfredson Library series title appeared on the indicia pages inside the books.

Fantagraphics' Gottfredson Library came into print in 2011 and its publishing run lasted until 2018; in total 14 volumes were released, collecting the Gottfredson Mickey Mouse daily strips originally published from 1930 to 1955 as well as the various works Gottfredson did for the Mickey Mouse and Walt Disney's Treasury of Classic Tales Sunday strips.

On November 21, 2018, Fantagraphics followed the Gottfredson Library with a one-shot anthology book to celebrate Mickey Mouse's 90th anniversary, titled Mickey Mouse: The Greatest Adventures, ISBN:978-1-68396-122-2. This book featured black-and-white daily strips newly arranged and printed in full color, in a 300-page "best-of" selection that included "Mickey Mouse in Death Valley" and "The Gleam" among others.

== See also ==
- Disney comics
- Donald Duck (comic strip)
- Walt Disney's Mickey Mouse, 2011–18 reprint collection of Floyd Gottfredson's run
- The Uncensored Mouse
