= Al Taliaferro =

American comics artist

- Born: Charles Alfred Taliaferro; August 29, 1905 Montrose, Colorado, U.S.
- Died: February 3, 1969 (aged 63) Glendale, California, U.S.
- Areas: Cartoonist, Penciller, Inker
- Notable works: Donald Duck comic strip

Charles Alfred "Al" Taliaferro (/ˈtɒlɪvər/ TOL-iv-ər; August 29, 1905 – February 3, 1969), was an American Disney comics artist who produced Disney comic strips for King Features Syndicate. Taliaferro is best known for his work on the Donald Duck comic strip. Many of his strips were written by Bob Karp.

== Family background ==
The Taliaferros trace their origins to Northern Italy and were one of the early families who settled in the Colony of Virginia during the 17th century. The family name, originally Tagliaferro, literally means 'Ironcutter' in the Italian language.

== Early career ==
After his family moved to Glendale, California, Taliaferro studied at the Art Institute of Los Angeles, California. Following his graduation, Taliaferro was hired as a designer for light fixtures. In January 1931, Taliaferro was hired by Walt Disney Studios as an animator, but soon transferred to the comic strip department.

At the time, Disney comics were limited to the Mickey Mouse comic strip, with Floyd Gottfredson as its main artist. Taliaferro was hired as an inker for Gottfredson's drawings. Taliaferro also served as the inker for a model sheet for the Mickey Mouse character. The model sheet would later be featured in Disney merchandising.

Disney soon launched a Silly Symphony comic strip (1932–1939), based on the Silly Symphony short film series. The strip debuted on January 10, 1932, as a Sunday comic strip. It would appear on a weekly schedule, in full color. The original writer and penciller for the comic strip was Earl Duvall, with Taliaferro serving as his inker. In 1933, Duvall quit the strip and the Disney studio, as he was hired by Leon Schlesinger Productions. Taliaferro replaced him as the comic strip's penciller. The new main writer of the comic strip was Ted Osborne, but the comic strip also featured a number of stories written by Merrill De Maris.

The comic strip had started by introducing a new character, not based on any previous Disney animated short. The character was Bucky Bug, an anthropomorphic insect whose creation is credited to Duvall and Taliaferro. Bucky Bug would continue to be the star of the comic strip until March 4, 1934. He was the second Disney character (after Mickey Mouse) to become the star of his own comic strip series. The Bucky Bug stories were typical for a talking animal series, though every character was either an insect or another type of invertebrate.

The initial storyline of Taliaferro's comic strip was a coming-of-age story. Bucky Bug is introduced as a boy, the only son of his family. He has 16 sisters. He departs the family home to see the world, eventually settles down in the city of insects called "Junktown", and marries a local girl, called June Bug. June is the daughter of the town's mayor. The city which Bucky inhabits was built on human garbage, every building or structure was once an item discarded by humans. Besides Bucky and June, the most prominent character of these stories was Bo Bug, Bucky's best friend and sidekick. Bo was depicted as a hobo and always wore a top hat.

While Taliaferro did not draw more Bucky Bug stories after 1934, the Bucky Bug series would eventually be revived in comic book form by Western Publishing. Bucky and his supporting cast have since appeared in Disney magazines and newspapers in many countries.

In the 1930s, the Silly Symphony film series was at the height of its popularity, due to its innovations in storytelling and professionalism in production methods. Other animation studios launched imitations with similar names, such as Looney Tunes, Merrie Melodies, and Happy Harmonies. Taliaferro and Ted Osborne started producing comic strip adaptations of specific short films, as a tie-in to whichever Silly Symphony the Disney studio was trying to promote. In 1936, the comic strip started featuring the main cast of the hit short Three Little Pigs (1933). Taliaferro was the first artist to adapt Big Bad Wolf and the Three Little Pigs into comics, as characters of serial fiction. While in animation the characters soon faded away, in comics they had staying power. The Big Bad Wolf series would be continued by other artists, long after Taliaferro stopped producing new stories for it.

== Donald Duck ==
In 1934, Taliaferro and Osborne adapted the short film The Wise Little Hen (1934) into comic strip form. Their adaptation was published in newspapers between 16 September and 16 December 1934. The most prominent character introduced in the film was Donald Duck, and Taliaferro was the first artist to depict him in comics. Taliaferro's depiction of Donald preceded Donald's appearances as a supporting character in the Mickey Mouse newspaper comic (under Floyd Gottfredson and Ted Osborne), the adaptation into a British comic strip by William A. Ward (in 1937), and the adaptation of Donald into a full-length Italian comic book by Federico Pedrocchi (in 1937).

Between August 30, 1936, and December 5, 1937, Taliaferro and Osborne depicted Donald in gag-a-week comic strips for the Silly Symphony series. The strips were in pantomime style. Taliaferro came up with the idea of a solo comic strip for Donald Duck, but had trouble convincing his bosses to support his idea. He initially pitched the idea to Roy O. Disney, who rejected it. Taliaferro then produced three weeks-worth of episodes for a Donald Duck comic strip, brought them to Roy Disney, and asked him to offer the strip to King Features Syndicate for publication. King Features had syndicated all Disney comic strips up to this point. Roy Disney was not particularly interested in the project, but his brother Walt Disney could see potential in the project. Taliaferro's original sample stories were rejected due to having "weak gags". Taliaferro co-operated with writer Merrill De Maris to create new sample stories, but these were also rejected. Taliaferro then co-operated with writer Homer Brightman, and this time the sample stories were approved. Taliaferro's idea was greenlit and the new Donald Duck comic strip was about to begin.

On February 2, 1938, Donald Duck started appearing in daily newspapers. A Sunday version was added on December 10, 1939. Taliaferro's was the strip's main penciller, while Homer Brightman was its writer and came up with the gags. But Brightman was mostly a screenwriter, and soon quit the comic strip and returned to writing plots for animated short films. Brightman was replaced by Bob Karp, who would serve as Taliaferro's main creative partner for the rest of his career. The inkers for the comic strip included Karl Karpé, Dick Moores, George Waiss, and Bill Wright. Taliaferro also relied on a number of assistant artists, including Ellis Eringer, Frank Grundeen, Al Hubbard, and Kay Wright.

While the Mickey Mouse comic strip was an adventure series, the Donald Duck comic strip continued to be a daily comedy series. Each episode featured Donald dealing with problems and humorous situations. Most of the strips featured stand-alone gags, although some ongoing plots were introduced. The strips often lacked dialogue.

== Supporting cast ==
Taliaferro and Karp started introducing supporting characters from the Donald Duck cartoons, where the duo became the first to portray a number of Donald Duck universe characters in the comics. These comic strip debuts often even preceded the new characters' first film appearances, as the production schedule for animated films was extended over a much longer period than for comic strips. On March 17, 1938, they introduced Bolivar, Donald's pet St. Bernard. The strip found humor in the fact that Bolivar rarely listens to his owner. Taliaferro's design was based on the St. Bernard in the 1936 Mickey Mouse film, Alpine Climbers. On October 17, 1937, Taliaferro and Osborne introduced Huey, Dewey, and Louie, based on a film that was in production at the time, Donald's Nephews. Taliaferro actually proposed the initial idea for the film, so that the studio would have duck counterparts to Morty and Ferdie Fieldmouse, the nephews of Mickey Mouse.

Gus Goose, the "lazy and gluttonous" cousin of Donald, was introduced on May 9, 1938, almost a year before Gus' film debut in Donald's Cousin Gus, that was still in early stages of production. On November 4, 1940, Taliaferro and Karp introduced a comic strip version of Daisy Duck, as Donald's new neighbor and love interest, shortly after her film debut in Mr. Duck Steps Out (1940). This was Daisy's first appearance in comics, not counting her prototype, Donna Duck, who appeared earlier in the British comics and was later introduced by Taliaferro and Karp as Daisy's rival. Grandma Duck, Donald's grandmother, was introduced on September 27, 1943, and was created for the comic strip by Taliaferro and Karp. Taliaferro based the design of the character on his mother-in-law and her old-fashioned ways. Taliaferro's version of Grandma is a hard-working farmer, but out of touch with the technological progress of the world surrounding her. Although not created by him, Scrooge McDuck joined the cast of the comic strip on February 13, 1951, and Ludwig Von Drake on September 25, 1961. Donald's car, the '313', or '1934 Belchfire Roustabout', was designed by Taliaferro on July 1, 1938, from a car that Donald drove in his first titular film, Don Donald (1937). The car has been associated with the character in comics ever since.

== Retirement ==
Taliaferro retired from the daily comic strip on October 10, 1967. He kept working on the Sunday version of the strip until his death in February, 1969. Since 1967, Taliaferro's duties on the comic strip had mostly been handled by Frank Grundeen, who replaced Taliaferro as the main artist upon his retirement and death. Bob Karp remained the strip's main writer until his retirement in 1974. The Donald Duck comic strip continued with new writers and artists over the following decades: Greg Crosby (writer, 1974–1979), Frank Smith (artist, 1976–1986), Bob Foster (writer, 1980–1989), Jim Franzen (artist, 1986), Daan Jippes (artist, 1986–1987), Ulrich Schröder (artist, 1986), Jorgen Klubien (artist, 1986), Tony Strobl (artist, 1986–1987), Bill Langley (artist, 1987), Pete Alvarado (artist, 1987–1989), Larry Mayer (artist, 1987–1989), and finally Larry Knighton (artist, 1990–1995). In 1995, King Features decided to end the production of new episodes of the comic strip, and to start publishing reprints of older episodes.

== Reprints ==
While many of Taliaferro's strips were reprinted in Disney comic books, in only a few instances did he do original artwork for comic books. Among these was the Cheerios Premium Giveaway Donald Duck: Counter Spy (1947) and the cover of Walt Disney's Comics and Stories #107 (August 1949) plus two Bucky Bug stories in WDC&S #39 (Dec. 1943) and #60 (Sept. 1945) and a one-page Donald and Goofy gag based on No Sail in the latter. Two children's books with Disney characters he illustrated are Donald and His Cat Troubles (1948) and Donald Duck and the Hidden Gold (1951).

In 2015, IDW Publishing began three series of hardcover reprints of Taliaferro's Disney comics under their imprint The Library of American Comics:

- Walt Disney's Donald Duck: The Daily Newspaper Comics
- Walt Disney's Donald Duck: The Sunday Newspaper Comics
- Walt Disney's Silly Symphonies: The Complete Disney Classics

== Legacy ==
Animation historian Jim Korkis noted that Taliaferro designed the mascot Litternaut in 1967 who adorned the public trash receptacles in Glendale into the 1970s and to this day is the official mascot of the Committee for a Clean & Beautiful Glendale.

Taliaferro was posthumously honored with a Disney Legends award in 2003.
