= Bob Karp =

American cartoonist

Robert Louis Karp (1911–1975) was an American comics writer.

== Career ==
Karp began working for the Walt Disney Company in the 1930s, and from 1938 to 1974, he wrote the scripts for the daily Donald Duck newspaper strips which were illustrated by Al Taliaferro and, after Taliaferro's death in 1969, by Frank Grundeen.

Karp also scripted the comic book Donald Duck Finds Pirate Gold, the first American Donald Duck adventure comic. The story was based on an unproduced Walt Disney Studio animated feature, and was illustrated by Carl Barks and Jack Hannah.

Karp's brothers, Hubie and Lynn, were in the comics field as well. Bob (writer) and Lynn (illustrator) created the newspaper strip The Middles, which ran from 1944 to 1955 through Consolidated News Features.

Karp was also responsible for scripting Merry Menagerie, the 1947-1962 Disney comic panel about animals.
