= Peculiar Penguins =

- Directed by: Wilfred Jackson
- Produced by: Walt Disney
- Music by: Leigh Harline
- Animation by: Art Babbitt; Pete Burness; Dick Huemer; Hamilton Luske; Archie Robin; Louie Schmitt; Ben Sharpsteen; Frenchy de Tremaudan
- Color process: Technicolor
- Production company: Walt Disney Productions
- Distributed by: United Artists
- Release date: September 1, 1934
- Running time: 6 minutes
- Country: United States
- Language: English

Peculiar Penguins is a Silly Symphonies animated short film produced by Walt Disney Productions. It was released in 1934. The song played during the cartoon is called "The Penguin Is a Very Funny Creature", by Leigh Harline.

== Plot ==
On an island near Antarctica, a penguin named Peter sees a female named Polly, and attempts to woo her. First he offers her an ice cream made of snow and icicles, which she accepts. Next, he tries catching her a fish, but only succeeds in catching a pufferfish. Polly accepts it graciously, but when she swallows it, she begins inflating and deflating repeatedly until Peter makes her spit out the fish, which then returns to water.

Peter shrugs in embarrassment, but feeling humiliated, Polly slaps him and leaves to swim on a small iceberg. On the shore, Peter kicks a nearby stick for letting her get away, but then notices a shark fin moving towards Polly's iceberg. He squawks a danger warning to her, but Polly ignores him, thinking that he's just begging for forgiveness that he won't get. Soon enough, a large tiger shark attacks Polly, who swims away in panic. Needing to act, Peter picks up the stick and charges out to help.

The shark chases Polly around the bay for a while. When it looks like he has her cornered, Peter arrives and clobbers him on the nose. Enraged, the shark starts chasing after Peter. After a while of fighting and swimming away from the shark, Peter tries to escape by climbing up onto a cliff with a boulder on top. Peter unintentionally dislodges the boulder, which falls into the shark's mouth, who then swallows it. Due to the boulder's weight, the shark sinks to the bottom of the bay. The shark struggles until he's too tired to move. Passing fish begin to poke fun at him.

Meanwhile, Polly and Peter reconcile and fall in love, thus Peter's wooing succeeded. They cuddle, and their bodies form a heart-shaped silhouette on the horizon.

== Production ==
Disney animators observed a group of live penguins in preparation for making this cartoon.

== Reception ==
In Animated Short Films: A Critical Index to Theatrical Cartoons, Piotr Borowiec writes, "Beautiful music and competent animation put this Silly Symphony above most other plotless cartoons featuring cute animals playing in their natural habitat."

== Comic adaptation ==
The Silly Symphony Sunday comic strip ran a three-month-long adaptation of Peculiar Penguins called "Penguin Isle" from July 1 to September 19, 1934.

== Home media ==
The short was released on December 4, 2001, on Walt Disney Treasures: Silly Symphonies - The Historic Musical Animated Classics.
