= Adaptation (arts) =

Type of derivative work of art

An adaptation is a transfer of a work of art from one style, culture or medium to another.

Some common examples are:

- Film adaptation, a story from another work, adapted into a film (it may be a novel, non-fiction like journalism, autobiography, comic books, scriptures, plays or historical sources).
- Television adaptation, a story from another worked, adapted into a over-the-air, cable or streaming television series.
- Literary adaptation, a story from a literary source, adapted into another work. A novelization is a story from another work, adapted into a novel.
- Theatrical adaptation, a story from another work, adapted into a play.
- Video game adaptation, a story from a video game, adapted into media (e.g. film, anime and manga, and television)
- Musical adaptation, a play or a film, adapted from another work, that uses musical numbers as a storytelling device.
- Translation of another work

Adaptation studies, an interdisciplinary field within the arts and humanities, examines the process and implications of transforming a work from one medium to another.

== Types of adaptation ==
There is no end to potential media involved in adaptation. Adaptation might be seen as a special case of intertextuality or intermediality, which involves the practice of transcoding (changing the code or 'language' used in a medium) as well as the assimilation of a work of art to other cultural, linguistic, semiotic, aesthetic or other norms. Recent approaches to the expanding field of adaptation studies reflect these expansions of our perspective. Adaptation occurs as a special case of intertextual and intermedial exchange and the copy-paste culture of digital technologies has produced "new intertextual forms engendered by emerging technologies—mashups, remixes, reboots, samplings, remodelings, transformations— " that "further develop the impulse to adapt and appropriate, and the ways in which they challenge the theory and practice of adaptation and appropriation."

== History of adaptation ==
The practice of adaptation was common in ancient Greek culture, for instance in adapting myths and narratives for the stage (Aeschylus', Sophocles' and Euripides' adaptations of Homer). William Shakespeare was an arch adaptor, as nearly all of his plays are heavily dependent on pre-existing sources. Prior to Romantic notions of originality, copying classic authors was seen as a key aesthetic practice in Western culture. This neoclassical paradigm was expressed by Alexander Pope who equated the copying of Homer with copying nature in An Essay on Criticism:

"And but from Nature's fountains scorned to draw;
But when to examine every part he came,
Nature and Homer were, he found, the same.
Convinced, amazed, he checks the bold design,
And rules as strict his labored work confine
As if the Stagirite o'erlooked each line.
Learn hence for ancient rules a just esteem;
To copy Nature is to copy them."

According to Pope in An Essay on Criticism, the task of a writer was to vary existing ideas: "What oft was thought, but ne'er so well expressed;". In the 19th century, many European nations sought to re-discover and adapt medieval narratives that might be harnessed to various kinds of nationalist causes.

== Adaptation studies ==
Adaptation studies is a growing academic discipline, emerging from what was commonly known as "novel to film" or "literature and film" studies. Within adaptation studies, Geoffrey Wagner describes three types of 'adaptation': transposition (where the text is shown on screen with little change); commentary (where the original is changed, either intentionally or accidentally); and analogy (where the text is significantly altered to create a new work of art).

=== Criticism ===
Many scholars argue that adaptation studies has faced challenges in gaining academic legitimacy, often seen as a "bastardization" of both literary studies and film theory. Since the 1950s, the field has been shaped by the tension between studying film culture and the perceived superiority of print culture. As a result of this struggle, the field has progressed "very little" within the scholarly sphere. Additionally, many scholars contend that theorists in the field overlook the cultural, economic, ideological, and historical influences shaping the adaptation industry.

=== History ===
Scholars have debated about the exact origins of adaptation studies and exactly when they emerged. Some argue that adaptation is as old as the inception of texts, while others argue that it is a newer practice as the result of audience reception versus text production. Thomas Leitch breaks down the timeline of adaptation into four periods: Prehistoric, Adaptation Studies 1.0, Adaptation Studies 2.0 and Adaptation Studies 3.0.

==== Prehistoric ====
The prehistoric phase of adaptation studies is defined by broad generalizations of both film and literature, without focusing on specific adaptations. Although the exact beginning of adaptation studies is uncertain, Leitch identifies its conclusion in 1957, with the release of George Bluestone's Novels into Film.

==== Adaptation Studies 1.0 ====
Bluestone's publication had a significant influence on this phase of adaptation studies, shaping the foundational principles of the field. These principles highlight the challenges of adapting prose into film and emphasize the differences between the two mediums. Additionally, this period explores the influence of film on contemporary fiction.

==== Adaptation Studies 2.0 ====
This period is defined by a focus on intertextuality and a critique of earlier models within the field. It is primarily influenced by the release of A Theory of Adaptation by Linda Hutcheon.

==== Adaptation Studies 3.0 ====
The latest phase of adaptation studies centers on two main concepts: the integration of digital technologies and the limitations of intertextuality as a comprehensive framework for the field.

== See also ==
- Appropriation (art)
- Intermedia
- Intertextuality
- Remediation
- Remix culture
- Transmedia storytelling
