= Merrill De Maris =

Comics writer (1898–1948)

- Born: Merrill De Maris; February 26, 1898 New Jersey, United States
- Died: December 31, 1948 (aged 50) Escondido, California, United States
- Area: writer

Merrill De Maris (February 26, 1898, New Jersey – December 31, 1948, Escondido, California) was an American writer who worked on Disney comic strips for King Features Syndicate.

De Maris helped Floyd Gottfredson with many of his early Mickey Mouse comic strips; they co-created famous characters like Phantom Blot, Chief O'Hara and Detective Casey. In 1942, they gave Minnie Mouse a full name as Minerva Mouse, for the four-month comic strip story "The Gleam".

De Maris also wrote for the Silly Symphony comic strip from December 1937 to October 1942, writing the comic strip adaptations of the feature films Snow White and the Seven Dwarfs, Pinocchio and Bambi.

In 1943, De Maris abandoned a half-finished outline for a Donald Duck comic book story. The publisher gave the outline to Carl Barks, who polished it, made it longer, and published it as "Too Many Pets", in Donald Duck Four Color #29 (Sept 1943).
