= Gasoline Alley (1951 film) =

1951 film based on comic strip

- Directed by: Edward Bernds
- Written by: Edward Bernds
- Based on: Gasoline Alley by Frank O. King
- Produced by: Milton Feldman
- Starring: Scotty Beckett; Jimmy Lydon; Susan Morrow
- Cinematography: Lester White
- Edited by: Aaron Stell
- Music by: Mischa Bakaleinikoff
- Production company: Columbia Pictures
- Distributed by: Columbia Pictures
- Release date: January 2, 1951
- Running time: 76 minutes
- Country: United States
- Language: English

Gasoline Alley is a 1951 American comedy film directed by Edward Bernds and starring Scotty Beckett, Jimmy Lydon and Susan Morrow. It is based on the comic strip of the same name by Frank King. It was followed the same year by a sequel, Corky of Gasoline Alley.

== Plot ==
Corky and Skeezix are half-brothers who find themselves in the restaurant business until complications and some family conflicts arise.

== Cast ==
- Scotty Beckett as Corky
- Jimmy Lydon as Skeezix
- Susan Morrow as Hope
- Don Beddoe as Walt Wallet
- Patti Brady as Judy
- Madelon Baker as Phyllis / Auntie Blossom
- Dick Wessel as Pudge
- Gus Schilling as Joe Allen
- Kay Christopher as Nina
- Byron Foulger as Charles D. Haven
- Virginia Toland as Carol Rice
- Jimmy Lloyd as Harry Dorsey
- William Forrest as Hacker
- Ralph Peters as Reddick
- Charles Halton as Pettit
- Charles Williams as Mortie
- Christine McIntyre as Myrtle

== Bibliography ==
- Bernard F. Dick. Columbia Pictures: Portrait of a Studio. University Press of Kentucky, 2015.
