= Cashton, Wisconsin =

- Village
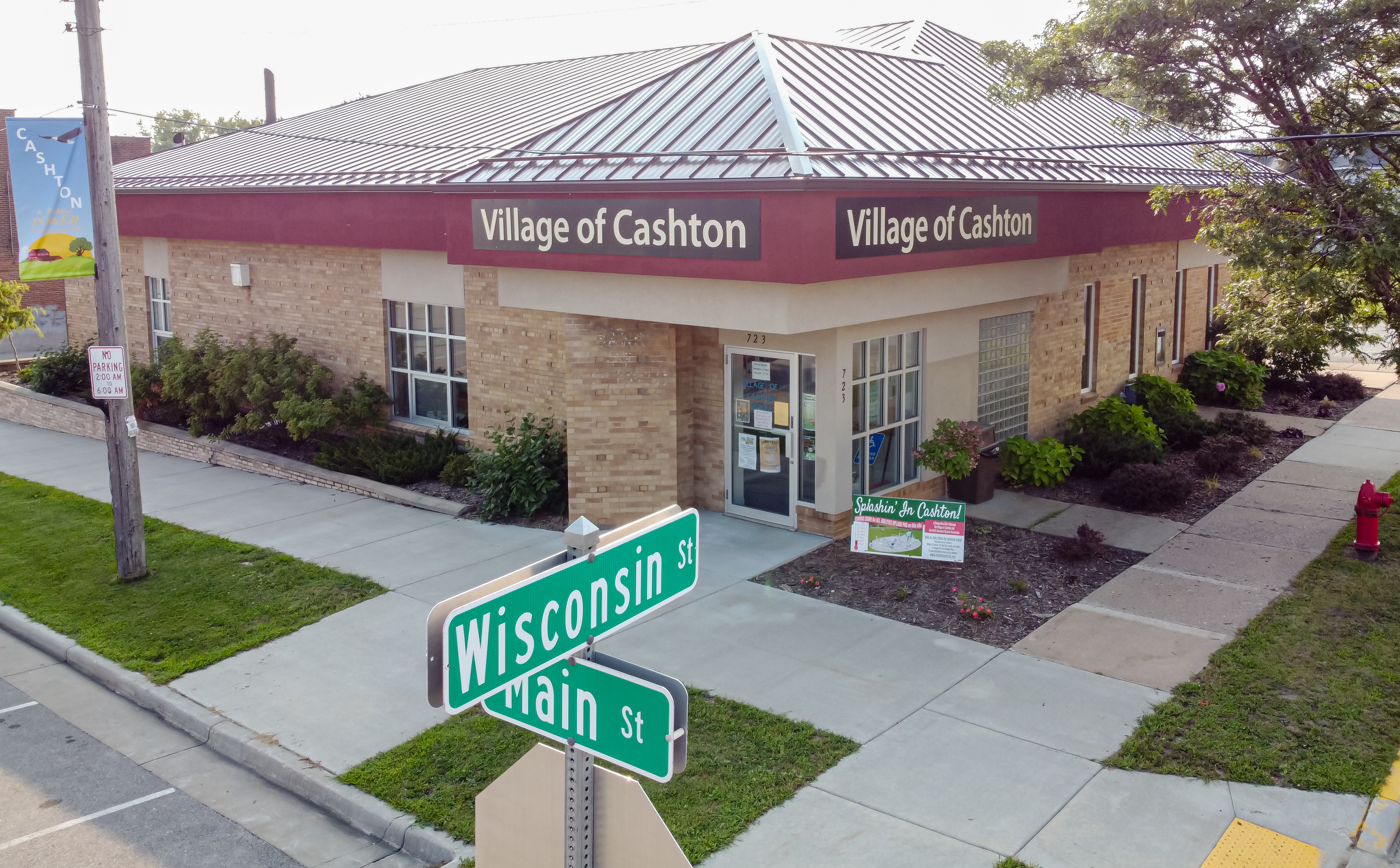
- Village hall

- Location of Cashton in Monroe County, Wisconsin.
- Coordinates: 43°44′35″N 90°46′54″W
- Country: United States
- State: Wisconsin
- County: Monroe

Area
  - Total: 1.27 sq mi (3.30 km^{2})
  - Land: 1.27 sq mi (3.30 km^{2})
  - Water: 0 sq mi (0.00 km^{2})
- Elevation: 1,362 ft (415 m)

Population (2020)
  - Total: 1,243
  - Density: 908/sq mi (350.7/km^{2})
- Time zone: UTC-6 (Central (CST))
  - Summer (DST): UTC-5 (CDT)
- Area code: 608
- FIPS code: 55-12950
- GNIS feature ID: 1562772
- Website: www.cashton.com

Cashton is a village in Monroe County, Wisconsin, United States. The population was 1,158 at the 2020 census.

== History ==
The settlement began in 1854 when Thompson Hazen established an inn at a nearby bend in the stagecoach road from Prairie du Chien to Black River Falls, Wisconsin. The location was then known as Hazen's Corners. In 1879, the Chicago, Milwaukee, and St. Paul Railroad built a branch line from Sparta to Viroqua, Wisconsin through the area, drawing additional settlers. The same year, local merchant William H. H. Cash spearheaded construction of a railroad depot and had the village platted, renaming it Cashton.

The rural area around Cashton began to attract many Amish farmers in the late 1960s, and it is now the largest Amish settlement in Wisconsin.

== Geography ==
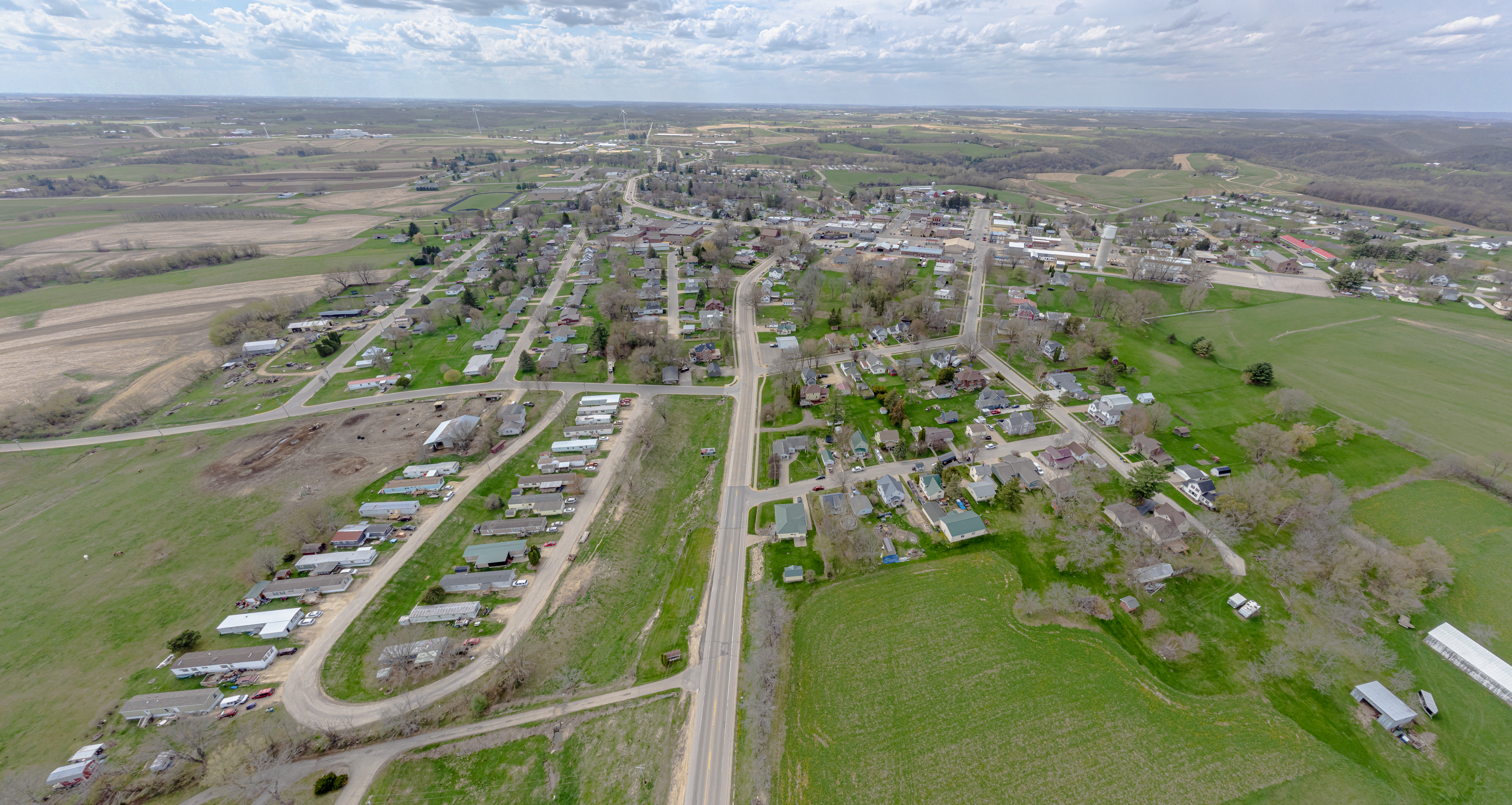

Cashton is located at 43°44′35″N 90°46′54″W (43.743057, -90.781578).

According to the United States Census Bureau, the village has a total area of 1.32 square miles (3.42 km^{2}), all land.

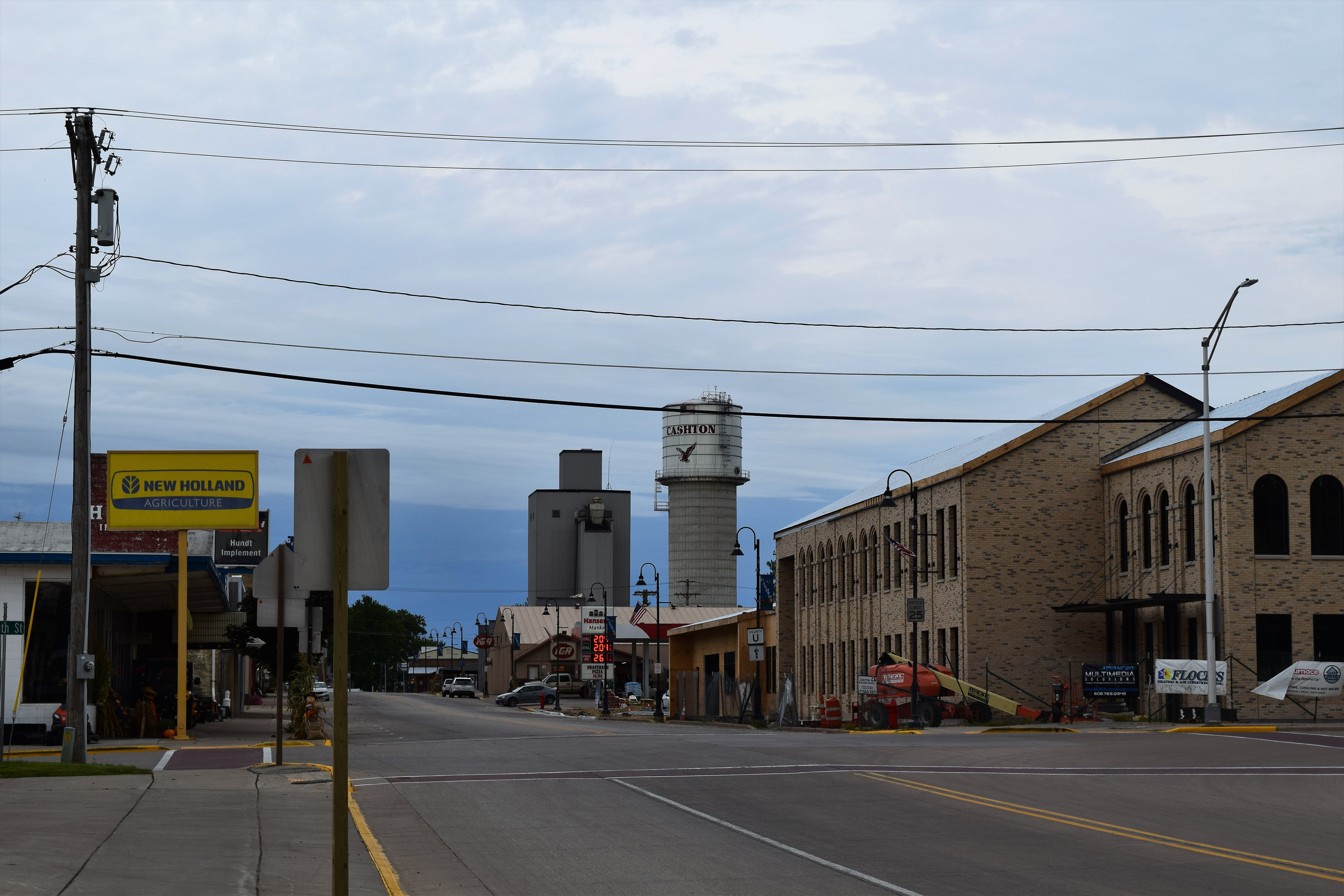
Looking east at downtown Cashton

=== Climate ===
Climate data for Cashton, Wisconsin (1991–2020)
Month	Jan	Feb	Mar	Apr	May	Jun	Jul	Aug	Sep	Oct	Nov	Dec	Year
Mean daily maximum °F (°C)	23.8 (−4.6)	29.1 (−1.6)	41.4 (5.2)	56.4 (13.6)	68.3 (20.2)	77.0 (25.0)	80.7 (27.1)	78.7 (25.9)	71.2 (21.8)	57.3 (14.1)	41.5 (5.3)	29.4 (−1.4)	54.6 (12.6)
Daily mean °F (°C)	17.3 (−8.2)	21.6 (−5.8)	33.2 (0.7)	46.5 (8.1)	58.3 (14.6)	67.9 (19.9)	71.6 (22.0)	69.7 (20.9)	62.1 (16.7)	48.9 (9.4)	34.7 (1.5)	23.1 (−4.9)	46.2 (7.9)
Mean daily minimum °F (°C)	10.8 (−11.8)	14.0 (−10.0)	24.9 (−3.9)	36.7 (2.6)	48.4 (9.1)	58.8 (14.9)	62.6 (17.0)	60.8 (16.0)	52.9 (11.6)	40.5 (4.7)	28.0 (−2.2)	16.7 (−8.5)	37.9 (3.3)
Average precipitation inches (mm)	1.14 (29)	0.86 (22)	1.51 (38)	3.54 (90)	4.44 (113)	4.72 (120)	4.58 (116)	4.10 (104)	3.73 (95)	3.15 (80)	1.95 (50)	1.28 (33)	35 (890)
Average snowfall inches (cm)	15.4 (39)	11.5 (29)	9.9 (25)	3.8 (9.7)	0.1 (0.25)	0.0 (0.0)	0.0 (0.0)	0.0 (0.0)	0.0 (0.0)	0.2 (0.51)	5.4 (14)	8.2 (21)	54.5 (138.46)
Source: NOAA

== Demographics ==
Historical population
Census	Pop.	Note	%±
1880	45		—
1900	510		—
1910	568		11.4%
1920	753		32.6%
1930	680		−9.7%
1940	706		3.8%
1950	836		18.4%
1960	828		−1.0%
1970	824		−0.5%
1980	827		0.4%
1990	780		−5.7%
2000	1,005		28.8%
2010	1,102		9.7%
2020	1,158		5.1%
U.S. Decennial Census

=== 2020 census ===
As of the census of 2020, the population was 1,158. The population density was 908.2 inhabitants per square mile (350.7/km^{2}). There were 494 housing units at an average density of 387.5 per square mile (149.6/km^{2}). The racial makeup of the village was 84.4% White, 0.6% Black or African American, 0.3% Native American, 0.3% Asian, 7.8% from other races, and 6.6% from two or more races. Ethnically, the population was 14.2% Hispanic or Latino of any race.

=== 2010 census ===
As of the census of 2010, there were 1,102 people, 448 households, and 292 families living in the village. The population density was 834.8 inhabitants per square mile (322.3/km^{2}). There were 497 housing units at an average density of 376.5 per square mile (145.4/km^{2}). The racial makeup of the village was 95.5% White, 0.9% African American, 2.9% from other races, and 0.7% from two or more races. Hispanic or Latino of any race were 4.4% of the population.

There were 448 households, of which 34.8% had children under the age of 18 living with them, 47.8% were married couples living together, 9.4% had a female householder with no husband present, 8.0% had a male householder with no wife present, and 34.8% were non-families. 28.3% of all households were made up of individuals, and 12.2% had someone living alone who was 65 years of age or older. The average household size was 2.46 and the average family size was 3.02.

The median age in the village was 34.7 years. 28.5% of residents were under the age of 18; 5.9% were between the ages of 18 and 24; 29.2% were from 25 to 44; 21.3% were from 45 to 64; and 15.3% were 65 years of age or older. The gender makeup of the village was 49.5% male and 50.5% female.

=== 2000 census ===
As of the census of 2000, there were 1,005 people, 415 households, and 271 families living in the village. The population density was 973.3 people per square mile (376.7/km^{2}). There were 463 housing units at an average density of 448.4 per square mile (173.6/km^{2}). The racial makeup of the village was 99.00% White, 0.10% African American, 0.40% from other races, and 0.50% from two or more races. Hispanic or Latino of any race were 1.59% of the population.

There were 415 households, out of which 33.5% had children under the age of 18 living with them, 52.3% were married couples living together, 8.9% had a female householder with no husband present, and 34.5% were non-families. 31.1% of all households were made up of individuals, and 17.1% had someone living alone who was 65 years of age or older. The average household size was 2.41 and the average family size was 2.99.

In the village, the population was spread out, with 27.8% under the age of 18, 6.5% from 18 to 24, 28.9% from 25 to 44, 19.0% from 45 to 64, and 17.9% who were 65 years of age or older. The median age was 36 years. For every 100 females, there were 93.3 males. For every 100 females age 18 and over, there were 88.1 males.

The median income for a household in the village was $30,938, and the median income for a family was $37,917. Males had a median income of $27,500 versus $18,274 for females. The per capita income for the village was $14,425. About 10.2% of families and 14.8% of the population were below the poverty line, including 21.1% of those under age 18 and 12.6% of those age 65 or over.

== Economy ==
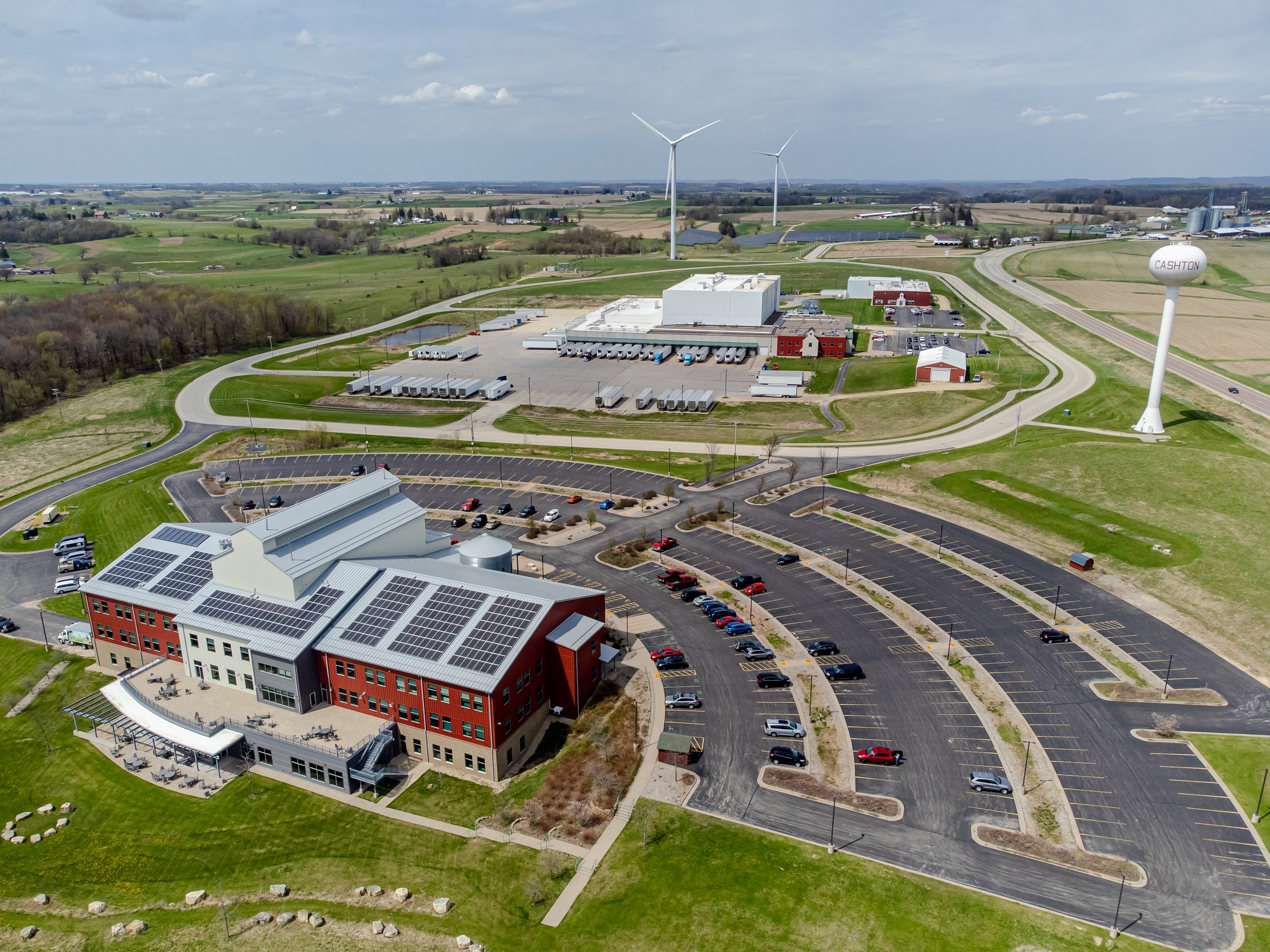
Organic Valley in Cashton

The economy of Cashton is closely tied to Wisconsin agriculture. The organic foods cooperative Organic Valley, headquartered in nearby La Farge, Wisconsin, employs over 275 people at its Cashton offices and distribution center. The area is also home to many Amish shops and food producers.

== See also ==
- Cashton Middle/High School

== Notable people ==
- Leif Erickson, Justice of the Montana Supreme Court, was born in Cashton.
- Frank King, cartoonist of Gasoline Alley, was born in Cashton.
- Otto M. Peterson, Minnesota State Representative, was born in Cashton.
