= Bill Perry (cartoonist) =

American cartoonist

- Born: William Miles Perry; September 26, 1905 Chicago, Illinois, U.S.
- Died: February 13, 1995 (aged 89)
- Area: Cartoonist
- Notable works: Gasoline Alley

William Miles Perry (September 26, 1905 – February 13, 1995) was an American cartoonist, known as an assistant on, and later a primary artist for, the Gasoline Alley comic strip.

== Biography ==
Born in Chicago, Perry began his career in the mailroom of the Chicago Tribune. Some say that Frank King, to prove his teaching prowess, arbitrarily plucked Perry from that post and trained him in cartooning. Others say Perry took art classes in the evenings, and first served as Carl Ed's assistant on Harold Teen. In either case, Perry started assisting King on Gasoline Alley around 1925.

Perry became the longest-term assistant King ever had. "Perry could really ape King's style," current Gasoline Alley steward Jim Scancarelli said. "I've seen some of the very early things he had done, and you really couldn't tell it from King's work."

A portion of a 1969 Gasoline Alley Sunday comic strip as drawn by Bill Perry, wherein Perry shows his ability to "ape King's style" with a flashback to 1921, © 1969 Universal Press Syndicate.

The last panel of the Sunday, April 22, 1951, installment of Gasoline Alley depicts Walt Wallet sitting in a chair, on the back of which is symbolism that signals a changing of the guard. Under a banner that reads "Sunday Gasoline Alley" is a stylized handshake; on one sleeve is "FK" and on the other is "WP". Thus did Frank King symbolically hand over the Sunday strip to William Perry. On April 29, 1951, Perry officially took the reins of the Gasoline Alley Sunday page. He held the job until 1975 or 1976. King still handled the dailies during the early third of that span, but for most of Perry's tenure, Dick Moores was the title's creator on weekdays.

According to Scancarelli, who praised the work Perry did under King's name, "The sad thing was, Bill had gotten older by the time he was taking over the strip, and as he got older, he just couldn't put the same energy into it, so it didn't keep up with the times." When Perry retired, Moores hired Bob Zschiesche (an assistant on the strip between 1950 and 1963) to take over the Sundays, then in 1979 added the Sundays to his own workload.

From 1945 to 1973, Perry also drew Little Brother Hugo, a mostly "silent" comic strip with no talking balloons, concerning a boy who finds clever ways to avoid danger, get revenge on somebody, or defy authority to get what he wants, or who misreads signs and thinks a product is free or less costly than he realizes later.
