= Jim Hardy (comic strip) =

1936-1942 American comic strip

- Author: Dick Moores
- Current status/schedule: Concluded daily strip
- Launch date: June 29, 1936
- End date: Oct 1942
- Syndicate(s): Chicago Tribune Syndicate
- Publisher(s): Dell Comics; Whitman Publishing
- Genre(s): Humor, Adolescence

Jim Hardy is a 1936-1942 American adventure comic strip written and drawn by Dick Moores and distributed by United Features Syndicate. It was Moores' first solo comic strip work, before he gained renown for his work on Gasoline Alley. The strip told the story of Jim Hardy, a down-on-his-luck "man against the world".

In 1940, the strip refocused on a secondary character, Windy, and his horse Paddles. Jim Hardy's last appearance in the strip was on December 16, 1940; the strip was retitled Windy and Paddles in 1941.

== History ==
Moores worked as Chester Gould's assistant on the popular Dick Tracy crime adventure strip from April 1932 to January 1936. During this time, Moores worked on ideas for strips of his own, sending many submissions to syndicates. According to his own estimation, he "wrestled out maybe twenty-five or thirty ideas for comic strips, mostly about pirates." None of them were accepted.

In 1936, Moores managed to sell a strip called Jim Conley, Ex-Convict to United Features Syndicate. Understanding the success of hardboiled crime comics like Dick Tracy firsthand, Moores set out to make an even more hardboiled strip by featuring an ex-convict just released from prison. United Features gave Moores a contract and asked him to provide eight weeks of strips. He left his job with Gould, and moved to New York. In the first strip, Conley was released from prison, making a vow to go straight and never return to his old gang.

The syndicate's salesman tried to sell the strip to newspapers, but none of them were interested. Moores later wrote, "In a few days reports started to trickle in. Boston wouldn't touch any comic strip with a character in it named 'Conley'. The ex-convict idea bothered editors in Detroit and Washington... For one reason or another nobody wanted it."

The syndicate felt the feature could be saved, so they changed the name to Jim Hardy, Man Against the World, and scrubbed the just-released-from-prison opening. In the first strip, Hardy is thrown out of his boarding-house by an unsympathetic landlady, and is immediately conned by a grifter who leaves him with a hefty bill at a restaurant. An old schoolmate who's turned criminal pressures him to join his gang, but Hardy refuses. One of the gang members tries to hold him up on a bus, but ends up shooting the driver, and the bus plunges into the water. Hardy saves a girl on the bus from drowning, and her father gives him a job delivering money to the bank in an armored truck. Naturally, the truck is held up by a crook with a sub-machine gun, and the story rattles on. During the first year, Jim acquired a girlfriend and a kid companion, but this didn't help the strip's popularity.

The character drifted between various jobs, finally settling down as a newspaper reporter, battling racketeers and corrupt politicians. A 1940 Big Little Book based on the strip was titled Jim Hardy, Ace Reporter. The comic continued to struggle, without much support from newspapers.

Moores later told an interviewer, "Jim Hardy failed because I got most of my ideas watching movies, I kept changing Jim's character trying to get the right combination, but I did learn a lot by mistakes, improved my writing and drawing, and finally toward the end of the strip it wasn't looking so much like Tracy."

Towards the end of the strip, Moores introduced Windy, a skinny cowboy who was the caretaker of Paddles, a racehorse, and soon the entire strip began to focus on them. Jim left the strip, which was renamed Windy and Paddles. Moores said that he executed this pivot "because we were struggling and the ship was about to sink."

After the strip was cancelled in 1942, Moores went to work for the comics department at Walt Disney Studios, working on the Mickey Mouse and Donald Duck comic strip, among others. He teamed up with Disney effects animator Jack Boyd in 1942 to found a company called Telecomics, Inc., which planned to broadcast comic strips on television, including Jim Hardy. The show did reach the air in 1950 as NBC Comics, but with all new stories; Jim Hardy wasn't included.

Moores finally found fame in the late 1950s as the writer and artist of Gasoline Alley from 1959 until his death in 1986.

== Reception ==
In his Encyclopedia of American Comics, Ron Goulart writes,

The main problem with Jim Hardy was that Moores was somewhat too original. He was a much better artist than some of the others who tried to imitate Gould, but he lacked the singlemindedness to do a one-for-one imitation of the successful Tracy property. He drew in a personal, gentler version of the Chicago Style, that bold, flat poster-like approach favored by Gould, Harold Gray, Sidney Smith and others. Despite the fact that he wasn't earning much on his strip, he obviously lingered over it, taking the time to put in a variety of patiently inked pen patterns and drawing detailed long shots of city streets and country landscapes... Moores' continuities, mixing sentiment with adventure, didn't offer the kind of wacky, slam-bang action that made readers take Dick Tracy to their hearts. Moores was a good storyteller, but he never quite found the right blend of the hardboiled and the homespun that he seemed to be trying for.

== Comic book reprints ==
While Jim Hardy was not a successful newspaper strip, it found an audience in comic books; the strip was reprinted in United Features' Tip Top Comics until 1947. There were also several one-shots in Comics on Parade and Sparkler Comics, and Spotlight Publishers printed a 128-page Jim Hardy Comics Book in 1944.

== Collections ==
Two hardback collections of Jim Hardy strips have been published:

- Jim Hardy: 1936-1937 (1977), published by Hyperion Press (1977) in the Hyperion Library of Classic American Comic Strips
- Jim Hardy (1989), published by Classic Comic Strips
