= Kay Christopher =

American actress and model (1926–2012)

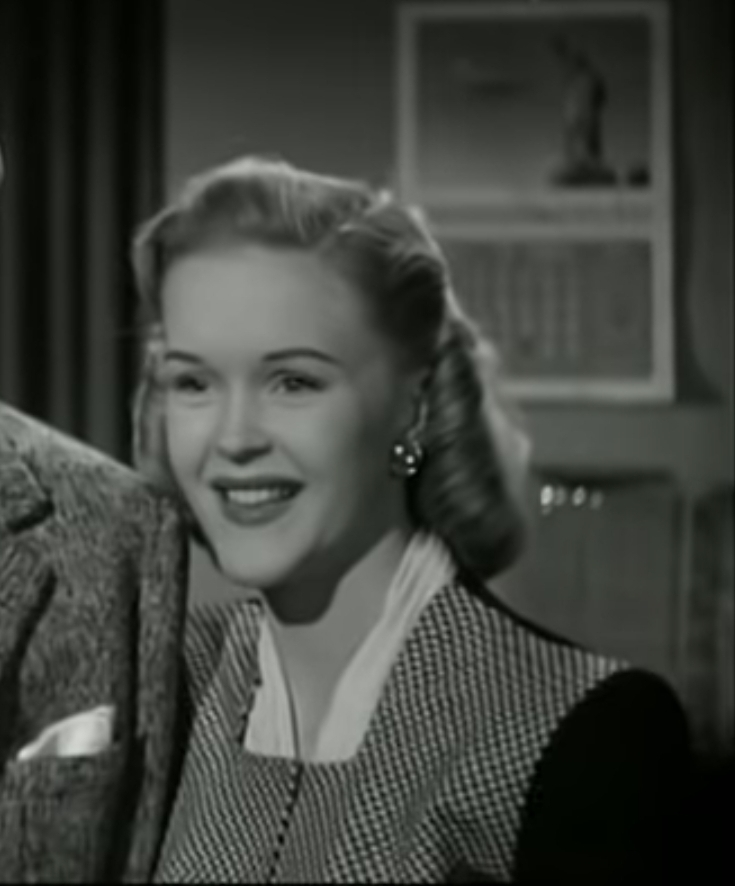
- Christopher in Dick Tracy's Dilemma (1947)
- Born: June 3, 1926; New Rochelle, New York, U.S.
- Died: June 18, 2012 (aged 86); Williamsburg, Virginia, U.S.
- Resting place: Williamsburg Memorial Park, Williamsburg, Virginia
- Occupations: Actress; model
- Years active: 1946–1952
- Spouse: Donald Griffin (m. 1954)
- Children: 3

Kay Christopher (June 3, 1926 – June 18, 2012) was an American actress and model.

== Life and career ==
Christopher was born into a middle-class Methodist family. Her father was a newspaper editor and her mother a librarian. She was educated at New Rochelle High School, graduating in 1944. Christopher was raised as a She began her career as a pin-up model, and was so successful that she received the title of "Miss Photo Flash 1945". Following this success, she received a film contract with RKO Radio Pictures, and made her screen debut in the uncredited role of a bridesmaid to Laraine Day in The Locket (1946).,

She then had the lead role of Tess Trueheart in Dick Tracy's Dilemma (1947), opposite Ralph Byrd. She later had turns in the films Desperate (1947), I Cheated the Law (1949), If You Knew Susie (1949), Code of the Silver Sage (1950) and Gasoline Alley (1951). She also made television appearances on such programs as Lux Video Theatre and had a recurring role on Doctor I.Q. in the mid-1950s. She retired from acting and modeling in 1954 to focus on her marriage to Donald Griffin, although she emerged from retirement in 1958 for an appearance on The Perry Como Show.

Christopher died on June 18, 2012.

== Selected filmography ==
- Gasoline Alley (1951)
- Corky of Gasoline Alley (1951)
