= Jim Scancarelli =

American cartoonist and musician, born 1941

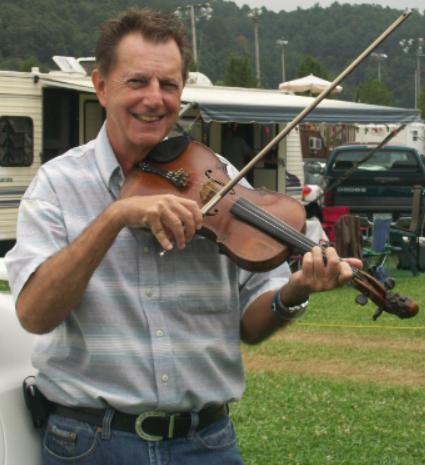
- Scancarelli at the Old Fiddlers Convention in Galax, Virginia (August 14, 2010)
- Born: James Scancarelli; August 24, 1941 (age 85) New York City, US
- Areas: Cartoonist, Writer, Penciller, Artist, Inker, Letterer, Colourist
- Notable works: Gasoline Alley
- Awards: National Cartoonists Society Story Comic Strip Award for 1988

James Scancarelli (born August 24, 1941), known professionally as Jim Scancarelli, is an American cartoonist and musician. Since 1986, he has been writing and drawing the syndicated comic strip Gasoline Alley for Tribune Media Services. In that role, his predecessors were Frank King, Bill Perry and Dick Moores. He had served as an assistant to the latter for several years before taking over. Scancarelli is also a prizewinning bluegrass fiddler.

== Early life and career ==
Born in New York City, Scancarelli is the son of an archivist for the Italian embassy. When he was still an infant, his family moved to his mother's home state of North Carolina.

When his family moved to Washington, D.C., for his father’s job, Scancarelli became the target of bullies in school. This circumstance played a role in developing his love of comics.

"Comics were my escape," Scancarelli said. "The characters became my friends. My dad used to bring home three newspapers every night and we’d read the comics."

Scancarelli's sense of humor was developed while listening to the radio programs of Amos and Andy, Jack Benny and Fred Allen. Scancarelli credits these "hilarious" comedians with giving him the comedic sensibility which later infused his comics, "whether anyone appreciates that kind of humor or not."

After serving in the U.S. Navy, he went into radio and television, including a position as art director for The Johnny Cash Show, creating scenery and writing cue cards. In the early 1960s he also worked as an artist in WBTV’s (the CBS-affiliated television station in Charlotte, North Carolina) graphics department, where he would design sets and props, and draw images on the weather maps. He also would act on occasion, and wrote and voiced episodes of The Yellowjacket, a regular five-minute drive-time radio segment on WBT-FM influenced by the Batman show. Scancarelli had a successful career as a freelance magazine illustrator, and he did slide transparency art until computers made that job obsolete.

Scancarelli's life story has been told in a book titled after his name written by Lewis Stern.

== Gasoline Alley ==
Scancarelli says his deep appreciation for comics was cultivated during childhood visits to his grandfather's house. His grandfather read the strips to him and pointed out details in each panel. His earliest comic strip recollection is of Gasoline Alley. He now lives in that same house and notes, "Little did I know that 50 years later I’d be working on the comic strip in the next room."

Scancarelli spoke about EC Comics and his other early influences in a 1997 interview with Jeffrey Lindenblatt:

The first things I really got enamored with were Foster’s Prince Valiant, Li’l Abner, Roy Crane. Crane still sticks with me a lot. But the guys who hit me over the head hardest, when I got to be 13 years old, were Wally Wood, Jack Davis and Bill Elder on Mad. They were phenomenal! I couldn’t believe anyone could draw like that... I remember picking up an EC comic, Weird Science or Weird Fantasy, and Wally Wood drew some of the most beautiful women I’d ever seen—in spacesuits, or almost spacesuits—I couldn’t believe anyone could render planets and moons and space vehicles with this degree of realism. It drove me crazy, and I would sit around and try to draw stuff like that. I think then my mother prohibited me from reading EC for a while. Then Mad came along, and I would try to copy that stuff. A little bit of Davis rolled off, a little bit of Wood.

A portion of the Gasoline Alley Sunday strip (May 3, 2009) in which the artist paid tribute to collaborator Mark J. Cohen

Scancarelli began his professional association with Gasoline Alley as an assistant to Dick Moores in 1979. Moores sent him the strips fully penciled with the faces inked, and Scancarelli would finish the inking. Although other artists had auditioned for the role, Scancarelli claims his advantage was that he was "the only one who read the strip and knew the characters."

When Moores died in 1986, Scancarelli succeeded him as creator. In 1988, Scancarelli created a sequence wherein Walt Wallet made copies of the Wallet Family Tree. Walt then broke the fourth wall and offered a copy to each reader who sent a self-addressed stamped envelope. It was Scancarelli himself who had to fulfill the requests, which numbered almost 100,000, with copies printed at his personal expense.

The strip's lettering is unique in that it uses upper and lower case, although almost all strips follow the tradition of upper case only. Scancarelli also takes the unusual approach of combining continuity storylines with daily gags. He is the strip's sole creator, as he explained to Lindenblatt:

I do love it. The deadlines are the only thing I don’t love about it... Dick Moores used to say that if he didn’t have the strip, he’d be dead. The bad thing is, he did have the strip, and he did die... Once in a while, Mark Cohen will write a poem or give me an idea for a Sunday page, but I do the rest of it. I stare at a blank sheet of paper and come up with it. (Cohen died in 1999. Scancarelli remembered him with a 2009 Sunday page tribute.)

Scancarelli eschews the use of computers in his work, creating Gasoline Alley using the traditional India ink pen and brush techniques and materials of his predecessors on the strip. Daily strips are composed on bristol paper 15 inches by 5 inches, allowing him room for details that will see publication at much smaller size.

Having also collaborated with NCS president George Breisacher on Mutt and Jeff, Scancarelli became the only cartoonist to be involved with two strips on their 75th anniversaries. Scancarelli had said he hoped to shepherd Gasoline Alley to its 100th anniversary (which came in 2018), and he successfully reached and continued past that milestone.

== Bluegrass musician ==
Scancarelli is a well-known bluegrass fiddler and founder of the Kilocycle Kowboys. "I've been playing the fiddle too long to be so bad at it," Scancarelli says wryly. "The music to me is the outlet. The art is now the job for me." Recordings of his fiddle and banjo playing reside in the American Folklife Center at the Library of Congress. He was a prizewinner at the Old Fiddler's Convention, an event held annually in Galax, Virginia.

== Model railroader ==
Scancarelli is an accomplished model railroader and model builder. His HO scale Cliffside Railroad is a detailed tribute to the North Carolina railroad of the 1930s-40s.

“My dad instilled in me the love of railways and the love of steam engines,” he said. “There was a short line going from the mill and we’d go see it. I got to know about the people in Cliffside.”

== Awards, service and recognition ==
Scancarelli received the 1988 National Cartoonists Society's Story Comic Strip Award. Since the "Newspaper Comic Strips (Humor)" Category (created in 1957) and the "Newspaper Comic Strips (Story)" Category (created in 1960) were combined in 1989, Scancarelli was the last winner of the separate story strip awards. Scancarelli used Skeezix Wallet's fictional past as a veteran, with Army service from 1942–45, as a springboard for storylines supporting military memorials in the daily strip. In 2000, Scancarelli brought attention to construction of the World War II Memorial in Washington, D.C., by having the characters Skeezix and Nina laud the project in the strip. Then, beginning January 11, 2010, he increased awareness of the proposed National Museum of the United States Army with seven weeks of continuity based on the topic. The Foundation responded by compiling a “Sgt. Wallet” entry in the Museum’s Registry of the American Soldier.

Hogan's Alley hailed Scancarelli's "passionate devotion to his craft, and to the heritage of cartooning" in "one of the comics’ most venerable institutions." Comics historian Maurice Horn praised him as "very capable and creative" and credited him with "some of the prettiest artwork in semi-straight humorous cartooning," while also noting Scancarelli's efforts to include more minorities in the strip.
