= Corky of Gasoline Alley =

1951 film

- Directed by: Edward Bernds
- Written by: Edward Bernds
- Based on: Gasoline Alley by Frank O. King
- Produced by: Wallace MacDonald
- Starring: Scotty Beckett; Jimmy Lydon; Susan Morrow
- Cinematography: Henry Freulich
- Edited by: Jerome Thoms
- Music by: Mischa Bakaleinikoff
- Production company: Columbia Pictures
- Distributed by: Columbia Pictures
- Release date: September 17, 1951
- Running time: 80 minutes
- Country: United States
- Language: English

Corky of Gasoline Alley is a 1951 American comedy film directed by Edward Bernds and starring Scotty Beckett, Jimmy Lydon and Susan Morrow. It is based on the comic strip Gasoline Alley by Frank King and is the sequel to Gasoline Alley, released earlier in the year.

== Plot ==
Elwood Martin, a brash extrovert with an aversion to work, comes to live with Walt Wallet and his wife Phyllis. Elwood creates havoc around the house, at Corky Wallet's diner and at Skeezix Wallet's repair shop. Corky and his kid sister Judy, hoping to save the family from bankruptcy and insanity, try to persuade Elwood to move away, but Elwood fakes a back injury.

== Cast ==
- Scotty Beckett as Corky Wallet
- Jimmy Lydon as Skeezix Wallet
- Don Beddoe as Walt Wallet
- Gordon Jones as Elwood Martin
- Patti Brady as Judy Wallet
- Susan Morrow as Hope Wallet
- Kay Christopher as Nina Clock Wallet
- Madelon Baker as Phyllis Wallet
- Dick Wessel as Pudge McKay
- Ludwig Stössel as Dr. Hammerschlag
- John Dehner as Jefferson Jay (uncredited)
