= Susan Morrow =

American actress

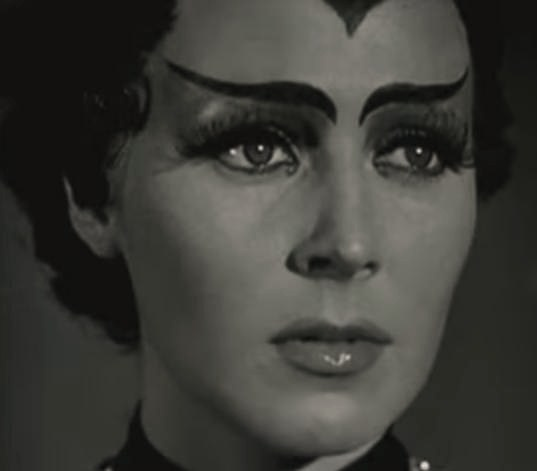
- Morrow in Cat-Women of the Moon (1953)
- Born: Jacqueline Ann Teresa Bernadette Immoor; May 25, 1932
- Died: May 8, 1985 (aged 52); San Diego, California, U.S.
- Occupation: Actress
- Years active: 1951–1960
- Spouses: Gary Morton (m. 1953; ann. 1957) William Robinson (m. 1957; div. 1959) Clarence Sheldon Attix Jr. (m. 1963)
- Children: 4
- Relatives: Judith Exner (sister)

Susan Morrow (born Jacqueline Ann Teresa Bernadette Immoor, May 25, 1932 – May 8, 1985) was an American actress.

== Early years ==
Born Jacqueline Ann Teresa Bernadette Immoor to Frederick W. Immoor and Katherine (née Shea) Immoor, Susan Morrow was the elder sister of Judith Exner. Her family moved to North Hollywood, California, when she was 13. She graduated from North Hollywood High School.

== Career ==
Morrow's screen debut came in Gasoline Alley (1951). She co-starred with Charlton Heston in a 1952 western film, The Savage.

Her television career lasted only six years from 1954 to 1960. Among her appearances were two 1955 episodes of The Loretta Young Show, three 1957 episodes of Gunsmoke starring James Arness (as a love interest for Chester Goode), an episode of Sea Hunt, and a 1958 episode of Perry Mason as Arlene Dowling in the title role of "The Case of the Sun Bather's Diary". In 1960, her three final appearances were on the westerns Bronco, Maverick, and Lawman.

== Personal life ==
Morrow married Gary Morton in December 1953 but separated in August 1954, with the marriage being annulled on July 9, 1957. She remarried twice.

== Filmography ==
Film
Year	Title	Role	Notes
1951	Gasoline Alley	Hope	
1951	Corky of Gasoline Alley	Hope Wallet	
1951	On the Loose	Catherine aka Cathy	
1952	The Savage	Tally Hathersall	
1952	The Blazing Forest	Sharon Wilks	
1953	Problem Girls	Jean	
1953	Canadian Mounties vs Atomic Invaders	Kay Conway	Serial
1953	Body Beautiful	Adam's Secretary	
1953	Cat-Women of the Moon	Lambda	
1953	Man of Conflict	Jane Jenks	
1955	Battle Cry	Susan - Ski's girl	
1958	Macabre	Sylvia Stevenson	
Television
Year	Title	Role	Notes
1957	Gunsmoke	Melanie / Ann	3 episodes
1958	Sea Hunt	Kay Dalton / Joanna Mason	1 episode
1958	Perry Mason	Arlene Dowling	S1 E17, "The Case of the Sun-Bather's Diary"
1960	Bronco	Molly Corley	1 episode
1960	Maverick	Connie Coleman	1 episode
1966	Missile Base at Taniak	Kay Conway	(archive footage), (TV movie - edited from "Canadian Mounties vs. Atomic Invaders")

== Sources ==
- MSN Movies
