= The Savage (1952 film) =

1952 film by George Marshall

- Theatrical release poster
- Directed by: George Marshall
- Screenplay by: Sydney Boehm
- Based on: The Renegade by L. L. Foreman
- Produced by: Mel Epstein
- Starring: Charlton Heston; Susan Morrow; Peter Hansen
- Cinematography: John F. Seitz
- Edited by: Arthur P. Schmidt
- Music by: Paul Sawtell
- Production company: Paramount Pictures
- Distributed by: Paramount Pictures
- Release date: September 1952
- Running time: 95 minutes
- Country: United States
- Language: English

The Savage is a 1952 American Technicolor Western film directed by George Marshall. The film stars Charlton Heston, Susan Morrow, and Peter Hansen. Much of The Savage was shot in the Black Hills of South Dakota. The film is based on L. L. Foreman's novel, The Renegade, first published in 1949 by Pocket Books.

== Plot ==
A young boy, Jim Aherne Jr., is the only survivor of a wagon-train raid by Crow Indians. Sioux Indians rescue Jim, and Chief Yellow Eagle raises him as a Sioux, renaming him War Bonnet. When Jim grows to maturity, his loyalties between his tribe and his white heritage are questioned. Gold is discovered in the Black Hills and the Sioux expect their territorial sovereignty to be respected because of an earlier treaty.

War Bonnet is sent to Fort Duane to determine whether the U.S. government intends to honor the treaty. He helps save a party of U.S. cavalry, led by Lt. Hathersall, from a Crow attack. He introduces himself as Jim Aherne, saying he is taking ponies to the fort to sell, insinuating he is merely a local trapper.

At the fort, Col. Robert Ellis has Hathersall take care of Jim, and Hathersall's sister, Tally, likes him. Capt. Vaughant has his eye on Tally and, therefore, hates Jim. The men briefly brawl.

Days later, War Bonnet leaves the fort on a picnic with the Hathersall siblings and sees smoke signals in the distance. Not disclosing their meaning, he leaves and discovers dead soldiers in the hills. The soldiers were killed by Crow, and Jim's sister, Luta (who is fond of him), was taken captive. She had been with the soldiers while traveling to the fort to find Jim.

Leading a party of Sioux to raid the Crow camp, War Bonnet rescues Luta. Running Dog, a Sioux who hates Jim but accompanied him, deserts him; later, Yellow Dog kills him when he tries to kill War Bonnet. On the ride back, they encounter a party led by Vaughant, who have discovered the soldiers killed by the Crow. The troops attack them without provocation, killing Luta.

Taking her body back to his tribe, War Bonnet is now convinced that whites will not honor the treaty, and agrees to go back and lead the Fort Duane soldiers into an ambush. Meanwhile, Ellis has received orders from Washington that all Indians are to be moved to reservations, by force if necessary.

Returning to the fort as a scout, War Bonnet leads Vaughant's men to a Crow camp instead of the Sioux. They fire artillery into the camp, scattering the Crow into the hills. Using explosives, War Bonnet and Corp. Martin flush the fleeing Crow out of the forest where they are subdued by Hathersall and his men. After the battle, Vaughant, wounded and furious at the outcome, tries to shoot War Bonnet. Martin intervenes and Vaughant is killed.

War Bonnet later leaves camp, meets with Yellow Eagle, and finds they have planned to attack the remaining column the next day. When Yellow Eagle orders no prisoners to be taken, War Bonnet questions the wisdom of the attack. He goes along with the plan but his internal struggle continues after a wagon train of women and children have joined the column for protection.

War Bonnet eventually helps the wagon train escape the ambush but is injured by an arrow. Taken back to the fort, a doctor tends to his wound. Tally and Martin question how he knew the ambush was going to happen.

That night, Jim sneaks out of the fort and, still weak from his wound, tries to persuade Yellow Eagle to abandon his war plans. Surrounded by those who now hate him, he pleads for them not to fight so they will not be decimated and forgotten to history due to the white man's numbers and weapons. Reluctantly, but according to Sioux law for betraying him, Yellow Eagle throws a spear at him, injuring him but leaving him alive.

Yellow Eagle then declares the matter over and says for his people to return to their fires. War Bonnet's mother, Pehangi, then argues in support of Jim's pleas while tending to his wound, convincing Yellow Eagle his son is right. War Bonnet is then taken back to the fort and left outside its walls where Martin, other soldiers, and Tally come out to meet him. As the Sioux leave, War Bonnet tells Martin that they are not going away but merely making some elbow room for others, implying that the war has been averted.

== Cast ==
- Charlton Heston - Jim Aherne Jr./War Bonnet
- Susan Morrow - Tally Hathersall
- Peter Hansen - Lt. Weston Hathersall
- Joan Taylor - Luta
- Richard Rober - Capt. Arnold Vaughant
- Don Porter - Running Dog
- Ted de Corsia - Iron Breast
- Ian MacDonald - Chief Yellow Eagle
- Milburn Stone - Corp. Martin
- Angela Clarke - Pehangi
- Michael Tolan - Long Mane
- Howard Negley - Col. Robert Ellis
- Orly Lindgren - Jim Aherne Jr. (as a boy)
- John Sitting Bull as Chief American Horse

== Reception ==
=== Critical response ===
The staff writers at Variety wrote in their review: "This tale of Indian fighting travels in fairly devious circles to relate a standard story [from a novel by L.L. Foreman]. However, it has excellent outdoor photography and liberal amounts of Indian fighting scenes. Charlton Heston has a fairly confused role which forces the story to travel unnecessarily in circles. [...] The femme interest is slight, with Susan Morrow as the belle of the army fort. Joan Taylor as an Indian maid is Morrow’s major competition for Heston’s affection. Peter Hansen and Richard Rober do well in major white roles while Indians are staunchly portrayed by Ian MacDonald and Donald Porter."

== Release ==
The Savage was released in theatres on September 1, 1952. The film was released on DVD by Paramount Home Media Distribution. The Savage was released on DVD by Paramount Home Media Distribution in Europe (region 2).
