= Adelaida Avagyan =

Armenian physician, researcher, and leader in healthcare

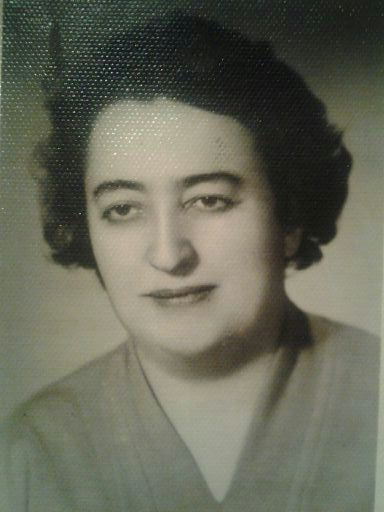
- Born: April 6, 1924; Yerevan, Armenia
- Died: May 12, 2000 (aged 76); Williamsburg, Virginia, USA
- Occupations: Physician and scientist
- Spouse: Artavazd Dzvakeryan
- Children: Anna Gyurjyan
- Relatives: Hovsep Avagyan (father); Marianush Vasilyan (mother)
- Writing career
- Pen name: Adelaida Avakian

Adelaida Avagyan (Avakian) (Armenian: Ադելաիդա Հովսեփի Ավագյան, April 6, 1924 – May 12, 2000) was an Armenian physician, researcher, and leader in healthcare. She was the head of the Nutrition Hygiene (Nutritiology) laboratory from 1969 to 1994 in the Armenian Institute of General Hygiene and Occupational Diseases in Yerevan, Armenia. She is the author of more than 50 research articles in journals of the USSR.

== Early life and education ==
Adelaida Avagyan was born in Yerevan, Armenia to Hovsep Avagyan, an agriculture specialist and his wife Marianush Vasilyan, a language teacher. Adelaida was the oldest of four siblings, Desdemona, Robert and Esfira. During her childhood at Chaikovshi street, Yerevan, Armenia, Adelaida was often very involved in daily care giving and acted as a role model for her younger siblings. Her mother, a highly educated language teacher, paid much attention to good education and encouraged the learning of multiple languages and sciences. Her father believed that each child should be given the opportunity for unlimited development of his/her talents and gifts. Particularly, the Avagyan family believed in providing best education for their children. Throughout their childhood, all four children were exposed to musical instruments and literature. Adelaida, for instance played the piano since age 6 for 7 years and demonstrated quick advancement in performance.

Avagyan graduated as valedictorian from Khachatur Abovian high school in 1941. She then entered into Yerevan State Medical Institute. In 1946, she graduated magna cum laude and received the professional degree of doctor of medical practice.

== Career and research ==
While practicing in the medical field appealed to Avagyan, she decided to pursue medical research. Specifically, she greatly desired to advance the standard of care in hygiene and hygiene practice in Armenia during the 1940s and aid in improving public health and overall wellness. She entered the Institute of Nutritional Hygiene in Moscow, USSR. After being accepted, she moved to Moscow. In 1956, she defended her first dissertation (kandidatsakaia disertatcia) and became among the first doctors from Armenia to have postdoctoral training in Moscow. Avagyan was chosen to travel to Indonesia as an ambassador, guided with the task of reorganize the health care system. Avagyan declined this offer to offer her services in Armenia. She became the director of the laboratory of nutrition hygiene in Yerevan. While heading the department, Avagyan also defended her doctoral dissertation in 1976, which was a result of 20 years of research in the biomedical field. Over the course of her medical research career, she acted as an advisor to young scientists and their research projects while preparing and publishing over 100 of her own research articles in several different international journals. Avagyan also gave numerous interviews in public radio and television programs educating the general public about the dangers of malnutrition and prevention of botulism in home canning.

== Personal life ==
Avagyan married Artavazd Dzvakerian, a civil engineer in 1962. They had a daughter, Anna in 1963. She became the grandmother of three, Asya, Harut and Adelaida (who was named after her). In 1998, Avagyan joined her daughter and her family in the United States. In 2000, Avagyan was diagnosed with cancer and after three months, she died with her daughter and her family at her side. Avagyan was laid to rest at Williamsburg Memorial Park in Williamsburg, Virginia, USA.

== Selected works ==
Subset of translated works

- 1959 Moscow, Nutrition Methods to determine the vital activity of microorganisms in canned meat by fermental reactions.
- 1965 Hygienic evaluation of the thermal processing of meat products by the phosphatase test.
- 1968 Fluorescent-serological method in diagnosing food poisoning provoked by cl. botulinum.
- 1968 2,3,5-triphenyltetrazolium chloride (TTC) as an indicator for hygienic assessment of raw, semi-finished and ready-to-eat meat and fish products.
- 1969 Sanitary-bacteriological assessment of raw, semi-finished and ready-to-eat meat and fish products, made by using resazurin test.
- 1970 Express methods of Sanitary-bacteriological evaluation of foodstuffs-rapid methods in diagnosing botulism.
- 1972 Determination of secondary bacterial contamination of meat products by means of test for the presence of acid phosphatase.
