= Williamsburg Memorial Park =

Cemetery in James City County, Virginia

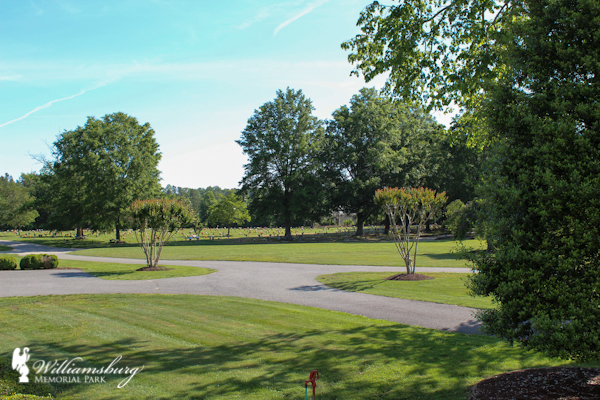
- Westminster Gardens, Section 2

Details
- Established: 1962
- Location: 130 King William Drive, Williamsburg, Virginia
- Country: United States
- Coordinates: 37°19′08″N 76°44′14″W
- Style: English Garden Style
- Owned by: Non-Profit
- Size: 41 acres (166,000 m^{2})
- No. of graves: >5,000
- Website: www.williamsburgmemorialpark.com
- Find a Grave: Williamsburg Memorial Park
- Footnotes: GNIS data

Williamsburg Memorial Park is a 41-acre, non-profit, multi-denominational cemetery located at 130 King William Drive in Williamsburg, Virginia, United States. It was established in 1962 and built on the historic plantation of Benjamin Stoddert Ewell.

== Notable interments ==
- Adelaida Avagyan (1924–2000), Armenian physician, researcher, and healthcare leader
- Bud Davis (1895–1967), American baseball player
- Eric Tipton (1915–2001), American baseball player
- Kay Christopher (1926-2012), American actress and model

== Gallery ==
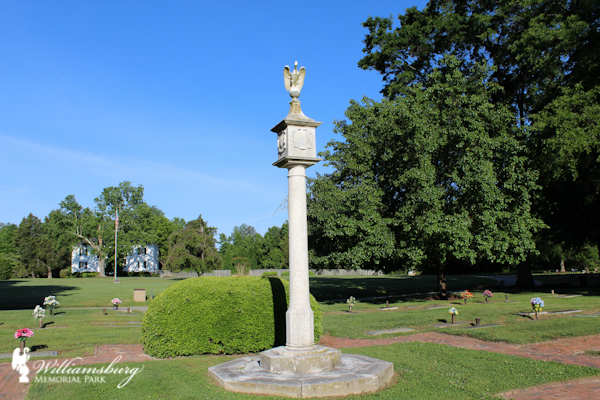
