= Otto M. Peterson =

American politician

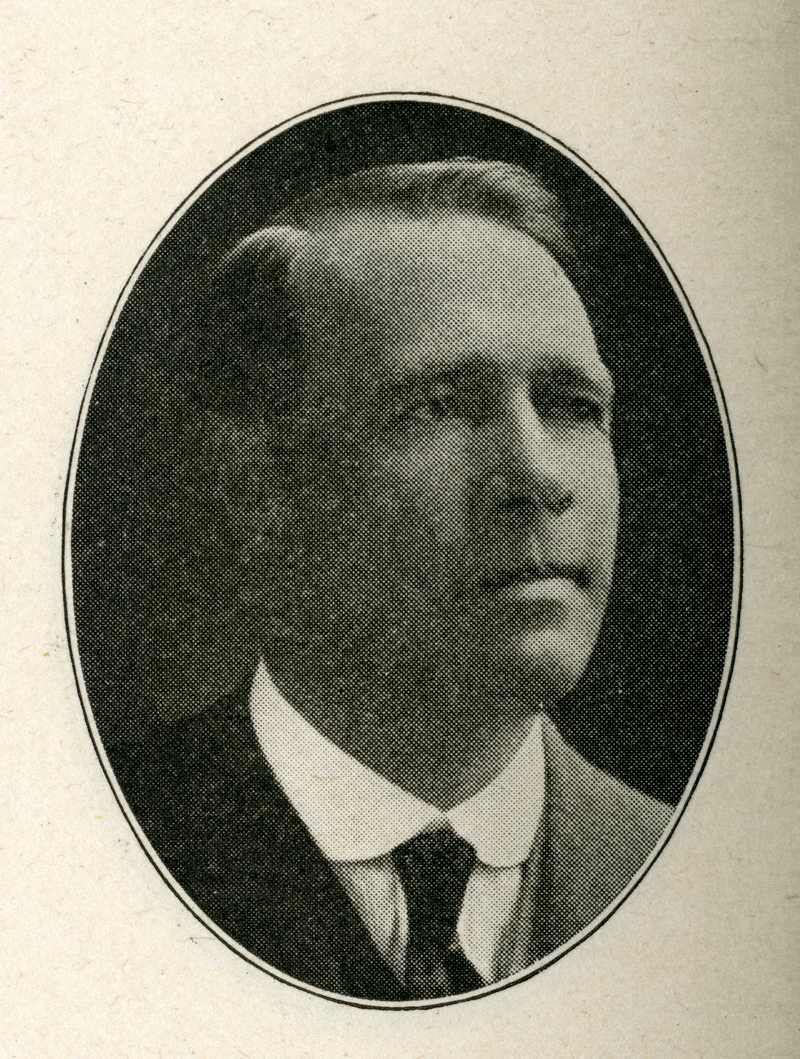
40th Minnesota Legislative Manual

Otto M. Peterson was a member of the Minnesota House of Representatives from 1917 to 1918. He was born on May 4, 1877, in Cashton, Wisconsin.
