= Dick Moores =

American cartoonist

- Jim Scancarelli drew Dick Moores in this Gasoline Alley anniversary strip (November 24, 2008).
- Born: Richard Arnold Moores; December 12, 1909 Lincoln, Nebraska, U.S.
- Died: April 22, 1986 (aged 76)
- Notable works: Gasoline Alley
- Awards: National Cartoonists Society Story Comic Strip Awards (1973, 1980, 1981, 1982, 1985); Reuben Award (1974)
- Spouse: Gretchen

Richard Arnold Moores (December 12, 1909 – April 22, 1986) was an American cartoonist whose best known work was the comic strip Gasoline Alley, which he worked on for nearly three decades.

== Biography ==
Moores was born in Lincoln, Nebraska, on December 12, 1909. After graduating from high school in Fort Wayne, Indiana, he attended Fort Wayne Art School. He also received a year of training at the Chicago Academy of Fine Arts before spending five years working for Chester Gould on Dick Tracy. While working for Gould in Chicago, he met and married Gretchen, a musician.

He met Frank King while in Chicago, sharing a studio with him while drawing his own strip, Jim Hardy, from 1936 to 1942. The strip, distributed by United Features Syndicate, was about a young man, down on his luck. It was never a success, and in its later years, pivoted to focus on a cowboy supporting character, Windy, and his horse Paddles. The title character left the strip in 1940, and it was retitled Windy and Paddles from 1941 to 1942.

That was followed by 14 years working on Disney comics, inking the Mickey Mouse comic strip, drawing the Uncle Remus and His Tales of Br'er Rabbit strip and later Scamp, and a short period in the 1950s at Western Publishing drawing funny animal comic books. The best known of these is the Mickey Mouse story "The Wonderful Whizzix" (Four Color #427, Oct. 1952), which some regard as the inspiration for the Disney's The Love Bug.

In 1942, Moores teamed up with Jack Boyd, an effects animator at Walt Disney Studios, to form the company Telecomics, Inc. Their intention was to produce a television show that would present still panels from a comic strip on television, with a narrator and voice actors performing the characters' voices, including an adaptation of Jim Hardy. The program finally reached the air in September 1950 as NBC Comics, which ran for six months, until March 1951. After the cancellation, Moores and Boyd continued to try to pitch a Telecomics series to sponsors, but they were not successful.

=== Gasoline Alley ===
Moores moved to Florida when he was hired by Frank King in 1956 to assist him on the Gasoline Alley dailies. King's former assistant Bill Perry had taken over doing the Sunday strip in 1951. Moores' signature began to appear on the strip in 1964, and when King died in 1969, Moores assumed writing and drawing duties for the daily strip. When Perry retired in 1975, Moores added the Sunday strip to his workload and combined the stories into one continuing story.

Moores relocated near Asheville, North Carolina, where he spent the rest of his life. In his later years, Moores composed stories, penciled faces and sketched the action, and then sent the strips to another artist for inking, such as his assistant, Jim Scancarelli, who took over the strip upon his death. Moores died of liver and kidney failure.

Although in other strips, children would mature into adults, Gasoline Alley was the first comic strip in which adults aged. Allison "Skeezix" Wallet started out at a foundling left on bachelor Walt's doorstep in 1921, grew up to fight in the Pacific during WWII, married Nina Clock, and they had a daughter, Clovia, in 1949, who married Slim, a mechanic at Skeezix's Gasoline Alley garage.

Moores introduced local events into the comic strip. At the same point that Fort Wayne residents were trying to raise money to save a grand old theatre, the Embassy, from the wrecker's ball, and to restore it, the characters in Gasoline Alley were trying to do the same with their Emboyd Theatre. Even many Fort Wayne residents were unaware that their theatre had been originally called the Emboyd, named after Emma Boyd, daughter of the owner. (For that matter, neither of the Fort Wayne newspapers carried the syndicated Gasoline Alley strip.)

Gasoline Alley had strong characters that were animals. Joel was always with his mule (Becky), and Rufus carried his cat (Kitty) under his arm. A Doberman Pinscher (Kleine) and a Great Dane (Sieg) comically shared Slim and Clovia's already too-small apartment. One memorable story introduced a baby donkey with a forked tail, which the neighbors accuse of being a demon. While the Los Angeles Times speculated that the use of animal characters may be due to his Disney experience, Moores did not market as Disney did, though Frank King licensed a Clovia doll and held a contest to name Clovia.

Moores said that Walt Wallet was his alter ego. "I use Walt to create homey situations and for anybody who's feeling his age to identify with," Moores said two months before his death. "He's the father figure. He's what keeps them together. He's the one I go to when I want to pull the strip together."

== Awards ==
Moores received the National Cartoonists Society Story Comic Strip Awards for 1973, 1980, 1981, 1982 and 1985, and their Reuben Award for 1974 for his work on this strip.
