= Telecomics =

1949-1951 American children's television show

Telecomics (also known as Tele-Comics and NBC Comics) is the name of two American children's television shows broadcast from 1949 to 1951. Along with Crusader Rabbit and Jim and Judy in Teleland, the Telecomics broadcasts were some of the earliest cartoon shows on television, although they were essentially a representation of comic strips on screen, with a narrator and voice actors talking over still frames, with only occasional moments of limited animation.

The 1949 show, Tele-Comics, was syndicated by Vallee-Video as a 15-minute show made up of four three-minute segments: Joey and Jug, Sa-Lah, Brother Goose, and Rick Rack, Secret Agent.

The second show, initially broadcast as NBC Comics from September 1950 to March 1951, was created by cartoonist Dick Moores and Disney animator Jack Boyd, who founded the company Telecomics, Inc. in 1942. The NBC version introduced four new stories: Danny March, Kid Champion, Space Barton, and Johnny & Mr. Do-Right. After the show was cancelled, the existing episodes were distributed in syndication as Telecomics through the end of the 1950s.

During the 1940s, there were several other similar attempts to present static cartoon images in early television; in fact, in 1947, Billboard reported that there were five different production companies all trying to produce similar shows, including a second company called Telecomics, Inc., run by syndicator and licensed-character magnate Stephen Slesinger.

These three companies—Moores & Boyd's Telecomics, Inc.; Slesinger's Telecomics, Inc.; and Vallee-Video—are often confused by animation historians, who claim that Tele-Comics and NBC Comics were produced by the same company.

== Dick Moores and Jack Boyd, 1942–1945 ==
In 1942, cartoonist Dick Moores, known at the time for the 1936-1942 crime comic strip Jim Hardy, teamed up with Jack Boyd, an effects animator at Walt Disney Studios, to form the company Telecomics, Inc. Their intention was to produce a television show that would present still panels from a comic strip on television, with a narrator and voice actors performing the characters' voices. While they were developing the idea, Moores took a job with the comics department at Walt Disney Studios, working on several Disney comics properties, including the Donald Duck and Mickey Mouse comic strips.

In 1945, Moores and Boyd produced a pilot, Case of the Missing Finger, Chapter 4: The Belt of Doom, starring a character named Peril Pinkerton. The pilot was not picked up, and the enterprise was dormant for a couple more years.

== Telecomics test, 1945 ==
Also in 1945, the Newspaper Enterprise Association syndication service tested out the Telecomics concept on W6XYZ, an experimental station in Hollywood. A 1945 article in Advertising & Selling magazine reported:

Labeled by Fred S. Ferguson, president of NEA, as only an experiment to test out the possibilities of television as a syndicate market, the Telecomics test puts eight NEA Sunday pages on the air for a half-hour weekly. Panels, unanimated, are separated and transferred to film without balloons. Background character voices dramatize the dialogue, while a narrator supplies supplemental explanation and sound effects are added. The comics being used are Boots and Her Buddies, Freckles, Brenda Breeze, Our Boarding House, Captain Easy, Carnival, Mister Merryweather and also Otis.

== Stephen Slesinger, 1945–1947 ==
Meanwhile, another Telecomics effort was beginning in 1945, headed by Stephen Slesinger, who created the comic strips Red Ryder and King of the Royal Mounted, and held the licensing rights for Winnie-the-Pooh, Tarzan, Buck Rogers and Alley Oop. In 1945, Slesinger announced that he was founding two companies: Tele-Comics, Inc., of New York, which would bring nationally syndicated comic strips to television and 16mm film, and Telepictures, Inc., of Hollywood, which would produce 16mm film of popular children's book properties. Slesinger intended to use Red Ryder, King of the Royal Mounted, Ozark Ike and Winnie-the-Pooh as his first slate of strips.

In April 1946, Slesinger demonstrated his approach at the annual convention of the American Newspaper Publishers association. In his film, the comics panel first appeared with no speech balloons, but as the off-screen narrator began voicing the dialogue, the balloons would appear. The New York Times described the demonstration:

In two fifteen-minute exhibitions, a film version was presented depicting the current happenings of such comic attractions as Dick Tracy and Otto, the King [sic], as well as a synoptic version of a popular children's book. No attempt to televise the film, which was in color, was made, but Stephen Slesinger, president of the group sponsoring the demonstration, said that experiments had been carried on through that medium successfully on the West Coast since 1944.

In April 1947, Slesinger signed a deal with the N. W. Ayer & Son advertising agency for television rights of the King of the Royal Mounted comic, serialized in five-minute episodes. At the time, they had produced 150 episodes, with production continuing. An article in The Billboard reported:

Technique involved in producing the filmstrip also is heralded as ushering in new potentialities for television sponsors. David Gudebrod, manager of Ayer's motion picture and television bureau, expressed his enthusiasm by saying it may "greatly ease current agency-sponsor video problems." Aside from audience participation and sports shows, he said that most video today costs too much for what a sponsor can get out of it. Films for television also cost too much for most sponsors, what with studio, technical and talent expenses involved. Technique used for King, however, reportedly introduces new methods at costs far below those of the past. Process used by Telecomics makes use of special optical effects, camera movements, fades, dissolves and wipes which give the semblance of animation without using expensive animation technique."

In November 1947, The Billboard reported that five organizations were vying to produce a Telecomics-like presentation for TV, including two different companies named Telecomics, Inc. — Slesinger's company, which was promoting the King of the Royal Mounted show, and Dick Moores and Jack Boyd's company, now run by agent Jimmy Saphier, which was offering Jim Hardy and a new strip, Kid Champion.

In addition to these, Edgar Bergen also had a set of animated characters called Telekins, a short-lived company called Century Television Corporation had signed deals with twenty comic strips including Joe Palooka and Mutt and Jeff, and United Features Syndicate was pitching Li'l Abner and Nancy.

The Billboard story also reported:

Conflict over use of the Telecomics name this week drew a protest from the Slesinger subsidiary, which may be a prelude to legal conflict over its use. John Howell, veepee of the firm, said they have been protected both copywise and titlewise for nearly a year, and intend to investigate any transgression of the rights.

Despite these threats, the legal action never transpired, and as late as 1951, both companies called Telecomics, Inc. were still active—Slesinger's in New York City, and Moores/Boyd's company in Hollywood.

However, Slesinger did get the honor of reaching the airwaves first. In December 1947, two Slesinger Telecomics Christmas specials billed as "Television Fantasies"—Gingerbread Man and Santa and the Angel—aired on Christmas Eve and again on Christmas Day on WCBS-TV in New York.

== Tele-Comics, 1949 ==
In 1949, a syndicated show finally got on the air: Tele-Comics, produced by singer Rudy Vallée's short-lived television production company, Vallee-Video.

Tele-Comics was fifteen minutes long, presenting four three-minute comic strip stories:

- Brother Goose by Cal Howard
- Joey and Jug by Arnold Gillespie
- Rick Rack, Secret Agent by Miles Pike and Pete Burness
- Sa-Lah by AJ Metcalf.

The strips were voiced by Jack Kirkwood, Lilien Leigh and Bill Grey. The show did not last for long, and there are no surviving episodes.

== NBC Comics, 1950–1951 ==
Meanwhile, Dick Moores and Jack Boyd were trying to sell Telecomics to a network, including Moores' comic Jim Hardy. A November 16, 1949 article in the Pasadena Independent told their story:

An example of a good TV show going begging is Telecomics. Some seven years ago, Jack Boyd and Dick Moores started adapting comic strip techniques for use on TV. For the past two years they have been trying to sell their Telecomics to TV. Boyd and Moores have produced a five-day-a-week package show, employing strictly comic strip art, but filmed in such a way that the viewer gets a distinct illusion of movement.

A serial chapter in one of their series, Jim Hardy, has a runaway streetcar sequence in which the individual drawings are put together on film so cleverly that the viewer is not conscious of the fact that he is looking at a strip of still pictures. There is actually no animation, but the effect is practically the same to the eye. Dialogue is taken care of by a narrator...

Moores and Boyd are both confident that video is a natural for Telecomics. Advertising agency men and TV broadcasters unanimously have told Boyd and Moores that they have something. So, like the inventors of the zipper, the Telecomics creators are waiting for someone who has the money and courage to "discover" them.

On August 7, 1950, Daily Variety announced that NBC picked had picked up Moores and Boyd's show, retitling it NBC Comics. NBC Comics debuted as a weekday show on September 18, 1950, in the 5:00-5:15pm slot, following Kate Smith. The show was sponsored by Standard Brands, and produced by Don Dewar.

NBC Comics included four three-minute segments:

- Danny March: Danny, an orphan raised by his uncle in Metro City, grows up on the streets. He applies for a job as a police officer, but is rejected for being too short. Danny becomes a private eye, and is hired as the Mayor's personal detective.
- Kid Champion: Young Eddie Hale is pressured into becoming a boxer by his prize-fighter father, but wants to pursue a career in music. Mistakenly believing that he's killed a gas station attendant, Eddie gets a job with fight promoter Lucky Skinner, changes his name to "Kid Champion" and refuses to talk about his past.
- Space Barton: Horace Barton Jr., college football star, enlists in the U.S. Army Air Corps and tests the first jet airplane. He meets an astronomer, Professor Dinehart, who's built a rocket ship. Barton and Dinehart blast off, taking Barton's kid brother Jackie as a stowaway. On Mars, Barton gets involved in a civil war against a group led by an insane Earth scientist who'd reached Mars first.
- Johnny and Mr. Do-Right: A young boy is scolded by his talking dog, Mr. Do-Right, who teaches him about health and safety tips. Several of these episodes were combined to make a short film, "Good Health Habits".

The voice cast included Robert C. Bruce (the narrator for a number of Warner Bros. cartoons) Lurene Tuttle, and Patrick McGeehan. Howard McNear (later Floyd the barber on The Andy Griffith Show) voiced Space Barton, Danny March and Kid Champion. Johnny and Mr. Do-Right was narrated by Verne Smith.

The show was dropped on March 30, 1951, because Lever Brothers wanted the 5:00-5:15 timeslot. 165 episodes were produced. NBC made back its cost very quickly, and syndicated the episodes as Telecomics. The show aired on WCBS-TV in New York from 1952 to 1953. The episodes were acquired for distribution in 1954 by the newly-formed National Telefilm Associates, and they aired through the end of the 1950s.

== Continued work, 1951 ==
After NBC Comics was cancelled, Moores, Boyd and Dewar continued working on the concept. An Associated Press article in April 1951 reported:

The partners started with a series for NBC... Once you got interested in the story you forgot the lack of action — almost. But the partners considered this too static. Now in a new series being readied, they think they've gone about as far as you can go with a TV cartoon, considering time and money limitations.

There'll be action in this one. When a character talks, his lips will move, although the rest of his face may not. He'll walk or throw things, if necessary. Cars and trains will move. There'll be motion, but not the continuous flowing motion of a movie cartoon.

"Television will probably never have completely animated cartoons," says Dewar, "unless Disney and other producers release their old ones, which isn't likely. Their processes are too costly. Why, we can turn out a feature for a fiftieth as much and in a fraction of the time. Let's face it, TV is a quantity medium, not quality."

In June, Billboard reported that Dewar was pitching a 15-minute show featuring Peril Pinkerton to advertisers. The new show never made it to air.

== See also ==
- Cartoon Teletales, aired from November 1948 to September 1950 on ABC.
