= The Blazing Forest =

1952 American film by Edward Ludwig

- Theatrical release poster
- Directed by: Edward Ludwig
- Screenplay by: Lewis R. Foster; Winston Miller
- Produced by: William H. Pine; William C. Thomas
- Starring: John Payne; William Demarest; Agnes Moorehead; Richard Arlen; Susan Morrow; Roscoe Ates; Lynne Roberts
- Cinematography: Lionel Lindon
- Edited by: Howard A. Smith
- Music by: Lucien Cailliet
- Production company: Pine-Thomas Productions
- Distributed by: Paramount Pictures
- Release date: December 1952
- Running time: 90 minutes
- Country: United States
- Language: English

The Blazing Forest is a 1952 American lumberjack adventure film directed by Edward Ludwig, written by Lewis R. Foster and Winston Miller and starring John Payne, William Demarest, Agnes Moorehead, Richard Arlen, Susan Morrow, Roscoe Ates and Lynne Roberts. The film was released in December 1952 by Paramount Pictures.

== Plot ==
Determined to keep her struggling Nevada timber business afloat, Jessie Crain borrows money from former sweetheart Syd Jessup while also promising lumberman Kelly Hansen a quarter of her profits if he will become her foreman.

Sharon Wilks, Jessie's restless niece who yearns to move to the city, is attracted to Kelly. Jessie's crew resent Kelly's hard-driving manner, which includes forcing the men to work in a torrential rainstorm to meet a lumber quota.

A job is given to Jessie's brother, lumberjack Joe Morgan, whose embezzling has forced Jessie to pay his debts. Joe creates trouble for Joe's estranged wife Grace. Syd, who is resentful, causes a crash with a speeding truck that starts a forest fire and fatally injures Joe. A helicopter rescue saves lives and the business as Kelly persuades Sharon to remain by his side.

== Cast ==
- John Payne as Kelly Hansen
- William Demarest as Syd Jessup
- Agnes Moorehead as Jessie Crain
- Richard Arlen as Joe Morgan
- Susan Morrow as Sharon Wilks
- Roscoe Ates as Beans
- Lynne Roberts as Grace Hanson
- Walter Reed as Max
- Ewing Mitchell as Walt

== Reception ==
In a contemporary review for the Los Angeles Times, critic Grace Kingsley wrote: "[F]ine acting, resulting in real characterization, plus realistic action and techniques of mountain fire and flood fighting and logging make one forget that the tale belongs to the predictable class."

In The Philadelphia Inquirer, critic Mildred Martin wrote: "A pedestrian script, bogged down with dialogue, plods along ... Under Edward Ludwig's direction, action moves too slowly to hold attention."

== Comic-book adaptation ==
- Eastern Color Movie Love #15 (June 1952)
