= Frank King (cartoonist) =

American cartoonist (1883–1969)

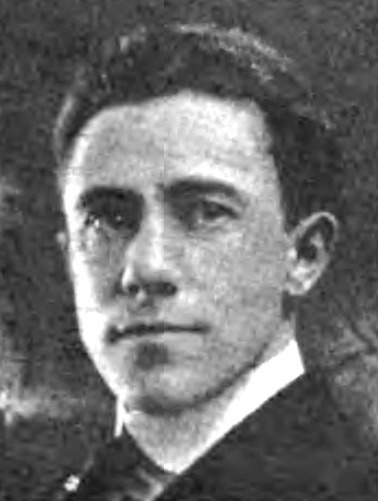
- King circa 1916
- Born: Frank Oscar King; April 9, 1883 Cashton, Wisconsin, U.S.
- Died: June 24, 1969 (aged 86) Winter Park, Florida, U.S.
- Area: Cartoonist
- Notable works: Gasoline Alley

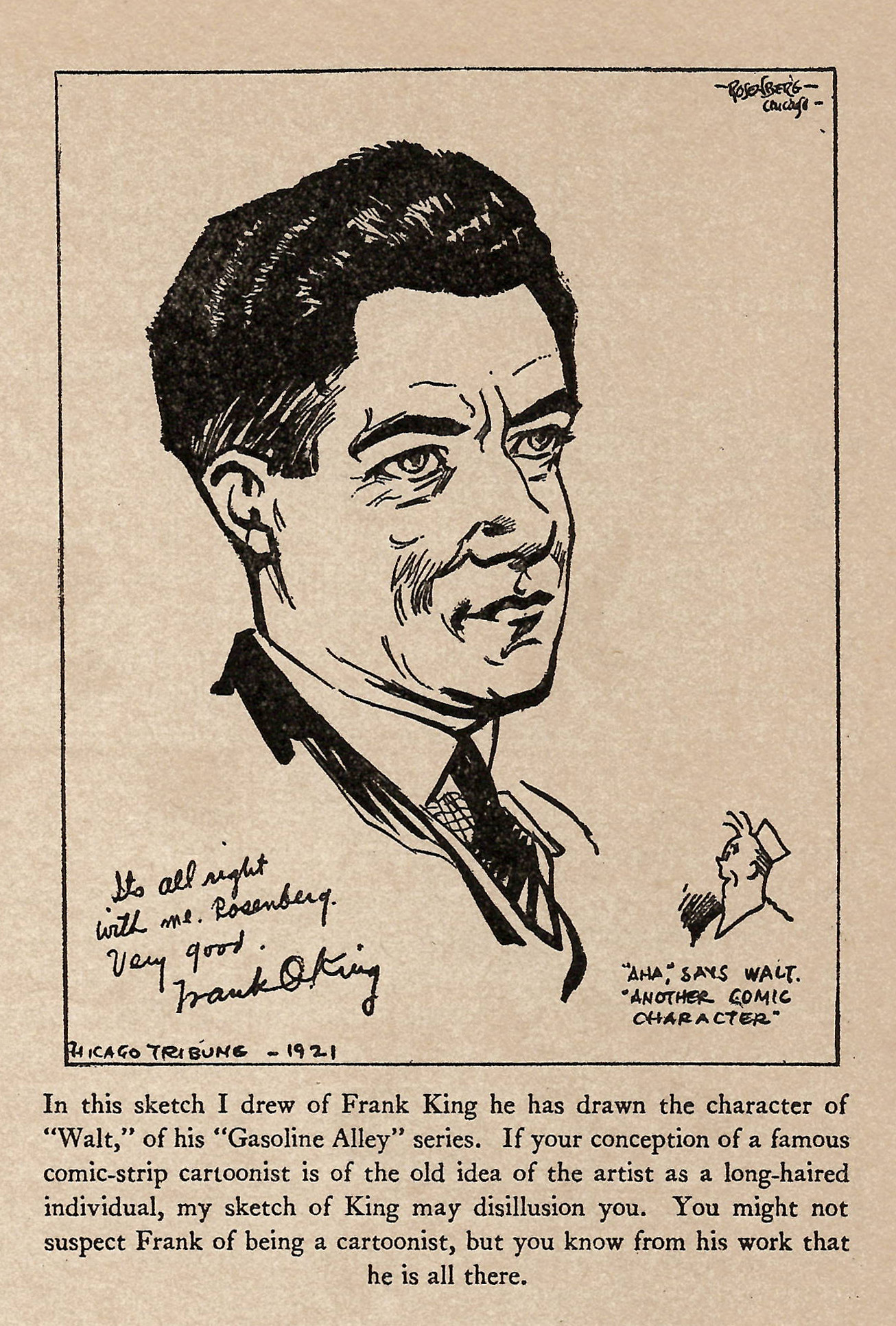
Signed sketch of Frank King by Manuel Rosenberg, 1921

Frank Oscar King (April 9, 1883 – June 24, 1969) was an American cartoonist best known for his comic strip Gasoline Alley. In addition to innovations with color and page design, King introduced real-time continuity in comic strips by showing his characters aging over generations.

== Early life and education ==
Born in Cashton, Wisconsin, King was the older of the two sons of mechanic John J. King and his wife Caroline. When Frank was four years old, he moved with his parents to 1710 Superior Avenue in Tomah, Wisconsin, where they operated their family general store. He started drawing while growing up in Tomah, where he graduated from Tomah High School in 1901.

He entered country fair drawing competitions; a sign he drew for a hotel bootblack earned him only 25 cents, but it was seen by a traveling salesman who learned it had been drawn by the son of one of his customers. The salesman arranged an interview for King with a Minneapolis newspaper editor. King began earning $7 a week at the Minneapolis Times, and during his four years there, he doubled his salary while creating drawings and doing retouching. He also worked as a courtroom sketch artist. On March 17, 1905, he gave a chalk talk at a Minneapolis St. Patrick's Day celebration.

== Chicago cartoonists ==
In 1905-06, he studied art at the Chicago Academy of Fine Arts. After a spell at an ad agency and a brief time at the Chicago American, he spent three years with the Chicago Examiner, where he worked next to cartoonist T. S. Sullivant. In 1909, King left the Examiner to work at the Chicago Tribune, where, according to his friend, Chicago cartoonist Lew Merrell, he increased his weekly pay 50 cents. At the Tribune he worked alongside Clare Briggs, Dean Cornwell and Garrett Price. In 1910, he began a short-lived daily comic strip, Jonah, a Whale for Trouble, which ran in the Tribune from October 3, 1910, until December 8, 1910. He followed with a Tribune Sunday strip, Young Teddy, which was seen briefly from September 10, 1911, to October 6, 1912. His funny frog Sunday strip, Hi-Hopper, ran from February 1, 1914, until December 27, 1914.

On February 7, 1911, King married Delia Drew, also from Tomah. They were both 18 years old, and moved into a series of apartments on the South Side of Chicago. Delia gave birth to a stillborn daughter in 1912, and in 1916, a son, Robert Drew King, was born. It was at this time that the family moved to 533 Madison in Glencoe, a somewhat affluent suburb on Lake Michigan north of Chicago. In 1916, King's salary from the Tribune was $5000. By 1925, this had grown to $22,500, a princely sum that was augmented by royalties from Gasoline Alley books and toys.

== The Rectangle ==
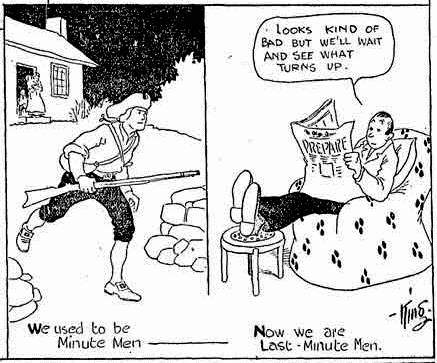
Detail from The Rectangle (April 8, 1917), two days after the U.S. entered WWI.

The Rectangle began as a Chicago Tribune page featuring a variety of cartoons and serial features. King's Rectangle Sunday page, usually printed in black-and-white outside the comics section, was a late addition to a page that ran for years in the Tribune. On January 9, 1913, King introduced a bounded rectangle containing themed single-panel gags (beginning with a page headed Hints to Husbandettes), but pages in that format did not appear with any regularity until February 1914. The Rectangle title was finally introduced on December 27, 1914.

King created several recurring strips, including Tough Teddy, The Boy Animal Trainer, Here Comes Motorcycle Mike, Hi Hopper (about a frog) and his first successful full-page comic, Bobby Make-Believe (January 31, 1915, to December 7, 1919). During World War I, King was overseas drawing scenes of the war for publication in American newspapers.

Bobby Make-Believe, Here Comes Motorcycle Mike, Hi Hopper and other pre-Gasoline Alley comic strips by King were reprinted by Sunday Press Books in a hardcover titled: Crazy Quilt by Frank King: Scraps and Panels on the way to Gasoline Alley, Comics from 1909-1919, 2017 (ISBN 978-0-98355-045-7).

== Gasoline Alley ==
On Sunday, November 24, 1918, the bottom quadrant of The Rectangle featured Walter Weatherby Wallet and his neighbors Bill, Doc and Avery as they repaired their automobiles in the alley behind their houses. The corner was titled Sunday Morning in Gasoline Alley.

King recalled, "My brother had a car that he kept in the alley with a fellow by the name of Bill Gannon and some others. I'd go to his house on Sunday, and we'd go down the alley and run into somebody else and talk cars. That was the beginning of Gasoline Alley." After King began the daily Gasoline Alley strip (August 24, 1919), The Rectangle appeared sporadically and finally came to an end on February 8, 1920.

Gasoline Alley (November 24, 2008)

King often credited his wife, Delia, for providing a "woman's angle" to Gasoline Alley. The central character of Walt was based on King's brother-in-law, Walter White Drew (1886–1941), and he used his own son, Robert Drew King, as the model for Skeezix. Tomah's Dr. Johnson was the inspiration for the character of Doc, and Bill in the strip was based on Bill Gannon.

King hired young Bill Perry from the Chicago Tribune's mail room and then trained him to work as his assistant. Although King leaned toward a homespun simplicity in his Sunday story situations, he also introduced some unusual experiments with time and space, as noted by comics critic Paul Gravett:

Other precedents from America’s newspaper supplements were occasional experiments by Frank King in his Gasoline Alley Sunday pages where he would turn the whole page into one continuous landscape. For example, on 24 May 1931, King uses an unrealistic, almost isometric perspective to turn the page into a single image, like a diagram viewed from above, of the neighborhood and its assorted residents. This angled aerial view he divides into 12 equal panels, each containing at least one fresh character to contribute their own moment of comedy. In more of an ensemble of jokes than a strictly linear narrative, no characters appear here more than once. King went further, however, in 1934 when over three consecutive weeks he used the whole page as one image to portray a house being built, from bare site to construction to finishing touches. The first of these, dated 25 March 1934, presents repeated images of Skeezix and his pal Whimpy as they play around the foundations dug out of their favorite baseball diamond and meet a local girl. Here the threesome move around 12 identical square panels and time unfolds in sequence, although jumping ahead sometimes by a considerable period from one to the next.

The success of Gasoline Alley escalated until it was published in over 300 daily newspapers with a daily combined readership of over 27,000,000. According to Lew Merrell, the strip and its merchandising made King a millionaire.

Frank King's Gasoline Alley (December 6, 1936)

In 1929, the Kings moved to Florida. For 20 years, they lived between Kissimmee, Florida, and St. Cloud at his Folly Farms estate on the northeast shore of Lake Tohopekaliga. The cartoonist's estate of 230 acres (0.93 km^{2}) along the Lake is still there, hidden among the other houses in the Regal Oak Shores subdivision.

In 1941, King wrote, "Just what the future holds for Skeezix and Gasoline Alley nobody knows. If permitted a fanciful prophecy, I should say that Skeezix will eventually marry, probably raise a family and make Uncle Walt a happy foster grandparent. Skeezix's offspring will in turn grow up, marry and have children. They in turn will thrive and mature and repeat the customary cycle ad infinitum."

At Folly Farms, during the 1940s, King spent time on his hobbies—sculpting, collecting maps, playing the fiddle and raising amaryllis bulbs. He retired from the Sunday strip in 1951, letting his assistant Bill Perry to take over. King retired from the daily in 1959, turning it over to Dick Moores, his assistant since 1956. The strip continues until the present day.

In later years, King lived in Winter Park, Florida. On June 24, 1969, Dennis Green, a King employee for many years, arrived to prepare King's breakfast. He heard King moving around the house and later found his body on a bathroom floor. King was buried in Tomah's Oak Grove Cemetery beside his wife, Delia, who died February 7, 1959. The couple's son, Robert King, lived in Des Plaines, Illinois.

== Awards and exhibitions ==
King had one-man shows in Springfield, Illinois, and Buffalo, New York, and his artwork is in the permanent collection of the Billy Ireland Cartoon Library & Museum. In 1955, he was an honored guest at Tomah's Centennial celebration and presented with an Indian headdress. His desk is on display at the Tomah Area Historical Society Museum, and in 1969, Gasoline Alley signs were placed along Superior Avenue in Tomah.

King's Highway in Florida is named to honor Frank King; it runs south from Neptune Road to King's Folly Farms estate. Mr. Enray, the banker in Gasoline Alley during the late 1940s, was based on Kissimmee's real-life banker N. Ray Carroll. When Carroll was a state senator, he had the road named after King by a resolution of the Florida Legislature.

He was twice honored for his work by the Freedom Foundation, and he received awards three times from the National Cartoonists Society.

- 1949: Silver T-Square Award
- 1957: Humor Comic Strip Award
- 1958: Reuben Award
